= List of U.S. states by intentional homicide rate =

Homicide rate by state. CDC.

Homicide rate by state. FBI. 2022 data.

Since 1900, US homicide rates have varied by a factor of more than 2.

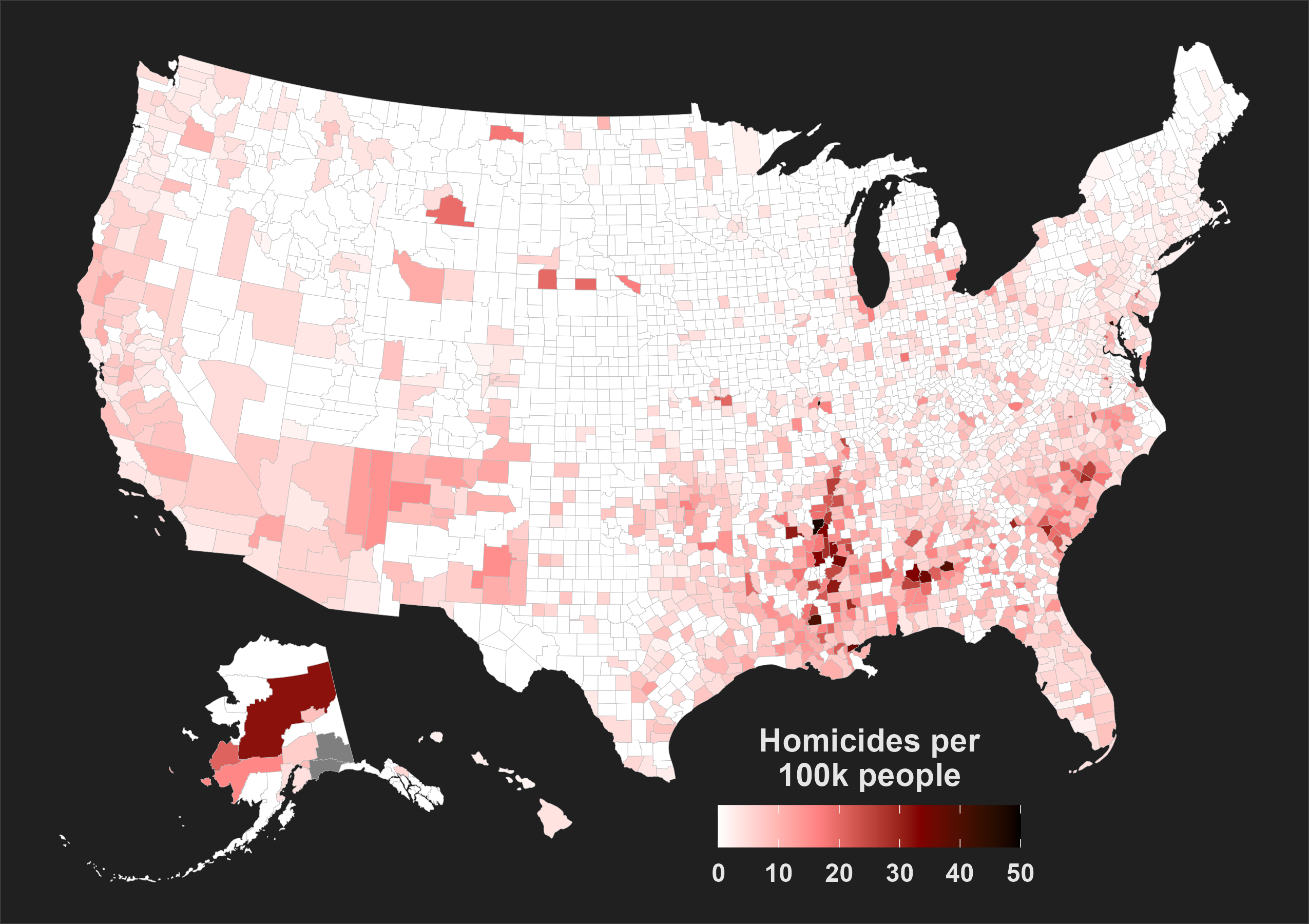
Homicide rate by county. CDC. 2014 to 2020 data.

This is a list of U.S. states by intentional homicide rate. US territories can be found at List of countries by intentional homicide rate. The homicide rate is typically expressed in units of deaths per 100,000 individuals per year; a homicide rate of 4 in a population of 100,000 would mean 4 murders a year, or 0.004% out of the total. The data is from the Centers for Disease Control (CDC), and the Federal Bureau of Investigation (FBI).

The CDC reports a slightly higher rate, as it reports all homicides, and does not indicate whether it was justified or self-defense. From the Reason Foundation: "While the FBI data relies on reports by law enforcement agencies, the CDC data is derived from coroners' reports, encompassing non-criminal homicides such as cases of self-defense. Consequently, the CDC mortality data shows a slightly higher number of homicides annually compared to the FBI data." The agency quotes below make more sense in light of this.

FBI: "The FBI’s Uniform Crime Reporting (UCR) Program defines murder and non-negligent manslaughter as the willful (nonnegligent) killing of one human being by another. The classification of this offense is based solely on police investigation as opposed to the determination of a court, medical examiner, coroner, jury, or other judicial body. The UCR Program does not include the following situations in this offense classification: deaths caused by negligence, suicide, or accident; justifiable homicides; and attempts to murder or assaults to murder, which are classified as aggravated assaults."

CDC: "Homicide – injuries inflicted by another person with intent to injure or kill, by any means. Excludes injuries due to legal intervention and operations of war. Justifiable homicide is not identified in WISQARS." WISQARS is short for Web-based Injury Statistics Query and Reporting System.

== Definitions ==
In the United States, the law for murder varies by jurisdiction. In many US jurisdictions there is a hierarchy of acts, known collectively as homicide. Of which first-degree murder and felony murder are the most serious, followed by second-degree murder and, in a few states, third-degree murder. In some states they are divided into voluntary manslaughter, and involuntary manslaughter; such as reckless homicide and negligent homicide, which are the least serious. There is also justifiable homicide, which is not a crime. However, because there are at least 52 relevant jurisdictions, each with its own criminal code, this is a considerable simplification.

Sentencing varies widely depending upon the specific murder charge. "Life imprisonment" is a common penalty for first-degree murder, but its meaning varies widely. Capital punishment is a legal sentence in 27 states, and in the federal civilian and military legal systems, though eight of these states have indefinitely suspended the practice. The United States is unusual in actually performing executions, with 34 states having performed executions since capital punishment was reinstated in 1976. The methods of execution have varied, but the most common method since 1976 has been lethal injection. In 2019 a total of 22 people were executed, and 2,652 people were on death row. The federal Unborn Victims of Violence Act, enacted in 2004 and codified at 18 U.S. Code § 1841, allows for a fetus to be treated as a victim in a crime. Subsection (c) of that statute specifically prohibits prosecutions related to consented abortions and medical treatments.

== Homicide rates by year: FBI data ==
Note: The location links in this table, as in all the tables below, are "Crime in LOCATION" links, except for Maine.

The following list shows homicide rates for the most recent five years. Data are from the FBI.

Homicides per 100,000 people by year. FBI
Location	2018	2019	2020	2021	2022	2023	2024
United States	5.0	5.1	6.5	6.8	6.3	5.9	5.0
District of Columbia	22.8	23.4	28.2	41.0	29.3	38.7	25.5
Louisiana	11.4	11.7	15.8	19.6	16.1	14.6	10.8
New Mexico	7.3	8.8	7.8	12.9	12.0	11.8	10.5
Alabama	7.8	7.9	9.6	9.4	10.9	10.5	8.7
Tennessee	7.5	7.5	9.6	10.2	8.6	10.0	7.9
Missouri	9.8	9.4	11.8	10.2	10.1	9.4	7.8
South Carolina	8.1	8.8	10.5	11.4	11.2	8.9	7.5
North Carolina	5.5	6.2	8.0	9.4	8.1	8.0	7.5
Mississippi	7.2	10.0	10.6	9.3	7.8	7.2	7.4
Arkansas	7.4	7.8	10.6	11.0	10.2	9.6	7.3
Maryland	8.1	9.0	9.1	11.0	8.5	8.7	7.2
Alaska	6.4	9.4	6.7	6.1	9.5	8.0	6.9
Georgia	6.2	5.7	8.8	7.9	8.2	7.5	6.9
Oklahoma	5.5	6.9	7.4	7.6	6.7	6.3	6.3
Nevada	6.7	4.7	5.7	7.6	6.8	7.3	6.1
Kentucky	5.6	5.1	7.2	8.3	6.8	6.4	6.1
Illinois	7.1	6.7	9.1	9.1	7.8	6.6	5.8
Delaware	4.8	4.8	7.4	9.7	4.8	4.4	5.7
Indiana	6.2	5.5	7.5	7.2	6.2	5.7	5.5
West Virginia	4.2	5.6	6.6	6.0	4.6	6.0	5.3
Texas	4.6	4.9	6.6	7.1	6.7	6.1	5.2
Michigan	5.6	5.8	7.6	7.6	6.9	5.9	5.2
Pennsylvania	6.1	5.3	7.9	8.4	7.9	6.7	5.0
Ohio	5.1	5.0	7.0	7.5	6.1	6.0	5.0
Arizona	5.4	5.4	6.9	6.7	6.8	6.5	4.9
Virginia	4.9	5.2	6.1	6.6	7.3	6.2	4.8
South Dakota	1.4	1.8	4.5	3.0	4.3	2.8	4.7
Colorado	3.8	4.0	5.1	6.2	6.4	5.4	4.5
California	4.4	4.3	5.6	6.0	5.7	5.0	4.5
Wisconsin	3.0	3.2	5.3	5.6	5.3	5.0	4.2
Florida	5.2	5.2	5.9	4.3	5.0	4.8	3.9
Kansas	4.2	3.3	3.4	4.8	4.6	5.3	3.8
Washington	3.1	2.7	3.9	4.3	5.0	4.8	3.8
Oregon	2.1	2.8	2.9	4.8	4.5	4.5	3.7
Vermont	1.8	1.8	2.2	1.4	3.4	2.6	3.4
Minnesota	1.9	2.3	3.4	3.6	3.2	3.2	2.9
New York	2.9	2.9	4.2	4.4	4.0	3.3	2.7
Montana	3.5	3.0	5.0	3.3	4.5	3.2	2.7
North Dakota	2.4	3.3	4.2	1.8	3.5	3.5	2.6
Utah	2.0	2.4	3.1	2.8	2.0	2.3	2.6
Connecticut	2.4	3.0	3.9	4.3	3.8	3.8	2.4
Wyoming	2.4	2.2	3.1	3.1	2.6	3.2	2.4
Maine	1.7	1.6	1.6	1.5	2.2	4.3	2.3
New Jersey	3.2	3.0	3.7	4.1	3.1	2.9	2.3
Nebraska	2.3	2.3	3.6	2.9	3.2	3.5	2.1
Rhode Island	1.5	2.5	3.0	3.4	1.5	2.6	2.1
Iowa	2.2	2.2	3.5	2.3	1.7	2.5	2.1
Massachusetts	2.0	2.2	2.3	1.9	2.1	2.1	1.8
Idaho	1.9	1.6	2.2	2.3	2.7	2.5	1.6
Hawaii	2.8	2.6	2.9	1.6	2.1	2.5	1.6
New Hampshire	1.6	2.4	0.9	0.9	1.8	1.8	1.0

== Homicide rates by year: CDC data ==
The CDC now has data for later years. The 2024 homicide rate for the US as a whole is 5.9 per 100,000 according to CDC FastStats.

Homicides per 100,000 people by year. CDC.
State	2017	2018	2019	2020	2021
Alabama	12.9	12.2	12.8	14.2	15.9
Alaska	10.6	7.5	10.8	7.3	6.4
Arizona	6.6	6.1	5.9	7.5	8.1
Arkansas	9.8	9.1	9.4	13	11.7
California	5.1	4.8	4.5	6.1	6.4
Colorado	4.6	4.7	4.3	5.8	6.3
Connecticut	3.2	2.8	3.1	4.6	4.8
Delaware	6.9	6.8	6.1	9.9	11.3
Florida	6.4	6.6	6.7	7.8	7.4
Georgia	7.9	7.7	8.1	10.5	11.4
Hawaii	2.5	3.1	2.5	3.3	2.7
Idaho	3	2.3	1.7	2.5	2.2
Illinois	9	8	8.1	11.2	12.3
Indiana	7.2	7.4	7.2	9.7	9.6
Iowa	3.4	2.7	2.7	3.6	3.2
Kansas	6.5	5.9	4.9	7	6.4
Kentucky	7.3	6.1	5.9	9.5	9.6
Louisiana	14.4	13.3	14.7	19.9	21.3
Maine	N/A	N/A	1.8	1.6	1.7
Maryland	10.2	9.3	10	11.4	12.2
Massachusetts	2.6	2.3	2.3	2.7	2.3
Michigan	6.3	6.5	6.5	8.7	8.7
Minnesota	2.2	2.3	2.8	3.6	4.3
Mississippi	12.7	13.4	15.4	20.5	23.7
Missouri	11.3	11.4	10.8	14	12.4
Montana	4.3	4.2	3.7	6.6	4.4
Nebraska	2.7	1.9	3.1	4.1	3.6
Nevada	7.6	7.7	5.5	7.3	8.5
New Hampshire	N/A	1.8	2.8	N/A	N/A
New Jersey	4.1	3.7	3.4	4.3	4.8
New Mexico	8.5	10.8	11.8	10.8	15.3
New York	3	3.2	3.2	4.7	4.8
North Carolina	6.9	6.4	7	8.6	9.7
North Dakota	N/A	2.5	3.1	4.4	3.4
Ohio	7.5	6.8	6.6	9.1	9.3
Oklahoma	8.5	7	8.8	9	8.9
Oregon	3.1	2.5	3	3.8	4.9
Pennsylvania	6.6	6.4	6.1	8.5	9.2
Rhode Island	N/A	N/A	2.5	3	3.6
South Carolina	9.3	10.2	11	12.7	13.4
South Dakota	4.2	3.9	3.6	6.5	5.3
Tennessee	8.8	9.2	9.2	11.5	12.2
Texas	5.8	5.4	5.9	7.6	8.2
Utah	2.6	2.2	2.6	2.9	2.7
Vermont	N/A	N/A	N/A	N/A	N/A
Virginia	5.4	5.1	5.3	6.4	7.2
Washington	3.6	3.7	3.2	4.2	4.5
Washington, D.C.					30.0
West Virginia	6.5	5.8	5.7	7	6.9
Wisconsin	3.7	3.9	4.2	6.1	6.4
Wyoming	N/A	4.1	4.4	4.9	N/A

== Homicide rates by type: CDC data ==
The following list shows homicide rates by mechanism, for types where total deaths exceeded 100. Data are from the CDC and average the years 2018 to 2021. Blank values indicate that the underlying homicide count was between 1 and 9, and was suppressed. Excludes unspecified or unclassified data types, but the "Total" includes all deaths including suppressed, unspecified and/or unclassified data.

Homicide per 100,000 people by mechanism. CDC. Average of 2018 to 2021
Location	Total	Gun	Stab	Choke	Struck	Poison	Fire
United States	6.7	5.2	0.6	0.1	0.1	0.1	0.0
District of Columbia	25.7	20.4	2.5				0.0
Mississippi	17.2	14.9	1.0	0.2	0.1		0.1
Louisiana	16.5	13.9	0.9	0.2	0.2	0.1	0.1
Alabama	12.9	11.0	0.7	0.2	0.1		
New Mexico	11.5	8.0	1.4	0.2			
Missouri	11.4	9.7	0.6	0.1	0.1	0.2	
South Carolina	11.1	9.3	0.6	0.2	0.1	0.1	
Arkansas	10.3	8.0	0.9	0.2	0.2		
Maryland	10.2	8.3	0.6	0.1		0.1	
Tennessee	10.1	8.5	0.6	0.2			0.0
Illinois	9.5	8.0	0.5	0.2	0.0	0.1	0.0
Georgia	9.2	7.6	0.5	0.2	0.1	0.0	
Alaska	8.1	5.0	1.1	0.5	0.5	0.0	
Indiana	8.1	6.4	0.6	0.2	0.1	0.0	0.1
Oklahoma	8.1	6.0	0.7	0.2			
North Carolina	7.7	6.2	0.5	0.1	0.1		
Delaware	7.6	6.3	0.5				
Ohio	7.5	6.0	0.5	0.1	0.1	0.1	0.0
Kentucky	7.4	6.2	0.5	0.2	0.1		0.1
Michigan	7.1	5.8	0.5	0.1	0.0		0.1
Nevada	7.0	5.0	0.6	0.2	0.1		
Pennsylvania	7.0	5.4	0.5	0.1	0.1	0.4	0.0
Texas	6.7	5.2	0.5	0.1	0.1	0.0	0.0
Arizona	6.6	4.8	0.7	0.2	0.1		
Florida	6.5	5.1	0.5	0.2	0.1	0.0	0.0
Virginia	5.8	4.7	0.5	0.1	0.1		0.0
West Virginia	5.8	4.4	0.4				
Kansas	5.8	4.5	0.4				0.0
California	5.4	3.9	0.7	0.1	0.1	0.0	0.0
Colorado	5.3	3.7	0.6	0.2	0.1	0.0	
Wisconsin	4.8	3.6	0.4	0.1	0.1	0.0	
Montana	4.4	2.5	0.5	0.3			
South Dakota	4.4	2.2	0.9		0.3		
Washington	3.9	2.6	0.5	0.1	0.1		
New York	3.8	2.4	0.7	0.1	0.1	0.0	0.0
New Jersey	3.8	2.6	0.5	0.1	0.0	0.0	0.1
Wyoming	3.8	2.5				0.0	0.0
Connecticut	3.6	2.3	0.5	0.1	0.1		
Oregon	3.5	2.4	0.4	0.1	0.1	0.0	
Minnesota	3.1	2.1	0.3	0.1	0.0		
North Dakota	3.1	2.0	0.4			0.0	
Nebraska	3.1	2.1	0.3	0.1			0.0
Iowa	2.8	1.8	0.2	0.1			
Hawaii	2.8	1.3	0.5				
Utah	2.6	1.8	0.2		0.1		
Rhode Island	2.5	1.7	0.4				0.0
Massachusetts	2.4	1.5	0.4	0.1			
Idaho	2.1	1.4	0.2		0.1		
Vermont	1.9	1.2					0.0
New Hampshire	1.6	0.9					0.0
Maine	1.5	0.9					

== Homicide rates by decade: FBI data ==
The following list shows homicide rates by decade, averaging the rates for each year. Data are from the FBI. Data for the 2020s are for 2020 to 2022.

Homicides per 100,000 people by decade. FBI
Location	1980s	1990s	2000s	2010s	2020s
United States	8.7	8.1	5.6	4.9	6.6
District of Columbia	37.7	67.3	35.8	19.2	32.8
Louisiana	13.6	16.5	12.4	11.1	17.2
South Carolina	9.7	9.3	7.4	7.3	11.0
New Mexico	10.7	9.6	7.8	6.6	10.9
Missouri	8.8	9.0	6.4	7.8	10.7
Arkansas	8.2	9.7	6.3	6.4	10.6
Alabama	10.4	10.5	7.5	7.2	10.0
Maryland	9.4	11.2	9.1	7.7	9.6
Tennessee	9.4	9.7	6.9	6.5	9.5
Mississippi	11.2	12.2	8.2	7.8	9.2
Illinois	9.1	10.2	6.6	6.4	8.7
North Carolina	8.7	9.6	6.3	5.4	8.5
Georgia	11.9	9.8	6.9	6.0	8.3
Pennsylvania	5.5	6.0	5.5	5.3	8.0
Alaska	10.9	7.8	5.1	6.2	7.5
Kentucky	7.8	6.3	4.6	4.8	7.4
Michigan	10.5	8.9	6.4	6.0	7.4
Delaware	5.2	4.1	4.0	5.4	7.3
Oklahoma	8.2	7.6	5.6	5.7	7.3
Indiana	6.3	7.4	5.6	5.4	7.0
Ohio	6.0	5.4	4.5	4.8	6.9
Texas	13.9	10.1	6.0	4.7	6.8
Arizona	8.1	8.6	7.4	5.5	6.8
Nevada	12.5	10.9	7.7	6.1	6.7
Virginia	7.7	7.8	5.3	4.7	6.7
Colorado	6.2	5.1	3.6	3.3	5.9
California	11.3	10.3	6.4	4.7	5.8
West Virginia	5.4	5.2	3.7	4.4	5.7
Wisconsin	3.1	4.2	3.1	3.1	5.4
Florida	12.3	8.0	5.7	5.2	5.1
Washington	5.0	4.6	3.0	2.7	4.4
Kansas	5.1	6.0	4.2	3.8	4.3
Montana	3.8	3.4	3.0	3.2	4.2
New York	11.4	9.8	4.6	3.3	4.2
Oregon	5.0	4.0	2.2	2.4	4.1
Connecticut	4.8	4.9	3.1	2.9	4.0
South Dakota	2.1	1.7	2.5	2.6	3.9
New Jersey	5.7	4.7	4.3	3.9	3.6
Minnesota	2.3	3.1	2.3	1.9	3.4
Nebraska	3.1	3.3	3.0	2.8	3.2
North Dakota	1.3	1.2	1.6	2.6	3.1
Wyoming	4.9	3.5	2.6	2.6	2.9
Utah	3.2	3.0	2.1	2.1	2.6
Rhode Island	3.8	3.5	3.0	2.4	2.6
Iowa	2.1	1.8	1.6	2.0	2.5
Idaho	3.2	3.0	2.1	2.0	2.4
Vermont	2.7	2.2	1.9	1.7	2.3
Hawaii	4.8	3.7	2.1	2.0	2.2
Massachusetts	3.6	3.1	2.6	2.3	2.1
Maine	2.5	1.9	1.5	1.7	1.7
New Hampshire	2.4	1.9	1.2	1.4	1.2

== Homicide totals by year: FBI data ==
The following list shows homicide totals for the most recent five years. Data are from the FBI.

Homicides by year. FBI
Location	2018	2019	2020	2021	2022
United States	16,374	16,669	21,570	22,536	21,156
California	1,739	1,690	2,203	2,346	2,231
Texas	1,327	1,432	1,931	2,087	2,026
Florida	1,107	1,122	1,290	937	1,113
Pennsylvania	784	676	1,009	1,087	1,020
Illinois	902	851	1,151	1,150	982
Georgia	647	605	943	851	893
North Carolina	574	653	852	995	862
New York	562	565	808	871	783
Louisiana	533	547	734	907	740
Ohio	596	584	820	883	718
Michigan	555	576	754	761	695
Virginia	417	447	524	573	638
Missouri	599	576	723	630	624
Tennessee	508	515	663	709	609
South Carolina	411	455	549	590	592
Alabama	383	390	471	476	552
Maryland	491	545	553	680	526
Arizona	383	397	513	485	500
Indiana	418	373	505	490	427
Washington	236	205	301	331	387
Colorado	215	229	294	360	375
Wisconsin	175	189	308	332	314
Arkansas	222	237	321	334	312
Kentucky	250	229	323	374	306
New Jersey	285	263	329	381	286
Oklahoma	215	275	296	304	270
New Mexico	153	185	164	273	253
Mississippi	214	298	315	274	228
Nevada	202	144	180	239	216
District of Columbia	160	166	201	274	197
Oregon	86	117	125	204	192
Minnesota	107	127	190	203	182
Massachusetts	138	153	160	134	148
Connecticut	86	107	140	155	136
Kansas	122	95	100	142	134
West Virginia	76	100	117	108	81
Alaska	47	69	49	45	70
Utah	63	77	102	94	67
Nebraska	44	45	69	57	62
Iowa	70	70	111	73	53
Idaho	34	28	41	43	53
Montana	37	32	54	36	50
Delaware	46	47	73	97	49
South Dakota	12	16	40	27	39
Hawaii	40	37	41	23	30
Maine	23	22	22	20	30
North Dakota	18	25	32	14	27
New Hampshire	21	33	12	13	25
Vermont	11	11	14	9	22
Rhode Island	16	26	32	37	16
Wyoming	14	13	18	18	15

== See also ==
- Crime in the United States
  - List of U.S. states and territories by violent crime rate
  - List of United States cities by crime rate
  - United States cities by crime rate (100,000–250,000)
  - United States cities by crime rate (60,000-100,000)
- Firearm death rates in the United States by state
- Gun violence in the United States by state
- List of countries by intentional homicide rate
- List of cities by murder rate
- List of federal subjects of Russia by murder rate
- List of Brazilian states by murder rate
- List of Mexican states by homicides
- Homicide in world cities
