= List of U.S. states and territories by violent crime rate =

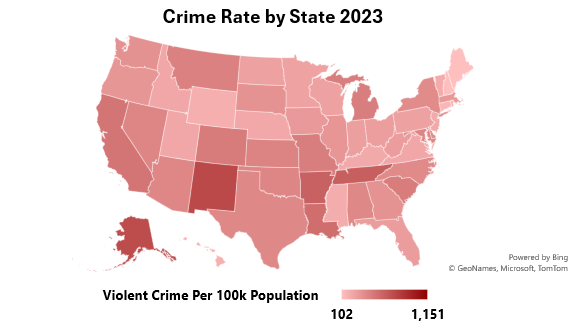
Violent crime rate per 100k population by state (2023)

This is a list of U.S. states and territories by violent crime rate. It is typically expressed in units of incidents per 100,000 individuals per year; thus, a violent crime rate of 300 (per 100,000 inhabitants) in a population of 100,000 would mean 300 incidents of violent crime per year in that entire population, or 0.3% out of the total. These data have been taken from the FBI's Uniform Crime Reports.

In the United States, violent crime consists of five types of criminal offenses: murder and non-negligent manslaughter, rape, robbery, aggravated assault, and gang violence.

== Rate by crime ==
Data in this table are from the FBI and for the year 2024.

| Location | Violent crime | Homicide | Rape | Robbery | Aggravated assault |
|---|---|---|---|---|---|
| United States | 359.1 | 5.0 | 37.5 | 60.6 | 256.1 |
| District of Columbia | 1,005.5 | 25.5 | 34.6 | 481.5 | 463.9 |
| Alaska | 724.1 | 6.9 | 122.1 | 82.0 | 513.0 |
| New Mexico | 717.1 | 10.5 | 53.8 | 65.3 | 587.5 |
| Tennessee | 592.3 | 7.9 | 37.4 | 58.4 | 488.6 |
| Arkansas | 579.4 | 7.3 | 70.0 | 38.6 | 463.5 |
| Louisiana | 519.8 | 10.8 | 33.7 | 39.4 | 436.0 |
| California | 486.0 | 4.5 | 36.6 | 119.1 | 325.8 |
| Colorado | 476.3 | 4.5 | 58.3 | 63.0 | 350.5 |
| Missouri | 462.0 | 7.8 | 45.2 | 51.5 | 357.5 |
| Kansas | 438.7 | 3.8 | 44.1 | 30.9 | 359.9 |
| South Carolina | 436.7 | 7.5 | 37.1 | 35.1 | 357.1 |
| Michigan | 434.3 | 5.2 | 56.5 | 31.3 | 341.3 |
| Montana | 423.5 | 2.7 | 59.2 | 19.1 | 342.5 |
| Oklahoma | 422.8 | 6.3 | 59.7 | 38.2 | 318.7 |
| Arizona | 421.9 | 4.9 | 40.0 | 64.6 | 312.4 |
| Maryland | 420.4 | 7.2 | 33.0 | 123.2 | 257.0 |
| Nevada | 402.0 | 6.1 | 51.8 | 63.1 | 281.0 |
| Texas | 389.4 | 5.2 | 50.0 | 63.5 | 270.7 |
| New York | 380.2 | 2.7 | 21.7 | 96.1 | 259.6 |
| North Carolina | 375.8 | 7.5 | 28.0 | 50.2 | 290.1 |
| South Dakota | 362.3 | 4.7 | 51.5 | 22.6 | 283.6 |
| Delaware | 360.8 | 5.7 | 15.7 | 47.0 | 292.4 |
| Alabama | 359.9 | 8.7 | 25.8 | 34.0 | 291.4 |
| Oregon | 331.0 | 3.7 | 41.2 | 57.0 | 229.1 |
| Washington | 326.1 | 3.8 | 37.8 | 67.5 | 217.0 |
| Georgia | 325.7 | 6.9 | 32.2 | 40.8 | 245.9 |
| Massachusetts | 314.7 | 1.8 | 27.6 | 36.0 | 249.3 |
| Indiana | 312.9 | 5.5 | 33.5 | 34.5 | 239.4 |
| Ohio | 293.7 | 5.0 | 45.7 | 45.5 | 197.4 |
| Illinois | 289.2 | 5.8 | 46.9 | 90.2 | 146.3 |
| Wisconsin | 278.5 | 4.2 | 34.8 | 39.4 | 200.1 |
| Florida | 267.1 | 3.9 | 27.9 | 38.2 | 197.1 |
| Minnesota | 256.6 | 2.9 | 36.8 | 48.9 | 168.0 |
| North Dakota | 254.3 | 2.6 | 49.8 | 27.4 | 174.5 |
| West Virginia | 248.8 | 5.3 | 48.0 | 9.7 | 185.8 |
| Pennsylvania | 245.6 | 5.0 | 27.8 | 51.4 | 161.4 |
| Iowa | 243.3 | 2.1 | 35.2 | 18.7 | 187.2 |
| Idaho | 230.6 | 1.6 | 44.7 | 7.0 | 177.3 |
| Utah | 229.6 | 2.6 | 58.0 | 27.3 | 141.7 |
| Nebraska | 220.5 | 2.1 | 43.5 | 20.5 | 154.5 |
| Vermont | 219.1 | 3.4 | 34.7 | 14.2 | 166.8 |
| Virginia | 217.9 | 4.8 | 27.8 | 33.1 | 152.2 |
| New Jersey | 217.7 | 2.3 | 17.3 | 49.3 | 148.8 |
| Hawaii | 217.7 | 1.6 | 38.9 | 41.3 | 136.0 |
| Kentucky | 213.1 | 6.1 | 32.4 | 35.1 | 139.5 |
| Mississippi | 210.5 | 7.4 | 29.3 | 18.5 | 155.4 |
| Wyoming | 203.4 | 2.4 | 58.0 | 7.1 | 135.8 |
| Rhode Island | 153.6 | 2.1 | 29.5 | 22.2 | 99.8 |
| Connecticut | 136.0 | 2.5 | 17.9 | 38.1 | 77.6 |
| New Hampshire | 110.1 | 1.0 | 33.7 | 12.6 | 62.8 |
| Maine | 100.1 | 2.3 | 31.7 | 11.0 | 55.0 |

== Rate by year ==
Data in this table are from the FBI.

| Location | 2018 | 2019 | 2020 | 2021 | 2022 | 2023 | 2024 |
|---|---|---|---|---|---|---|---|
| United States | 383.4 | 380.8 | 398.5 | 387.0 | 380.7 | 379.5 | 359.1 |
| District of Columbia | 997.1 | 1,045.2 | 999.8 | 951.3 | 812.3 | 1,141.5 | 1,005.5 |
| Alaska | 891.7 | 865.0 | 837.8 | 759.1 | 758.9 | 733.6 | 724.1 |
| New Mexico | 842.8 | 824.0 | 778.3 | 820.8 | 780.5 | 746.9 | 717.1 |
| Tennessee | 630.4 | 598.9 | 672.7 | 671.8 | 621.6 | 636.5 | 592.3 |
| Arkansas | 561.6 | 580.8 | 671.9 | 702.4 | 645.3 | 623.3 | 579.4 |
| Louisiana | 543.3 | 559.7 | 639.4 | 662.7 | 628.6 | 562.1 | 519.8 |
| California | 447.5 | 442.1 | 442.0 | 481.2 | 499.5 | 506.9 | 486.0 |
| Colorado | 401.5 | 384.6 | 423.1 | 480.4 | 492.5 | 485.2 | 476.3 |
| Missouri | 501.4 | 499.6 | 542.7 | 524.3 | 488.0 | 471.0 | 462.0 |
| Kansas | 441.8 | 405.5 | 425.0 | 444.9 | 414.6 | 468.6 | 438.7 |
| South Carolina | 500.8 | 510.1 | 530.7 | 513.8 | 491.3 | 477.1 | 436.7 |
| Michigan | 452.5 | 438.6 | 478.0 | 491.1 | 461.0 | 460.8 | 434.3 |
| Montana | 380.9 | 417.9 | 469.8 | 469.8 | 417.9 | 448.7 | 423.5 |
| Oklahoma | 474.6 | 436.3 | 458.6 | 438.0 | 419.7 | 418.2 | 422.8 |
| Arizona | 475.7 | 447.1 | 484.8 | 425.6 | 431.5 | 433.8 | 421.9 |
| Maryland | 469.4 | 454.4 | 399.9 | 435.1 | 398.5 | 440.3 | 420.4 |
| Nevada | 552.1 | 496.1 | 460.3 | 432.0 | 454.0 | 433.7 | 402.0 |
| Texas | 412.9 | 421.8 | 446.5 | 453.0 | 431.9 | 407.3 | 389.4 |
| New York | 350.8 | 361.0 | 363.8 | 308.3 | 429.3 | 391.1 | 380.2 |
| North Carolina | 356.2 | 378.7 | 419.3 | 419.5 | 405.1 | 393.5 | 375.8 |
| South Dakota | 396.4 | 397.1 | 501.4 | 391.8 | 377.4 | 352.2 | 362.3 |
| Delaware | 422.5 | 422.7 | 431.9 | 419.2 | 383.5 | 394.0 | 360.8 |
| Alabama | 523.1 | 504.7 | 453.6 | 348.3 | 409.1 | 417.2 | 359.9 |
| Oregon | 290.4 | 293.7 | 291.9 | 341.3 | 342.4 | 332.0 | 331.0 |
| Washington | 315.3 | 303.3 | 293.7 | 335.7 | 375.6 | 359.3 | 326.1 |
| Georgia | 338.9 | 326.2 | 400.1 | 349.8 | 367.0 | 367.0 | 325.7 |
| Massachusetts | 340.3 | 328.7 | 308.8 | 301.1 | 322.0 | 320.9 | 314.7 |
| Indiana | 373.5 | 371.5 | 357.7 | 332.6 | 306.2 | 341.8 | 312.9 |
| Ohio | 294.8 | 296.0 | 308.8 | 317.4 | 293.6 | 301.3 | 293.7 |
| Illinois | 411.4 | 415.3 | 425.9 | 344.8 | 287.3 | 308.7 | 289.2 |
| Wisconsin | 299.0 | 297.1 | 323.4 | 325.4 | 297.0 | 298.0 | 278.5 |
| Florida | 385.9 | 378.2 | 383.6 | 337.3 | 258.9 | 292.7 | 267.1 |
| Minnesota | 221.2 | 237.5 | 277.5 | 308.9 | 280.6 | 262.9 | 256.6 |
| North Dakota | 284.1 | 301.4 | 329.0 | 276.4 | 279.6 | 279.8 | 254.3 |
| West Virginia | 299.9 | 318.9 | 355.9 | 291.5 | 277.9 | 268.9 | 248.8 |
| Pennsylvania | 305.4 | 306.0 | 389.5 | 281.8 | 279.9 | 267.9 | 245.6 |
| Iowa | 263.7 | 287.6 | 303.5 | 295.0 | 286.5 | 273.6 | 243.3 |
| Idaho | 239.7 | 232.6 | 242.6 | 240.8 | 241.4 | 240.4 | 230.6 |
| Utah | 239.4 | 236.9 | 260.7 | 259.1 | 241.8 | 231.4 | 229.6 |
| Nebraska | 289.9 | 304.6 | 334.1 | 297.0 | 282.8 | 232.7 | 220.5 |
| Vermont | 185.0 | 207.2 | 173.4 | 194.0 | 221.9 | 216.0 | 219.1 |
| Virginia | 204.2 | 209.4 | 208.7 | 225.5 | 234.0 | 241.6 | 217.9 |
| New Jersey | 208.6 | 206.7 | 195.4 | 183.5 | 202.9 | 225.3 | 217.7 |
| Hawaii | 255.0 | 264.5 | 254.2 | 274.0 | 259.6 | 232.1 | 217.7 |
| Kentucky | 217.9 | 220.7 | 259.1 | 269.0 | 214.1 | 229.2 | 213.1 |
| Mississippi | 266.0 | 261.2 | 291.2 | 255.4 | 245.0 | 201.9 | 210.5 |
| Wyoming | 213.8 | 215.0 | 234.2 | 223.8 | 201.9 | 193.7 | 203.4 |
| Rhode Island | 219.8 | 222.7 | 230.8 | 200.5 | 172.3 | 167.5 | 153.6 |
| Connecticut | 209.6 | 184.6 | 181.6 | 168.6 | 150.0 | 152.4 | 136.0 |
| New Hampshire | 177.6 | 158.1 | 146.4 | 129.7 | 125.6 | 115.0 | 110.1 |
| Maine | 112.0 | 116.1 | 108.6 | 112.9 | 103.3 | 103.8 | 100.1 |

== See also ==
- Crime in the United States
  - List of U.S. states and territories by intentional homicide rate
  - List of United States cities by crime rate
  - United States cities by crime rate (100,000–250,000)
  - United States cities by crime rate (60,000-100,000)
  - Gun violence in the United States by state
- List of countries by intentional homicide rate
- List of cities by murder rate (List of United States cities by crime rate)
- Homicide in world cities
- Crime in Canada
- List of Mexican states by homicides
