= Bowel Movement Bandit =

American criminal

- Other names: Kenmore pooper, Ohio Pooping Bandit
- Years active: 2012–2015
- Known for: Repeatedly defecating in cars
- Criminal charge: Criminal Mischief
- Capture status: Unidentified
- Wanted since: 2012

Details
- Country: United States
- State: Ohio

The Bowel Movement Bandit (also known as the Ohio Pooping Bandit) is the alias of an unidentified man in the Kenmore neighborhood of Akron, Ohio, United States, who repeatedly defecated through the sunroofs of random people’s cars from 2012 to 2015. It has been speculated his name is Richie based on a Hot Topic membership card found at the scene. In total, the criminal defecated on 19 parked cars in driveways. The criminal only stopped his public defecation spree after a photo of his face was captured by a hidden camera and released to the public.

== History ==
Starting in May 2012, residents of the Kenmore neighborhood in Akron, Ohio, found feces on or in their cars. If their cars were locked, the perpetrator would defecate on the hood, windshield, gas tank covering, mirrors, windows, or handles of the car. However, if the cars were unlocked, the perpetrator would defecate on the interior of the car. In total, 19 people reported finding fecal matter on their car, but Lt. Rick Edwards of the Akron Police Department believes there are more victims.

On March 10, 2015, the face of the perpetrator was caught on a hidden camera set up by the father of a woman whose car was targeted by the perpetrator seven times. The hidden camera took a photo every twelve seconds. The photo of the perpetrator was released to the public by the Akron Beacon Journal on March 11, 2015. The perpetrator was estimated to be in his mid-40s when the photo was taken.

=== Partial list of incidents ===
| Date | Car model | Details |
|---|---|---|
| May 15, 2012 | 2000 Toyota Celica | A 27-year-old man told the authorities that someone pooped on his car, stating it was the second time he found excrement on his vehicle. |
| December 5, 2012 | 2002 Mitsubishi Galant | A 32-year-old woman reported to the authorities that someone threw feces on the hood of her car. |
| December 19, 2012 | 2002 Mitsubishi Galant | The same woman mentioned in the December 5 incident reported that someone again put feces on the hood of her car. |
| August 14, 2013 | 2002 Toyota Celica | A 25-year-old woman reported that someone defecated on her car. She said it was the second time she found feces on her vehicle. |
| September 4, 2013 | 2003 Chevrolet Cavalier | A woman, 43, told police that someone defecated on the hood of her car and smeared excrement on the door handles. |
| October 1, 2013 | 2002 Toyota Celica | The same woman from the August 14 incident reported that someone pooped on the hood of her car again. |
| July 15, 2014 | 1991 Chevrolet Camaro | A man, 30, told police that someone defecated on the hood of his car, and smeared excrement on the passenger side mirror. |
| October 15, 2014 | 2002 Chevrolet Cavalier | A man, 19, reported that someone defecated on the hood of his car, and smeared feces across the handles of the vehicle. |
| January 22, 2015 | | A person alerted police that someone pooped on their car. |
| March 10, 2015 | | The perpetrator was caught by a hidden camera defecating on a woman's car. |

== See also ==
- Crime in Ohio
