= Donna Lee Bakery murders =

1974 mass shooting in Connecticut, US

- Location: New Britain, Connecticut, U.S.
- Date: October 19, 1974 (52 years ago)
- Attack type: Mass shooting
- Weapons: 9mm Walther P38 handgun; 16-gauge double-barreled shotgun
- Deaths: 6
- Perpetrators: Ronald F. Piskorski; Gary B. Schrager

The Donna Lee Bakery murders occurred on the night of October 19, 1974, in New Britain, Connecticut, United States. Six people were found murdered inside the bakery. At the time, it was the worst mass murder in Connecticut history. Two local men were convicted of the murders: Ronald F. "Tiny" Piskorski, a 25‐year‐old former bar bouncer and circus‐bear wrestler, and Gary B. Schrager, a 31‐year‐old drifter.

== Murders ==
During the slayings, the bakery owner, a store clerk, three customers, and a young passerby who had stopped in to ask directions were shot in the back of the head after they were forced to lie face down on the floor of a back room at the Donna Lee Bakery.

Authorities had initially suspected robbery as the motive for the killings, and believed that both Piskorski and Schrager took part in the murders. Investigators later theorized that one of the victims had recognized Schrager during the robbery, and the perpetrators thus felt the need to eliminate all witnesses. Michael P. Kron, age 49, one of the victims, was related to Schrager as his uncle by marriage. Schrager felt that Kron had recognized him and would be able to identify him.

== Victims ==
The six victims included:

- John Salerni, age 55 – Salerni owned the business and had named the bakery for his beloved daughter, Donna Lee Salerni (a 19-year-old college freshman at the time of the murders).
- Helen Giansanti, age 59
- William J. Donohue, Jr., age 27
- Thomas Dowling, age 58
- Anne Dowling, age 58
- Michael P. Kron, age 49

Of the six victims found dead at the scene of the crimes, one, John Salerni, had been slain by a shotgun blast; each of the others was killed by a bullet.

== Perpetrators ==
Piskorski was found guilty of the murders at his trial in December 1975. Because capital punishment was not available at that time, he was sentenced to 150 years to life in prison.

Schrager's trial began late in 1976. He halted proceedings early to plead guilty to four of the six slayings. In a strange confession, Schrager admitted that both he and Piskorski had gone to the bakery to rob it. Schrager said he never shot anyone, but he would not name the killer. Schrager stated only that "someone" had gone into the back of the bakery, and he heard several shots. Schrager was sentenced to 20 years to life in prison for being an accessory to murder. He attempted to gain parole several times, despite the strenuous objections of victims' families. The state parole board ruled in 1997 that he will never be set free.

Piskorski died in prison on November 12, 2024, at the age of 75. Schrager died in prison on October 18, 2024, at the age of 81.

== See also ==
- Capital punishment in Connecticut
- Crime in Connecticut
- Lorne J. Acquin (1950–2015), another Connecticut mass murderer
