= Murder of Helle Crafts =

Danish flight attendant murdered by her husband, airline pilot Richard Crafts

Helle Crafts
- Helle Crafts
- Born: Helle Lorck Nielsen; July 7, 1947; Charlottenlund, Denmark
- Died: November 19, 1986 (aged 39); Newtown, Connecticut, U.S.
- Cause of death: Blunt force trauma
- Occupation: Flight attendant
- Known for: Murder victim
- Spouse: Richard Crafts
- Children: 3

Helle Crafts (English: /ˈhɛlə ˈkræfts/; born Helle Lorck Nielsen; July 7, 1947 – November 19, 1986) was a Danish flight attendant who was murdered by her husband, Eastern Air Lines pilot Richard Crafts. Her death led to the state of Connecticut's first murder conviction without the victim's body.

== Disappearance ==
Helle Nielsen married Richard Crafts in 1975 and settled with him in Newtown, Connecticut, United States. Helle continued working as a flight attendant while raising their three children. In 1986, Helle began to suspect that Richard was engaged in extramarital sexual activity, and confronted him about suspicious long-distance phone calls, which angered Richard. Helle met with a divorce attorney and hired a private investigator, Keith Mayo, who snapped photos of Richard kissing another flight attendant outside her New Jersey residence.

On November 18, 1986, friends dropped Helle off at the couple's Newtown residence after she had worked a long flight from Frankfurt, West Germany. She was never seen again. That night, a snowstorm hit the area. The next morning, Richard said he was taking Helle and their children to his sister's house in Westport. When he arrived, Helle was not with him. Over the next few weeks, Richard gave Helle's friends a variety of stories as to why they were unable to reach her: that she was visiting her mother in Denmark, that she was visiting the Canary Islands with a friend, or that he simply did not know her whereabouts. Helle's friends were aware that Richard had a volatile temper and grew concerned. Helle had told some of them, "If something happens to me, don't assume it was an accident." On December 1, the private investigator Keith Mayo reported her missing to the Newtown Police. Richard Crafts was known to local law enforcement for his work as a volunteer police officer in Newtown, and in 1986 Crafts was working as a part-time police officer in the nearby town of Southbury. According to Mayo, Newtown Police initially dismissed his concerns, saying that Helle would probably return.

== Investigation ==
Convinced that Richard Crafts was involved in Helle's disappearance but unable to persuade local police to investigate him for murder, Mayo took his findings to the county prosecutor, who eventually referred the case to the Connecticut State Police. On December 26, while Richard was vacationing with his children in Florida, troopers searched his home. Inside, they found pieces of carpet taken from the master bedroom floor. The family's nanny recalled that a dark, grapefruit-sized stain had appeared in an area of the carpet, which was later missing. There was also a blood smear on the side of the mattress. The forensic investigation was led by Henry Lee, who at the time was an investigator for the state police.

Richard's credit card records showed several unusual purchases around the time Helle vanished, including a freezer that was not found in the house, bed sheets, a comforter, and the rental of a woodchipper. Among papers provided to a private investigator by Richard was a receipt for a chainsaw.

A key piece of evidence was provided by Joseph Hine, a local man who worked for the town of Southbury and drove a town snowplow in the winter. On the night of November 18, hours after Helle had been last seen, Hine was plowing the roads during the snowstorm when he noticed a rental truck, with a woodchipper attached, parked close to the shore of Lake Zoar. It was only after the search of the Crafts' house that Hine reported what he had seen. He led detectives to the location, where they examined the water's edge and found many small pieces of metal and some 3 ounces (85 g) of human tissue, including the crown of a tooth, a fingernail covered in pink nail polish, bone chips, 2,660 bleached blonde human hairs, and O type blood, which was the same type as that of Helle Crafts. This led the police to conclude the remains had likely been fed through the woodchipper Richard had been seen towing. Additionally, a chainsaw that contained traces of blonde human hair was found underwater. Though the serial number marking on the chainsaw was scrubbed away, the investigators restored the number in the laboratory. The serial number on the tool was traced to the retailer, whose records confirmed that Richard Crafts had purchased the chainsaw. Investigators concluded that Richard struck Helle in the head with something blunt at least twice, staining the carpet with blood, then kept her body in the freezer for hours until she was frozen solid. He cut her apart with the chainsaw and then put the pieces through the woodchipper, probably projecting her fragmented remains into the truck and then shoveling them out onto the shore.

A prosecution for homicide requires an official determination of the death of the alleged victim; typically, this is done by identification of a body, which was not available in this case. With the help of a forensic dentist, the tooth crown found on the water's edge was positively matched to Helle's dental records. On this evidence, the Connecticut State Medical Examiner's Office issued a death certificate on January 13, 1987; Richard was immediately arrested. In preparation for trial, state medical examiner H. Wayne Carver obtained a pig carcass fed through a woodchipper. The shape of, and marks on, the pig's bone chips after this process were similar to the shape of Helle's bone fragments, strengthening the hypothesis that Richard had used a woodchipper to dispose of his wife's body.

Richard Crafts' murder trial began in May 1988 in New London, where it was moved due to extensive local publicity. The case went to the jury after 54 days. On July 15, 1988, the 17th day of jury deliberations, a single juror—the only juror in favor of acquittal—refused to continue, and the judge declared a mistrial. A second trial in Norwalk ended in a guilty verdict on November 21, 1989. Richard was sentenced to serve 50 years in prison. On January 30, 2020, Richard was released from prison and sent to live at a halfway house in Bridgeport. Richard was released early because of "statutory good time," which allows sentences to be shortened for good behavior and jailhouse jobs.

== In popular culture ==
The special edition DVD of the 1996 film Fargo contains a statement that the Crafts case inspired the film, particularly the very end of the film where a character, played by Steve Buscemi, is killed and his body is put through a woodchipper.

The opening episode of Forensic Files, "The Disappearance of Helle Crafts", was about Helle Crafts' murder and the forensic investigation.

== See also ==
- Crime in Connecticut
- List of murder convictions without a body
- Uxoricide

== Bibliography ==
- The Woodchipper Murder by Arthur Herzog
