= List of federal subjects of Russia by murder rate =

== List of the federal subjects of Russia by homicide rate (homicides per 100,000) ==
Federal Subject	1990	1995	2000	2005	2006	2007	2008	2009	2010	2011	2012	2013	2014	2015	2016	2017
Russian Federation	14.3	30.8	28.2	24.9	20.02	17.53	16.52	14.9	13.16	11.5	10.4	9.7	8.7	8	7	6
Central Federal District	10.5	25.5	21.7	19.1	15.95	13.88	13.18	11.65	9.87	8.4	7.7	6.9	6.6	6	5.4	4.7
Belgorod Oblast	8.9	14.3	17.8	12	9.49	8.54	8.31	7.95	6.22	6.1	5.9	5.5	4.8	5.4	4.4	3.9
Bryansk Oblast	9.2	14	15	19.6	15.92	15.77	13.65	12.04	11.1	11	10.1	9.1	8.5	7.6	5.5	5.8
Vladimir Oblast	10.6	23.3	26.7	31.8	27.3	22.16	17.45	15.76	12.98	12.4	12	9	10.8	7.6	9.3	9.6
Voronezh Oblast	2.9	5.6	9.3	14.6	9.64	7.4	7	5.53	4.48	3	3.7	5.9	4.9	4.3	3	2.5
Ivanovo Oblast	13.3	28.5	31.4	32.1	21.85	17.36	18.14	18.99	14.03	10.6	10.8	10	6.2	7.3	7.8	7.1
Kaluga Oblast	11.3	19.9	25.3	18.1	12.28	10.64	11.18	11	11.01	10.9	10.9	8.7	7.8	7.6	6.6	5.4
Kostroma Oblast	11.4	23	22.6	18.2	16.43	13.58	13.68	11.44	8.6	9.5	8.5	6.2	5.8	8.7	3.8	4.5
Kursk Oblast	10.1	17.2	10.9	12.6	10.87	9.78	11.48	8.51	6.9	7.1	4.8	5.6	5.1	6.5	4.8	2.9
Lipetsk Oblast	11	16.8	19.5	18.4	13.77	15.04	12.19	11.9	9.53	11.2	9.5	8.2	8.5	6.2	5.1	4.9
Moscow Oblast	11.1	38.2	30.9	29.3	26.45	22.83	22.07	18.32	15.81	13.9	12.3	10.5	10.7	9.2	8.8	6.9
Orel Oblast	11.4	18.1	14	10.6	9.16	8.02	10.01	4.05	5.93	5.2	3.8	4.8	4.7	4.2	3.4	4.1
Ryazan Oblast	12.1	29.4	19.6	17.1	7.31	7.11	5.61	5.55	4.45	3.2	3	3.2	3.4	3.7	3	3.9
Smolensk Oblast	21.2	21.9	33.6	27.4	26.2	16.29	19.62	17.01	12.58	11.3	10.3	8.9	9	8.2	8.5	6
Tambov Oblast	10.9	25.5	35.6	13.7	11.03	9.17	10.17	10.16	7.2	5.4	7.8	6.2	6.2	6.7	5	5.7
Tverskaya Oblast	14.5	33.1	39	34.7	28.9	24.36	23.39	19.95	17.14	15.3	13	11.1	11.9	10	7.5	8.5
Tula Oblast	16.9	32	32.3	24.7	18.5	18.01	16.31	15.85	12.4	10.3	9.2	9.9	8	8.6	8.2	6.4
Yaroslavl Oblast	13.6	30.1	28	23.3	16.95	14.29	15.57	11.55	8.83	9.5	7.6	6.7	6.9	5.9	5.7	5.4
Moscow	7.5	25.7	11.9	9.4	9.37	8.73	7.58	7.53	6.87	4.8	4.6	3.8	3.5	3.1	2.8	2.5
Northwestern Federal District	12.1	29.9	26.6	23.8	18.82	17.18	14.66	14.35	12.39	10.7	9.5	8.3	8.3	7.2	7.1	5.5
Republic of Karelia	14.7	39.6	28.3	24.3	17.98	18.52	15.24	12.39	12.3	14.9	10	9.7	11.8	8.2	6.8	6.4
Komi Republic	22.3	46.1	44.7	46.9	33.45	31.41	26.35	25.36	22.08	22	20.3	16.8	17.2	15.1	17	10.3
Arkhangelsk Oblast	14.8	35.5	33.7	38.4	27.01	22.92	18.5	18.09	17.87	14.7	12	11.6	14.1	14	11.7	9
Nenets Autonomous Okrug	N/A	31.9	41.4	33.4	47.6	45.21	26.13	14.24	25.95	21.1	21.1	32.6	16.2	29.8	15.9	11.3
Arkhangelsk Oblast (excluding Nenets AO)	N/A	N/A	N/A	N/A	N/A	N/A	N/A	N/A	N/A	N/A	N/A	N/A	14	13.4	11.5	8.9
Vologda Oblast	14.8	23.9	26.6	22.9	17.46	16.73	14.83	14.72	13.71	12	10.2	8.1	6	4.8	6.4	4.7
Kaliningrad Oblast	9.8	18.9	23.6	17.2	19.33	17.96	13.9	14	10.14	8.4	7.8	7.8	8.5	7.6	8	6.1
Leningrad Oblast	12.4	34.1	29.6	27.7	22.57	20.93	18.64	17.04	14.35	11.9	10.5	9.7	9.5	8	8.2	6.8
Murmansk Oblast	7	25.1	23.1	20.5	13.67	12.38	10.23	11.88	9.68	6.9	7	6	6.1	4.3	4.1	3.3
Novgorod Oblast	17.4	33.1	32.1	24.6	22.37	23.07	21.88	26.75	19.13	17.4	16.2	14.7	13	13.1	14.8	8.5
Pskov Oblast	12.9	24.4	28.7	29.4	23.35	18.04	15.12	14.72	12.7	11.2	12.3	11.7	9.9	9.6	7.9	6.9
Saint Petersburg	8.2	26.6	19.4	14.4	12.16	10.86	9.46	8.98	7.83	6.6	5.7	4.7	4.8	3.8	3.7	3.3
Southern Federal District	11.2	17.8	18.4	13.4	11.26	9.76	9.11	8.42	8.39	6.7	6.2	6.1	5.4	4.9	4.2	3.3
Republic of Adygea	12.9	21.1	20.1	13.8	13.36	12.71	12.48	12.66	9.48	5.9	5.4	6.3	4.7	4.5	6.4	4
Republic of Kalmykia	17.5	31.4	31.8	24.5	19.73	18.42	14.32	20.03	15.51	14.5	13.9	15.4	8.8	8.5	6.8	3.2
Krasnodar Krai	13.9	25.1	22.9	17.3	13.51	12.7	10.93	9.57	9.37	7.5	7	6.8	6.2	5.6	4.9	4.2
Astrakhan Oblast	13.9	14	20.7	17.4	14.3	14.59	10.19	9.15	8.73	6	5.3	4.7	2.7	2.8	1.8	1
Volgograd Oblast	12.9	22.1	23.9	20.2	14.95	13.81	12.94	12.14	10.25	9.1	7.1	7.9	6.9	6.4	4.1	2.5
Rostov Oblast	11.1	14.8	17	8.7	7.78	6.19	6.03	5.76	5.4	4.1	4.3	3.8	3.9	3.5	3.5	2.3
Sevastopol	N/A	N/A	N/A	N/A	N/A	N/A	N/A	N/A	N/A	N/A	N/A	N/A	N/A	4.8	3.1	5.4
North Caucasian Federal District	N/A	N/A	N/A	N/A	N/A	N/A	N/A	N/A	8.43	7.3	6.6	5.6	4.5	3.6	3.2	3
Republic of Dagestan	4.6	8.3	8.5	7	6.29	5.72	6.32	7.92	12.23	10.4	9	8	5.5	4	3.1	2.1
Republic of Ingushetia	N/A	14.7	14.3	9.5	9.19	13.91	12.91	18.95	15.54	11.4	10.4	5.4	3.3	4.7	4.4	4.1
Kabardino-Balkaria Republic	6.2	6.6	5.6	7.5	4.25	4.93	4.48	3.8	5.58	6.4	5.9	3.5	2	1.5	1.2	1.2
Karachay-Cherkess Republic	7.8	11.2	19.8	14.1	10.2	11.88	9.11	9.58	9.35	9	7.1	7.6	6.6	3.8	3.6	4.7
Republic of North Ossetia-Alania	10	9.9	17.7	8.5	7.26	4.7	9.24	5.41	4.13	5.9	5.1	4.8	3.8	1.6	2.7	2.7
Chechen Republic	8.5	N/A	N/A	13.2	12.86	8.02	4.66	0.96	0.86	1.3	1.9	1.4	1.7	0.7	1.1	1.1
Stavropol Krai	10.9	18.8	18	14.2	14.64	9.34	10.91	8.72	8.71	6.4	6.2	5.6	5.8	5.6	4.8	5
Volga Federal District	11.7	27.2	25.6	22.8	18.37	16.25	14.95	13.74	12.13	10.7	10.1	9.5	8.1	7.7	6.6	5.8
Republic of Bashkortostan	10.4	20.7	17.9	17.4	14.32	13.83	12.39	12.05	11.41	11.3	9.7	10	8.9	7.2	5.5	4.8
Mari El Republic	15.8	40.9	32.8	34.3	30.86	24.1	26.06	18.45	19.22	15.7	14.6	13	10.6	9.3	8.3	6.4
Republic of Mordovia	8	23.4	10.4	9.3	8.44	6.75	7.64	9.63	5.58	8.2	6.6	6	6	5.9	5.3	6.2
Republic of Tatarstan	7.8	30.9	19.5	16.2	13.79	10.97	10.48	8.63	8.81	7.9	7.9	7.3	6.6	5.3	4.5	3.5
Udmurt Republic	16.9	38.8	28.4	28.6	21.53	18.48	21.21	16.35	15.46	11.9	12.6	11.6	10.7	9.4	9.6	8.2
Chuvash Republic	10.5	15.4	25.6	20.4	16.05	13.94	13.43	10.71	8.77	8.3	5.9	6.5	6.6	8.3	5.7	4.4
Perm Krai	19.1	42.6	49.7	47.5	38.56	32.69	28.8	29.56	25.52	25	20.7	19.1	16.1	14.4	12.7	12
Komi-Permyak Okrug	N/A	N/A	N/A	N/A	N/A	45.56	49.8	47.78	43.32	N/A	N/A	N/A	N/A	N/A	N/A	N/A
Kirov Oblast	11.3	25.9	24.5	23.2	16.42	17.22	16.96	14.96	13.4	10	12.1	12.3	10.5	9.8	9.2	7.4
Nizhny Novgorod Oblast	10.3	22	21.8	22	15.2	14.4	12.25	10.66	8.79	5.7	5.4	5.8	4.2	6.1	5.4	5.5
Orenburg Oblast	14.9	34.8	33.6	25.2	23.9	17.81	18.89	17.62	15.01	14.8	14.4	12.1	10.7	10.3	9.5	8.4
Penza Oblast	9.4	16.7	22.2	18.6	12.77	13.22	8.53	10.97	9.28	8	8.4	8.1	6.5	6.6	5.2	4.7
Samara Oblast	10.7	21.8	21.8	20.2	16.2	15.89	13.29	12.7	11.22	8.8	9.1	8.2	6.5	5.3	4.4	4
Saratov Oblast	11.7	28.5	29.2	21.4	18.27	16.96	14.86	12.15	9.69	8.7	9.7	7.2	6.6	7.1	5.6	5.2
Ulyanovsk Oblast	9	22.6	22.3	16.7	13	10.1	9.17	9.83	8.41	7.1	6.5	6.1	4.9	5.6	5.2	3.1
Urals Federal District	18.5	41	36.9	30.7	24.13	19.66	19.88	18.38	15.72	13.7	12.7	12.7	12	10.7	9.1	7.7
Kurgan Oblast	15	33.8	36.7	36.8	29.48	22.23	23.37	23.02	22.72	18.6	15.7	19.2	17.7	15.9	12.6	12.1
Sverdlovsk Oblast	20.8	44.9	41.7	35.1	26.48	21.6	21.55	20.02	16.05	14.1	13.8	13.2	13.3	11.3	9.8	8
Tyumen Oblast	20.9	38.2	29.5	24.2	19.34	16.31	16.34	14.72	12.29	10.8	10.2	9.2	9.2	8.2	7.1	6.2
Khanty-Mansiysk Autonomous Okrug	N/A	39.1	29	23	17.73	13.85	12.96	13.49	9.96	7.6	7.7	6.9	7.9	5.7	4.6	5
Yamal-Nenets Autonomous Okrug	N/A	32.1	20.1	15.2	14.27	8.87	14.31	10.44	10.56	10.4	9.8	10.1	8.8	11	10.2	8.7
Tyumen Oblast (excluding Khanty-Mansiysk & Yamal-Nenets AO)	N/A	N/A	N/A	N/A	N/A	N/A	N/A	N/A	N/A	N/A	N/A	N/A	10.8	10	8.8	6.6
Chelyabinsk Oblast	14.7	40.5	37.4	29.5	24.24	19.71	20.24	18.62	16.8	14.7	13	13.9	11.9	11.3	9.4	7.7
Siberian Federal District	23.9	48.4	45.1	43.3	33.33	29.1	28	24.19	21.55	19.4	17	15.8	14	13.1	11.6	10.1
Altai Republic	40.6	60.2	47.4	44.1	34.67	25.23	27.4	25.7	29.3	25	27.7	27.9	25.9	15.8	16.2	16.5
Republic of Buryatia	24.3	50.8	58.6	68.8	56.15	42.24	45.55	39.15	35.94	29.7	32.2	27	23.5	22.6	19.2	18.8
Tyva Republic	76.5	137.1	130.4	119.5	102.08	91.86	85.08	85.06	79.22	63.7	66.7	56.3	36.9	31.7	32.1	24.9
Republic of Khakassia	22.4	40.1	40.8	24.8	22.89	17.33	19.91	17.83	13.9	17.5	13.7	11.8	10.8	12.1	11.9	11
Altai Krai	16.4	36.3	28.7	31.8	26.81	24.77	23.71	18.96	15.47	16.2	14	13	11.8	12	9.9	9.2
Zabaykalsky Krai	30.7	62.7	53.1	64.5	54.47	49.1	52.33	47.21	45.08	36.4	29.9	31	26.7	23.4	22	15.5
Agin-Buryat Autonomous Okrug	N/A	N/A	N/A	N/A	47.01	38.43	28.62	20.55	34.25	N/A	N/A	N/A	N/A	N/A	N/A	N/A
Krasnoyarsk Krai	20.6	42.1	43.9	35.7	22.85	20.71	18.41	17.34	14.62	14.4	13.3	12	11.8	12.4	11.1	9.5
Taymyr Autonomous Okrug	N/A	N/A	N/A	N/A	35.82	33.76	36.96	43.06	24.48	N/A	N/A	N/A	N/A	N/A	N/A	N/A
Evenk Autonomous Okrug	N/A	N/A	N/A	N/A	57.78	70.55	65.77	103.2	42.84	N/A	N/A	N/A	N/A	N/A	N/A	N/A
Irkutsk Oblast	32.5	67	73.3	72.7	50.21	39.11	37.31	31.19	27.2	26.5	21.7	19.6	18.8	17.2	15	11.9
Ust-Orda Buryat Okrug	N/A	N/A	N/A	N/A	36.57	42.45	33.37	28.09	27.98	N/A	N/A	N/A	N/A	N/A	N/A	N/A
Kemerovo Oblast	33.4	69.3	56.9	50.5	41.7	37.2	34.94	30.8	28.94	25.5	22.7	18.6	16.3	13.4	10.5	10.8
Novosibirsk Oblast	15.4	27.5	22.6	25.1	20.39	21.39	19.07	17.36	15.44	14	11.2	10.8	10.5	10.7	9.4	8
Omsk Oblast	13.3	31.1	28.1	25.7	18.13	15.67	14.34	9.69	7.36	5	2.4	4.8	4.2	3.8	4.8	4.6
Tomskaya Oblast	20	35.8	33.9	22	17.91	16.66	17.49	12.23	10.92	8.1	7.6	11.7	6.3	5.9	5.2	4.4
Far Eastern Federal District	22.9	44.6	45.2	44	36.23	33.36	31.88	28.3	25.05	23.6	21.6	21	17	16.2	14.4	12.5
Republic of Sakha (Yakutia)	26.5	26.1	52.8	52.8	43.9	42.18	39.71	33.16	34.22	27.2	27.8	25.4	21.9	20.7	20.1	17.4
Kamchatka Krai	14.7	33.1	26	26.8	19.47	29.96	25.17	21.54	16.95	17.1	14.4	10.9	15.6	12.6	7.6	6
Koryak Okrug	N/A	N/A	N/A	N/A	64.84	70.97	68.7	14.27	44.3	N/A	N/A	N/A	N/A	N/A	N/A	N/A
Primorski Krai	23.4	45.3	35.4	37.6	30.77	27.02	23.59	24.72	19.45	19.9	17.5	20.1	16.6	16.4	14	12.8
Khabarovsk Krai	26.6	55.9	61.9	51.4	41.93	39.11	38.58	32.12	29.09	26.5	22.1	19.4	11.9	9.4	7.4	7.8
Amur Oblast	23.7	38.3	35.8	45	36.73	28.61	31.89	28.48	26.39	29.3	29	27.4	22.9	24.2	22.8	17
Magadan Oblast	21.7	68.2	55.6	39.3	34.43	31.48	33.82	23.94	23.59	16	14.9	13.8	14	8.8	6.8	11.7
Sakhalin Oblast	16.2	52.9	43.9	39.9	35.03	34.38	33.21	28.8	21.56	16.9	16	15.2	12.4	13.7	12.1	9.4
Jewish Autonomous Oblast	20.6	50.9	61.3	52.8	46.73	37.2	37.76	21.05	22.72	32.9	27.5	32.4	21.7	20.2	25.9	13.4
Chukotka Autonomous Okrug	6.2	24.4	50.4	59.3	37.54	45.47	29.8	50.45	41.15	23.8	29.4	15.7	21.7	25.7	21.9	30
Crimean Federal District	N/A	N/A	N/A	N/A	N/A	N/A	N/A	N/A	N/A	N/A	N/A	N/A	N/A	7.5	6.2	
Moscow Oblast within the old borders	N/A	N/A	N/A	N/A	N/A	N/A	N/A	N/A	N/A	13.7	6.3	0	N/A	N/A	N/A	N/A
Moscow within the old borders	N/A	N/A	N/A	N/A	N/A	N/A	N/A	N/A	N/A	4.8	4.6	0	N/A	N/A	N/A	N/A

== List of the federal subjects of Russia by total murder count ==
Federal Subject	2006	2007	2008	2009	2010	2011	2012	2013	2014	2015	2016	2017
Russian Federation	28,513	24,885	23,427	21,121	18,660	16,406	14,945	13,912	12,561	11,679	10,331	8,844
Central Federal District	5,936	5,150	4,883	4,315	3,656	3,239	2,975	2,656	2,566	2,341	2,100	1,857
Belgorod Oblast	143	129	126	121	95	94	91	85	74	84	68	60
Bryansk Oblast	211	207	178	156	143	140	127	114	105	94	67	70
Vladimir Oblast	400	322	252	226	185	178	172	127	152	106	130	133
Voronezh Oblast	222	169	159	125	101	70	85	137	115	100	70	59
Ivanovo Oblast	239	188	195	203	149	112	113	105	65	76	80	72
Kaluga Oblast	124	107	112	110	110	110	110	87	78	77	67	55
Kostroma Oblast	116	95	95	79	59	63	56	41	38	57	25	29
Kursk Oblast	128	114	133	98	79	80	54	62	57	73	54	33
Lipetsk Oblast	162	176	142	138	110	131	111	95	98	72	59	56
Moscow Oblast	1,746	1,512	1,468	1,227	1,065	954	852	742	760	666	642	510
Orel Oblast	76	66	82	33	48	41	30	37	36	32	26	31
Ryazan Oblast	86	83	65	64	51	37	34	37	39	42	34	44
Smolensk Oblast	262	161	192	165	121	111	101	87	87	79	81	57
Tambov Oblast	124	102	112	111	78	59	84	67	66	71	52	59
Tverskaya Oblast	404	337	321	272	232	206	174	147	157	131	98	110
Tula Oblast	294	283	254	245	190	159	141	151	122	129	123	95
Yaroslavl Oblast	224	188	204	151	115	121	97	85	87	75	73	69
Moscow	975	911	793	791	725	573	543	450	430	377	351	315
Northwestern Federal District	2,556	2,321	1,975	1,928	1,662	1,459	1,291	1,141	1,151	995	990	764
Republic of Karelia	125	128	105	85	84	96	64	62	75	52	43	40
Komi Republic	329	306	255	243	210	198	181	148	150	131	146	88
Arkhangelsk Oblast	348	293	235	228	224	180	146	140	168	166	137	105
Nenets Autonomous Okrug	20	19	11	6	11	9	9	14	7	13	7	5
Arkhangelsk Oblast (excluding Nenets AO)									161	153	130	100
Vologda Oblast	215	205	181	179	166	144	122	97	72	57	76	55
Kaliningrad Oblast	181	168	130	131	95	79	74	74	82	74	78	60
Leningrad Oblast	369	341	303	277	233	203	181	169	167	142	145	121
Murmansk Oblast	118	106	87	100	81	55	55	47	47	33	31	25
Novgorod Oblast	148	151	142	172	122	110	102	92	81	81	91	52
Pskov Oblast	168	128	106	102	87	75	82	77	65	62	51	44
Saint Petersburg	555	495	431	411	360	319	284	235	244	197	192	174
Southern Federal District (to 2009)	2,564	2,224	2,082	1,930								
Southern Federal District (from 2010)					1,150	931	855	848	753	692	587	
Southern Federal District (from 29 jul. 2016)												541
Republic of Adygea	59	56	55	56	42	26	24	28	21	20	29	18
Republic of Kalmykia	57	53	41	57	44	42	40	44	25	24	19	9
Republic of Crimea										154	132	88
Krasnodar Krai	687	647	559	492	483	390	371	363	336	307	269	233
Astrakhan Oblast	142	145	102	92	88	61	54	48	27	29	18	10
Volgograd Oblast	393	361	337	315	265	238	183	204	178	163	105	63
Rostov Oblast	334	264	256	244	228	174	183	161	166	149	147	97
Sevastopol										19	13	23
North Caucasian Federal District					784	695	629	536	438	352	309	290
Republic of Dagestan	167	153	171	216	337	313	266	238	163	120	93	64
Republic of Ingushetia	45	69	65	97	81	48	45	24	15	22	21	20
Kabardino-Balkaria Republic	38	44	40	34	50	55	51	30	17	13	10	10
Karachay-Cherkess Republic	44	51	39	41	40	43	34	36	31	18	17	22
Republic of North Ossetia-Alania	51	33	65	38	29	42	36	34	27	11	19	19
Chechen Republic	151	96	57	12	11	17	25	19	23	10	15	15
Stavropol Krai	396	252	295	236	236	177	172	155	162	158	134	140
Volga Federal District	5,590	4,921	4,513	4,139	3,647	3,204	3,020	2,814	2,419	2,275	1,949	1,719
Republic of Bashkortostan	581	560	502	489	464	460	395	407	361	292	225	194
Mari El Republic	219	170	183	129	134	109	101	90	73	64	57	44
Republic of Mordovia	72	57	64	80	46	68	54	49	49	48	43	50
Republic of Tatarstan	518	412	394	325	333	300	299	280	252	206	175	137
Udmurt Republic	332	284	325	250	236	181	191	176	163	143	146	124
Chuvash Republic	207	179	172	137	112	104	73	81	82	103	70	54
Perm Krai	1,057	891	782	800	689	657	544	503	424	380	334	317
Komi-Permyak Okrug		59	64	61	55							
Kirov Oblast	236	245	239	209	186	134	160	162	138	128	119	95
Nizhny Novgorod Oblast	516	485	410	355	291	188	178	192	138	198	175	178
Orenburg Oblast	510	378	400	372	317	301	291	245	214	206	190	167
Penza Oblast	179	184	118	151	127	111	115	111	88	89	70	63
Samara Oblast	515	504	421	402	355	281	292	262	210	171	142	129
Saratov Oblast	475	439	383	312	248	219	244	179	165	176	138	128
Ulyanovsk Oblast	173	133	120	128	109	91	83	77	62	71	65	39
Urals Federal District	2,951	2,403	2,433	2,253	1,932	1,656	1,546	1,552	1.471	1,316	1,120	946
Kurgan Oblast	288	215	224	219	215	169	141	170	155	138	108	103
Sverdlovsk Oblast	1,165	949	946	879	705	607	596	572	573	488	423	346
Tyumen Oblast	644	547	553	502	423	369	356	325	328	296	259	228
Khanty-Mansiysk Autonomous Okrug	263	207	196	206	154	118	121	110	127	93	76	83
Yamal-Nenets Autonomous Okrug	76	48	78	57	58	55	53	55	48	60	55	47
Tyumen Oblast (excluding Khanty-Mansiysk & Yamal-Nenets AO)									153	143	128	98
Chelyabinsk Oblast	854	692	710	653	589	511	453	485	415	394	330	269
Siberian Federal District	6,547	5,696	5,474	4,728	4,216	3,739	3,275	3,051	2,706	2,530	2,237	1,954
Altai Republic	71	52	57	54	62	52	58	59	55	34	35	36
Republic of Buryatia	541	406	438	377	347	289	314	263	230	222	189	185
Tyva Republic	316	286	267	269	253	198	208	176	116	100	102	80
Republic of Khakassia	123	93	107	96	75	93	73	63	58	65	64	59
Altai Krai	680	624	594	473	385	392	336	312	281	286	235	218
Zabaykalsky Krai	614	551	586	528	504	403	329	340	292	255	239	167
Agin-Buryat Autonomous Okrug	35	29	22	16	27							
Krasnoyarsk Krai	663	599	532	501	423	408	378	342	337	355	318	273
Taymyr Autonomous Okrug	14	13	14	16	9							
Evenk Autonomous Okrug	10	12	11	17	7							
Irkutsk Oblast	1,267	983	936	782	681	644	526	474	456	416	361	286
Ust-Orda Buryat Okrug	49	57	45	38	38							
Kemerovo Oblast	1,180	1,049	985	868	815	703	624	510	446	365	284	291
Novosibirsk Oblast	539	564	502	458	409	373	301	292	286	294	259	221
Omsk Oblast	368	317	289	195	148	99	48	95	82	75	95	91
Tomskaya Oblast	185	172	181	127	114	85	80	125	67	63	56	47
Far Eastern Federal District	2,369	2,170	2,067	1,828	1,613	1,483	1,354	1,314	1,057	1,005	894	773
Republic of Sakha (Yakutia)	418	402	379	316	326	262	267	244	210	199	194	168
Kamchatka Krai	68	104	87	74	58	55	46	35	50	40	24	19
Koryak Okrug	15	16	15	3	9							
Primorski Krai	620	541	470	491	385	389	341	391	321	317	270	246
Khabarovsk Krai	591	549	541	450	407	356	297	260	160	126	99	104
Amur Oblast	323	250	277	246	227	242	238	224	186	196	184	136
Magadan Oblast	59	53	56	39	38	25	23	21	21	13	10	17
Sakhalin Oblast	184	179	172	148	110	84	79	75	61	67	59	46
Jewish Autonomous Oblast	87	69	70	39	42	58	48	56	37	34	43	22
Chukotka Autonomous Okrug	19	23	15	25	20	12	15	8	11	13	11	15
Crimean Federal District										173	145	
Moscow Oblast within the old borders						975	454	0				
Moscow within the old borders						552	532	442				

== See also ==
- Crime in Russia
- List of U.S. states by homicide rate
- List of Brazilian states by murder rate
- List of Mexican states by homicides
- List of cities by murder rate
- Homicide in world cities
