= Crime in Colorado =

Colorado generally has an elevated crime rate compared to national averages, but its ranking for specifically shooting-related crimes is closer to the middle nationally. The state's overall violent crime rate, however, is a primary concern, placing it among the highest in the U.S..

== Statistics ==
- Colorado has the 7th highest violent crime rate in the U.S. as of 2023 data, a ranking it also held in 2022. A 2025 report ranked Colorado as the second most dangerous state, factoring in both violent and property crime rates.
- The state's property crime rate is also high, ranking as the nation's 4th highest in 2023.
- Colorado ranks around 20th in the nation for the overall rate of gun deaths.
- While Colorado has a lower rate of firearm homicides compared to the U.S. average, it has a higher rate of firearm suicides. Suicides make up the largest portion (nearly 77%) of gun deaths in the state.
- In 2011, there were 151,125 crimes reported in Colorado.
- In 2008, there were 158,236 crimes reported in Colorado, including 156 murders, 141,107 property crimes, and 2,094 rapes.
- In 2024, approximately 32% of all violent crime in Colorado involved a firearm.
- The percentage of homicide deaths involving firearms in the state has increased over time, rising from 56% in 2010 to 71% in 2023.
- From 2020 to 2023, Colorado had a lower rate of mass shootings compared to the U.S. average, though 53 mass shooting incidents occurred during this period.
- In an average year, 850 people die from gun violence in Colorado.

== Capital punishment laws ==
Capital punishment is not applied in this state.

== Notable Incidents ==
Two of the country's largest mass shootings have occurred in Colorado: the Columbine High School massacre in 1999 and the Aurora movie theater massacre in 2012. As well as having one of the country’s worst mass murders and the state’s worst mass murder, being the Bombing of United Air Lines Flight 629. Other notable mass shootings in Colorado include the Colorado YWAM and New Life shootings in 2007, the Colorado Springs Planned Parenthood shooting in 2015, the National Western Complex shootout in Denver in 2016, the 2021 Boulder shooting, and the Colorado Springs nightclub shooting in 2022.

Notable Incidents
Incident	Category	Date	Description
Bombing of United Air Lines Flight 629	Bombing	1955- 01-11	The Bombing of United Air Lines Flight 629 was a bombing that occurred in the air near Weld County, Colorado, United States. Jack Gilbert Graham was the bomber behind it, whose own mother was on the flight. He placed a dynamite bomb in her luggage and detonated it, in an attempt to collect on her life insurance policy. He was later convicted of her death and sentenced to death where he was executed.
Columbine High School massacre	Mass shooting	1999-04-20	The Columbine High School massacre was a school shooting and attempted bombing that occurred at Columbine High School in Columbine, Colorado, United States, on April 20, 1999. The perpetrators, twelfth-grade students Eric Harris and Dylan Klebold, murdered 13 students and one teacher; ten were killed in the school library, where Harris and Klebold subsequently died by suicide.
2006 Platte Canyon High School hostage crisis	Mass shooting	2006-09-27	The Platte Canyon High School hostage crisis was a hostage taking and shooting at Platte Canyon High School in Bailey, Colorado, on September 27, 2006. The gunman, 53-year-old Duane Roger Morrison, took seven female students hostage and sexually assaulted them, later releasing four. When police broke open the classroom's door with explosives, Morrison opened fire with a semi-automatic pistol before shooting hostage Emily Keyes in the head.
STEM School Highlands Ranch shooting	Mass shooting	2019-05-07	On May 7, 2019, a school shooting occurred at STEM School Highlands Ranch, a charter school located in Douglas County, Colorado, United States, in the Denver suburb of Highlands Ranch. One student, Kendrick Castillo, was killed and eight others were injured. Two students, 16-year-old Alec McKinney and 18-year-old Devon Erickson, were convicted on dozens of charges and sentenced to life imprisonment.
Evergreen High School shooting	Mass shooting	2025-09-10	On September 10, 2025, 16-year-old Desmond Holly, a student at the school, arrived on school premises with a revolver and opened fire inside and outside the school. Holly shot and wounded two students; no one was killed.
Chuck E. Cheese's massacre	Mass shooting	1993-12-14	On December 14, 1993, four employees were shot and killed, and a fifth employee was seriously injured at a Chuck E. Cheese's (former ShowBiz Pizza Place) restaurant in Aurora, Colorado, United States. The perpetrator, 19-year-old Nathan Dunlap, a former employee of the restaurant, was frustrated about being fired five months prior to the shooting and sought revenge by committing the attack. He fled the scene of the shooting with stolen money and restaurant items.
2007 Colorado YWAM and New Life shootings	Shooting spree	2007-12-09	In the early morning hours of December 9, 2007, 24-year-old Matthew John Murray opened fire at the Youth With A Mission training center in Arvada, Colorado, killing two and wounding two others before escaping. Later that afternoon, he attacked the New Life Church in Colorado Springs, Colorado, with a number of firearms, killing two more people and injuring three before being shot by Jeanne Assam, a member of the church's safety team. Murray then committed suicide by shooting himself in the head.
2012 Aurora theater shooting	Mass shooting	2012-07-20	On July 20, 2012, a mass shooting occurred inside a Century 16 movie theater in Aurora, Colorado, United States, during a midnight screening of the film The Dark Knight Rises. Dressed in tactical clothing, 24-year-old James Eagan Holmes set off tear gas grenades and shot into the audience with multiple firearms. Twelve people, and an unborn baby, were killed and 70 others were injured, 58 of them due to gunfire.
Colorado Springs Planned Parenthood shooting	Mass shooting	2015-11-27	On November 27, 2015, a mass shooting occurred in a Planned Parenthood clinic in Colorado Springs, Colorado, resulting in the deaths of three people and injuries to nine. A police officer and two civilians were killed; five police officers and four civilians were injured. After a standoff that lasted five hours, police SWAT teams crashed armored vehicles into the lobby and the attacker surrendered.
October 2015 Colorado Springs shooting	Mass shooting	2015-10-31	Three people were randomly shot and killed by a gunman, later identified as 33-year-old Noah Harpham, as they were walking down Prospect Street near downtown Colorado Springs. A man riding a bicycle was the first victim shot after pleading for his life, according to eyewitness reports. The gunman then turned and ran, killing two women. These women were either killed randomly as the gunman ran down the street, firing at random or sitting on a porch targeted by the gunman. The gunman was later killed in a shootout with four police officers in which he was struck once.
2021 Boulder shooting	Mass shooting	2021-03-22	On March 22, 2021, a mass shooting occurred at a King Soopers supermarket in Boulder, Colorado, United States. Ten people were killed, including a local on-duty police officer. The shooter, 21-year-old Ahmad Al Aliwi Al-Issa, was arrested after being shot in the right leg. He was temporarily hospitalized before being moved to the county jail. After undergoing mental evaluations during the legal proceedings, Al-Issa was found mentally incompetent to stand trial in December 2021 and in April 2022. On August 23, 2023, prosecutors announced that Al-Issa was mentally competent to stand trial; a judge ruled as such on October 6 of that same year. On September 23, 2024, Al-Issa was found guilty in the shooting and sentenced to life in prison without the possibility of parole.
2021 Denver and Lakewood shootings	Shooting spree	2021-12-27	On December 27, 2021, a mass shooting occurred in downtown Denver and later moved to Lakewood, Colorado, United States, where 47-year-old Lyndon McLeod fatally shot five people and wounded two others. McLeod was fatally shot by Lakewood Police Agent Ashley Ferris, after the two exchanged gunfire.
Colorado Springs nightclub shooting	Mass shooting	2022-11-19	On November 19–20, 2022, an anti-LGBTQ–motivated mass shooting occurred at Club Q, a gay bar in Colorado Springs, Colorado, United States. Five people were killed, and twenty-five others were injured, nineteen of them by gunfire. The shooter, 22-year-old Anderson Lee Aldrich, was also injured while being restrained, and was taken to a local hospital. Aldrich was then charged and remanded in custody. On June 26, 2023, Aldrich pleaded guilty to the shooting and state level charges and was officially sentenced to a total of five consecutive life terms plus an additional consecutive 2,211 years, all without the possibility of parole. On January 16, 2024, Aldrich was additionally charged with 50 federal hate crimes in connection with the shooting. On June 18, 2024, Aldrich pleaded guilty to the federal charges and was sentenced to 55 concurrent life sentences without parole, plus a consecutive 190 years.
Hayman Fire	Arson	2002-06-08	Terry Barton, a forestry technician with the United States Forest Service, set the fire in a campfire ring during a total burn ban triggered by a National Weather Service red flag warning. Barton claimed that she was attempting to burn a letter from her estranged husband. This claim was disputed by one of her teenage daughters, who testified that a psychology teacher had told Barton to write her feelings in a letter and burn it. The fire quickly spread out of control and eventually torched over 138,000 acres (560 km^{2}) and burned across four different counties. A federal grand jury indicted Barton on four felony counts of arson.
Murder of Alan Berg	Domestic terrorism	1984-06-18	Berg was assassinated by members of the white supremacist group The Order, which believed in killing all Jews and sending all black people to Africa. Those involved in the killing were part of a group planning to kill prominent Jews such as Berg. Two of Berg's killers, David Lane and Bruce Pierce, were convicted on charges of federal civil rights violations for killing him. They were sentenced to 190 years and 252 years in prison, respectively.
Watts family murders	Murder	2018-08-13	In the early hours of August 13, 2018, in Frederick, Colorado, Christopher Lee Watts murdered his pregnant wife Shanann (34) by strangulation, and their two children Bella (4) and Celeste (3) by suffocation. He buried Shanann in a shallow grave near an oil-storage facility, and dumped his children's bodies into crude oil tanks. Watts initially maintained his innocence in his family's disappearance, but was arrested on August 15, after confessing in an interview with detectives to murdering Shanann. Months later, he also admitted to murdering his children.
Killing of JonBenét Ramsey	Murder	1996-12-25	JonBenét Patricia Ramsey (August 6, 1990 – December 25, 1996) was an American child who was killed at age six in her family's home at 755 15th Street in Boulder, Colorado, on the night of December 25, 1996. Her body was found in the house's basement about seven hours after she had been reported missing. She had sustained a fractured skull, and a garrote was tied around her neck. The autopsy report stated that JonBenét's official cause of death was "asphyxia by strangulation associated with craniocerebral trauma". Her death was ruled a homicide, and the case generated worldwide public and media interest.
Murder of Jessica Ridgeway	Murder	2012-10-05	Jessica Ridgeway was a 10-year-old girl from Westminster, Colorado who was strangled to death on October 5, 2012, by then 17-year-old Austin Sigg after he abducted her while she was walking to school and took her to his bedroom. He then dismembered her body and dumped her torso inside plastic bags along a roadway where it would be found. Prior to Ridgeway's kidnapping, Sigg had attempted to abduct a woman while she was jogging on May 28, 2012, but she had escaped and reported the assault to authorities.
Granby 'Killdozer' Incident	Vehicle-ramming attack	2004-06-04	On June 4, 2004, Heemeyer used a bulldozer to demolish the Granby town hall, the house of a former mayor, and several other buildings. He committed suicide after the bulldozer became stuck in the debris of a hardware store he was destroying. No one else was injured or killed.
Diol–Beye family murders	Arson/Murder	2020-08-05	The Diol–Beye family murders resulted from an arson attack that occurred on August 5, 2020, in Denver, Colorado. The attack killed five members of Senegalese immigrant families and was perpetrated by three teenagers seeking revenge for a stolen phone, which they had mistakenly traced to the wrong address.
1998 Alma rampage	Vehicle-ramming attack	1998-02-26	The 1998 Alma rampage was a murder and vehicle-ramming attack in the small Colorado town on February 26 and 27.
Killing of Elijah McClain	Homicide	2019-08-24	Elijah Jovan McClain (February 25, 1996 – August 30, 2019) was a 23-year-old black American man from Aurora, Colorado, who was killed as a result of being illegally injected with 500 mg of ketamine by paramedics after being forcibly detained by police officers. He went into cardiac arrest and died six days later in the hospital. He had been walking home from a convenience store. Three police officers and two paramedics were charged with his death. Both paramedics and one of the officers were convicted of negligent homicide. The other two officers were acquitted of all charges.

== See also ==
- Law of Colorado
- List of shootings in Colorado
- Timeline of Colorado history
