= Crime in South Carolina =

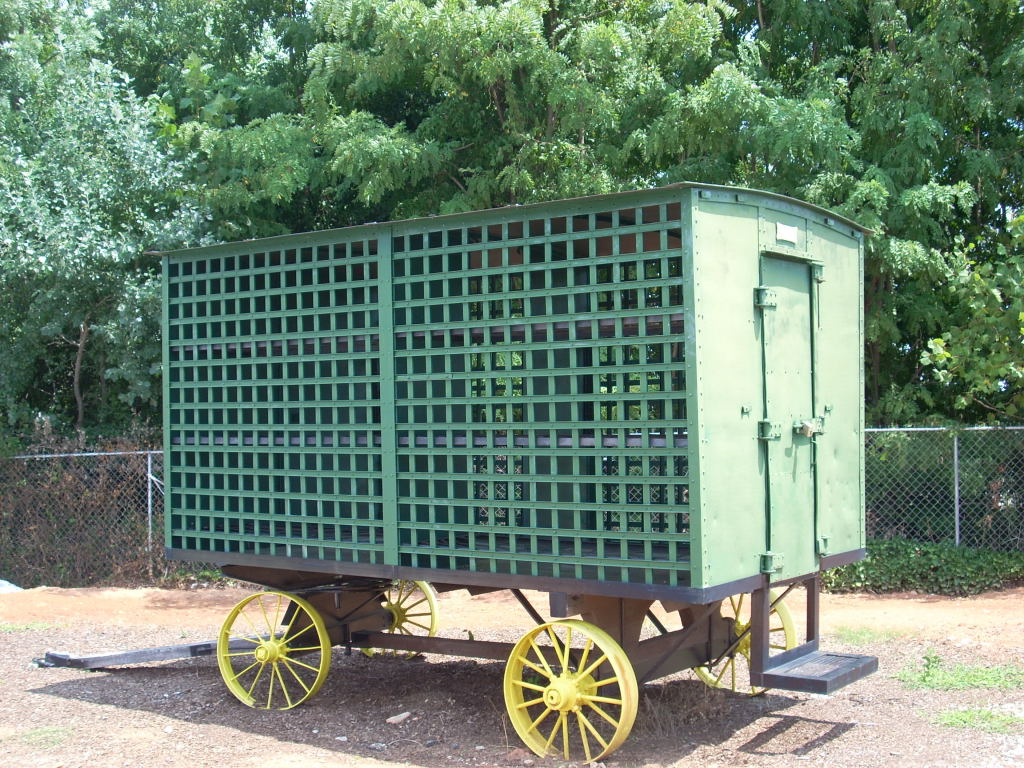
Oconee County Cage, South Carolina

In 2008 there were 192,751 crimes reported in the U.S. state of South Carolina, including 307 murders. In 2014 there were 174,269 crimes reported, including 311 murders. In 2016, there was a total of 185,824 total crimes reported, with 24,896 of them being of violent nature. In 2019, there were 177,712 crimes reported, which included 26,323 of those being violent crimes. In 2024, there was a total of 134,764 crimes reported, which was roughly a ~24.17% decrease from 2019. In addition, the county with the highest crime rate for 2024 was Dillion county, with a high rate of around 118 violent crimes per 10,000 residents.

== Capital punishment laws ==
Capital punishment is applied in the state of South Carolina.

== Notable Cases ==
1978 - Murder of Betty Gardner

1996 - David Mark Hill

1999 to 2000- Reinaldo Rivera

2005 - Stephen Stanko

2008 - Killing of Ronald Eugene Woodham IV

2009 - Murder of Brittanee Drexel

2009 - Patrick Tracy Burris

2009 - Disappearance of Susan Powell

2015 - Charleston church shooting

2022 - Murders of Maggie and Paul Murdaugh

2026 - Dyvonte Collins
