= Killing of Ronald Eugene Woodham IV =

American homicide victim

- Facial reconstruction of Woodham created for identification purposes.
- Location: Conway, South Carolina, U.S.
- Date: December 4, 2008; 17 years ago
- Attack type: Child homicide by exposure, hypothermia, filicide
- Victim: Ronald Eugene Woodham IV
- Perpetrator: Jennifer Lynn Sahr
- Motive: Unconfirmed; Sahr claimed her motive was panic after unexpectedly giving birth
- Charges: Homicide by child abuse (dropped after plea deal)
- Verdict: Pleaded guilty
- Convictions: Voluntary manslaughter
- Sentence: 4 years in prison (released after 3 months) (Note: Plus 6-year suspended sentence and a $1,700 fine.)

Ronald Eugene Woodham IV (c. December 3, 2008 – December 4, 2008) was a formerly unidentified American newborn baby and homicide victim whose body was found off of South Carolina Highway 544, on the outskirts of Conway in Horry County, South Carolina on December 4, 2008. Known as "Baby Boy Horry" while unidentified, his case remained cold for over 11 years, until his parents were identified in March 2020. His mother, Jennifer Sahr, left him in a box on the side of Highway 544, leaving him to die of hypothermia. Sahr was arrested in March 2020, and pleaded guilty to manslaughter in his death in 2022. In June 2023, she was sentenced to 4 years in prison. She was released early in September 2023, after serving two and a half years.

== Investigation ==
The deceased infant was located by utility workers in the area wrapped in a tote bag, and placed inside of a box in a wooded area along the highway. Coroner reports made it apparent that the infant had died of hypothermia, due to exposure to the elements, but was otherwise viable at the time of death. The child remained unidentified when the case eventually ran out of leads, and was declared a cold case.

On March 3, 2020, the Horry County Police Department released new information regarding the case, initially supplied by the child's father, Ronald Woodham III. Jennifer Lynn Sahr, formerly Rickel, 32, of Pensacola, Florida, who was a student of Coastal Carolina University at the time, was arrested in North Myrtle Beach following the release of physical evidence confirming her as the mother of Baby Boy Horry. Sahr was incarcerated at the J. Reuben Long Detention Center in Conway on March 4, 2020, charged with the count of homicide by child abuse, where she faced 20 years to life imprisonment for her crime. On March 6, Sahr was denied during a bond hearing. At this hearing, Solicitor Jimmy Richardson read a letter, penned by the child's father, Ronald Woodham III, on his behalf, as he was not in the court. The letter read:

"At this time, I would like to ask for privacy and respect for my family as we grieve over the death of my first and only born child and son. Again, I would like to thank everyone involved in bringing justice to my baby boy. I would also like to thank Rolling Thunder Motorcycle Club for all they have done, as well as the community members who made sure my child was never alone on any of his birthdays. I would like to ask for prayers during this difficult time as we all grieve for Baby Boy Horry."

== Legal proceedings ==
Following Jennifer Sahr's arrest, she was initially charged with homicide by child abuse and was later released on bail. If tried and convicted of that charge, she would have faced a prison sentence of 20 years to life without parole. On September 15, 2022, Sahr pleaded guilty to the lesser charge of voluntary manslaughter in the killing of Baby Boy Horry as part of a plea deal, with the homicide by child abuse charge dropped.

Sahr's attorney, Morgan Martin, detailed Sahr's account of how the killing of the baby unfolded. According to Sahr's account, while she was in her sophomore year at Coastal Carolina University, she had a brief relationship with another student, Ronald Woodham III, with whom she had engaged in sexual intercourse. In August 2008, she had visited a doctor on the university's campus due to feeling unwell, with numbness in her hands and feet. Sahr claimed she was never told she was pregnant. Later in December 2008, she was in her room in the house she had been staying in, when she began excessively bleeding and was in excruciating pain. She gave birth to the baby and then passed out. When she awoke, the baby "showed no signs of life like crying, or moving". Sahr later left the baby in a bag inside a box on the side of Highway 544. Martin claimed that there is "no proof [the baby] was alive when Sahr left [him] along Meadowbrook Road", a claim which is contradicted by the baby's autopsy, in which it was shown he had air in his lungs and concluded he had suffered homicide-induced hypothermia. Martin conceded that air being in the baby's lungs was evidence that he was alive when Sahr abandoned him, but claimed that it "could be because of decomposition".

In 2020, Ronald Woodham III was informed of the case and that it had been determined through DNA that Baby Boy Horry was his child. Woodham stated, "The day I was informed of my son's existence and murder, my world stopped spinning; I was in complete shock and full of every emotion imaginable. I've questioned God. Why him? And why me?" When asked if he could guess who the mother or killer may be, to both he immediately answered that he suspected it was Sahr. He has expressed frustration that the court has seemingly not taken his circumstances into account when determining Sahr's sentencing for the killing of the baby.

Following Sahr's plea deal for manslaughter, she stated to the court,

"I'm solely standing here by the grace of God. I prayed for strength to be able to talk today. All I wanted to project to every single person in this courtroom is 'I'm sorry.' I am truly sorry. That night, I couldn't provide the help that I needed for my child and I've lived with it the rest of my life. All else I can do is try every day to be a better person and a better mother for my two daughters, whether physically there or not. And I'm asking for forgiveness and I pray for your peace. I have been suffering a long time. And I pray that somehow, some way, you can forgive me. I'm very sorry. And I'm praying for every single person in this courtroom."

Sahr faced between two and 30 years in prison, and prosecution had asked for at least 20 years in prison.

On June 15, 2023, it was announced that the baby's father had named him Ronald Eugene Woodham IV.

On June 16, 2023, Sahr was sentenced to 4 years in prison with credit for 2 1/2 years served, plus a 6-year suspended sentence following release and a $1,700 restitution fine which will be allocated to the coroner's office for travel and autopsy expenses, with the judge stating that Sahr's current children were "the most important factor" in the sentence. Ronald IV's father, Ronald III stated that he had great sympathy for Sahr, but criticized her lenient sentence, stating that he worried what kind of message a "slap on the wrist" sentence sends.

On September 29, 2023, Sahr was released early from prison under community supervision.

== See also ==
- List of solved missing person cases (post-2000)
