= Crime in Connecticut =

Crime rates in Connecticut are lower than in the United States as a whole and have fallen significantly over the past decade, according to the 2021 Crime in Connecticut Report. This pattern holds true overall, and for most types of crime.

== Statistics ==
The total offense rate in Connecticut is 1,718 offenses per 100,000 (as of 2021), considerably below the national rate of 2,329 per 100,000. The report also includes Crime Index statistics, used to compare across states, which is based on the rates of several crimes against persons (murder, rape, robbery, and aggravated assault), and several property crimes (burglary, larceny-theft, and motor vehicle theft). The Crime Index fell by 30 percent in Connecticut from 2012 to 2021, from 87,853 crimes to 61,070.

Violent crime rates in Connecticut are at their lowest point since 1974. The rate is less than half the national rate: 167 per 100,000 residents in Connecticut, compared to a national rate of 396 per 100,000 residents. As of 2020, Connecticut has the fifth lowest rate of violent crime of U.S. states and territories, behind Maine, New Hampshire, Puerto Rico, and Vermont. And the rate of violent crime fell over 40 percent between 2012 and 2021 (from 289 to 167 per 100,000), whereas the national violent crime rate did not change significantly over that period.

Property crimes have also fallen over the past decade. In 2010, 78,386 property crimes and 10,057 violent crimes, including 130 instances of murder and 583 instances of rape were reported. In 2015, property crimes had fallen slightly, to 73,703, and violent crimes had fallen significantly, to 7,925 violent crimes (a decline of 22%). The decline continued through 2017, as reported in Connecticut's Uniform Crime Report. According to the report, 8,186 violent crimes were committed, of which 105 were homicides, 831 were rapes, 2,819 were robberies and 4,431 were aggravated assaults.

== Notable incidents ==
Notable events related to crime in Connecticut include:

=== Cheshire home invasion murders ===
The Cheshire home invasion murders of three people occurred on July 23, 2007. Jennifer Hawke-Petit and her two daughters were raped and murdered by the two invaders, Steven Hayes and Joshua Komisarjevsky. Hawke-Petit's husband, Dr. William Petit, was beaten unconscious but survived. The two perpetrators received death sentences in 2010 and 2012 respectively but were resentenced in 2015, when Connecticut abolished the death penalty. Steven Hayes was resentenced in 2016 to six life terms in prison. In 2017, Joshua Komisarjevsky and his lawyers filed a motion with the state Supreme Court for a new trial, claiming judicial errors during the pre-trial process.

=== Silk family murders ===
On June 10, 1999, Kelly Silk, a mother of 4 suffering from Postpartum depression, attacked her husband, Charles Silk, in his sleep, stabbing him to death, before attacking her 9-year-old daughter Jessica. Kelly then using gasoline from the lawn mower, set the residence on fire, that ended up killing her 3-year-old daughter, Jennifer and her 17- month old son, Jonah. Only two children would survive the murders, being Jessica and her brother Joshua. A legal battle would occur afterwards determining the custody of the children.

=== Hartford Distributors shooting ===
The Hartford Distributors shooting on August 3, 2010, was a mass shooting at a beer distribution company in Manchester, Connecticut. 34-year-old former employee Omar Thornton fatally shot 8 coworkers and injured 2 others with a Ruger SR9 semi-automatic pistol. After hiding in an office, Thornton called 911 and told the operator that he was motivated by alleged racism he had experienced in the workplace. As police closed in, Thornton committed suicide by shooting himself in the head.

=== Sandy Hook Elementary School shooting ===
At approximately 9:30 a.m. on December 14, 2012, 20-year-old Adam Lanza fatally shot twenty school children and six school employees before committing suicide at Sandy Hook Elementary School in Newtown, Connecticut. Lanza had murdered his mother, who worked in the school, prior to the shooting. This incident remains one of the deadliest mass shootings in the United States, with the fourth-highest gunshot victim fatalities for a single shooting in U.S. history.

=== The murder of Helle Crafts ===
The 1986 Murder of Helle Crafts, a Danish flight attendant murdered by her husband, American Richard Crafts, in Newtown, Connecticut, was notable for the method in which Richard disposed of her body using a woodchipper. It was also the case that lead to Connecticut’s first conviction of a murder without a body.

== Capital punishment ==
Between 1616 and 2005, 126 people were sentenced to death and executed in Connecticut. In April 2012, Governor Dannel Malloy signed an order to abolish the death penalty; Connecticut was the 17th state in the nation to do so. Inmates formerly sentenced to death had their sentences reduced to life imprisonment without parole. Connecticut was the fifth state to abolish the death penalty between 2007 and 2012.

== Cities with highest crime rates ==
According to a 2014 FBI Uniform Crime Report, the Connecticut cities with the most violent crimes were Bridgeport (1,338), New Haven (1,380) and Hartford (1,380). Possible reasons for the higher crime rates in these cities include their larger populations and widespread poverty.

CT Cities with the Highest Number of Cases of Violent Crime (2014)
Type of Crime	Bridgeport	New Haven	Hartford
Total Num. Incidents	1338	1380	1380
Homicide	11	19	12
Rape	92	80	45
Robbery	546	502	591

== Juvenile system ==
Connecticut has a state-level system that includes juvenile courts, detention centers, private facilities, and juvenile correctional facilities. After juveniles are released, they receive help from the Court Support Services Division of the Connecticut Judicial Branch and from the Department of Children and Family Services. Criminal statutes for juveniles and adults are the same. However, if the offender is under the age of 16, they will be sent to a juvenile detention center and transferred over to Adult Court once they turn 16. State assistance for juvenile offenders has a number of objectives: to lower the rate of repeat offending in the community, provide offender rehabilitation, and help offenders understand the consequences of their actions. Police officers who encounter juveniles breaking the law may warn them, talk to their parents, offer organizations that can provide them with assistance, and/or make an arrest. Underage offenders who are arrested must attend a hearing in front of a judge at a superior court who will decide whether or not to send them to a detention center.

== Marijuana laws ==
Cannabis is legal in Connecticut. Residents over the age of 21 can legally possess and consume marijuana. Possession of 1.5 oz of cannabis is legal. All adults can grow up to three mature and three immature plants at home, with a cap of twelve total plants per household.

== See also ==
- Donna Lee Bakery murders
- Lorne J. Acquin
- Michael Bruce Ross
- Murder of Martha Moxley
