= Crime in Illinois =

In 2008, there were 446,135 crimes reported in the U.S. state of Illinois, including 790 murders.

== State statistics ==
Crime in Illinois (2019)
	Violent Crime					Property Crime			
		Murder	Rape	Robbery	Aggravated assault		Burglary	Larceny-theft	Motor vehicle theft
Total	51,561	832	6,078	12,464	32,187	233,984	34,433	180,776	18,775
Rate per 100,000 inhabitants	406.9	6.6	48.0	98.4	254.0	1,846.5	271.7	1,426.6	148.2

== Policing ==
In 2019, Illinois had 846 state and local law enforcement agencies. Those agencies employed a total of 48,240 staff. Of the total staff, 38,539 were sworn officers (defined as those with general arrest powers). Illinois has 303 sworn officers per 100,000 residents.

== Capital punishment laws ==
Capital punishment is not applied in Illinois. It was abolished by Governor Pat Quinn on March 9, 2011.

== Notable incidents ==
- 1993 - Brown's Chicken massacre
- 2021 - Highland Park parade shooting

== See also ==
- Law of Illinois
- Crime in Chicago
- Crime in the United States

== Bibliography ==
- Russo, Gus (2002). The Outfit: The Role of Chicago's Underworld in the Shaping of Modern America. Bloomsbury USA. ISBN 1-58234-279-2.
