= Crime in Missouri =

Missouri
- Crime rates* (2011)

Violent crimes
- Homicide: 6.1
- Rape: 24.3
- Robbery: 104.3
- Aggravated assault: 312.7
- Total violent crime: 447.4

Property crimes
- Burglary: 745.7
- Larceny-theft: 2308.3
- Total property crime: 3308.8
- Note: Reported crimes per 100,000 population Source: FBI 2011 UCR data

Crime in Missouri is recorded through the state's Uniform Crime Reporting (UCR) program. Since 2001, law enforcement agencies in Missouri have been required to submit crime data monthly to the Missouri State Highway Patrol, which compiles the data and forwards information to the Federal Bureau of Investigation for national crime statistics.

== Capital punishment laws ==
Capital punishment is a sentencing option for first-degree murder in Missouri when the offender was at least 18 years old at the time of the offense.
