= Crime in Oklahoma =

In 2008, there were 145,144 crimes reported in the U.S. state of Oklahoma, including 212 murders. In 2014, there were 131,726 crimes reported, including 175 murders. In 2021, there were 246,310 crimes reported, including 246 murders.

On April 19, 1995, 168 people were murdered in the Oklahoma City bombing.

On June 13, 1977, three young girls were raped and murdered at Camp Scott, a Girl Scout camp located in Mayes County, Oklahoma .The case remains unsolved.

== Capital punishment laws ==
Capital punishment is applied in this state. It has been carried out using lethal injection since the death penalty was federally reinstated in 1976. However, there has been an informal moratorium on executions as of 2021 due to difficulty finding the drugs required for the state's cocktail method of execution. This ended in October of the same year.

Since the commutation of Julius Jones' sentence in 2021, mere hours before he was scheduled to die, the process has been met with public scrutiny. Even prior to this incident, the sparing of Richard Glossip's life only an hour before his planned death by former governor Mary Fallin using an emergency stay of execution after one of the drugs that was going to be used to kill him was found not to be up to state standards by an attending doctor.
