= Crime in Michigan =

In 2019, 43,686 crimes were reported in the U.S. state of Michigan. Crime statistics vary widely by location. For example, Dearborn has a murder rate of only 2.1 per 100,000 while sharing borders with Detroit (43.5 per 100,000) and Inkster (24.2 per 100,000), some of the highest rates in the state.

== State statistics ==
Crime in Michigan (2019)
Population: 9,986,857	Violent Crime					Property Crime			
Population: 9,986,857	Total	Murder and nonnegligent manslaughter	Rape	Robbery	Aggravated assault	Total	Burglary	Larceny-theft	Motor-vehicle theft
Total	43,686	556	7,235	5,350	30,545	158,296	28,572	111,980	17,744
Rate per 100,000 inhabitants	437.4	5.6	72.4	53.6	305.9	1,585.0	286.1	1,121.3	177.7

== By location ==
=== Detroit ===
Detroit had the 2nd highest violent crime rate in the nation in 2015 among cities with a population greater than 50,000. In 2013, with only 7% of the state population, the city of Detroit had 50% of all murders recorded in Michigan.

Detroit recorded 295 homicides in 2015 down from the recent high of 386 in 2012. The number of homicides peaked in 1974 at 714 and again in 1991 with 615. By the end of 2010, the homicide count fell to 308 for the year with an estimated population of just over 900,000, the lowest count and rate since 1967. According to a 2007 analysis, Detroit officials noted that about 65 to 70 percent of homicides in the city were confined to a narcotics catalyst.

The city has faced many cases of arson each year on Devil's Night, the evening before Halloween. The Angel's Night campaign, launched in the late 1990s, draws many volunteers to patrol the streets during Halloween week. The effort reduced arson: while there were 810 fires set in 1984, this was reduced to 742 in 1996. In recent years, fires on this three-night period have dropped even further. In 2009, the Detroit Fire Department reported 119 fires over this period, of which 91 were classified as suspected arsons.

=== Flint ===
The city of Flint has recorded murder rates higher than those of Detroit in some years. For example, in 2013 Flint had a murder rate of 48 per 100,000 compared to Detroit's 45. Flint's population fell below 100,000 and it is no longer tracked among the statistics of major cities.

=== Benton Harbor ===
The small city of Benton Harbor, population 10,000, had the highest total crime rate and highest property crime rate in Michigan in 2012. Its murder rate was the third highest in the state.

=== Grand Rapids ===
The second-largest city in Michigan, Grand Rapids recorded a murder rate of 13.8 per 100,000 in 2020, more than double of the United States rate of 7.8 per 100,000. The overall crime rate declined by one-third between 2003 and 2011, but Grand Rapids set a record with 38 homicides in 2020.

== Policing ==
In 2018, Michigan had 564 state and local law enforcement agencies. Those agencies employed a total of 25,742 staff. Of the total staff, 18,193 were sworn officers (defined as those with general arrest powers).

=== Police ratio ===
In 2018, Michigan had 182 police officers per 100,000 residents.

== See also ==
- Law of Michigan
- List of homicides in Michigan
- Crime in the United States
