= Crime in West Virginia =

In 2014 there were 43,236 crimes reported in the U.S. state of West Virginia, including 74 murders.

== State statistics ==
In 2008 there were 51,376 crimes reported in West Virginia, including 67 murders. West Virginia's ten worst cities statistically to live in are Fairmont, South Charleston, Martinsburg, Morgantown, Clarksburg, Parkersburg, Beckley, Wheeling, Charleston and Huntington with an annual crime rate of 394.

== Capital punishment laws ==
Capital punishment is not applied in this state.
