= Crime in New Jersey =

As of 2013, there was a reported 192,971 crimes in the U.S. state of New Jersey, including 401 murders. This is an overall decrease in total crimes reported, but an increase in murders.

The Federal Bureau of Investigation has a field office in New Jersey, located in Newark.

== By location ==
=== Camden ===
Camden has been ranked among the most dangerous cities in the United States in 2002, 2004, 2005, and 2009.

== Capital punishment laws ==
Capital punishment is not applied in this state. New Jersey was the first state to repeal the use of the death penalty after the Supreme Court restored the use of capital punishment in the Gregg v. Georgia case.

== Drugs ==
Akbar Pray, Newark resident, was sentenced to life in prison in 1990 for leading a drugs gang that had dominated the city's drug trade since the early 1970s.

== See also ==
- Law of New Jersey
