= Crime in North Carolina =

In 2008, there were 415,810 crimes reported in the U.S. state of North Carolina, including 605 murders. In 2014, there were 318,464 crimes reported, including 510 murders.

Between 2003 and 2012, there were an average of 15,255 vehicle thefts per year in North Carolina.

== Policing ==
In 2008, North Carolina had 504 state and local law enforcement agencies. Those agencies employed a total of 35,140 staff. Of the total staff, 23,442 were sworn officers (defined as those with general arrest powers).

=== Police ratio ===
In 2008, North Carolina had 380 police officers per 100,000 residents, in which 254 are sworn officers.

== Adjudication ==
State criminal charges in North Carolina are adjudicated by the unified Judicial System known as the General Court of Justice of the North Carolina Judicial Branch. At least one courthouse is located in each county of the state. Misdemeanor charges are tried in the District Courts, while the Superior Court has original jurisdiction over felony charges. Aside from when a law enforcement officer issues a criminal citation, criminal processes typically begin when a judicial official, usually a magistrate, issues processes such as a Warrant for Arrest, a Magistrate's Order following a warrantless arrest, or a Criminal Summons upon the testimony of a prosecuting witness or witnesses, with the primary prosecuting witness known as the complainant. Alternately, a prosecutor can bring charges to a grand jury for indictment. Following an arrest, at an initial appearance, a judicial official sets the bail bond and other conditions of release.

Pleas of not guilty a lead to misdemeanor bench trials in District Court of the county where the crime was charged, with an appeal going to jury trial in Superior Court. All felony trials are jury trials held in Superior court, although some preliminary hearings including the first appearance often occur in District Court before a probable cause hearing, a waiver of the same, or indictment by grand jury.

The prosecuting attorneys representing the State of North Carolina are the elected District Attorney and their assistants. North Carolina has 43 prosecutorial districts, each consisting of up to seven counties. Criminal defendants who cannot to afford a private defense attorney are served by Indigent Defense Services, a state agency, through a public defender's office in certain judicial districts or a court appointed private attorney.

Convictions for criminal offences are sentenced under the Structured Sentencing the system introduced in 1994 to standardize sentences with increased sentences for offenders with lengthy criminal records. Punishment for impaired driving convictions is the only exception to Structured Sentencing, which are punished under the prior sentencing system.

== Capital punishment laws ==
Capital punishment is applied in this state. No executions have occurred since 2006. The methods of execution are lethal injection, electric chair, and firing squad.

== Notable cases ==
1998 - Murders of Bobby Whitt and Myoung Hwa Cho

2000 - Disappearance of Asha Degree

2008 - Murder of Eve Carson

2011- Murder of Erica Parsons

2012 - Killing of Faith Hedgepeth

2015 - Chapel Hill Shooting

2019 - 2019 University of North Carolina at Charlotte shooting

2022 - 2022 Raleigh shootings

2023 - Killing of Zijie Yan

2025 - Killing of Iryna Zarutska

== See also ==
- Law of North Carolina
