= Crime in Kansas =

In 2018, there were 89,468 crimes reported in the U.S. state of Kansas. 12,782 of these were violent offenses, including 113 murders.

== Capital punishment laws ==
Capital punishment is applied in this state.
