= Crime in Alabama =

Alabama
- Crime rates* (2019)

Violent crimes
- Homicide: 7.3
- Rape: 42.2
- Robbery: 80.4
- Aggravated assault: 381.0
- Total violent crime: 510.8

Property crimes
- Burglary: 531.9
- Larceny-theft: 1,886.1
- Motor vehicle theft: 28.9
- Total property crime: 2,674.4
- Notes *Number of reported crimes per 100,000 population. * Alabama did not report arson statistics Source

Crime rates in Alabama overall have declined by 17% since 2005. Trends in crime within Alabama have largely been driven by a reduction in property crime by 25%. There has been a small increase in the number of violent crimes since 2005, which has seen an increase of 9% In 2020, there were 511 violent crime offenses per 100,000 population. Alabama was ranked 44th in violent crime out of a total 50 states in the United States.

== History ==
Following Secession in the United States in 1861, Alabama fought direly for the preservation of slavery. Even though the South was soundly defeated, Alabama underwent minor changes following the Reconstruction era. African Americans remained nominally free but segregated, impoverished, imprisoned over the slightest suspicion and with few options but to flee the state to northern latitudes or the newly conquered West. The resurgence of the Ku Klux Klan during the 19th century reinforced institutionalized White supremacist ideals and facilitated greater incidents of crime and violence in the state. Jim Crow laws limited the rights of Black people and ushered in violent reactions from both White and Black populations. During the period of Reconstruction, the Ku Klux Klan became regularly involved in acts of crime and violence. Hostility toward Black populations saw a rise in arson and murder, particularly against the growth of the agricultural independence of freedmen. Property crime during this period was prevalent. Violence and protest in rural counties of Alabama were common, particularly in Birmingham, Alabama. The Ku Klux Klan gained significant political and Social control during the period between 1920 and 1930 in Birmingham, leading to an increase in Nightriding which involved kidnappings, floggings and even lynchings.

The Civil rights movement in America saw a wave of increased protest and violence against Black injustice. The Selma to Montgomery marches on March 7, 1965, involved the killing of Viola Liuzzo and the brutal violence against activists by state troops. During the Civil Rights movement between the 1950s and 1960s, extremist gangs and hate crime increased and continued into the 1970s. Racial hate and Crime organisations like the Ku Klux Klan increased membership between this time from between 35,000 and 50,000.

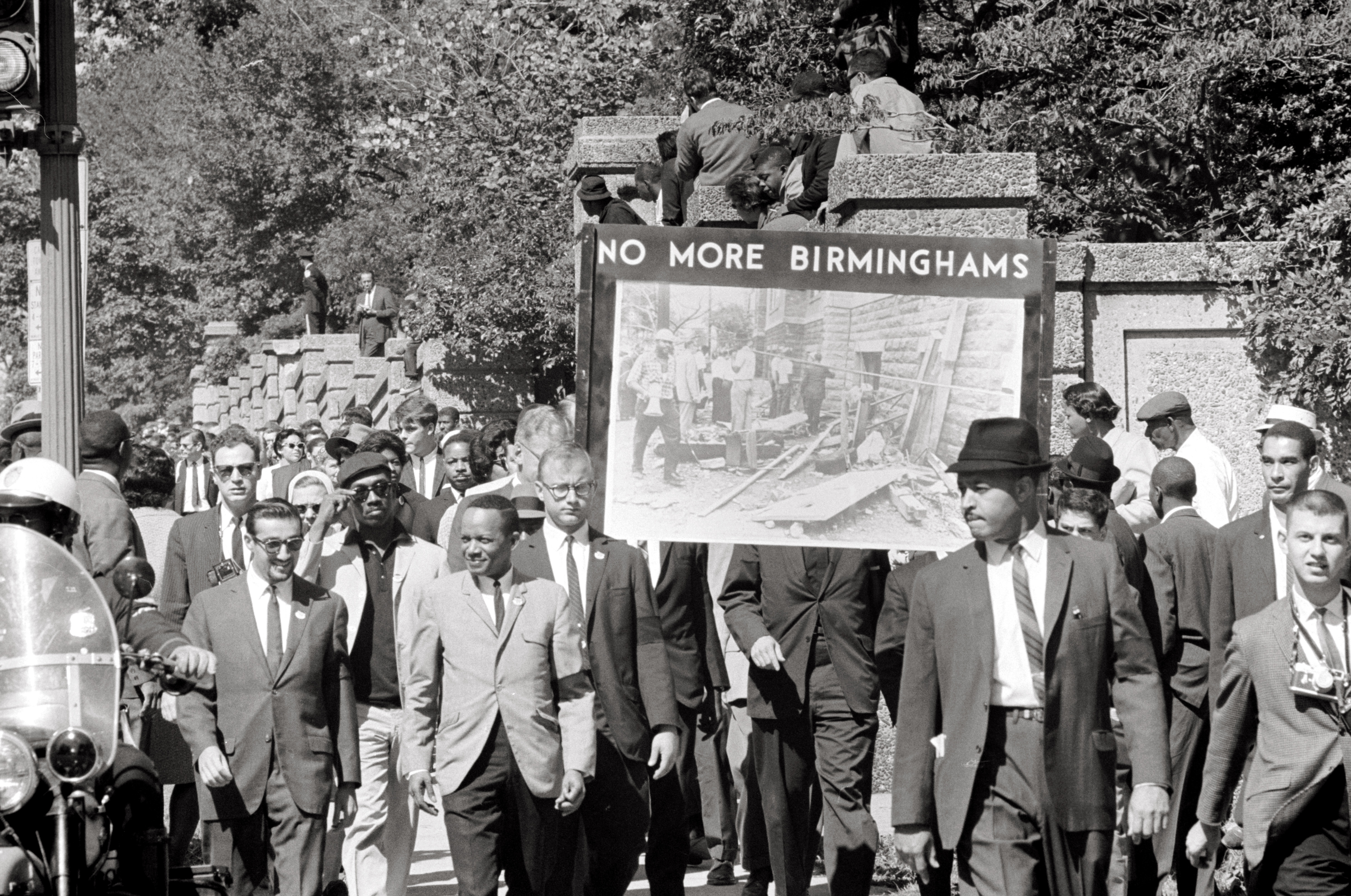
Congress of Racial Equality and members of the All Souls Church march in memory of the 16th Street Baptist Church bombing victims on September 22, 1963.

The Ku Klux Klan was responsible for the 16th Street Baptist Church Bombing in 1963. Bombs were placed under the Church killing four children: Cynthia Wesler, Carole Robertson, Addie Collins and Denise McNair. This led to increased investigation into the crimes of the Klan, convicting Robert Chambliss in 1977, who was head of the Klan, as well as Thomas Blanton Jr. who was convicted of murder and sentenced to life in prison. In 2002, Bobby Frank Cherry was convicted of murder and received a life prison sentence from his involvement in the bombing. Attempts to prevent increased crime from organisations such as the Ku Klux Klan include the 'highly secretive and extra-legal domestic covert action program' COINTELPRO-WHITE HATE aimed at exposing and disrupting Klan activities in the United States and Alabama. This program incorporated the use of informants, spies and information tracking mechanism. This included the well known FBI informant and Klan member Gary Thomas Rowe.

== Statistics ==
In 2008, there were 211,401 crimes reported in Alabama, including 357 murders, 190,292 property crimes, and 1,618 rapes. In 2014, there were 174,821 crimes reported in Alabama, including 276 murders, 154,094 property crimes, and 1,436 rapes. Alabama had the third highest homicide rate in the US in 2016, with 407 violent deaths categorized as murder or manslaughter, according to statistics released by the FBI. Nearly 26,000 violent crimes were reported in 2016 in the state. In 2020 there have been, in Jefferson County alone, 134 homicides, including 95 in the state's biggest city, Birmingham. In 2021, the violent crime rate dipped by 2% from 5.2 incidents per 1,000 from 5.1 in 2020. Alabama is still 38% higher than the national average in Violent and Property crime. Aggravated assault accounts for 75% of all violent crime in Alabama, which is 10% higher than the nationwide proportion. Robberies also account for 16% of all violent crimes, 27% lower than the nationwide proportion.

=== Homicide in Alabama ===
Homicide in Alabama is the least common crime in Alabama, with less than 400 homicides each year from 2005 to 2019, compared to larceny which saw over 106,000 cases in 2010 and 109,000 in 2011.

=== Gun crime ===
Gun Death rates have increased greatly by 31% between 2014 and 2019. There has been a sharp increase in firearm homicide of 67% between the same period. In 2019, more than 1000 people died from gun violence in Alabama

== Capital punishment laws ==
Capital punishment is applied in this state.

=== History ===
Alabama's legal executions date all the way back to 1812 when a man named Eli Norman was convicted of murder and hanged. All executions from 1812 to 1926 were largely hangings until 1927 when the primary method became electrocution. Alabama's electric chair was called "Yellow Mama." Since 2002, Alabama's main method of execution has been lethal injection. In 2018, nitrogen gas became a legal method of execution.

In 2012, The Supreme Court declared that assigning children of seventeen years of age or younger to life in prison without the possibility of parole is unconstitutional, as of Miller v. Alabama and Jackson v. Hobbs.

There have been multiple instances of malpractice regarding Alabama executions within the 21st Century. In 2011, Alabama used illegally bought drugs to execute Jason Williams via lethal injection. In 2022, the three-hour execution of Joe James in Atmore, Alabama was recorded as the longest "botched lethal-injection" in U.S. history.

== Abortion in Alabama ==
Abortion in Alabama is illegal as of the overturn of Roe v Wade, except in cases where the life of the mother is threatened.

== Prison system in Alabama ==
=== History ===
During the 19th century, Alabama was run by a county, without a state prison system. County officials such as Sheriffs were one of the only means of security. Alabama's first state prison, Wetumpka State Penitentiary, was established in 1839.

=== Prison crime ===
Prison killings and suicides are a common occurrence in U.S state prisons. In 2020, Alabama's prison homicide rate of 69 per 100,000 incarcerated persons was almost nine times that of the recent national average.

Prison violence has not just occurred by inmates, but also from correctional officers. In 2011, Lt. Michael A. Smith, a senior officer involved in the beating of an inmate, Rocrast Mack, was charged with intentional murder. A very rare case for officers and staff to be charged with murder. The case was later deferred to federal prosecutors, with Smith and three other prison officials faced civil rights offenses. Smith was convicted at trial, while the other three officers pleaded guilty. Smith was sentenced to 30 years in federal prison, while the other three officers each received prison terms ranging from 5 to 7 years.

== Government initiatives ==
In 2017, the United States governor, Kay Ivey, awarded grants totaling $646,513 to aid non-profit organizations in southeast Alabama to support victims of crime. This included, $120,513 to assist domestic violence victims in Dale and Geneva counties, $76,000 to assist child victims of sexual assault and abuse in Covington County, as well as $238,000 to help child abuse victims in Dale, Geneva, Henry and Houston counties.

== Crime rates by year ==
The below table of data Crime Rates includes the total crimes which is an amount associated with all different types of crimes, as well as Property Crimes, Homicide, Rape, Robbery, Burglary, Assault, Larceny and Motor Vehicle. A common standard of measurement in crime rates accounts for the number of crimes per 100,000 population.

Crime rates in Alabama 1973–2019 - rates per 100,000 population
Year	Total offenses	Property	Homicide	Rape	Robbery	Burglary	Assault	Larceny	Motor vehicle
1973	2582.3	2232.2	13.1	21.2	79.4	881.9	236.2	1655.9	227.4
1974	3000.1	2627.2	14.9	22.6	99.4	1058.0	235.7	1308.7	260.6
1975	3472.5	3079.6	15.9	20.4	122.9	1163.8	233.5	1645.6	270.2
1976	3800.3	3419.5	15.1	21.6	96	1170	255.9	1987.3	262.3
1977	3939.6	3501.6	15.1	26.4	102.1	1197.6	294.3	1989.5	295.1
1978	3905.8	3492.4	13.2	48.7	98.5	1217.7	276.4	1974.2	300.6
1979	4222.1	3812.2	13.0	53.2	112.2	1286.6	259.7	2216.8	308.7
1980	4867.4	4424.4	13.0	56.9	131.1	1507.2	269.2	2607.4	309.8
1981	4793.6	4334.1	11.4	49.1	123.9	1411.8	298.7	2642.3	280.0
1982	4615.0	4169.9	10.4	49.7	112.2	1249.6	296.6	2647.6	272.6
1983	4127.0	3708.0	9.0	46.0	100.0	1079.0	286.0	2390.0	233.0
1984	3995.8	3554.2	9.6	49.3	99.1	1025.2	307.2	2289.0	240.0
1985	3915.8	3462.2	9.7	51.6	105.2	1027.1	312.1	2177.7	257.1
1986	4167.1	3623.3	9.8	53.3	109.9	1127.0	396.3	2236.3	260.0
1987	4444.8	3886.7	9.5	53.6	113.3	1196.1	407.4	2427.1	263.5
1988	4296.3	3768.7	9.3	54.1	111.2	1163.7	379.0	2354.3	250.8
1989	4472.6	3898.8	9.9	57.8	131.6	1102.3	402.2	2509.7	286.8
1990	4808.7	4116.1	11.4	61.4	141.7	1078.2	507.6	2694.8	343.7
1991	5131.4	4306.0	10.8	65.9	149.2	1215.9	631.1	2739.7	350.4
1992	4901.7	4082.3	10.5	70.0	156.7	1098.9	615.7	2641.7	341.7
1993	4737.4	3987.5	11.3	63.8	159.4	1049.4	546.1	2611.3	326.8
1994	4830.6	4144.3	11.9	65.1	169.1	1024.2	471.6	2794.6	325.5
1995	4802.1	4181.0	11.0	59.1	181.0	1010.8	398.4	2825.9	344.4
1996	4761.6	4186.3	10.1	61.0	160.7	983.8	373.4	2842.8	359.7
1997	4804.6	4233.8	9.6	60.0	158.4	973.2	371.6	2913.8	346.8
1998	4438.0	3914.1	7.9	61.7	126.8	894.1	357.1	2700.1	330.2
1999	4272.1	3790.6	7.8	60.8	120.2	848.0	324.0	2650.8	291.8
2000	4298.1	3801.6	7.1	59.5	118.5	827.6	340.1	2710.5	263.6
2001	4097.6	3652.4	7.8	117.3	117.3	838.6	290.1	2549.0	264.8
2002	4278.5	3849.2	6.6	67.2	127.1	894.4	260.6	2657.3	297.5
2003	4317.8	3904.5	6.6	66.7	128.4	913.3	243.7	2671.7	319.5
2004	4317.7	3896.0	6.2	70.7	128.5	947.3	250.2	2650.8	297.9
2005	4136.9	3709.3	7.3	63.9	135.0	905.4	252.0	2528.0	275.9
2006	3996.5	3583.5	7.7	61.6	142.7	888.6	230.5	2406.6	288.5
2007	4205.2	3777.2	8.5	58.5	151.0	931.6	238.1	2562.3	283.2
2008	4330.4	3891.8	7.3	62.9	151.6	1023.1	247.0	2596.3	272.4
2009	4032.0	3603.7	6.8	62.9	128.5	990.9	262.7	2387.7	225.2
2010	3739.6	3358.0	5.3	50.2	95.8	854.8	254.3	2292.0	211.1
2011	3983.5	3561.1	6.8	56.2	101.7	1050.0	285.1	2297.1	214.0
2012	3769.2	3336.6	6.7	50.4	99.4	933.0	300.3	2211.8	191.8
2013	3598.0	3179.6	7.1	41.0	93.4	831.3	277.0	2140.5	207.8
2014	3392.5	2987.8	5.6	39.0	92.4	770.3	267.8	2020.1	197.3
2015	3343.8	2885.3	7.3	40.9	92.7	703.0	317.6	1976.6	205.7
2016	3403.1	2885.2	8.1	38.5	93.7	683.6	377.6	1967.4	234.2
2017	3,471.5	2,949.1	8.6	41.0	86.8	641.4	386.0	2,045.2	262.5
2018	3,360.9	2,837.8	7.8	41.6	82.8	595.4	390.9	1,970.8	271.6
2019	3,185.2	2,674.4	7.3	42.2	80.4	531.9	381.0	1,886.1	256.5
