= Crime in Alaska =

Crime in Alaska has attracted significant attention, both within the state and nationally, due to its unique challenges and higher crime rates compared to the rest of the United States. A sparsely populated state with vast wilderness areas, Alaska poses particular difficulties for law enforcement and social service agencies.

Capital punishment is not applied in Alaska, having been abolished by the territorial legislature prior to statehood.

== Crime rates ==
As of the latest data available, Alaska has one of the highest crime rates per capita in the United States, particularly in the categories of violent crime and property crime. The state often tops the charts for rates of sexual assault, domestic violence, and suicide.

=== Violent crimes ===
Violent crimes, which include murder, rape, robbery, and aggravated assault, occur at a significantly higher rate in Alaska compared to the national average. Some areas, particularly rural communities, face staggering rates of violent crime. In 2024, the violent crime rate was 724 per 100,000 population, the highest of any US state.

=== Property crimes ===
The incidence of property crimes like burglary, theft, and car theft is also notably higher in Alaska than in the rest of the United States. Property crime rates are often exacerbated by the state's unique geographical features, which can make it easier for criminals to evade capture.

== Contributing factors ==
=== Geographic isolation ===
The vast geography and isolated communities in Alaska create logistical challenges for law enforcement agencies. Response times can be long, and the costs of maintaining a robust police presence in remote areas are high.

=== Substance abuse ===
Alcohol and drug abuse are pervasive issues in Alaska, contributing significantly to both violent and non-violent crimes.

== Law enforcement strategies ==
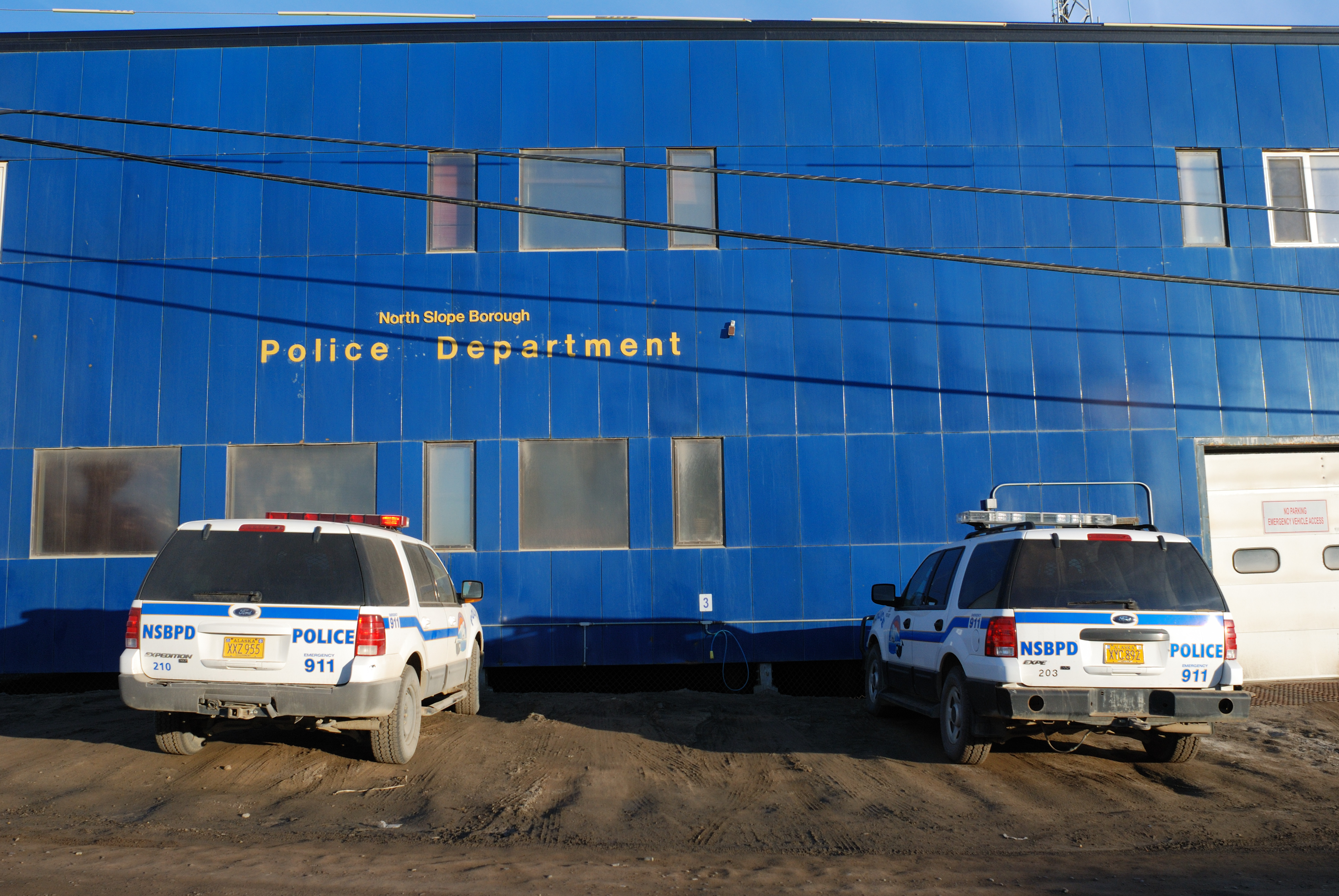
North Slope Borough police station

=== Community policing ===
To tackle the challenges of geography and isolation, some Alaskan communities have turned to community policing models, in which local residents are trained and empowered to take on some law enforcement duties.

=== Federal assistance ===
The federal government has stepped in to provide additional resources, including funding and manpower, to combat crime in the state.

=== Technological advancements ===
New technologies, such as drones and advanced communication systems, are being adopted to overcome the challenges of geography and improve response times.

== Notable crimes ==
=== Pre-statehood ===
One of the most infamous criminals during Alaska's pre-statehood era was Soapy Smith. He was killed in 1898 during a shootout on Juneau Wharf.

=== Modern era ===
- Robert Hansen was a notorious criminal who abducted, sexually assaulted, and killed between 17 and possibly more than 30 women in and around Anchorage, Alaska.
- In 1983, Louis D. Hastings carried out an attack in McCarthy, Alaska, killing 6 people and wounding 2 more. His aim was to sabotage the Trans-Alaska Pipeline System.
- Michael Silka is known for the murder of as many as nine individuals in the areas surrounding Fairbanks and Manley Hot Springs in 1984.
- James Dale Ritchie was responsible for the deaths of at least five people and the wounding of a police officer in Anchorage in 2016.

== See also ==
- List of Alaska state prisons
