= Crime in Texas =

In 2014 there were 923,348 crimes reported in the U.S. state of Texas, including 1,184 murders and 8,236 rapes.

== State statistics ==
Number of crimes (by year)
Year	Population	Total crimes	Violent crimes	Property crimes	Violent crimes				Property crimes		
Year	Population	Total crimes	Violent crimes	Property crimes	Murder	Forcible rape	Robbery	Aggravated assault	Burglary	Larceny	Vehicle theft
1960	9,579,677	212,407	15,428	196,979	824	892	3,031	10,681	57,589	123,415	15,975
1970	11,196,000	467,248	40,897	426,351	1,299	2,329	15,280	21,989	129,866	251,091	45,394
1980	14,169,829	870,458	77,978	792,480	2,392	6,700	29,547	39,339	262,600	450,792	79,088
1990	16,986,510	1,329,494	129,343	1,200,151	2,389	8,750	44,297	73,907	314,512	731,224	154,415
2000	20,851,820	1,033,311	113,653	919,658	1,238	7,856	30,257	74,302	188,975	637,522	93,161
2010	25,253,466	1,064,477	113,231	951,246	1,249	7,622	32,843	71,517	228,597	654,626	68,023
Source: http://www.disastercenter.com/crime/txcrime.htm

Crime rates: number of crimes per 100,000 persons (by year)
Year	Population	Total crime rate	Violent crime rate	Property crime rate	Violent crime rates				Property crime rates		
Year	Population	Total crime rate	Violent crime rate	Property crime rate	Murder	Forcible rape	Robbery	Aggravated assault	Burglary	Larceny	Vehicle theft
1960	9,579,677	2,217.3	161.0	2,056.2	8.6	9.3	31.6	111.5	601.2	1,288.3	166.8
1970	11,196,000	4,173.3	365.3	3,808.1	11.6	20.8	136.5	196.4	1,159.9	2,242.7	405.4
1980	14,169,829	6,143.0	550.3	5,592.7	16.9	47.3	208.5	277.6	1,853.2	3,181.4	558.1
1990	16,986,510	7,826.8	761.4	7,065.3	14.1	51.5	260.8	435.1	1,851.5	4,304.7	909.0
2000	20,851,820	4,955.5	545.1	4,410.4	5.9	37.7	145.1	356.3	906.3	3,057.4	446.8
2010	25,253,466	4,215.2	448.4	3,766.8	4.9	30.2	130.1	283.2	905.2	2,592.2	269.4
Source: http://www.disastercenter.com/crime/txcrime.htm

== Policing ==
In 2008, Texas had 1,913 state and local law enforcement agencies. Those agencies employed a total of 96,116 staff. Of the total staff, 59,219 were sworn officers (defined as those with general arrest powers).

=== Police ratio ===
In 2008, Texas had 244 police officers per 100,000 residents.

According to the Texas Commission on Law Enforcement (TCOLE), the state average for police officers per 100,000 residents in Texas is 241 as of 2021. However, the ratio can vary among different cities and counties in Texas.

== Capital punishment laws ==
Capital punishment is applied under Texas state law for capital murder if the perpetrator is 18 years of age and older and the prosecutor seeks the death penalty.

The federal death penalty may also be used in certain circumstances.

== Incarceration ==
In 1974 the Texas Department of Corrections (TDC), since merged into the Texas Department of Criminal Justice (TDCJ), had about 17,000 prisoners; 44% were black, 39% were non-Hispanic white, 16% were Hispanic and Latino, and 1% were of other races. 96% were male and 4% were female. At the time all 14 prison units of the TDC were in Southeast Texas.

In 1974 the Federal Bureau of Prisons (BOP) operated four federal prisons in Texas: FCI Texarkana, FCI Seagoville, FPC Bryan (for women), and FCI La Tuna. These prisons had a combined population of about 2,300.

== See also ==
- Crime in the United States
- Crime in Houston
- Law of Texas
