= Crime in Massachusetts =

Crime in Massachusetts refers to crime occurring within the U.S. state of Massachusetts.

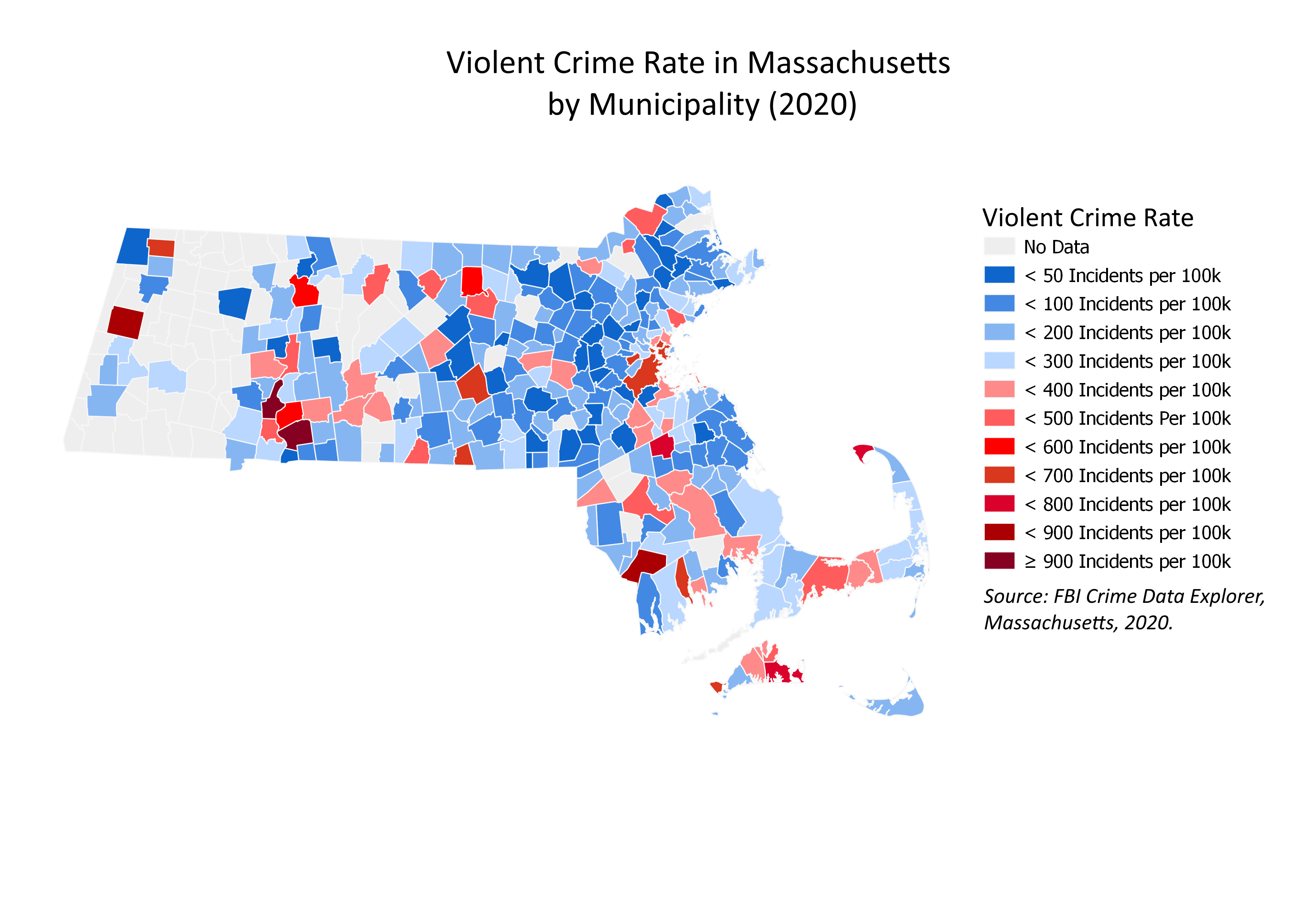
Violent crime rates by municipality (2020)

== Capital punishment laws ==
Capital punishment is not applied in this state. However, the Constitution of the Commonwealth of Massachusetts explicitly authorizes the Massachusetts Legislature (General Court) to enact statutes providing for capital punishment. Since the abolition of capital punishment in the Commonwealth, attempts have been made by supporters of capital punishment to reestablish it in Massachusetts; however, these attempts have failed in the Legislature.

== Criminal law ==
Current prisoners convicted of felonies may not vote. However, Massachusetts does not prohibit former prisoners convicted of felonies from voting.

Massachusetts' conspiracy law is broader than most other states in the nation, as it does not require a direct act. If a felony were discussed, it would constitute conspiracy though no one took any overt action.

== See also ==
- Law of Massachusetts
- Boston Marathon bombing
- Patriarca crime family
- Whitey Bulger
- Lady of the Dunes
