= Crime in Virginia =

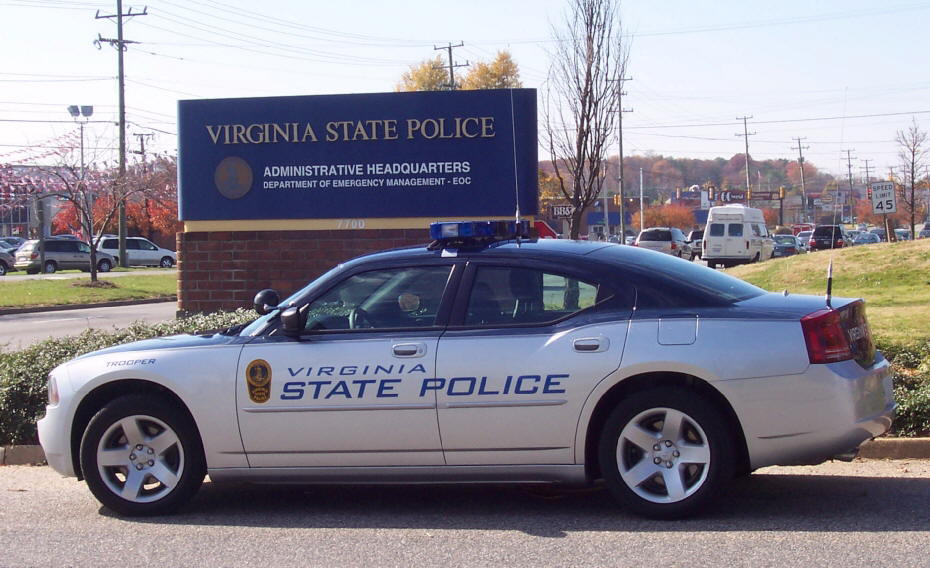
Virginia State Police vehicle in front of their headquarters. The agency publishes detailed annual information on crime in Virginia.

Crime in Virginia broadly refers to the commission, investigation and punishment of unlawful acts in the Commonwealth of Virginia. Given the length and diverse geography of the state, crime levels fluctuate significantly, driven by factors such as population density, urbanization, economic conditions and the effectiveness of available law enforcement. Like other U.S. states, investigation and punishment of crimes in Virginia is divided between local, state and federal entities, each with different jurisdictions. The 2025 annual report from the Virginia State Police, which covered all reported crimes in 2024, showed violent crimes in Virginia continuing to decrease from 2022, though hate crimes have increased. The prior trend from 2014 to 2022 had shown a gradual increase in violent crime, while property crimes decreased over the same period.

== Crime rates ==
As of 2024, Virginia had significantly lower rates of both violent and property crimes than the United States average, with violent crime almost 40% below the national average. Violent crime rates in the state had been generally increasing after 2014, before peaking in 2022 and then going down. Virginia State Police recorded 16,853 offenses classified as violent crimes in 2024, including murder, rape, and robbery, which represented a 7% overall decrease from 2023. Most of these crimes occurred at night, and almost half happened inside peoples' homes.

The Virginia cities with the highest rate of violent crimes in 2024, according to Virginia State Police data, were Emporia and Petersburg, which each had more than ten violent crimes per thousand people. The cities with the highest rates of murder and nonnegligent homicide were Petersburg and Portsmouth.

== Crime investigation and law enforcement ==
Crime investigation and law enforcement in Virginia is based on and funded by jurisdiction, federal, state, and local. As of 2024, Virginia alone employed 29,388 full time law enforcement employees, comprising a wide variety of agencies with state, county, city, college and university officers. Under the Constitution of Virginia, sheriffs are the locally elected law enforcement officers for their respective cities and counties. Sheriffs share responsibilities with police forces in larger cities in the state.

== Criminal Justice Outcomes ==
Crime statistics measure offenses reported and arrests made; case outcomes describe what happens after a charge is filed in court. An analysis of 190,783 resolved criminal cases filed in Virginia courts in calendar year 2025 found that 46.0% did not result in conviction: 28.6% (54,571 cases) ended in nolle prosequi (the Commonwealth's Attorney's decision not to proceed), 15.0% (28,546) were judicially dismissed, and 2.4% (4,589) resulted in acquittal.

Outcomes vary substantially across Virginia jurisdictions. Among the 81 jurisdictions with at least 500 resolved criminal cases in 2025, the share of cases not resulting in conviction ranged from 6.7% in Brunswick County to 67.1% in Richmond City.

== Capital punishment ==
Capital punishment for crimes was abolished in this state when Governor Ralph Northam signed a bill into law on March 24, 2021. Before that date, both the electric chair and lethal injection were used to execute prisoners.

Before the abolishing of capital punishment, state and federal officials would sometimes opt to send violent criminals to face trial in Virginia rather than their current state, due to Virginia judges being more willing to carry out executions. For example, when the “Beltway sniper” was arrested for 10 killings in the Washington area in 2002, federal authorities decided to send him to Virginia for prosecution, even though most of the shootings took place in suburban Maryland.

== See also ==
- Law of Virginia
