= Crime in Ohio =

Since 1960, the U.S. state of Ohio has seen a wide variation in the frequency of violent crimes reported. In 2014, there were 33,030 violent crimes reported - the lowest rate the state has seen since 1973. In 2012 there were 405,262 crimes reported in Ohio, including 478 murders. In 2014 there were 357,558 crimes reported, including 464 murders.

== Law enforcement ==
In 2008, Ohio had 831 state and local law enforcement agencies. Those agencies employed a total of 37,295 staff. Of the total staff, 25,992 were sworn officers (defined as those with general arrest powers). In 2008, Ohio had 225 police officers per 100,000 residents.

In 2014, the United States Department of Justice published a report that investigated the use of force by the Cleveland Police Department from 2010-2013. The Justice Department found a pattern of excessive force including the use of firearms, tasers, fists, and chemical spray that unnecessarily escalated nonviolent situations, including against the mentally ill and people who were already restrained. As a result of the Justice Department report, the city of Cleveland has agreed to a consent decree to revise its policies and implement new independent oversight over the police force.

== The economics of crime in Ohio ==
The above image depicts the average number of Ohioans incarcerated per 100,000 citizens in the state. The steepest increase occurred between 1980-1995, with numbers plateauing between 2007-2015.

=== Taxation and the Ohio prison system ===
The Ohio prison system is the sixth largest state prison system in the United States, and it is operated by the Ohio Department of Rehabilitation and Correction. As of 2015, the cost per prisoner was approximately $69 per day. As of November 2016, Ohio's prison population consisted of 51,064 inmates. Overcrowding in prisons has been an issue in the state, with that rate sitting at 132.1% in 2016. The funding of the criminal justice field by the state has been on the decline (a cut of $150 million in the last ten years), and prisons are receiving less money as the prison population is growing. The rates of violent crime in Ohio have decreased throughout the last few years, but the prison population has not decreased with the reduction in violent crime. Nationally, states contribute about 5% of their overall funds to the corrections field.

Nurses have been logging in more overtime hours in the Ohio prison system, and it is costing the state's taxpayers millions of dollars. Potential nursing candidates do not want to work in the correctional environment, and supply is not meeting demand. With a shortage of nurses, there is no choice but to send those already hired into overtime pay to properly supply inmates with the care they need.

=== Socioeconomic status and crime ===
Ohio's unemployment rate was 4.6% as of August 2018, with its highest rate of unemployment occurring in January 2010 (11.1%). There are racial disparities in Ohio's prison system, with African Americans and Latinos being overrepresented compared to the number of whites. In 2010, African Americans were over five times more likely to be incarcerated than whites in Ohio, and Latinos were two times more likely than whites. Studies show that high rates of crime and poverty are usually located within the same geographical areas. These studies indicate that where there is unemployment, there is poverty, and where there is poverty, there are often minorities. Research also shows that inequalities among races can influence the crime rate within a given area.

=== Employment in the criminal justice system of Ohio ===
As of May 2016, Ohio employed 74,090 jobs relating to the Criminal Justice field. The highest paying job in the field was that of a lawyer (14,960 employed in the state), making a mean annual wage of $105,520. Law clerks (1,460 employed in the state) were the lowest paid employees, making a mean annual wage of $35,740.

=== Issue 1 ===
Issue 1 was on the ballot in the November 2018 general election in Ohio, and it included reformed sentencing for drug offenses. If it had been passed by the voters of Ohio, drug offenders would have been charged with misdemeanors instead of felonies, and drug offenders on probation could not be sent to prison because of a violation of their probation that was non-criminal. If Issue 1 had been implemented, the state would have been required to utilize the money it saved from the decline of inmates on new programs that help rehabilitate offenders in a more productive manner.

Issue 1 was not passed by the voting citizens of Ohio. Polling results yielded an approval rate of 36.6% and a rejection rate of 63.4%.

== Capital punishment laws ==
Capital punishment is applied in Ohio.

== See also ==
- Law of Ohio
