= List of U.S. states and territories by incarceration and correctional supervision rate =

Incarceration rates by state. From various years; latest available as of June 2024. State, federal, and local inmates.

This article has lists of U.S. states and U.S. territories by incarceration and correctional supervision rates. There are also counts of inmates for various categories. The data is from the United States Department of Justice and other sources. The incarceration numbers include sentenced and unsentenced inmates from many categories.

== Incarceration rates and totals; numbers in state, federal, and local institutions ==
This table and the one that directly follows it are a comprehensive breakdown of inmates across many categories. The incarceration rate for a state or U.S. territory is calculated from the total of inmates across that location row in both tables. Nationwide totals for each column are at the end of each table.

Some U.S. territories are in alphabetical order in the 2 table halves: American Samoa, Northern Mariana Islands, and the U.S. Virgin Islands.

- Asterisk (*) indicates "Incarceration in LOCATION" or "Crime in LOCATION" links.

Incarceration rates per 100,000. Counts. Data is from various years. Latest data available as of June 2024.
Location	Incarceration rate	Total incarcerated	State population	State prisons	Federal	Local jails
Alabama *	898	45,573	5,073,903	26,421	3,607	14,727
Alaska *	744	5,456	733,276	4,778	498	12
American Samoa	606	301	49,710	301	N/A	N/A
Arizona *	710	52,329	7,365,684	33,865	3,567	13,541
Arkansas *	912	27,795	3,046,404	17,625	2,522	7,165
California *	494	192,694	39,040,616	97,608	12,172	75,061
Colorado *	556	32,495	5,841,039	17,168	1,811	12,719
Connecticut *	326	11,747	3,608,706	10,506	949	N/A
Delaware *	539	5,492	1,019,459	4,954	361	N/A
Florida *	705	156,734	22,245,521	84,678	13,370	55,826
Georgia *	881	96,171	10,913,150	48,439	6,897	40,085
Guam	502	772	153,836	678	94	N/A
Hawaii *	367	5,283	1,439,399	4,149	834	N/A
Idaho *	720	13,965	1,938,996	9,110	950	3,508
Illinois *	433	54,474	12,582,515	29,634	6,386	16,493
Indiana *	721	49,241	6,832,274	25,286	3,436	19,416
Iowa *	550	17,598	3,199,693	8,473	3,744	4,950
Kansas *	648	19,022	2,936,716	8,709	1,537	8,065
Kentucky *	889	40,107	4,511,563	19,744	3,182	16,844
Louisiana *	1,067	48,973	4,588,023	27,296	2,538	18,183
Maine	272	3,777	1,389,338	1,675	452	1,623
Maryland *	475	29,304	6,163,981	15,637	4,068	8,455
Massachusetts *	241	16,798	6,982,740	6,001	1,279	9,129
Michigan *	535	53,683	10,033,281	32,374	4,477	15,875
Minnesota *	323	18,457	5,714,300	8,636	2,003	6,343
Mississippi *	1,020	29,980	2,938,928	19,802	2,041	7,829
Missouri *	713	44,016	6,177,168	23,911	6,747	11,576
Montana *	758	8,508	1,122,878	4,691	1,214	2,206
Nebraska *	591	11,635	1,968,060	5,649	1,390	4,119
Nevada *	610	19,370	3,177,421	10,304	1,311	7,211
New Hampshire	278	3,886	1,399,003	2,086	426	1,332
New Jersey *	270	25,016	9,260,817	12,657	2,337	8,775
New Mexico *	647	13,676	2,113,476	4,970	1,746	6,549
New York *	317	62,339	19,673,200	31,148	8,859	20,448
North Carolina *	559	59,753	10,695,965	29,627	9,164	20,360
North Dakota *	560	4,363	778,912	1,817	901	1,434
Northern Mariana Islands	400	189	47,329	170	19	N/A
Ohio *	621	72,989	11,759,697	45,313	4,728	20,582
Oklahoma *	905	36,388	4,019,271	22,941	2,350	10,625
Oregon *	494	20,942	4,239,379	12,518	1,182	5,991
Pennsylvania *	589	76,355	12,972,091	37,910	5,726	31,303
Puerto Rico *	341	10,995	3,220,113	7,067	3,928	N/A
Rhode Island *	254	2,779	1,093,842	2,393	260	N/A
South Carolina *	606	32,038	5,282,955	16,318	3,712	11,177
South Dakota *	812	7,386	909,869	3,444	1,327	2,003
Tennessee *	817	57,625	7,048,976	23,735	7,044	26,463
Texas *	751	225,480	30,029,848	139,631	23,244	58,489
U.S. Virgin Islands	651	567	87,146	417	150	N/A
Utah *	396	13,381	3,381,236	6,009	1,313	5,765
Vermont *	245	1,583	647,110	1,360	219	N/A
Virginia *	679	58,917	8,679,099	27,162	4,722	25,229
Washington *	373	29,065	7,784,477	13,772	2,438	11,567
Washington, D.C. *	816	5,473	670,949	N/A	3,445	1,817
West Virginia *	674	11,954	1,774,035	5,873	1,289	4,372
Wisconsin *	615	36,199	5,890,543	20,873	1,615	12,741
Wyoming *	785	4,568	581,629	2,154	615	1,558
U.S. total	608	2,048,524	336,829,545	1,079,467	219,140	649,181

== Numbers in institution types: youth, Indian, civil commitment, forensic psychiatric, immigration, military ==
Further breakdown of inmates across categories. US totals at end of table.

- Asterisk (*) indicates "Incarceration in LOCATION" or "Crime in LOCATION" links.

U.S. states and territories. Number of inmates by category. Data is from various years. Latest data available as of June 2024.
Location	Youth	Indian Country jails	Civil commitment	Forensic psychiatric	Immigration	Military
Alabama *	678	N/A	N/A	140	N/A	N/A
Alaska *	156	2	N/A	10	N/A	N/A
American Samoa	N/A	N/A	N/A	N/A	N/A	N/A
Arizona *	351	774	88	143	N/A	N/A
Arkansas *	297	N/A	N/A	186	N/A	N/A
California *	2,385	N/A	946	4,522	N/A	N/A
Colorado *	462	45	N/A	290	N/A	N/A
Connecticut *	63	N/A	N/A	229	N/A	N/A
Delaware *	135	N/A	N/A	42	N/A	N/A
Florida *	1,221	N/A	531	1,108	N/A	N/A
Georgia *	750	N/A	N/A	N/A	N/A	N/A
Guam	N/A	N/A	N/A	N/A	N/A	N/A
Hawaii *	27	N/A	N/A	273	N/A	N/A
Idaho *	264	61	N/A	72	N/A	N/A
Illinois *	516	N/A	493	952	N/A	N/A
Indiana *	837	N/A	N/A	266	N/A	N/A
Iowa *	267	N/A	164	N/A	N/A	N/A
Kansas *	351	N/A	256	104	N/A	N/A
Kentucky *	297	N/A	N/A	40	N/A	N/A
Louisiana *	717	N/A	N/A	239	N/A	N/A
Maine	27	N/A	N/A	N/A	N/A	N/A
Maryland *	198	N/A	N/A	946	N/A	N/A
Massachusetts *	204	N/A	104	81	N/A	N/A
Michigan *	723	11	N/A	223	N/A	N/A
Minnesota *	378	81	740	276	N/A	N/A
Mississippi *	186	44	N/A	78	N/A	N/A
Missouri *	612	N/A	280	890	N/A	N/A
Montana *	99	244	N/A	54	N/A	N/A
Nebraska *	207	8	150	112	N/A	N/A
Nevada *	342	3	N/A	199	N/A	N/A
New Hampshire	12	N/A	0	30	N/A	N/A
New Jersey *	378	N/A	419	450	N/A	N/A
New Mexico *	198	125	N/A	88	N/A	N/A
New York *	741	N/A	386	757	N/A	N/A
North Carolina *	411	0	N/A	191	N/A	N/A
North Dakota *	39	137	27	8	N/A	N/A
Northern Mariana Islands	N/A	N/A	N/A	N/A	N/A	N/A
Ohio *	1,476	N/A	N/A	890	N/A	N/A
Oklahoma *	261	11	N/A	200	N/A	N/A
Oregon *	597	N/A	N/A	654	N/A	N/A
Pennsylvania *	1,002	N/A	55	359	N/A	N/A
Puerto Rico *	N/A	N/A	N/A	N/A	N/A	N/A
Rhode Island *	72	N/A	N/A	54	N/A	N/A
South Carolina *	414	N/A	204	213	N/A	N/A
South Dakota *	99	487	N/A	26	N/A	N/A
Tennessee *	300	N/A	N/A	83	N/A	N/A
Texas *	2,730	N/A	447	939	N/A	N/A
U.S. Virgin Islands	N/A	N/A	N/A	N/A	N/A	N/A
Utah *	168	N/A	N/A	126	N/A	N/A
Vermont *	0	N/A	N/A	4	N/A	N/A
Virginia *	558	N/A	406	840	N/A	N/A
Washington *	396	187	102	603	N/A	N/A
Washington, D.C. *	78	N/A	N/A	133	N/A	N/A
West Virginia *	345	N/A	N/A	75	N/A	N/A
Wisconsin *	417	44	187	322	N/A	N/A
Wyoming *	171	28	N/A	42	N/A	N/A
U.S. total	24,891	2,292	6,051	18,562	47,835	1,105

== By territory and percentage female ==
- Asterisk (*) indicates "Incarceration in TERRITORY" or "Crime in TERRITORY" links.

US territories. Incarceration rate per 100,000 of all ages. Incarceration count. Percent female. Data year is in order by column.

US territories. Incarceration rate per 100,000 of all ages. Incarceration count. Percent female. Data year is in order by column.
Territory	Rate	Count	Percent female	Data year
American Samoa	345	193	4.1%	2017, 2017, 2017
Guam	411	690	7.2%	2019, 2019, 2017
Northern Mariana Islands	313	175	5.8%	2019, 2019, 2007
Puerto Rico *	278	8,884	3.6%	2019, 2019, 2017
U.S. Virgin Islands	394	412	2.7%	2020, 2020, 2011

== Juvenile detention ==
Juvenile detention totals from the Office of Juvenile Justice and Delinquency Prevention.

Juvenile detention in the US
Year	Male	Female	Total
1997	90,771	14,284	105,055
1999	92,985	14,508	107,493
2001	89,115	15,104	104,219
2003	81,975	14,556	96,531
2006	78,998	13,723	92,721
2007	75,017	11,797	86,814
2010	61,359	9,434	70,793
2011	53,079	8,344	61,423
2013	46,421	7,727	54,148
2015	40,750	7,293	48,043
2017	36,982	6,598	43,580
2019	31,064	5,415	36,479
2021	21,340	3,554	24,894

== Comparison with other countries ==
The U.S. incarceration rate peaked in 2008. The U.S. rate was the highest in the world in 2008. Chart is for prisoners per 100,000 population of all ages.

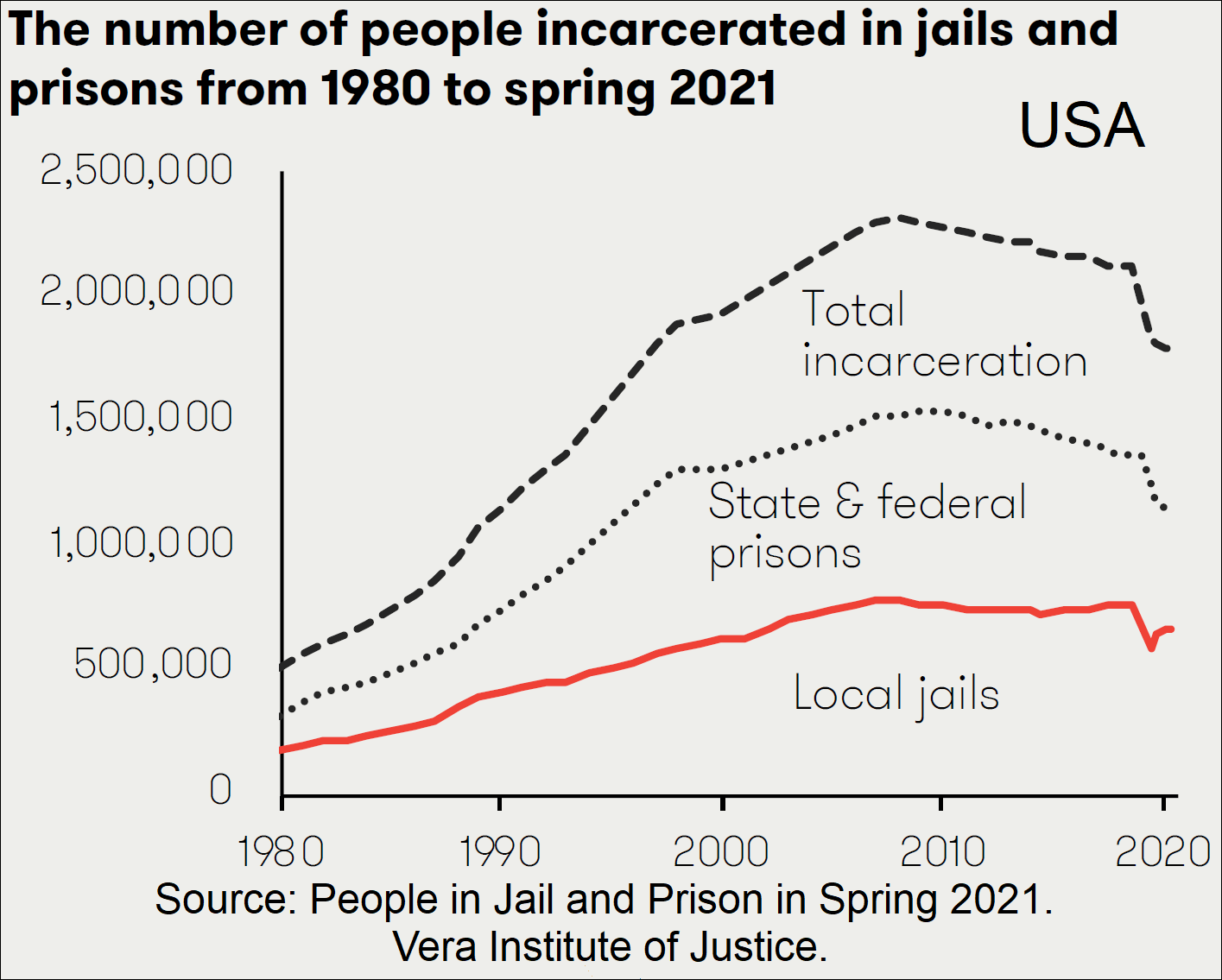
US timeline graphs of number of people incarcerated in jails and prisons.

On January 1, 2008, more than 1 in 100 adults in the United States were in prison or jail. Total U.S. incarceration peaked in 2008. The U.S. incarceration rate was the highest in the world in 2008. It is no longer the highest rate.

The United States has one of the highest rates of female incarceration. According to a November 2017 report by the World Prison Brief around 212,000 of the 714,000 female prisoners worldwide (women and girls) are incarcerated in the United States. In the United States in 2016, women made up 9.8% of the incarcerated population in adult prisons and jails.

Comparing English-speaking developed countries; the overall incarceration rate in the U.S. was 531 per 100,000 population of all ages in 2021, the incarceration rate of Canada was 85 per 100,000 in 2020, England and Wales was 146 per 100,000 in 2023, and Australia was 158 per 100,000 in 2022. Comparing other developed countries, the rate of Spain was 122 per 100,000 in 2020, France was 90 per 100,000 in 2020, Germany was 69 per 100,000 in 2020, Norway was 49 per 100,000 in 2020, Netherlands was 63 per 100,000 in 2018, and Japan was 38 per 100,000 in 2019.

The racial aspect of mass incarceration in the United States is striking. According to Michelle Alexander (in 2010 book), the United States "imprisons a larger percentage of its black population than South Africa did at the height of apartheid."

== Correctional supervision by state ==
Chart below has numbers for people in adult facilities, and for people on probation and on parole. The incarceration numbers for the states in the chart below are for sentenced and unsentenced inmates in adult facilities in local jails and state prisons. Numbers for federal prisons are in the Federal line.

Asterisk (*) indicates "Incarceration in STATE" or "Crime in STATE" links.

Correctional supervision numbers for Dec 31, 2018. "In community" is community supervision. Rates are per 100,000 adults.

Correctional supervision numbers for Dec 31, 2018. "In community" is community supervision. Rates are per 100,000 adults
Jurisdiction	Total		In community		Incarcerated	
Jurisdiction	Counts	Rate	Probation or Parole	Rate	In prison or jail	Rate
Federal	302,100	90	122,800	40	179,200	50
State	6,083,300	1,850	4,276,200	1,300	1,919,200	580
Alabama *	99,200	2,030	60,900	1,240	40,400	820
Alaska *	7,800	1,060	3,400	460	4,400	600
Arizona *	136,800	1,890	84,300	1,170	54,600	750
Arkansas *	74,700	2,470	53,800	1,780	24,700	820
California *	513,100	1,290	312,400	790	200,700	510
Colorado *	122,600	2,140	91,300	1,590	32,700	570
Connecticut *	54,800	1,530	43,100	1,210	13,700	380
Delaware *	20,600	2,120	14,500	1,490	6,100	620
District of Columbia *	9,500	1,340	8,600	1,210	1,800	260
Florida *	357,400	1,670	209,400	980	150,500	700
Georgia *	495,200	4,680	433,200	4,100	89,700	850
Hawaii *	27,200	1,920	21,900	1,540	5,400	380
Idaho *	51,800	2,920	39,700	2,240	12,100	690
Illinois *	171,900	1,350	116,100	910	55,800	440
Indiana *	164,700	2,450	118,400	1,760	46,300	690
Iowa *	47,600	1,500	35,600	1,120	14,000	440
Kansas *	39,000	1,340	21,900	750	18,000	620
Kentucky *	99,600	2,230	62,800	1,400	37,500	840
Louisiana *	104,000	2,230	62,300	1,340	45,700	980
Maine	10,300	770	6,800	500	4,000	300
Maryland *	96,600	1,600	80,600	1,330	27,600	460
Massachusetts *	71,200	1,030	53,700	780	17,600	250
Michigan *	219,200	2,190	164,800	1,650	54,500	540
Minnesota *	122,900	2,180	107,500	1,910	15,900	280
Mississippi *	63,600	2,130	37,200	1,240	27,500	920
Missouri *	106,100	1,730	63,100	1,030	43,000	700
Montana *	16,700	1,570	11,400	1,070	6,200	580
Nebraska *	25,100	1,300	15,900	820	9,300	480
Nevada *	40,300	1,310	19,800	640	20,500	670
New Hampshire	10,400	760	6,300	460	4,100	300
New Jersey *	173,700	1,950	146,300	1,640	28,700	320
New Mexico *	26,800	1,280	13,700	660	13,100	620
New York *	202,300	1,040	139,700	720	67,700	350
North Carolina *	148,600	1,420	94,100	900	54,600	520
North Dakota *	10,100	1,320	7,000	920	3,100	400
Ohio *	322,500	2,760	253,900	2,170	70,500	600
Oklahoma *	81,800	2,070	43,300	1,100	38,500	970
Oregon *	81,000	1,920	59,900	1,420	21,100	500
Pennsylvania *	360,200	2,810	288,000	2,250	77,900	610
Rhode Island *	22,000	2,080	20,900	1,980	2,800	260
South Carolina *	67,000	1,310	36,700	720	30,300	590
South Dakota *	15,100	1,710	9,200	1,040	6,100	680
Tennessee *	117,400	1,730	72,100	1,060	49,300	730
Texas *	672,400	2,330	474,600	1,640	218,000	750
Utah *	26,800	840	16,600	520	12,500	390
Vermont *	6,500	1,030	4,800	770	1,700	260
Virginia *	122,000	1,430	65,000	760	57,100	670
Washington *	115,200	1,520	88,900	1,170	30,900	410
West Virginia *	21,500	1,190	10,900	600	10,600	590
Wisconsin *	100,600	1,730	63,900	1,100	36,700	630
Wyoming *	9,900	1,720	6,300	1,090	4,000	700

== Male and female incarceration and correctional supervision ==
In 2015 there were 1,942,500 male and 202,600 female inmates in prisons and jails. That is 10.4% female.

- Note: The state, federal, and U.S. total rows sort, but they come back to the top after further sorting.
- Asterisk (*) indicates "Incarceration in STATE" or "Crime in STATE" links.

2015 male and female incarceration and correctional supervision numbers. Rate is per 100,000 of all ages.

2015 male and female incarceration and correctional supervision numbers. Rate is per 100,000 of all ages.
Jurisdiction	Parole, probation, etc.					Incarcerated				
Jurisdiction	Number			Rate		Number			Rate	
Jurisdiction	Total	Male	Female	Male	Female	Total	Male	Female	Male	Female
State	4,518,100	3,485,100	1,033,000	2,190	630	1,949,400	1,759,700	189,800	1,450	150
Federal	132,800	109,200	23,700	70	10	195,700	182,800	12,900	150	10
U.S. total	4,650,900	3,594,300	1,056,700	2,260	640	2,145,100	1,942,500	202,600	1,600	160
Alabama *	64,600	50,600	14,000	2,140	560	42,900	38,600	4,300	1,640	170
Alaska *	8,500	6,600	1,900	1,700	550	5,400	4,800	600	1,230	170
Arizona *	83,300	66,700	16,700	1,950	480	54,900	49,100	5,800	1,440	170
Arkansas *	51,500	39,000	12,500	2,660	820	24,000	21,200	2,800	1,450	180
California *	349,600	277,500	72,100	1,420	360	201,000	186,000	15,100	950	80
Colorado *	89,200	66,700	22,400	2,410	820	31,800	28,000	3,800	1,010	140
Connecticut *	45,300	35,700	9,500	2,040	520	15,800	14,700	1,100	840	60
Delaware *	16,100	12,400	3,700	2,690	760	6,700	6,100	500	1,330	110
District of Columbia *	9,900	8,500	1,400	2,640	400	1,800	1,700	100	530	30
Florida *	225,400	167,000	58,400	1,670	560	153,000	137,900	15,100	1,380	140
Georgia *	451,800	353,600	98,200	7,060	1,870	88,500	79,600	8,900	1,590	170
Hawaii *	22,500	17,200	5,300	2,360	740	5,900	5,200	700	710	100
Idaho *	37,800	28,100	9,700	3,370	1,160	10,900	9,300	1,600	1,120	190
Illinois *	151,300	118,200	33,100	1,870	510	63,900	59,500	4,400	940	70
Indiana *	122,500	93,100	29,400	2,850	870	43,500	38,200	5,200	1,170	160
Iowa *	35,600	26,900	8,700	1,730	550	12,900	11,500	1,400	740	90
Kansas *	20,900	16,400	4,500	1,120	310	16,600	14,800	1,800	1,010	130
Kentucky *	70,600	49,400	21,300	2,260	940	33,800	28,700	5,100	1,310	230
Louisiana *	71,900	57,400	14,500	2,510	600	49,000	45,400	3,600	1,980	150
Maine	6,700	5,400	1,400	820	200	4,000	3,500	500	540	70
Maryland *	87,400	71,800	15,600	2,460	500	29,700	27,800	1,900	950	60
Massachusetts *	66,900	52,600	14,300	1,590	410	20,100	19,000	1,200	570	30
Michigan *	193,900	147,700	46,100	3,020	910	57,700	53,100	4,600	1,090	90
Minnesota *	105,100	81,000	24,000	2,960	870	16,500	14,800	1,600	540	60
Mississippi *	44,800	35,500	9,300	2,440	600	28,000	25,800	2,300	1,770	150
Missouri *	62,600	47,600	15,000	1,590	480	43,400	38,500	4,900	1,290	160
Montana *	9,700	7,400	2,300	1,430	440	5,600	4,800	800	930	150
Nebraska *	13,700	10,000	3,700	1,050	390	8,600	7,700	900	810	100
Nevada *	19,200	15,200	4,000	1,040	270	19,100	16,800	2,300	1,150	160
New Hampshire	6,300	4,900	1,400	750	210	4,600	4,100	500	620	80
New Jersey *	151,300	117,700	33,700	2,690	730	33,900	31,700	2,200	720	50
New Mexico *	16,800	12,600	4,200	1,210	400	15,100	13,300	1,800	1,290	170
New York *	145,600	120,500	25,000	1,250	250	75,900	71,100	4,800	740	50
North Carolina *	97,400	73,400	24,000	1,490	460	53,800	48,800	5,000	990	100
North Dakota *	6,900	5,100	1,800	1,300	490	3,200	2,700	400	690	120
Ohio *	262,000	189,700	72,300	3,330	1,220	70,700	62,800	7,900	1,100	130
Oklahoma *	33,400	25,700	7,700	1,320	390	39,700	34,400	5,300	1,770	270
Oregon *	61,900	49,600	12,300	2,470	600	21,000	18,600	2,400	930	120
Pennsylvania *	296,200	223,500	72,700	3,560	1,110	83,900	76,300	7,600	1,220	120
Rhode Island *	24,400	20,600	3,800	4,010	690	3,200	3,100	100	600	30
South Carolina *	38,500	30,500	8,000	1,280	320	31,600	28,900	2,800	1,210	110
South Dakota *	9,800	7,500	2,300	1,720	540	5,300	4,600	800	1,050	180
Tennessee *	75,400	57,100	18,300	1,770	540	48,000	41,600	6,500	1,290	190
Texas *	488,800	375,200	113,600	2,730	810	214,800	192,500	22,300	1,400	160
Utah *	15,700	12,000	3,700	790	240	11,700	10,100	1,600	660	110
Vermont *	6,300	4,800	1,500	1,550	470	1,800	1,600	200	520	50
Virginia *	57,000	43,700	13,300	1,060	310	57,300	51,000	6,300	1,230	150
Washington *	104,700	81,600	23,200	2,260	640	29,700	26,300	3,400	730	90
West Virginia *	10,100	7,300	2,800	800	300	10,100	8,700	1,400	950	150
Wisconsin *	65,600	52,700	12,900	1,830	440	35,000	31,800	3,100	1,110	110
Wyoming *	5,900	4,300	1,600	1,450	550	3,900	3,400	600	1,130	200

== U.S. states compared to countries ==
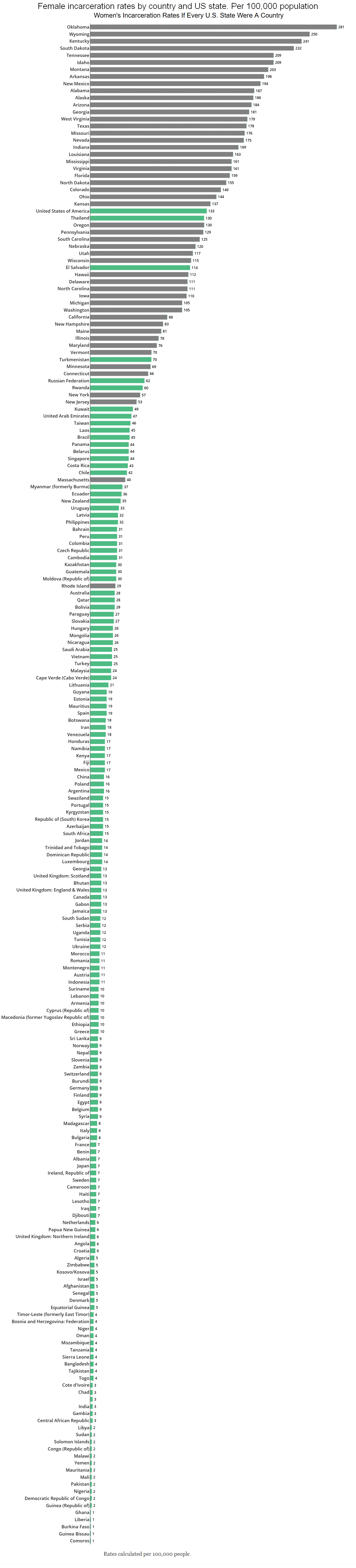
Female incarceration rates by country and U.S. state.

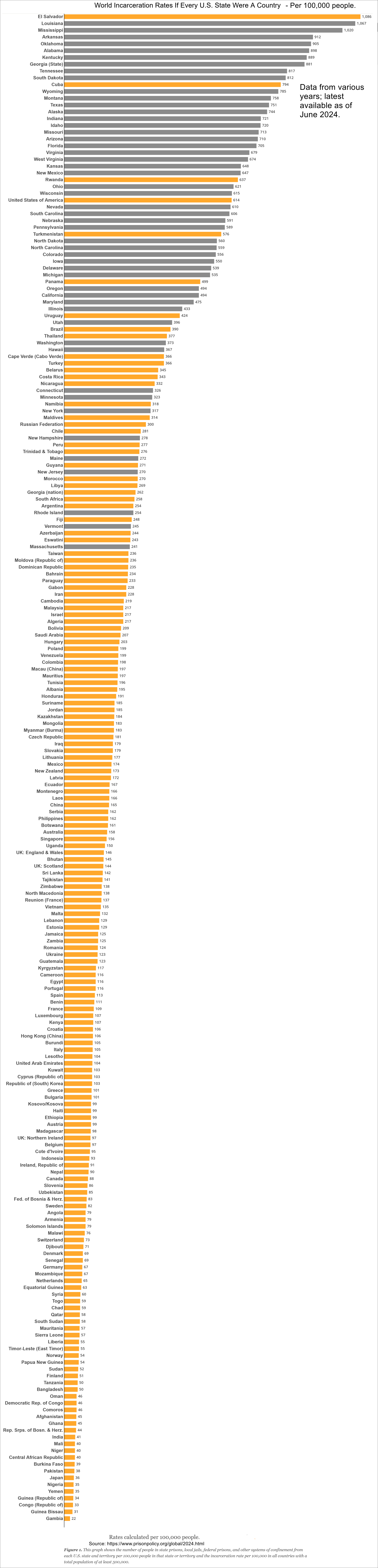
World incarceration rates by country and U.S. state.

See first chart to right. The data is from various years, and is the latest available as of June 2024. From the source report: "This graph shows the number of people in state prisons, local jails, federal prisons, and other systems of confinement from each U.S. state and territory per 100,000 people in that state or territory and the incarceration rate per 100,000 in all countries with a total population of at least 500,000."

== Female incarceration in U.S. states and countries ==
See second chart at right. Female incarceration rates by country and U.S. state. Per 100,000 female population of all ages. Incarcerated females of all ages (where the data are available). From a 2018 report with latest available data. From the source report: "This graph shows the number of women in state prisons, local jails, and federal prisons from each U.S. state per 100,000 people in that state and the incarceration rate per 100,000 in all countries with at least a half million in total population."

== See also ==
- United States incarceration rate
- Incarceration in the United States
- Incarceration of women in the United States
- Racial and ethnic demographics of the United States
- Race and the war on drugs
- Youth incarceration in the United States
- School-to-prison pipeline
- List of U.S. states by homicide rate
