= Gun death and violence in the United States by state =

Gun-related suicides and homicides in the United States, 1999-2024.

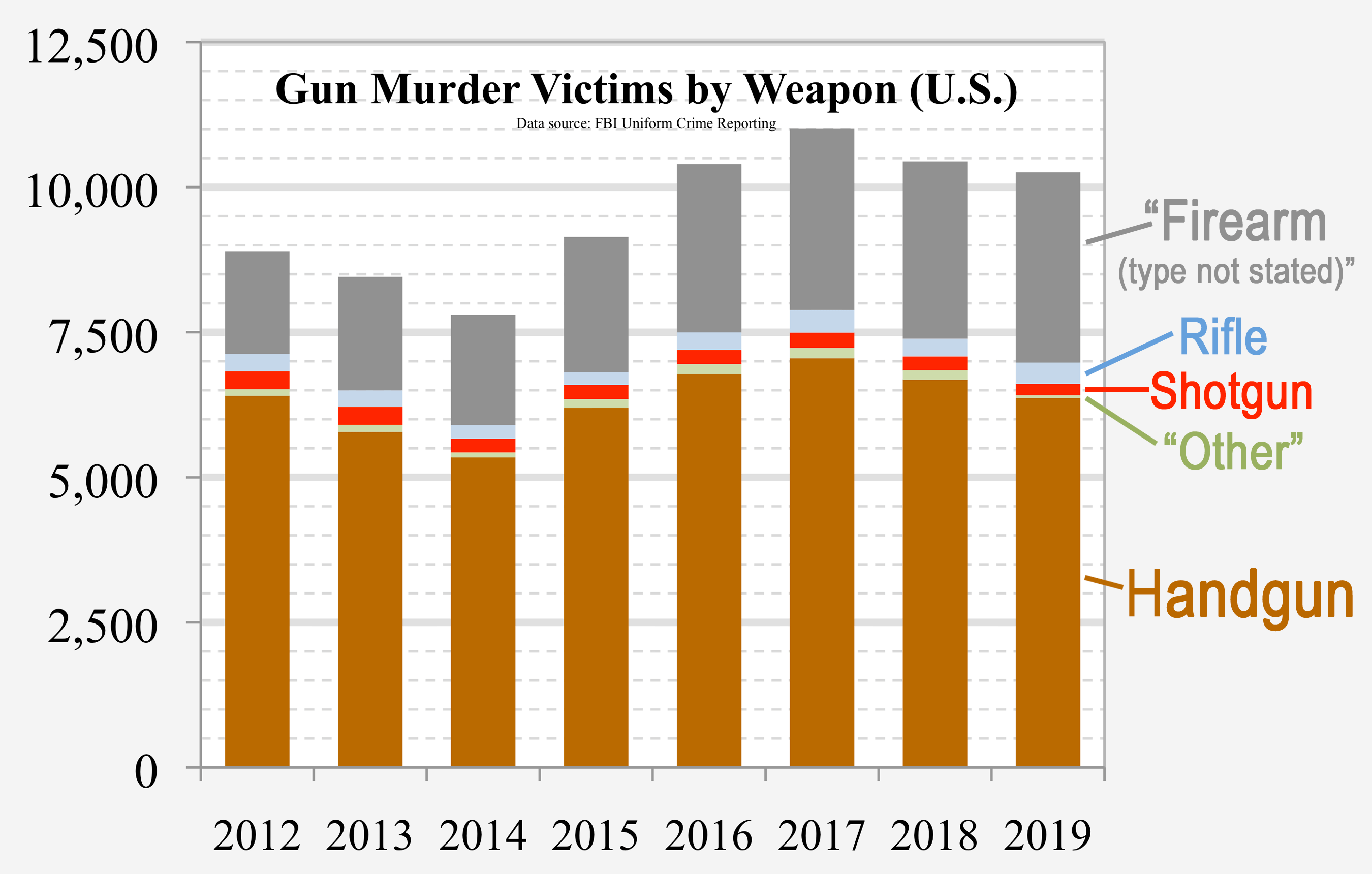
Handguns are involved in most U.S. gun homicides.

Annual gun-related death rates are positively correlated with household gun ownership rates.

A 2023 study concluded that more restrictive state gun policies reduced homicide and suicide gun deaths.

This is a list of US states by gun deaths and rates of violence. In 2021, there were 26,000 gun suicides and 21,000 gun homicides, together making up a sixth of deaths from external causes. Gun deaths make up about half of all suicides, and over 80% of homicides.

In 2021, gun deaths rose to levels not seen since the 1990s, but remained below rates of the 1970s.

A 2022 study found that guns were the cause of more years lost than any other source of traumatic injury, including motor vehicles.

== 2024 overall gun death rates and counts ==
The statistics are from 2024 CDC data.

2024 overall gun death rates (per 100,000 population) and counts
Location	Death rates	Deaths
Mississippi	28.0	810
New Mexico	26.6	563
Alaska	24.4	182
Alabama	23.7	1212
Wyoming	23.4	143
Louisiana	22.9	1031
Arkansas	20.6	638
Montana	20.2	247
Tennessee	19.8	1448
District of Columbia	19.7	148
Missouri	19.6	1234
South Carolina	19.5	1064
Oklahoma	19.1	794
Kentucky	18.5	870
Georgia	17.6	1985
South Dakota	17.3	159
Indiana	17.2	1196
Nevada	17.2	582
Arizona	16.9	1331
North Carolina	16.3	1835
Idaho	15.9	331
Colorado	15.3	961
West Virginia	15.3	281
Kansas	15.2	446
Ohio	14.6	1745
Oregon	14.2	663
Texas	13.9	4389
Utah	13.3	454
Virginia	12.8	1153
Florida	12.7	3191
Illinois	12.4	1563
North Dakota	12.2	95
Wisconsin	12.1	735
Maine	11.9	181
Michigan	11.9	1228
Pennsylvania	11.9	1624
Delaware	11.8	123
Iowa	11.8	389
Maryland	11.6	716
Washington	11.0	915
Nebraska	10.9	218
Vermont	10.6	76
New Hampshire	10.2	152
Minnesota	9.8	582
California	7.0	2853
Connecticut	5.8	224
Rhode Island	4.6	55
New York	4.4	896
New Jersey	4	393
Massachusetts	3.8	287
Hawaii	3.7	56

== 2021 gun death rates for suicide and homicide ==
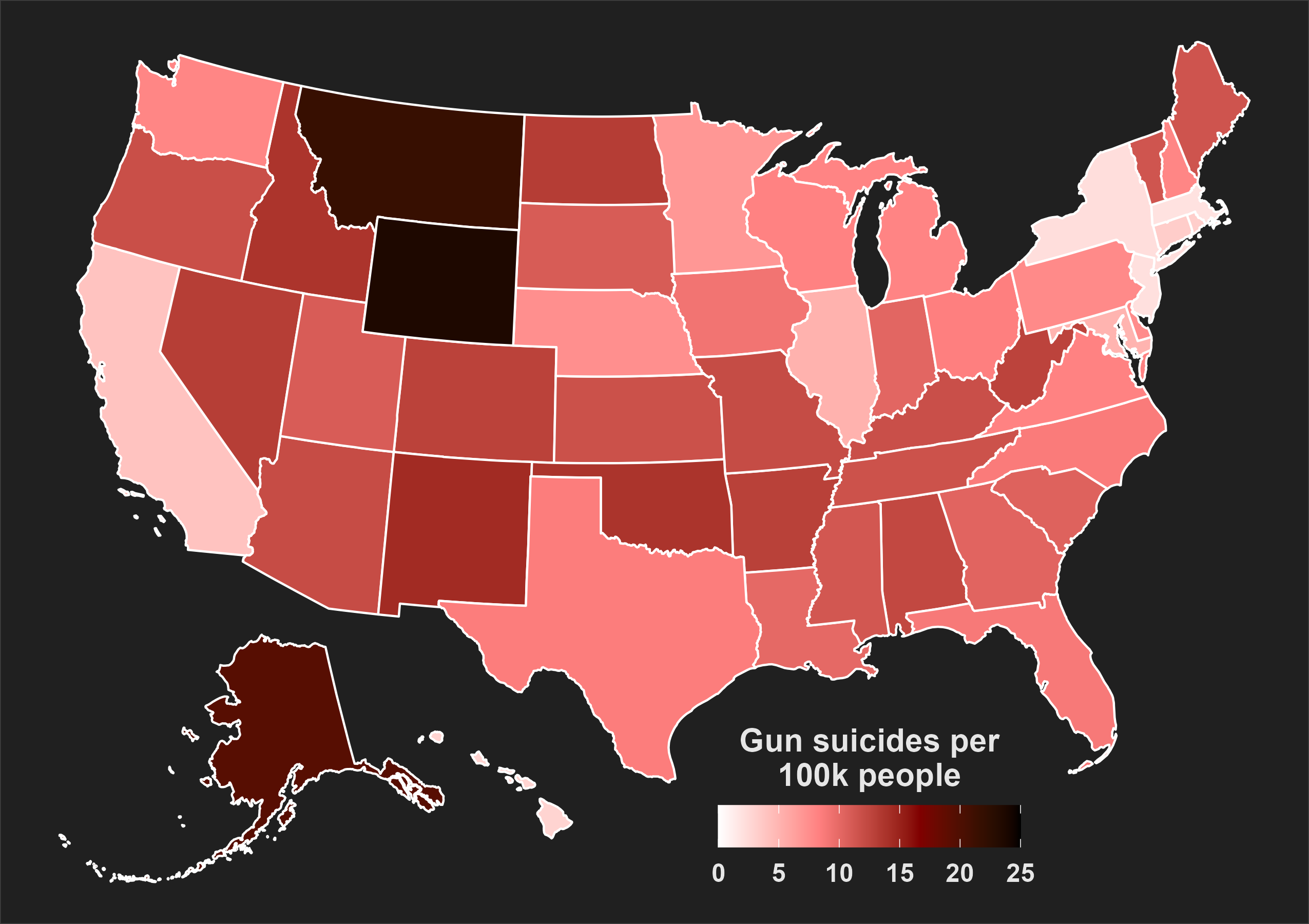
Gun suicide rate by state, 2021.

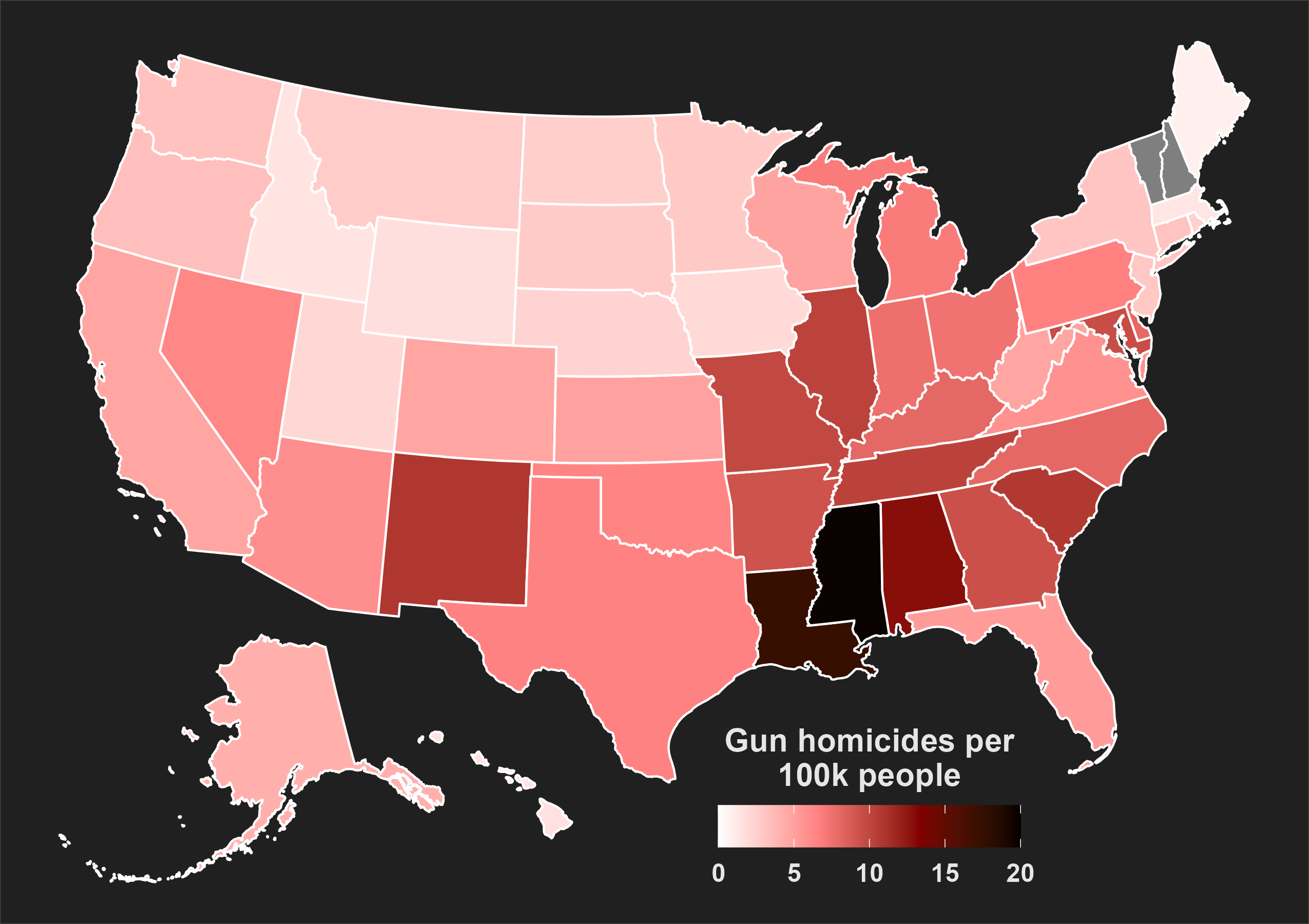
Gun homicide rate by state, 2021.

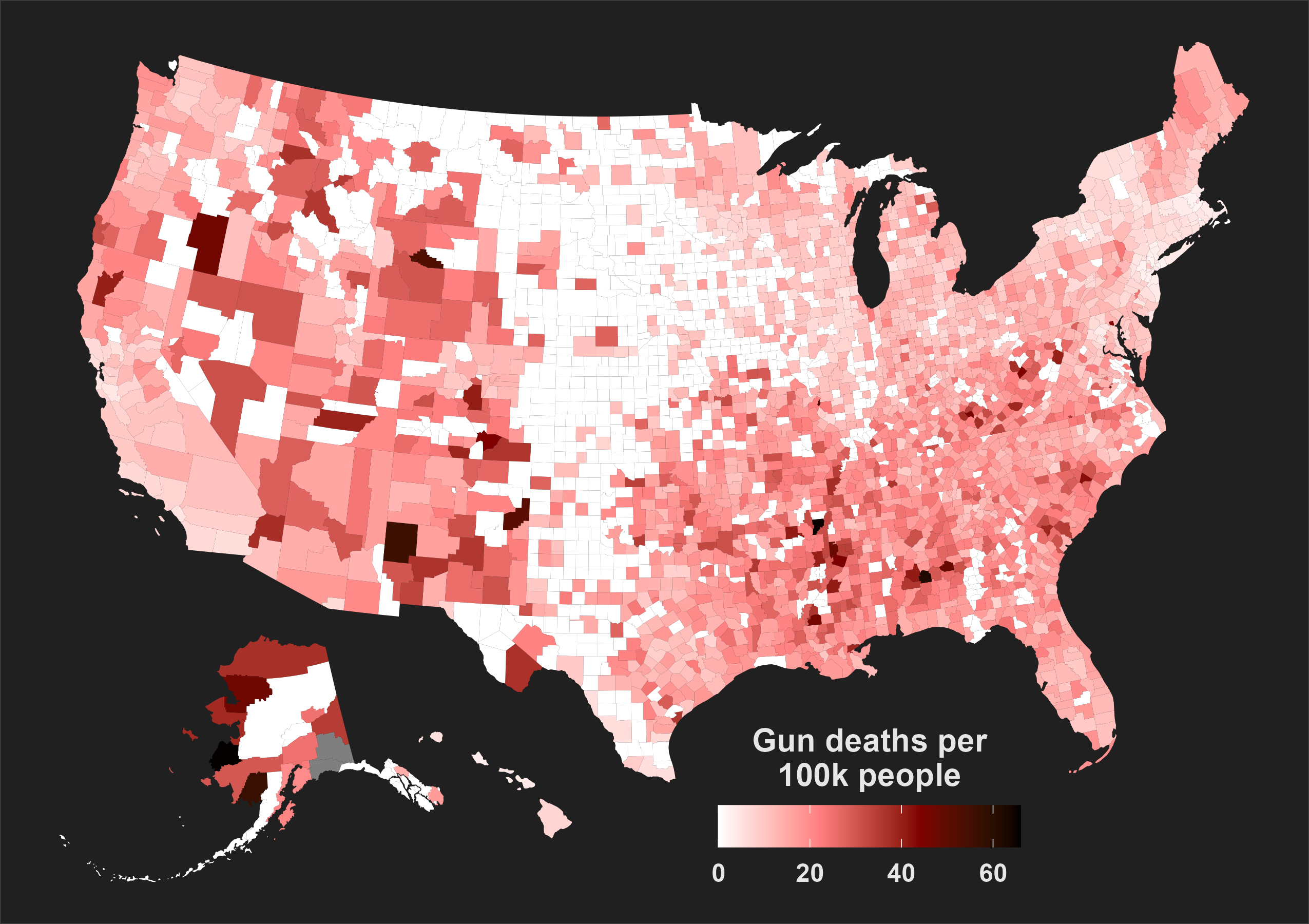
Gun death rate by county, 2023.

Percent of households with guns in 2016. RAND Corporation.

The statistics are from 2021 CDC data. Rates are per 100,000 inhabitants. The percent of households with guns by US state is from the RAND Corporation, and is for 2016.

2021 gun death rates for suicide and homicide. And overall rates for each.
Location	Gun suicide rate	Suicide rate	Gun homicide rate	Homicide rate	% gun at home
United States	7.9	14.5	6.3	7.8	(Note: No data from RAND source. Gallup reports about 40% of adults in the US live with a gun.)
Wyoming	23.7	32.8	1.7	2.8	61%
Montana	21.6	31.7	2.7	4.2	65%
Alaska	19.4	30.0	4.2	6.7	57%
New Mexico	14.4	25.2	10.9	14.5	36%
Oklahoma	13.8	22.0	6.4	8.6	55%
Idaho	13.8	20.4	1.5	2.2	58%
North Dakota	13.2	20.1	2.6	3.1	53%
Nevada	13.1	22.0	6.3	8.4	33%
Arkansas	12.9	20.4	9.3	11.1	52%
Colorado	12.8	23.8	4.7	6.3	38%
West Virginia	12.7	21.0	4.8	6.4	60%
Alabama	12.4	16.4	12.9	14.8	53%
Missouri	12.1	19.1	9.9	11.6	53%
Arizona	12.1	20.3	5.9	7.7	36%
Oregon	11.9	20.9	3.4	4.8	41%
Kentucky	11.8	18.1	8.1	9.0	53%
Kansas	11.8	19.1	4.9	6.1	42%
Tennessee	11.7	17.5	10.2	11.6	47%
Maine	11.5	20.2	0.9	1.5	48%
Vermont	11.5	22.0	(Note: Vermont had between 1 and 9 gun murders in 2021, so the specific figure is suppressed. If it had 5 gun murders, its gun murder rate would be 0.8 per 100 thousand.)	1.5	50%
Mississippi	11.3	16.3	19.8	22.2	54%
South Dakota	10.9	22.7	2.8	5.0	55%
Utah	10.9	19.3	2.1	2.7	40%
South Carolina	10.5	15.5	10.7	12.6	45%
Georgia	10.3	15.5	9.5	11.2	38%
Indiana	10.2	16.6	7.6	9.2	42%
Louisiana	10.0	14.9	17.4	20.4	52%
Iowa	9.2	17.2	2.0	2.9	39%
Florida	8.9	15.4	5.3	6.7	29%
North Carolina	8.7	13.7	8.1	9.4	37%
Texas	8.6	14.2	6.6	8.1	36%
Ohio	8.4	15.0	7.4	8.7	42%
Wisconsin	8.2	15.3	4.9	5.9	47%
Virginia	8.2	13.7	5.8	7.0	35%
Michigan	8.1	14.8	7.0	8.2	39%
New Hampshire	8.0	16.1	(Note: New Hampshire had between 1 and 9 gun murders in 2021, so the specific figure is suppressed. If it had 5 gun murders, its gun murder rate would be 0.4 per 100 thousand.)	1.1	46%
Washington	8.0	15.9	3.3	4.5	32%
Pennsylvania	7.7	14.5	6.6	8.5	40%
Delaware	7.6	13.7	8.0	10.3	39%
Nebraska	7.4	14.7	2.3	3.6	39%
Minnesota	6.9	14.2	2.9	4.1	39%
Illinois	5.2	11.5	10.2	11.7	23%
Maryland	5.0	10.1	9.6	11.5	17%
California	4.0	10.6	4.7	6.4	16%
Connecticut	3.4	11.1	3.2	4.4	19%
Rhode Island	3.3	10.7	2.5	3.7	14%
Hawaii	2.9	14.0	1.6	2.7	9%
New York	2.2	8.4	3.1	4.6	14%
New Jersey	2.1	7.4	3.0	4.4	9%
Massachusetts	1.9	8.6	1.4	2.3	9%
District of Columbia	1.8	6.9	25.2	33.3	(Note: No data available.)

== 2021 gun death count totals, and by category ==
The statistics are from 2021 CDC data.

Missing values indicate between 1 and 9 deaths for the year, so the specific figure is suppressed.

2021 gun death totals by intent
State	Gun deaths	Suicide	Homicide	Accident	Law
United States	48,830	26,328	20,958	549	537
Texas	4,613	2,528	1,942	53	38
California	3,576	1,575	1,861	32	89
Florida	3,142	1,928	1,150	18	25
Georgia	2,200	1,115	1,021	25	22
Illinois	1,995	656	1,292	15	18
Ohio	1,911	991	872	21	12
Pennsylvania	1,905	997	861	25	13
North Carolina	1,839	916	850	46	15
Tennessee	1,569	814	714	11	
Michigan	1,544	810	701		
Missouri	1,414	747	609	24	15
Arizona	1,365	879	430		26
Alabama	1,315	623	650	19	11
Louisiana	1,314	463	804	27	
Indiana	1,251	695	517	15	10
Virginia	1,248	709	505	12	
South Carolina	1,136	546	558	21	
New York	1,078	439	613		15
Colorado	1,064	745	276		29
Mississippi	962	333	583	21	
Kentucky	947	534	364	25	
Maryland	915	310	592	0	
Washington	896	617	254		
Oklahoma	836	551	257	11	
Wisconsin	793	484	290		
Arkansas	698	391	281	11	
Oregon	670	505	146		12
Nevada	633	413	199		
New Mexico	578	305	230		26
Minnesota	573	393	164		10
Kansas	503	345	145	10	
New Jersey	475	195	276	0	
Utah	450	364	70		
Iowa	364	293	64		
West Virginia	319	227	86		
Idaho	309	262	28		11
Montana	280	239	30		
Connecticut	248	122	116		
Massachusetts	247	136	99	0	
Nebraska	200	145	46		
District of Columbia	185	12	169	0	
Alaska	182	142	31		
Maine	178	158	12		
Delaware	158	76	80	0	
Wyoming	155	137	10		
North Dakota	128	102	20		0
South Dakota	128	98	25	0	
New Hampshire	123	111			
Vermont	83	74		0	
Hawaii	71	42	23		
Rhode Island	64	36	27	0	

== See also ==
- Gun violence in the United States
- Gun politics in the United States
  - Gun laws in the United States by state
  - Right to keep and bear arms in the United States
- Suicide in the United States
- Crime in the United States
  - List of U.S. states and territories by intentional homicide rate
  - List of U.S. states and territories by violent crime rate
  - List of United States cities by crime rate
- Index of gun politics articles
  - List of cities by murder rate
  - Number of guns per capita by country
  - Percent of households with guns by country
  - List of countries by firearm-related death rate
