= Crime in New York =

Crime in New York may refer to:

- Crime in New York (state)
- Crime in New York City
