= Incarceration in Oklahoma =

Incarceration in Oklahoma is how inmates are rehabilitated and reformed. Incarceration in Oklahoma includes state prisons and county and city jails. Oklahoma has the second highest state incarceration rate in the United States. Oklahoma is the second in women's incarceration in the United States. After becoming a state in 1907, the first prisons were opened and reform began.

== History ==
=== Early statehood ===
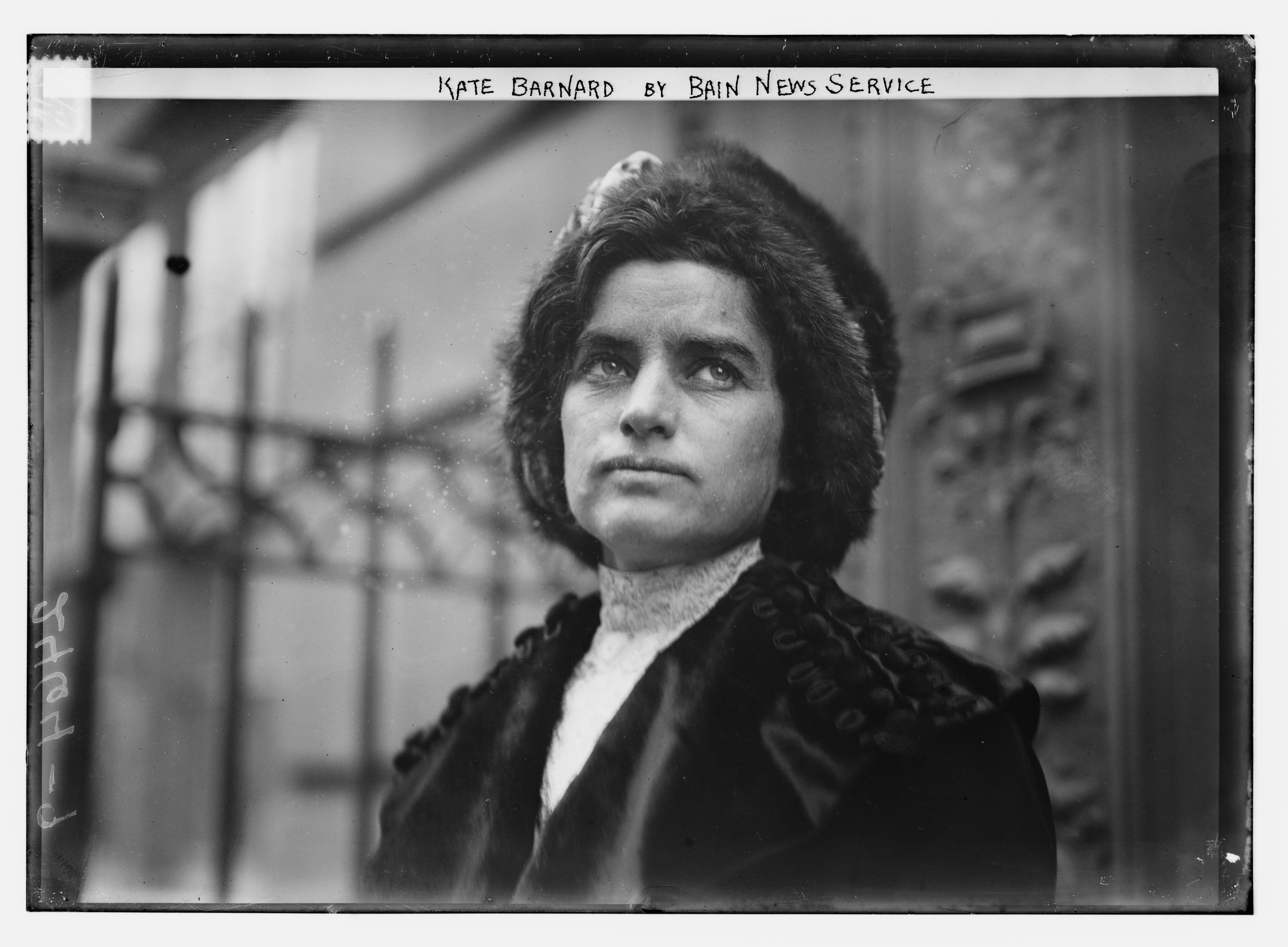
Kate Barnard

Before Oklahoma became a state, there were no prisons. Prisoners were sent to Lansing, Kansas to the Kansas Penitentiary. Oklahoma Commissioner of Charities and Corrections Kate Barnard had heard about the horrible treatment of Oklahoma prisoners at the Kansas Penitentiary. After hearing of the mistreatment, Barnard traveled to Kansas to investigate the conditions. Barnard discovered that inmates were being tortured. She returned to Oklahoma and wanted all Oklahoma prisoners returned. Kansas did not want to send back the prisoners since they were making a profit off of each prisoner. In October 1908, 50 inmates were brought back to Oklahoma. They were housed in a federal facility since the Oklahoma State Penitentiary was not yet completed.

Barnard, in 1907, was elected as Commissioner of Charities and Corrections. Barnard helped create what is now known as the Oklahoma Department of Corrections. She helped better the living conditions of inmates, mental health treatments, and condition of juvenile inmates. She was the second women to hold a state elected office in the US, and the first to do so in Oklahoma. She held the position until 1915.

=== McAlester Prison riot ===
The McAlester Prison riot took place July 1973. When built the prison was built 1911, its occupancy was set at 1,100 inmates. By 1973 the number of inmates was double the occupancy. The prison riot began on July 27. The prisoner took around twenty-one prison officials hostage. The hostages were released on July 28. On August 4, the inmates lost control of the prison. Three inmates died over the course of the riot. Over $20 million worth of damages was done to the prison. Many of the policy changes were not fulfilled leading to another prison riot in 1985.

=== 21st century ===
In 2018, there were 24 state prisons with 27,709 inmates, 1,780 inmates on parole, and 41,562 people were on probation. There are 93 jails in Oklahoma, as of 2018.

== Incarceration rates ==
Oklahoma prison population

Oklahoma has one of the highest incarceration rates when compared to other NATO countries. A 2018 study found that Oklahoma's incarceration rate per 100,000 citizens was 1,079. The national average for the United States was 698, and countries like Italy, Belgium, Norway, Netherlands, Denmark, and Iceland all had rates below 100 inmates per 100,000. From the 2010 census, it found that while 69 percent of Oklahoma's population is white, but they only make up for 44 percent of inmate population. Black and Latino populations make up 9 percent of the state population each, and they make up 26 percent and 15 percent of the inmate population.

In 2017, a 217 percent increase in black incarceration rates happened since 1978. The incarceration rates for black people in Oklahoma is 3,271 per 100,000 which is 3.9 times higher than for white people which comes in at 832 per 100,000. Native Americans have a 1.5 times higher rate than white people at 1,286.

In 2020, 3,119 prisoners are serving life sentences which makes up 12.3 percent of the prison population and 936, 3.7 percent of prison population, were sentences of life without the possibility of parole. Compared to the percentage of inmates in federal prison with life sentences 2.9% and life without parole 2.2% of federal prison populations. Oklahoma's numbers are extremely high.

=== Women's incarceration ===
The incarceration rate of women in Oklahoma, 130, is close to double the national average, 67. In Oklahoma, many women are charged with more serious crimes than what they committed. A woman may have committed a misdemeanor assault, but she is charged with a felony. In 2019, 73% of men incarcerated were in for property or drug crimes, whereas, 85% of the incarcerated women committed these crimes.

== State prisons ==
List of state prisons in Oklahoma:

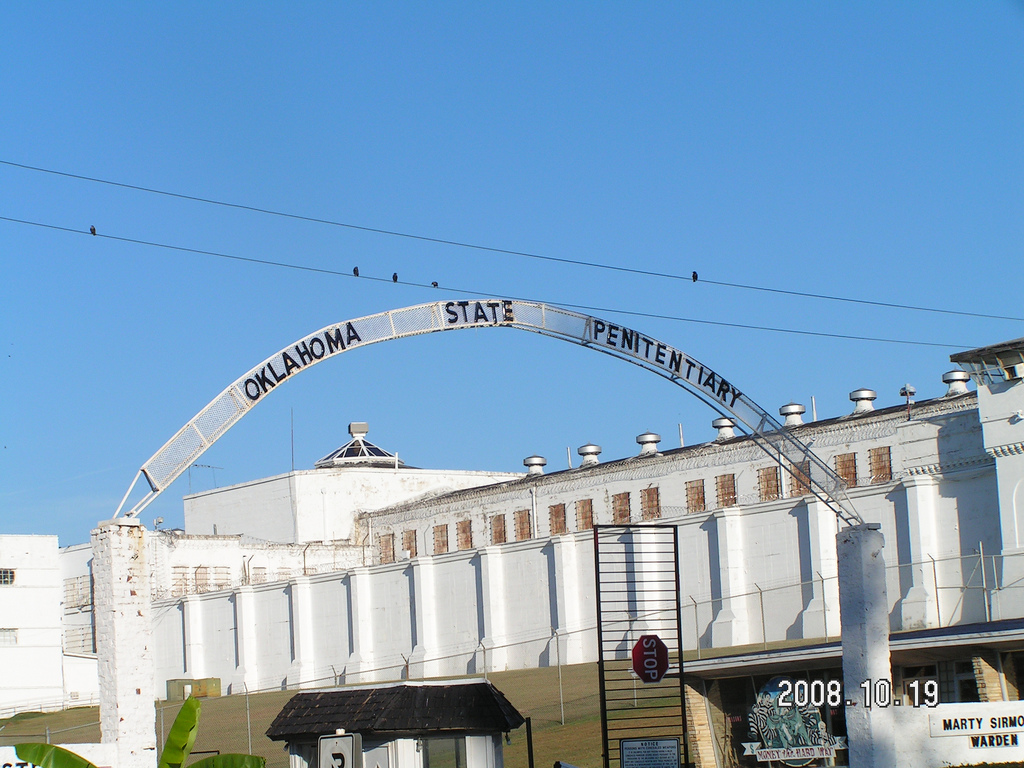
Oklahoma State Penitentiary in 2008

Maximum

- Oklahoma State Penitentiary (1908)

Medium

- Dick Conner Correctional Center (1979)
- James Crabtree Correctional Center (1982)
- Joseph Harp Correctional Center (1978)
- Lexington Assessment and Reception Center (1978)
- Mack Alford Correctional Center (1973)
- Mabel Bassett Correctional Center (1988)
- North Fork Correctional Center (2016)
- Oklahoma State Reformatory (1909)

Minimum

- Charles E. "Bill" Johnson Correctional Center (1995)
- Dr. Eddie Warrior Correctional Center (1988)
- Howard McLeod Correctional Center (1961)
- Jackie Brannon Correctional Center (1985)
- Jess Dunn Correctional Center (1980)
- Jim E. Hamilton Correctional Center (1969)
- John H. Lilley Correctional Center (1983)
- William S. Key Correctional Center (1988)
