= Crime in Florida =

Crime in Florida refers to crime occurring within the U.S. State of Florida.

== Crime Statistics ==
Florida
- Crime rates* (2019)

Violent crimes
- Homicide: 5.2
- Rape: 39.4
- Robbery: 75.5
- Aggravated assault: 258.3
- Total violent crime: 378.4

Property crimes
- Burglary: 295.2
- Larceny-theft: 1668.7
- Motor vehicle theft: 181.8
- Total property crime: 2145.7
- Notes *Number of reported crimes per 100,000 population. Source: FBI Crime in the United States by State, 2019

Crime in Florida (2010–2020)
Year	Population	Total	Violent				Property		
Year	Population	Total	Murder	Rape	Robbery	Aggravated assault	Burglary	Larceny-Theft	Vehicle Theft
2010	18,838,613	771,004	987	5,373	26,086	69,523	169,119	458,454	41,462
2011	19,082,262	769,398	984	5,273	25,622	66,319	170,171	461,408	39,621
2012	19,320,749	727,075	1,009	5,260	23,889	63,929	153,563	442,095	37,330
2013	19,600,311	699,163	972	4,765	23,200	61,054	138,915	433,344	34,911
2014	19,905,569	675,119	982	5,038	21,621	61,610	121,379	426,197	36,198
2015	20,244,914	663,895	1,041	5,396	21,137	63,895	109,268	420,341	40,661
2016	20,612,439	642,512	1,111	5,528	20,175	59,816	100,325	410,352	43,135
2017	20,976,812	612,731	1,057	7,936	18,597	58,016	88,835	395,375	42,915
2018	21,244,317	567,997	1,107	8,438	16,884	55,551	71,933	372,919	41,165
2019	21,477,737	542,116	1,122	8,456	16,217	55,475	63,396	358,402	39,048
2020	NA	NA	1,128	7,666	13,470	60,693	52,057	292,842	38,087

== Policing ==
In 2018, Florida had 373 state and local law enforcement agencies. Those agencies employed a total of 85,234 staff. Of the total staff, 47,177 were sworn officers (defined as those with general arrest powers). In 2018, Florida had 222 police officers per 100,000 residents.

== Capital punishment laws ==
Capital punishment is applied in Florida.

== See also ==
- Incarceration in Florida
- List of Florida state prisons
- Law of Florida
- Florida Man
