= Incarceration in Florida =

Overview of incarceration in the U.S. state of Florida

Incarceration in Florida is one of the main forms of punishment, rehabilitation, or both for the commission of felony and other offenses in the state.

== History ==
Mandatory guidelines such as the 1999 10-20-Life and the 1995 Three-strikes law established minimum sentencing for those convicted of crimes. The 1995 law requiring convicts to serve 85% of their sentence and Zero tolerance have all contributed to lengthening prisoners sentences in Florida.

=== Two-strikes law ===
Florida passed HB 1371, the Prisoner Release Reoffender Act, in May 1997. This so-called "two-strikes" law dictates that individuals convicted of certain categories of crime who reoffend within three years is subject to life in prison without parole, even if this is only a second offense, gaining the distinction of, "one of the strictest sentencing laws in the US."

== Cost ==
In 2013, the average cost to house a prisoner was $18,000 per inmate annually.

== Population ==
In 2013, there were 100,844 inmates, aged 14 to 93. 93% of the population were males, 7% females. Figures do not include those in local jails or juvenile justice systems.

53% have been incarcerated for violent crimes. Drugs offenses constitute 17% of the population.

In 2013, 564 people were in prison for driving with a suspended license, in turn, often the result of failure to pay a fine or a fee.

== See also ==
- Crime in Florida
- Florida Department of Corrections
- Law of Florida
