= Crime in Iowa =

In 2019, there were 7,545 violent-crime incidents, and 8,237 offenses reported in the U.S. state of Iowa.

== Statistics ==
In 2019, there were 7,545 violent-crime incidents, and 8,237 offenses reported in Iowa by 246 law enforcement agencies that submitted National Incident-Based Reporting System (NIBRS) data, and covers 98% of the total population.

== Capital punishment laws ==
Capital punishment is not applied in this state.

== Notable Cases ==
1973 - 1973 Gitchie Manitou murders

1995 - Disappearance of Jodi Huisentruit

2018 - Murder of Mollie Tibbetts
