= Crime in Maryland =

Maryland
- Crime rates* (2023)

Violent crimes
- Homicide: 8.5
- Rape: 34^{**}
- Robbery: 164.2
- Aggravated assault: 284.9
- Total violent crime: 459

Property crimes
- Burglary: 131.5
- Larceny-theft: 1,414
- Motor vehicle theft: 388.2
- Arson: not reported
- Total property crime: 1984.3
- Note: Reported crimes per 100,000 population Source: Governor's office of Maryland 2023 data

Crime in Maryland is prevented by Governor’s Office of Crime Prevention and Policy (GOCPP), the state’s lead agency coordinating public safety strategies.

In 2023 there were 150,766 crimes reported in the U.S. state of Maryland, including 525 murders. In 2024, there were 154,699 crimes reported.

== By location ==
=== Baltimore ===
Baltimore reported 223 homicides in 2010. The number of all violent crimes for the city has declined from 21,799 in 1993 to 9,316 in 2010. Even with stark population decline taken into account—Baltimore went from 732,968 residents in 1993 to 620,961 in 2010—the drop in violent crime was significant, falling from 3.0 incidents per 100 residents to 1.6 incidents per 100 residents.

Baltimore's level of violent crime remains higher than the national average. In 2009, a total of 1,318,398 violent crimes were reported nationwide across the United States, equivalent to a rate of 0.4 incidents per 100 people.

In 2011, Baltimore police reported 196 homicides, the lowest number of slayings in the city since a count of 197 homicides in 1978 and far lower than the peak homicide count of 353 slayings in 1993. The drop is significant, but the homicide rate is nevertheless in the same range the city saw in the mid 1980s, when the city had another 130,000 residents. City leaders credit a sustained focus on repeat violent offenders and increased community engagement for the continued drop, reflecting a nationwide decline in crime.

The city recorded a total of 344 homicides in 2015, a number second only to the number recorded in 1993 when the population was 100,000 higher. This was the highest murder rate on a per capita basis ever recorded.

Preliminary data from the Major Cities Chiefs Association indicates mixed results in Maryland’s largest jurisdictions during the first half of 2024. While violent crime in the nation’s 70 largest jurisdictions fell by 6% overall, Maryland’s four largest jurisdictions—Baltimore City, Baltimore County, Montgomery County, and Prince George’s County—experienced varied trends.

== Policing ==
In 2008, Maryland had 142 state and local law enforcement agencies. Those agencies employed a total of 21,267 staff. Of the total staff, 16,013 were sworn officers (defined as those with general arrest powers).

=== Police ratio ===
In 2008, Maryland had 283 police officers per 100,000 residents.

== Capital punishment laws ==
Maryland's former governor, Martin O'Malley, signed a bill on May 2, 2013 to repeal the death penalty.
