= Crime in Pennsylvania =

In 2025 there were 280,727 crimes reported in the U.S. state of Pennsylvania, including 526 murders and nonnegligent manslaughter.

== Policing ==
In 2018, Pennsylvania had 995 State and local law enforcement agencies.Those agencies employed a total of 33,291 staff. Of the total staff, 26,914 were sworn officers (defined as those with general arrest powers).

=== Police ratio ===
In 2018, Pennsylvania had 210 police officers per 100,000 residents.

== Capital punishment laws ==
Capital punishment is legal in Pennsylvania, however no executions have been performed since 1999.

== See also ==
- Law of Pennsylvania
- Philadelphia crime family
- Bufalino crime family
- Pittsburgh crime family
- Schuylkill notes
