= Crime in North Dakota =

Crime in North Dakota refers to crime occurring within the U.S. state of North Dakota.

== State Crime Statistics ==
North Dakota
- Crime rates* (2025)

Violent crimes
- Homicide: 11
- Rape: 334
- Robbery: 147
- Aggravated assault: 1,279
- Total violent crime: 1,771

Property crimes
- Burglary: 1,570
- Larceny-theft: 8,525
- Motor vehicle theft: 1,161
- Arson: 55
- Total property crime: 11,311
- Notes *Number of reported crimes per 100,000 population. 2025 population: 799,358 Source: 2025 FBI UCR Data

Crime in North Dakota (1985–2025)
Year	Population	Aggravated assault	Homicide	Rape	Robbery	Arson	Burglary	Larceny-theft	Motor Vehicle Theft
1985	676,979	219	7	50	44	53	2,889	14,147	801
1986	669,513	211	7	79	47	44	2,576	13,734	802
1987	661,141	255	10	53	51	71	3,034	14,682	823
1988	655,330	250	12	74	54	28	2,882	13,959	783
1989	646,351	270	4	78	61	34	2,335	13,192	736
1990	638,800	206	5	123	36	33	1,914	12,313	704
1991	635,753	220	3	102	43	7	2,096	12,599	715
1992	638,223	317	12	156	51	55	2,441	14,135	929
1993	641,216	297	11	148	52	99	2,314	13,701	924
1994	644,804	297	1	150	71	95	2,061	13,818	957
1995	647,832	329	6	139	63	94	2,175	13,765	1,108
1996	650,382	287	11	139	65	68	1,855	12,143	1,092
1997	649,716	307	6	148	42	73	2,235	13,112	1,111
1998	647,532	277	7	194	65	81	2,180	12,704	1,147
1999	644,259	241	7	151	68	82	2,196	10,957	988
2000	642,200	280	3	164	55	7	1,979	10,607	936
2001	634,448	250	8	167	64	111	1,998	10,815	991
2002	634,110	248	5	154	57	84	2,078	10,755	944
2003	633,837	265	8	148	48	71	1,793	9,569	978
2004	634,366	307	8	167	43	68	1,897	8,911	870
2005	636,677	434	11	171	52	70	1,936	9,238	1,017
2006	635,867	864	13	229	72	129	2,472	9,219	1,032
2007	639,715	935	16	244	74	126	2,226	9,156	948
2008	641,481	990	10	318	72	111	2,256	9,511	883
2009	646,844	1,055	12	271	105	83	2,316	9,185	842
2010	672,591	1,166	10	240	90	82	1,957	8,956	850
2011	683,932	1,269	24	257	91	79	2,387	9,624	950
2012	699,628	1,265	25	274	127	103	2,390	10,495	1,155
2013	723,393	1,434	16	341	160	150	2,955	10,875	1,419
2014	739,482	1,413	23	378	175	207	2,746	11,541	1,542
2015	756,927	1,357	21	388	159	78	3,278	12,633	1,734
2016	757,952	1,351	16	356	181	93	3,243	12,240	1,953
2017	755,393	1,525	10	413	182	111	2,938	11,898	1,758
2018	760,077	1,478	16	397	158	61	2,675	10,989	1,722
2019	762,062	1,491	24	468	180	84	2,602	10,690	1,762
2020	779,094	1,948	33	435	153	109	3,125	11,092	2,093
2021	774,948	1,384	15	444	193	109	3,069	11,321	2,086
2022	779,261	1,521	29	474	217	102	2,887	10,855	2,025
2023	783,926	1,571	28	410	198	65	2,542	11,063	1,749
2024	796,568	1,395	20	415	215	68	2,177	9,852	1,490
2025	799,358	1,279	11	334	147	55	1,570	8,525	1,161
January 2026		74	2	18	14	3	88	372	47

=== City Crime Statistics ===
List of cities in North Dakota (2025)
City	Population (2024)	Aggravated assault	Homicide	Rape	Robbery	Arson	Burglary	Larceny-theft	Motor Vehicle Theft
Fargo	136,285	349	4	84	76	14	728	3,308	456
Bismarck	77,772	126	0	33	28	7	197	1,165	118
Grand Forks	59,845	104	0	27	13	3	87	884	71
Minot	47,440	88	3	37	9	8	68	405	72
West Fargo	41,027	49	0	24	3	1	91	258	43
Williston	28,821	97	1	17	8	0	71	393	43
Dickinson	25,695	38	0	9	0	1	29	331	35
Mandan	24,788	34	0	20	0	0	58	335	51
Jamestown	15,789	14	0	7	0	1	21	174	19

== Policing ==
In 2023, North Dakota had 161 state and local law enforcement agencies. Those agencies employed a total of 5,736 staff. Of the total staff, 2,110 were sworn officers (defined as those with general arrest powers). In 2023, North Dakota had 250 police officers per 100,000 residents.

== Capital punishment laws ==
Capital punishment is not applied in North Dakota.

== See also ==
- Incarceration in North Dakota
- List of North Dakota state prisons
- North Dakota Century Code
