= Crime in Nebraska =

In 2008 there were 60,995 crimes reported in the U.S. state of Nebraska, including 69 murders. In 2014 there were 52,727 crimes, including 53 murders.

== Capital punishment laws ==
Capital punishment is legal in this state for aggravated murder. On November 8, 2016, voters decided to retain it in a statewide referendum.

== By location ==
- Crime in Omaha, Nebraska
