= Crime in Hawaii =

In 2008, there were 49,516 crimes reported in the U.S. state of Hawaii, including 25 murders, 46,004 property crimes, and 365 rapes.

== Capital punishment laws ==
Capital punishment is not applied in this state.

== Notable incidents ==
Notable events related to crime in Hawaii include:

=== Young family killings ===
On November 22, 1965, Maggie Young drowned her five children in the bathtub in their home in Aiea. She was found not fit to stand trial and was committed to a state hospital. She later hanged herself in 1966. The killings were one of Hawaii’s worst mass murders and the worst familicide. In 2001 when Andrea Yates drowned her children, James Young, Maggie’s husband, urged compassion for Andrea and reached out to Yates’ husband to help.
