= Crime in Mississippi =

Data from the Bureau of Justice Statistics showing the growth of Mississippi's prison population

In 2016 there were 91,115 crimes reported in the U.S. state of Mississippi, including 238 murders. In 2017–2018 the violent crime rate dropped 8%. Out of 50 states, Mississippi ranked 41st in terms of public safety in 2024. Social crimes such as drug offenses and possession, as well as property crimes such as robbery saw an overall decrease in 2024. However, violent offenses increased in the state by 1.27% compared to the previous year.

== Cities ==
In 2018 the city listed in Mississippi as the safest was Madison, with 18 violent crimes. As of 2020, the most violent city in Mississippi was Jackson, Mississippi.

== Capital punishment laws ==
Capital punishment is applied in this state, and has been used since 1871. Hanging was the original method of execution in the state, though a variety of legislation surrounding the death sentence has led to the implementation or removal of methods. Currently, electrocution, nitrogen hypoxia, lethal injection and firing squad are all approved means of carrying out the death penalty.

One of the two death sentences of Willie Jerome Manning attracted national attention in May 2013 when the Federal Bureau of Investigation rescinded an evidence report days before Manning's scheduled execution. A key witness in the case would then recant their testimony, leading the charges against Manning for the 1996 Jimmerson-Jordan murders to be dropped. Manning then became the fourth death row exoneree in Mississippi.

== Statistics ==
Data in the table from 2019 and before uses data from the Uniform Crime Reporting system (UCR). Data from 2020 and onwards uses data from the FBI Crime Data Explorer. Note: rape in the years the UCR data is using them is classified as being "Forcible Rape".

Crime in Mississippi (2018–2021)
| Year | Violent | | | | Property | | |
| Year | Murder (Note: In the FBI Crime Data explorer "murder" is not mentioned but the classification of "homicide" will take its place as there are no close equivalencies under "Crime Select") | Rape | Robbery | Aggravated assault | Burglary | Larceny-Theft | Motor Vehicle Theft (Note: This category only uses data from the FBI Crime Data explorer and not from the UCR system.) |
|---|---|---|---|---|---|---|---|
| 2018 | 214 | 596 | 1,700 | 5,419 | 20,355 | 46,201 | 3,335 |
| 2019 | 332 | 747 | 1,700 | 5,493 | 18,660 | 46,300 | 3,644 |
| 2020 | 260 | 710 | 1,117 | 3,881 | 9,933 | 30,267 | 4,409 |
| 2021 | 160 | 719 | 502 | 2,968 | 7,028 | 22,862 | 3,386 |
