= Crime in Kentucky =

In 2025, there were approximately 9,871 violent-crime offenses reported in the U.S. state of Kentucky, representing a violent crime rate of 214.3 offenses per 100,000 residents.

== State statistics ==
In 2008, there were 122,960 crimes reported in Kentucky, including 198 murders. In 2020, there were 9,820 violent-crime incidents, and 11,349 offenses reported in Kentucky by 423 law enforcement agencies that submitted National Incident-Based Reporting System data, and covers 99% of the total population. In 2025, Kentucky reported approximately 9,871 violent-crime offences by 458 of 465 law enforcement agencies reporting NIBRS data, covering 100% of the state's population and yielding a violent-crime rate of 214.3 offenses per 100,000 residents.

=== 2010 ===
Crime in Kentucky, 2010
	Population	Violent crime	Murder and nonnegligent manslaughter	Forcible rape	Robbery	Aggravated assault	Property crime	Burglary	Larceny-theft	Motor vehicle theft
Total crimes	(4,339,367)	10,528	187	1,381	3,748	5,212	110,709	30,311	74,189	6,209
Rate per 100,000 inhabitants		242.6	4.3	31.8	86.4	120.1	2,551.3	698.5	1,709.7	143.1
Source: FBI Uniform Crime Report, 2010

== Capital punishment laws ==
Capital punishment is a legal penalty in the U.S. state of Kentucky.

Despite remaining a legal penalty, there have been no executions in Kentucky since 2008, and only three since 1976. The most recent execution was of Marco Allen Chapman, who was executed for two murders.
