= Crime in Delaware =

In 2008, there were around 37,444 crimes reported in the U.S. state of Delaware, including 57 murders, 31,303 property crimes, and 366 rapes.

== Capital punishment laws ==
Capital punishment is not applied in this state, with the Delaware Supreme Court finding it unconstitutional on August 2, 2016. 16 people were executed in Delaware between 1992 and 2012.

== Recent crime statistics ==
In 2024, Delaware recorded a violent crime rate of 361 offenses per 100,000 residents, alongside a property crime rate of 1,746 per the same population benchmark. Violent crimes, which are defined as offenses committed against individuals, involve the use or threat of physical force and encompass murder, non-negligent manslaughter, rape, robbery, and aggravated assault. Property crimes, by contrast, target the property or assets of another person and include various forms of theft, such as burglary, larceny-theft, and motor vehicle theft.

These statistics are for four specific violent offenses and three specific property offenses that have been consistently tracked by federal authorities since 1929. When contextualized against national figures, Delaware's violent crime rate in 2024 was approximately 0.47 percent higher than the national average, whereas its property crime rate was roughly 0.81 percent lower than the corresponding national benchmark.

Based on available data, the violent crime rate in Delaware reached 7.17 incidents per 1,000 residents in 2026—a figure substantially higher than the national average of 4.43 incidents per 1,000. This places Delaware fifth among U.S. states with the highest violent crime rates. Notably, due to insufficient data, a statewide violent crime rate could not be reported for 2025; however, the 2024 report recorded a rate of 4.5 incidents per 1,000 population, indicating a marked increase over the two-year period. The available data does not include statistics on property crime for 2026.
