= Crime in Arkansas =

Crime in Arkansas refers to crime occurring within the U.S. state of Arkansas.

== State statistics ==
Arkansas
- Crime rates* (2019)

Violent crimes
- Homicide: 8.0
- Rape: 77.2
- Robbery: 51.6
- Aggravated assault: 447.8

Property crimes
- Burglary: 599.6
- Larceny-theft: 2012.6
- Motor vehicle theft: 245.9
- Notes *Number of reported crimes per 100,000 population. Source: 2019 FBI Uniform Crime Report

In 2008, there were 124,224 crimes reported in Arkansas, including 162 murders, 109,752 property crimes, and 1,425 rapes. Since then, violent crime has increased while property crime has decreased. In 2020, there were 99,563 reported crimes, including 20,363 violent crimes and 79,200 property crimes. 321 murders were reported, and there were 2,226 cases of forcible rape. U.S. News & World Report ranked Arkansas as #49th in the category Crime and Corrections.

== Capital punishment laws ==
Capital punishment is a legal penalty in the U.S. state of Arkansas.
