= Crime in Montana =

In 2013 there were 28,397 crimes reported in the U.S. state of Montana, including 22 murders.

== Capital punishment laws ==
Capital punishment was applied in this state up to 2015, when it was suspended for lack of any available drug for lethal injection which met the legal requirements; an attempt in the legislature to renew executions failed in April 2021, as a result of which executions will likely remain suspended until at least 2023.
