= Crime in New Mexico =

The U.S. state of New Mexico had the highest rate of property crime among US states in 2016. New Mexico had the second highest rate for violent crime, following Alaska. Around 27 percent of the population lives in Albuquerque, but the city was home to 42.7 percent of violent crime and 47 percent of property crime in New Mexico.

In 2016, New Mexico law enforcement agencies reported 81,931 property crimes and 14,619 violent crimes throughout the state, for a rate 3,937.1 property crimes and 702.5 violent crimes per 100,000 residents. Across the nation the property crime rate per 100,000 residents was 2,450.7 and the violent crime rate was 386.3.

== Drug abuse ==
Since the 1990s, New Mexico has led the Western United States in drug overdose deaths, the vast majority a result of opioids. New Mexico's death rate has more than tripled since 1990. In 2003, New Mexico led the country in drug overdose rate with more than twice the national average, and 4 New Mexico counties were among the top 25 in the United States for overdose rates. While deaths due to illicit drugs have remained steady during the past decade, deaths due to prescription drugs (particularly opioid pain relievers) have increased dramatically.

Overdose death rates (per 100,000)

| Year | New Mexico | United States | Note |
| 1990 | 7.6 | 3.4 | |
| 1991 | 7.8 | 3.7 | |
| 1992 | 8.9 | 4.1 | |
| 1993 | 10.1 | 4.7 | |
| 1994 | 9.6 | 4.8 | |
| 1995 | 11.9 | 4.8 | |
| 1996 | 11.7 | 4.9 | |
| 1997 | 11.9 | 5.3 | |
| 1998 | 15.0 | 5.6 | |
| 1999 | 15.0 | 6.1 | |
| 2000 | 15.2 | 6.2 | |
| 2001 | 14.4 | 6.8 | |
| 2002 | 16.3 | 8.2 | |
| 2003 | 19.0 | 8.9 | |
| 2004 | 16.3 | 9.4 | |
| 2005 | 19.7 | 10.1 | |
| 2006 | 21.4 | 11.5 | |
| 2007 | 22.5 | 11.9 | |
| 2008 | 26.4 | 11.9 | |
| 2009 | 21.6 | 11.9 | |
| 2010 | 23.3 | 12.3 | |
| 2011 | 25.8 | 13.2 | |
| 2012 | 24.3 | 13.1 | |
| 2013 | 22.1 | 13.8 | |
| 2014 | 22.1 | 14.7 | |
| 2015 | 26.8 | 16.3 | |
