= Crime in Indiana =

Indiana has an annual crime count of 126,439 of which 20,925 is violent crimes and 105,514 are property. The crime rate per 1000 residents is 18.50 which is slightly below the national average of the US.

	Violent	Property	Total
Number of Crimes	20,925	105,514	126,439
Crime Rate (per 1,000 residents)	3.06	15.44	18.50

The violent crime rate in Indiana is 18.50. The violent crime comparison is 3.06 (per 1000 residents) The chance of becoming a victim of violent crime is 1 in 327. Indiana's violent crime is slightly below the US nationwide average and on par with murder rates.

== Indiana Violent Crimes ==
=== Population: 6,833,037 ===
	Murder	Rape	Robbery	Assault
Report Total	427	2,241	2,936	15,321
Rate per 1,000	0.06	0.33	0.43	2.24

== United States Violent Crimes ==
=== Population: 333,287,557 ===
	Murder	Rape	Robbery	Assault
Report Total	21,156	133,294	220,450	893,980
Rate per 1,000	0.06	0.40	0.66	2.68

== Indiana Property Crimes ==
=== Population: 6,833,037 ===
	Burglary	Theft	Motor Vehicle Theft
Report Total	15,449	76,437	13,628
Rate per 1,000	2.26	11.19	1.99

== United States Property Crimes ==
=== Population: 333,287,557 ===
	Burglary	Theft	Motor Vehicle Theft
Report Total	899,293	4,672,363	942,173
Rate per 1,000	2.70	14.02	2.83

== Policing ==
In 2008, Indiana had 482 state and local law enforcement agencies. Those agencies employed a total of 19,940 staff. Of the total staff, 13,171 were sworn officers (defined as those with general arrest powers).

=== Police ratio ===
In 2008, Indiana had 206 police officers per 100,000 residents.

== Capital punishment laws ==
Capital punishment is applied in this state.

== Notable Cases ==
1965 - Murder of Sylvia Likens

1978 - Burger Chef murders

1991 - Murder of Shanda Sharer
