= Crime in Wisconsin =

In 2021 there were 109,587 crimes reported in the U.S. state of Wisconsin, including 332 murders, 2,475 acts of rape, 2,707 accounts of robbery, and 13,579 assaults. The chances of becoming a victim of a crime was 1 in 309.

== Statistics ==
In 2008, there were 170,868 crimes reported in Wisconsin, including 146 murders. In 2014, there were 136,952 crimes reported, including 165 murders.

== Capital punishment laws ==
Capital punishment is not applied in this state.

== Notable Cases ==
1925 - Murder of Arthur "Buddy" Schumacher

2007 - Murder of Erika Hill

2021 - Waukesha Christmas parade attack

2024 - Abundant Life Christian School shooting
