= Crime in Utah =

Crime in Utah manifests in various forms, including but not limited to violent crimes, property crimes, drug-related offenses, and white-collar crimes. While some regions in Utah report lower crime rates relative to national averages, certain urban areas experience elevated levels of specific types of crime. The state grapples with a range of law enforcement challenges that reflect both its urban and rural landscapes, as well as its unique sociocultural factors.

== Types of crime ==
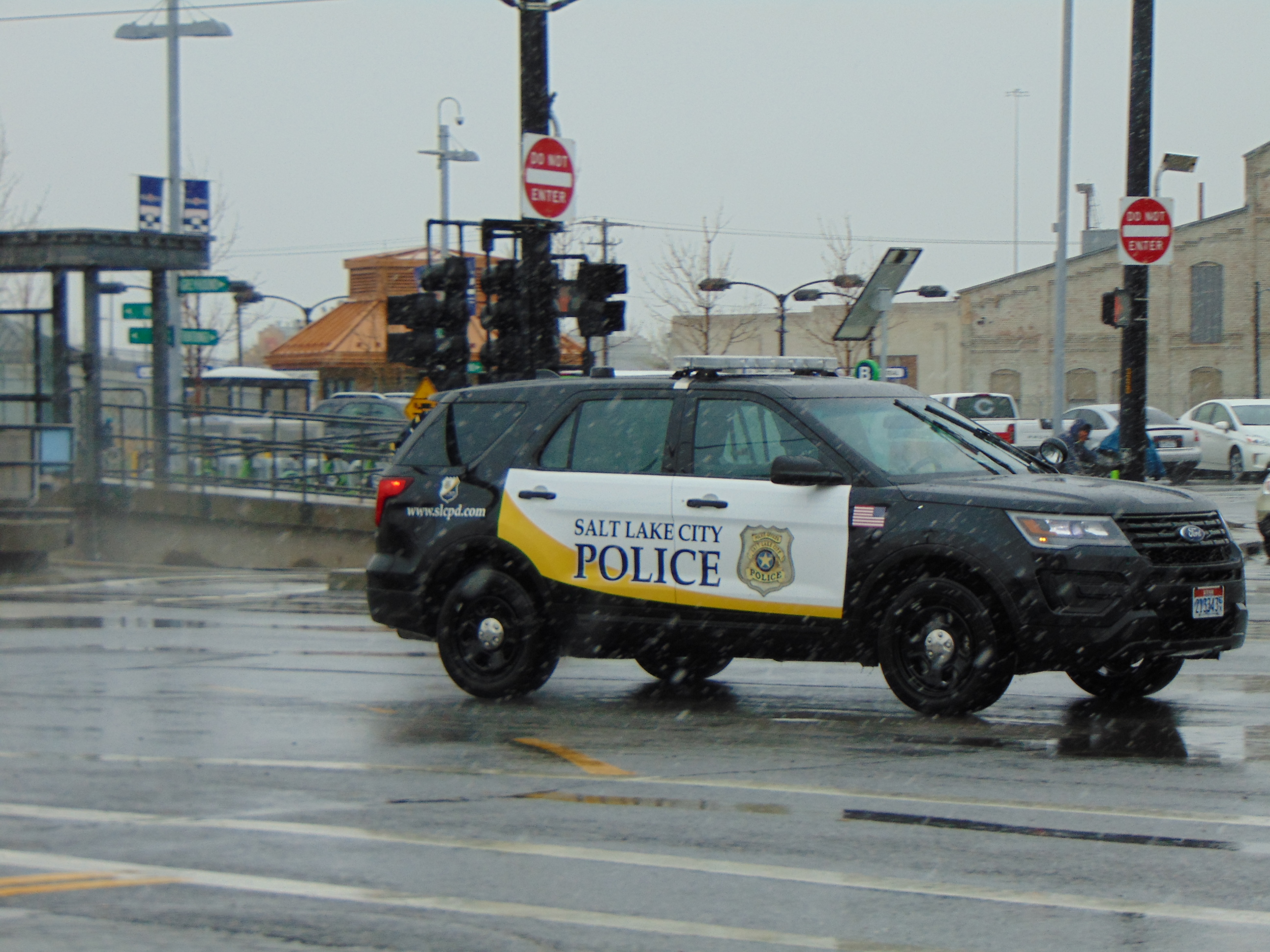
Salt Lake City Police vehicle

=== Violent crime ===
Utah experiences a range of violent crimes, including homicide, assault, and sexual assault. Like many states, urban areas such as Salt Lake City tend to have higher violent crime rates compared to rural regions.

=== Property crime ===
Property crimes like burglary, larceny, and motor vehicle theft are more common than violent crimes. Residential areas and neighborhoods around universities have seen spikes in property crimes at different points in time.

=== Drug-related crime ===
Utah has seen a significant increase in drug-related crimes, particularly related to opioids. This includes possession, distribution, and manufacturing of illegal substances.

=== Hate crimes ===
Hate crimes are of particular concern due to the state's diverse population. Legislative steps have been taken to address this issue and implement harsher penalties for hate crimes.

== Crime prevention and law enforcement ==
=== Local police and Sheriff's departments ===
Utah's law enforcement infrastructure includes local police departments for urban areas and Sheriff's departments for more rural regions.

=== Utah Highway Patrol ===
The Utah Highway Patrol is responsible for enforcing traffic laws across the state and plays a significant role in drug interdiction.

=== Community policing ===
Many areas have introduced community policing efforts, which have shown promise in reducing crime rates.

== Legal Framework ==
=== Sentencing and corrections ===
Utah has mandatory sentencing guidelines for certain types of crimes, including violent and drug-related offenses.

=== Capital punishment ===
Capital punishment is legal in the state of Utah. Aggravated murder is the only crime subject to the penalty of death under Utah law. Lethal injection is the state's method of choice; however, as of 2015, execution by firing squad is authorized if the drugs required for lethal injection are unobtainable, or if the inmate was sentenced before 2004 and chose firing squad as the method of execution.

=== Gun laws ===
Utah has relatively lax gun laws, and this has been a subject of debate especially in the wake of incidents involving firearms.

=== Juvenile justice ===
The state has special courts and correctional facilities for juvenile offenders, with a focus on rehabilitation.

== Notable criminal cases ==
One of the most infamous crimes in Utah's history was committed by Ted Bundy, who was active in the state during the 1970s. He was responsible for the disappearances and murders of several young women.

== Statistics ==
Crime in Utah
Year	Population	Index	Violent	Property	Murder	Rape	Robbery	Aggravated Assault	Burglary	Larceny-Theft	Vehicle-Theft
1970	1,059,273	44,507	1,459	43,048	36	115	563	745	9,692	30,006	3,350
1980	1,458,729	85,782	4,425	81,357	55	404	1,170	2,796	19,283	57,354	4,720
1990	1,722,850	97,512	4,892	92,620	52	651	980	3,209	15,172	73,352	4,096
2000	2,233,169	99,958	5,711	94,247	43	863	1,242	3,563	14,348	73,438	6,461
2010	2,775,479	94,241	5,925	88,316	53	983	1,269	3,620	15,095	67,242	5,979
2015	2,990,632	96,935	7,138	89,797	57	1,247	1,329	4,048	12,606	68,464	8,727
2016	3,051,217	97,465	7,407	90,058	72	1,116	1,541	4,274	12,836	67,834	9,388
2017	3,103,118	93,716	7,515	86,201	74	1,758	1,498	4,185	11,780	64,955	9,466
2018	3,153,550	83,845	7,551	76,294	63	1,854	1,237	4,397	10,079	58,406	7,809
2019	3,205,958	77,099	7,553	69,546	72	1,822	1,125	4,534	8,871	53,937	6,738
