= Crime in Rhode Island =

In 2019, there were 25 murders, 491 rapes, 418 robberies, and 2,321 burglaries reported in the U.S. state of Rhode Island.

== Capital punishment laws ==
Capital punishment is not applied in this state.

== History ==
The first formal law system in Rhode Island was established in 1647, which created a code, which was based on the English criminal code, but could also be changed to the likings of the colonists. According to this, each person was disallowed from Murder, Witchcraft, Burglary, Theft, Fornication, and High Treason, the latter requiring being sent to trial in England, and the rest being punishable by imprisonment.

== Notable incidents ==
=== Lee’s Cathay Terrace massacre ===
On June 17, 1978 in Warwick, Gan Fong Chin, a man with a history of mental problems, entered his former workplace, Lee’s Cathay Terrace, and shot and killed 4 of his co-workers (Including a pregnant woman) with a rifle.During the shooting, an elderly patron died of heart attack. He was convicted of the murders and received four life sentences. It is one of the worst mass murders in Rhode Island’s history and the deadliest mass shooting in Rhode Island.

== Notable Cases ==
2026 - 2026 Pawtucket shooting
