= Crime in South Dakota =

South Dakota, a state in the Midwestern United States, generally has a lower crime rate than the national average. However, crime rates vary within the state, with some rural areas having much lower rates than in the Sioux Falls or Rapid City areas. Overall crime rates in South Dakota have been relatively stable in recent years.

== Types of crime ==
In 2020, the violent crime rate in South Dakota was 297.2 per 100,000 people, compared to the national average of 366.7 per 100,000 people. Aggravated assault was the most common violent crime, followed by robbery and rape.

The property crime rate in South Dakota was 1,907.5 per 100,000 people, compared to the national average of 2,109.9 per 100,000 people. Larceny-theft was the most common property crime, followed by burglary and motor vehicle theft.

== Law enforcement ==
South Dakota's law enforcement landscape features several layers. At the state level, the South Dakota Division of Criminal Investigation spearheads major crime investigations and supports local departments, while agencies like the South Dakota Highway Patrol and Game, Fish & Parks Conservation Officers ensure safety on rural roads and natural resources. Locally, sheriffs' offices and municipal police departments handle everyday policing and community engagement. Despite the state's lower crime rates, challenges remain, particularly with methamphetamine use and trafficking.

== Judicial system ==
South Dakota's judicial system operates under a unified structure.. At the apex sits the South Dakota Supreme Court. One tier below are the eight circuit courts, geographically dividing the state and handling most major criminal and civil cases. Led by circuit judges, these courts conduct trials, issue rulings, and oversee matters ranging from felonies to family law disputes. Finally, magistrate courts handle minor criminal offenses, traffic violations, and small claims cases. These courts, presided over by magistrates, aim to resolve less complex legal issues efficiently and provide accessible justice to residents.

Capital punishment is used in this state.
