= Crime in Vermont =

== State statistics ==
In 2011 there were 16,011 crimes reported in Vermont, including 11 murders. In 2014 there were 10,173 crimes reported, including 10 murders. In 2023 there were 13,358 crimes reported, including 17 homicides.

From 2000 to 2013, the state experienced a 77% increase in treatment for all opiates. About 80% of all inmates are either addicted or in prison because of their addiction.

== Capital punishment laws ==
Capital punishment is no longer applied in the state as of 1972.

== See also ==
- Vermont Department of Corrections
