= Crime in Wyoming =

This article discusses crime in the U.S. state of Wyoming.

== Statistics ==
Crime in Wyoming (2008-2019)
Year	Population	Index	Violent (Note: Violent crime is defined as murder, rape, robbery, and assault.)	Property (Note: Property crime is defined as burglary, larceny-theft, and vehicle-theft.)	Murder	Rape	Robbery	Assault	Burglary	Larceny-Theft	Vehicle-Theft
2008	532,981	15,823	1,312	14,511	12	184	86	1,030	2,200	11,588	723
2009	544,270	15,439	1,196	14,243	11	172	78	935	2,176	11,310	757
2010	564,554	14,986	1,117	13,869	8	162	77	870	2,151	11,126	592
2011	567,356	14,123	1,245	12,878	18	146	71	1,010	1,864	10,493	521
2012	576,626	14,383	1,161	13,222	14	154	61	932	2,125	10,513	584
2013	583,223	14,021	1,212	12,809	17	144	74	917	1,956	10,275	578
2014	584,304	12,619	1,142	11,477	16	127	53	899	1,689	9,185	603
2015	586,555	12,451	1,300	11,151	16	124	59	1,054	1,762	8,797	592
2016	585,501	12,890	1,430	11,460	20	150	59	1,146	1,771	8,889	800
2017	578,934	11,886	1,358	10,528	14	253	98	993	1,556	8,211	761
2018	577,601	11,543	1,235	10,308	14	261	75	885	1,551	7,974	783
2019	578,759	10,351	1,258	9,093	13	324	67	854	1,396	6,984	713

== Capital punishment laws ==
Capital punishment is legal in Wyoming, although no one has been executed since January 22, 1992. On Feb 15, 2019, the Wyoming Senate rejected a bill to repeal the death penalty.
