= Crime in Tennessee =

In 2010, 356 people were murdered in the U.S. state of Tennessee. In 2009 and 2010, Tennessee had the highest rate of violent gun crime of any US state, although less than that of Washington D.C. Tennessee ranked highest in the nation for the rate of aggravated assaults with a firearm, and ranked fifth-worst in robberies.

In 2014, 240,295 crimes were reported, including 371 murders. In 2018, 424,784 crimes, including 498 murders and 42,226 other violent crimes (623.7 per 100,000 people) were reported.

In 2024, the state reported 583 total murders and 475,718 total Group-A offenses. Nashville and Memphis, the two biggest cities in the state, reported 102 and 249 murders in 2024, respectively. Total Group-A offenses were down from 2023, when the total was reported to be 509,261. Group-A offenses are reported by the Tennessee Bureau of Investigation and include such crimes as murder, aggravated assault, and domestic violence.

In 2025, the state reported 484 murders (down 18% from 592 in 2024); more than 30,000 aggravated assaults (down 15%); overall over 429,000 Group A offenses. Violent crime declined statewide. Majority of 2025 murder victims were aged 25-34 (shift from 18-24 in 2024). Extortion/blackmail up 3.23%; identity-theft victims up 16.35%.

== Urban areas ==
=== Memphis ===
In 2002 and 2006, the Memphis metropolitan area ranked number one in violent crimes for major cities around the U.S. according to the FBI's annual crime rankings. In 2001, 2005, 2006 and 2007, the Memphis metropolitan area ranked second most dangerous among cities with over 500,000 population.

In September of 2025, it was revealed by the Memphis Police Department that overall crime in the city had reached 25-year lows. Preliminary figures from the MPD for 2026 showed crime had continued to trend downward, with all major crimes down 44% and murders down from 110 to 62 through June.

=== Jackson ===
According to Morgan Quitno's 2010 Metropolitan Crime Rate Rankings, the Jackson metropolitan area had the 13th highest crime rate in the United States. Jackson is the primary city within the wider Jackson metropolitan area. The Morgan Quitno list of the "Top 25 Most Dangerous Cities of 2007" ranked Jackson as the 9th most dangerous metropolitan area in the United States. In 2006, it was listed as the 18th most dangerous.

== Policing ==
In 2018, Tennessee had 363 state and local law enforcement agencies. Those agencies employed 26,749, including 17,544 sworn officers (those with general arrest powers). In 2018, Tennessee had 259 police officers per 100,000 residents.

== Capital punishment ==
Capital punishment is utilized in Tennessee. As of May 2023, 45 inmates were on death row. The last execution occurred on February 20, 2020: Nicholas Todd Sutton was executed via electric chair.
