= Crime in Nevada =

The rate of crime in Nevada has, for the past 30 years, been generally above the United States' national average. However, the rate of violent crime has declined considerably in the past decade. In 2020, Nevada had the 13th highest rate of violent crime per 100,000 inhabitants among U.S. states and territories, dropping from having the 2nd highest in 2014. 2022 marked the first year-over-year increase in the violent crime rate since 2015.

== Statistics ==
Crime in Nevada (2010-2019)
Year	Population	Index	Violent	Property	Murder	Rape	Robbery	Aggravated assault	Burglary	Larceny Theft	Vehicle Theft
2010	2,704,283	92,933	17,929	75,004	158	965	5,298	11,508	22,286	42,533	10,185
2011	2,720,028	85,527	15,452	70,075	139	913	4,308	10,092	20,342	40,156	9,577
2012	2,754,354	94,273	16,763	77,510	124	931	4,918	10,790	22,120	45,372	10,018
2013	2,791,494	96,065	16,888	79,177	163	1,090	5,183	10,060	23,047	46,132	9,998
2014	2,838,281	92,617	18,043	74,574	170	987	5,954	10,562	21,924	42,466	10,184
2015	2,883,758	97,255	20,118	77,137	178	1,232	6,287	11,965	22,360	43,426	11,351
2016	2,940,058	95,983	19,936	76,047	224	1,292	6,340	11,639	18,850	44,017	13,180
2017	2,972,405	94,983	16,663	78,320	266	1,896	4,841	9,660	20,049	45,459	12,812
2018	3,027,341	90,713	16,715	73,998	202	2,329	3,862	10,322	17,741	44,341	11,916
2019	3,080,156	86,735	15,210	71,525	143	2,161	3,286	9,620	15,510	44,755	11,260

== Capital punishment laws ==
Capital punishment is legal in Nevada through lethal injection, and the most recent execution was issued to Daryl Mack on April 26, 2006.

== Notable Cases ==
1980 - Reno Thanksgiving Day Massacre

1996 - Murder of Tupac Shakur

2011 - Carson City IHOP shooting

2014 - 2014 Las Vegas shootings

2017 - 2017 Las Vegas shooting
