= Crime in New York (state) =

New York State
- Crime rates* (2024)

Violent crimes
- Homicide: 3.2
- Rape: 26.7
- Robbery: 103.1
- Aggravated assault: 270.5
- Total violent crime: 403.5

Property crimes
- Burglary: 145.7
- Larceny-theft: 1426.5
- Motor vehicle theft: 160.4
- Total property crime: 1732.6
- Note: Reported crimes per 100,000 population Source: New York State Index Crime

In 2012, there were 451,142 crimes reported in the U.S. state of New York, including 686 murders. In 2014, 409,386 crimes were reported in the state, including 616 murders. This number further decreased in 2019, in which 335,736 crimes were reported, with 558 cases of murder. Throughout 2010-2019, violent crime dropped by 8.0%, and property crime dropped by -29.0%.

== Crime in Yonkers ==
In 2000 The New York Times reported that there were at least 30 street gangs operating in Yonkers. Mexican immigrants have contributed to the rise of Mexican gangs in Yonkers. The largest Mexican gangs operating in Yonkers in 2000 were Chicano Nation, Aztec Pride, Vatos Locos and 13 Locos. A district attorney for Westchester County attributed the high levels of gang activity to strict law enforcement practices within the city limits of New York City. Gang units collected intelligence on gangs by photographing gang tags and passing the data on to graffiti cleanup crews.

22 gang members were charged with narcotics and firearms offenses in 2012 in three federal indictments in the United States District Court for the Southern District of New York. United States v. Mark David et al charged the gang with intent to distribute crack cocaine and marijuana, and firearms charges related to that offense. In 2016 the United States Department of Justice announced that Da'quan Johnson had been sentenced to 30 years for murder, racketeering, and narcotics crimes that he committed as a member of a street gang based in Yonkers.

Gang violence was the source of over half the shootings in Yonkers in 2020. Shootings were up 60% in 2020 compared with the previous year, and gang related shootings were up 30%. Mayor Mike Spano and the Yonkers Police Department announced that the rise of gang violence would be met with increased surveillance, law enforcement and collaboration with federal officials.

== Crime in New York City ==
Crime rates in New York City spiked over the post-war period as the city experienced white flight. The highest crime totals were recorded in the late 1980s and early 1990s as the crack epidemic surged, and then dropped through the 1990s and 2000s.

During the 1990s, the New York City Police Department (NYPD) adopted CompStat, broken windows policing, and other strategies in a major effort to reduce crime. The city's dramatic drop in crime has been variously attributed to a number of factors, including the end of the crack epidemic, the increased incarceration rate, gentrification, an aging population, and the decline of lead poisoning in children.

The boroughs of Queens and Staten Island have historically had lower crime rates compared to Brooklyn, The Bronx and Manhattan. Since 1985, the Bronx has consistently had the highest murder and violent crime rate among the five boroughs.

Since 2017, murders in the city have increased bucking the trend. Murders in New York City surged in 2020 by 47% to 468 from 319 the year prior, one of the most significant increases in the city's history, but still lower than any year between 1960 and 2011. There were 488 murders in 2021, the highest total since 2011.

== Policing ==
There are than 500 police and sheriffs’ departments in New York State. Statistics on police departments are kept by the Office of Justice Research and Performance of the New York State Division of Criminal Justice Services.

Law Enforcement Personnel by Agency: 2025
County / City	Police Department	Sworn Full Time	Sworn Part Time	Sworn Total	Civilian Full Time	Civilian Part Time	Civilian Total	Full Time Total	Part Time Total	Grand Total
Albany	Albany County Sheriff	147	0	147	86	92	178	233	92	325
Albany	Albany City Police Department	269	0	269	98	37	135	367	37	404
Albany	Cohoes City Police Department	35	0	35	2	0	2	37	0	37
Albany	Watervliet City Police Department	26	0	26	0	3	3	26	3	29
Albany	Green Island Village Police Department	0	22	22	0	0	0	0	22	22
Albany	Altamont Village Police Department	0	12	12	0	0	0	0	12	12
Albany	Menands Village Police Department	14	4	18	1	1	2	15	5	20
Albany	Bethlehem Town Police Department	36	0	36	15	3	18	51	3	54
Albany	Guilderland Town Police Department	42	0	42	17	2	19	59	2	61
Albany	Colonie Town Police Department	117	0	117	40	8	48	157	8	165
Albany	Coeymans Town Police Department	5	8	13	1	0	1	6	8	14
Albany	SUNY Police - Albany	37	0	37	15	0	15	52	0	52
Albany	SUNY Police - Albany Plaza	4	0	4	1	0	1	5	0	5
Allegany	Allegany County Sheriff	22	3	25	22	9	31	44	12	56
Allegany	Alfred Village Police Department	6	4	10	0	0	0	6	4	10
Allegany	Andover Village Police Department	0	8	8	0	0	0	0	8	8
Allegany	Bolivar Village Police Department	0	3	3	0	0	0	0	3	3
Allegany	Cuba Town Police Department	7	9	16	0	0	0	7	9	16
Allegany	Wellsville Village Police Department	11	1	12	1	0	1	12	1	13
Allegany	Friendship Town Police Department	0	7	7	0	0	0	0	7	7
Allegany	Belmont Village Police Department	0	8	8	0	0	0	0	8	8
Allegany	Willing Town Police Department	0	4	4	0	0	0	0	4	4
Allegany	Independence Town Police Department	0	3	3	0	2	2	0	5	5
Allegany	SUNY Police - Alfred	12	0	12	4	0	4	16	0	16
Broome	Broome County Sheriff	75	26	101	25	2	27	100	28	128
Broome	Binghamton City Police Department	134	0	134	14	0	14	148	0	148
Broome	Endicott Village Police Department	35	2	37	3	1	4	38	3	41
Broome	Johnson City Village Police Department	45	0	45	3	7	10	48	7	55
Broome	Port Dickinson Village Police Department	3	9	12	0	0	0	3	9	12
Broome	Vestal Town Police Department	43	1	44	4	0	4	47	1	48
Broome	SUNY Police - Binghamton	35	0	35	15	1	16	50	1	51
Cattaraugus	Cattaraugus County Sheriff	60	31	91	30	10	40	90	41	131
Cattaraugus	Olean City Police Department	33	0	33	6	17	23	39	17	56
Cattaraugus	Allegany Village Police Department	3	11	14	0	0	0	3	11	14
Cattaraugus	Ellicottville Town Police Department	5	11	16	0	2	2	5	13	18
Cattaraugus	Franklinville Village Police Department	2	8	10	0	0	0	2	8	10
Cattaraugus	Cattaraugus Village Police Department	0	3	3	0	0	0	0	3	3
Cattaraugus	Portville Village Police Department	1	6	7	0	0	0	1	6	7
Cattaraugus	Salamanca City Police Department	20	6	26	2	4	6	22	10	32
Cayuga	Cayuga County Sheriff	37	4	41	7	0	7	44	4	48
Cayuga	Auburn City Police Department	68	0	68	6	24	30	74	24	98
Cayuga	Weedsport Village Police Department	0	11	11	0	0	0	0	11	11
Cayuga	Port Byron Village Police Department	0	4	4	0	0	0	0	4	4
Cayuga	Moravia Village Police Department	2	5	7	0	0	0	2	5	7
Chautauqua	Chautauqua County Sheriff	81	35	116	42	23	65	123	58	181
Chautauqua	Dunkirk City Police Department	33	0	33	0	0	0	33	0	33
Chautauqua	Jamestown City Police Department	60	2	62	10	3	13	70	5	75
Chautauqua	Lakewood-Busti Police Department	11	6	17	1	0	1	12	6	18
Chautauqua	Fredonia Village Police Department	15	1	16	4	0	4	19	1	20
Chautauqua	Westfield Village Police Department	5	2	7	0	1	1	5	3	8
Chautauqua	Carroll Town Police Department	0	5	5	0	0	0	0	5	5
Chautauqua	Ellicott Town Police Department	13	7	20	0	0	0	13	7	20
Chautauqua	SUNY Police - Fredonia	13	0	13	3	0	3	16	0	16
Chemung	Chemung County Sheriff	44	14	58	6	2	8	50	16	66
Chemung	Elmira City Police Department	72	1	73	10	1	11	82	2	84
Chemung	Elmira Heights Village Police Department	10	2	12	0	3	3	10	5	15
Chemung	Horseheads Village Police Department	9	3	12	0	1	1	9	4	13
Chemung	Elmira Town Police Department	4	5	9	0	0	0	4	5	9
Chenango	Chenango County Sheriff	24	2	26	7	3	10	31	5	36
Chenango	Greene Village Police Department	1	4	5	0	0	0	1	4	5
Chenango	Norwich City Police Department	20	0	20	1	0	1	21	0	21
Chenango	Oxford Village Police Department	2	2	4	0	0	0	2	2	4
Chenango	Sherburne Village Police Department	0	9	9	0	0	0	0	9	9
Chenango	New Berlin Town Police Department	1	1	2	0	0	0	1	1	2
Clinton	Plattsburgh City Police Department	40	3	43	8	8	16	48	11	59
Clinton	SUNY Police - Plattsburgh	15	0	15	6	4	10	21	4	25
Columbia	Columbia County Sheriff	61	8	69	12	12	24	73	20	93
Columbia	Hudson City Police Department	23	0	23	6	6	12	29	6	35
Columbia	Philmont Village Police Department	0	9	9	0	0	0	0	9	9
Columbia	Greenport Town Police Department	0	6	6	0	0	0	0	6	6
Columbia	Chatham Village Police Department	0	16	16	0	0	0	0	16	16
Columbia	Stockport Town Police Department	0	9	9	0	0	0	0	9	9
Cortland	Cortland County Sheriff	36	8	44	4	0	4	40	8	48
Cortland	Cortland City Police Department	46	2	48	2	0	2	48	2	50
Cortland	Homer Village Police Department	5	17	22	1	5	6	6	22	28
Cortland	SUNY Police - Cortland	17	0	17	8	0	8	25	0	25
Delaware	Delaware County Sheriff	20	7	27	6	5	11	26	12	38
Delaware	Delhi Village Police Department	5	14	19	0	0	0	5	14	19
Delaware	Hancock Village Police Department	1	6	7	0	0	0	1	6	7
Delaware	Sidney Village Police Department	8	0	8	0	1	1	8	1	9
Delaware	Colchester Town Police Department	2	5	7	0	0	0	2	5	7
Delaware	SUNY Police - Delhi	12	0	12	5	0	5	17	0	17
Dutchess	Dutchess County Sheriff	116	15	131	22	1	23	138	16	154
Dutchess	Beacon City Police Department	33	0	33	4	2	6	37	2	39
Dutchess	Poughkeepsie City Police Department	86	0	86	26	0	26	112	0	112
Dutchess	Fishkill Village Police Department	0	24	24	0	2	2	0	26	26
Dutchess	Millerton Village Police Department	0	6	6	0	0	0	0	6	6
Dutchess	Wappingers Falls Village Police Department	3	15	18	1	9	10	4	24	28
Dutchess	Red Hook Village Police Department	5	9	14	0	0	0	5	9	14
Dutchess	Rhinebeck Village Police Department	0	15	15	1	0	1	1	15	16
Dutchess	Millbrook Village Police Department	0	7	7	0	0	0	0	7	7
Dutchess	Pine Plains Town Police Department	0	6	6	0	0	0	0	6	6
Dutchess	Poughkeepsie Town Police Department	81	0	81	14	11	25	95	11	106
Dutchess	Fishkill Town Police Department	0	53	53	2	13	15	2	66	68
Dutchess	Hyde Park Town Police Department	20	8	28	5	4	9	25	12	37
Dutchess	East Fishkill Town Police Department	30	0	30	7	3	10	37	3	40
Erie	Erie County Sheriff	175	18	193	153	5	158	328	23	351
Erie	Buffalo City Police Department	785	0	785	175	115	290	960	115	1,075
Erie	Lackawanna City Police Department	45	0	45	6	0	6	51	0	51
Erie	Tonawanda City Police Department	31	0	31	6	9	15	37	9	46
Erie	Kenmore Village Police Department	26	0	26	4	7	11	30	7	37
Erie	East Aurora-Town Of Aurora Police Department	17	1	18	4	9	13	21	10	31
Erie	Depew Village Police Department	33	0	33	8	7	15	41	7	48
Erie	Gowanda Village Police Department	0	15	15	0	1	1	0	16	16
Erie	Blasdell Village Police Department	0	29	29	0	0	0	0	29	29
Erie	Hamburg Village Police Department	14	0	14	1	8	9	15	8	23
Erie	Akron Village Police Department	2	17	19	0	0	0	2	17	19
Erie	Niagara Frontier Transportation Authority Police Department	83	0	83	4	0	4	87	0	87
Erie	Amherst Town Police Department	158	0	158	32	51	83	190	51	241
Erie	Brant Town Police Department	0	15	15	0	1	1	0	16	16
Erie	Cheektowaga Town Police Department	123	0	123	39	76	115	162	76	238
Erie	Orchard Park Town Police Department	41	0	41	11	5	16	52	5	57
Erie	Eden Town Police Department	3	18	21	1	2	3	4	20	24
Erie	Evans Town Police Department	25	6	31	12	12	24	37	18	55
Erie	Grand Island Town Police Department	0	27	27	0	0	0	0	27	27
Erie	Hamburg Town Police Department	66	0	66	3	5	8	69	5	74
Erie	Lancaster Town Police Department	55	0	55	16	1	17	71	1	72
Erie	Tonawanda Town Police Department	97	0	97	48	56	104	145	56	201
Erie	West Seneca Town Police Department	66	0	66	11	31	42	77	31	108
Erie	SUNY Police - Buffalo	59	0	59	16	0	16	75	0	75
Erie	SUNY Police - Buffalo State College	26	0	26	6	0	6	32	0	32
Essex	Essex County Sheriff	20	4	24	3	0	3	23	4	27
Essex	Lake Placid Village Police Department	10	1	11	1	1	2	11	2	13
Essex	Ticonderoga Town Police Department	8	5	13	0	1	1	8	6	14
Essex	Moriah Town Police Department	1	0	1	0	0	0	1	0	1
Franklin	Franklin County Sheriff	4	12	16	2	1	3	6	13	19
Franklin	Tupper Lake Village Police Department	6	2	8	0	1	1	6	3	9
Franklin	Saranac Lake Village Police Department	12	0	12	1	0	1	13	0	13
Franklin	Malone Village Police Department	14	0	14	1	0	1	15	0	15
Fulton	Fulton County Sheriff	28	13	41	20	5	25	48	18	66
Fulton	Gloversville City Police Department	35	0	35	2	2	4	37	2	39
Fulton	Johnstown City Police Department	26	0	26	0	0	0	26	0	26
Fulton	Northville Village Police Department	1	7	8	0	0	0	1	7	8
Genesee	Genesee County Sheriff	47	0	47	39	15	54	86	15	101
Genesee	Batavia City Police Department	36	0	36	5	3	8	41	3	44
Genesee	LeRoy Village Police Department	9	8	17	0	2	2	9	10	19
Greene	Greene County Sheriff	42	21	63	7	0	7	49	21	70
Greene	Athens Village Police Department	0	15	15	0	2	2	0	17	17
Greene	Catskill Village Police Department	10	8	18	2	5	7	12	13	25
Greene	Coxsackie Village Police Department	0	16	16	0	0	0	0	16	16
Greene	Windham Town Police Department	0	10	10	0	0	0	0	10	10
Greene	Hunter Town Police Department	3	6	9	0	0	0	3	6	9
Greene	Durham Town Police Department	0	3	3	0	1	1	0	4	4
Greene	Cairo Town Police Department	1	10	11	0	0	0	1	10	11
Hamilton	Hamilton County Sheriff	6	4	10	1	0	1	7	4	11
Hamilton	Inlet Town Police Department	3	5	8	0	0	0	3	5	8
Hamilton	Herkimer County Sheriff	13	25	38	6	0	6	19	25	44
Hamilton	Ilion Village Police Department	18	2	20	2	1	3	20	3	23
Herkimer	Mohawk Village Police Department	4	10	14	0	1	1	4	11	15
Herkimer	Herkimer Village Police Department	17	3	20	0	0	0	17	3	20
Herkimer	Dolgeville Village Police Department	3	6	9	0	0	0	3	6	9
Herkimer	Little Falls City Police Department	15	12	27	1	4	5	16	16	32
Herkimer	Webb Town Police Department	7	6	13	0	0	0	7	6	13
Herkimer	Frankfort Town Police Department	11	8	19	0	0	0	11	8	19
Jefferson	Jefferson County Sheriff	43	0	43	15	11	26	58	11	69
Jefferson	Watertown City Police Department	69	0	69	3	0	3	72	0	72
Jefferson	Adams Village Police Department	0	5	5	0	0	0	0	5	5
Jefferson	Alexandria Bay Village Police Department	1	11	12	0	0	0	1	11	12
Jefferson	Dexter Village Police Department	0	3	3	0	0	0	0	3	3
Jefferson	Glen Park Village Police Department	0	1	1	0	0	0	0	1	1
Jefferson	Cape Vincent Village Police Department	0	3	3	0	0	0	0	3	3
Jefferson	West Carthage Village Police Department	0	9	9	0	0	0	0	9	9
Jefferson	Clayton Village Police Department	3	3	6	0	1	1	3	4	7
Jefferson	Sackets Harbor Village Police Department	0	11	11	0	0	0	0	11	11
Jefferson	Black River Village Police Department	0	2	2	0	0	0	0	2	2
Jefferson	Theresa Village Police Department	0	4	4	0	0	0	0	4	4
Lewis	Lewis County Sheriff	25	2	27	1	1	2	26	3	29
Lewis	Lowville Village Police Department	6	5	11	0	0	0	6	5	11
Livingston	Livingston County Sheriff	66	28	94	33	5	38	99	33	132
Livingston	Avon Village Police Department	6	4	10	0	0	0	6	4	10
Livingston	Caledonia Village Police Department	1	11	12	0	0	0	1	11	12
Livingston	Geneseo Village Police Department	9	2	11	0	0	0	9	2	11
Livingston	Dansville Village Police Department	8	1	9	0	1	1	8	2	10
Livingston	SUNY Police - Geneseo	14	0	14	2	0	2	16	0	16
Madison	Madison County Sheriff	44	49	93	12	3	15	56	52	108
Madison	Oneida City Police Department	28	0	28	3	3	6	31	3	34
Madison	Cazenovia Village Police Department	5	8	13	1	7	8	6	15	21
Madison	Hamilton Village Police Department	3	9	12	0	1	1	3	10	13
Madison	Canastota Village Police Department	6	12	18	0	1	1	6	13	19
Madison	Chittenango Village Police Department	3	16	19	0	1	1	3	17	20
Madison	SUNY Police - Morrisville	13	0	13	2	2	4	15	2	17
Monroe	Monroe County Sheriff	346	73	419	76	21	97	422	94	516
Monroe	Rochester City Police Department	622	0	622	98	90	188	720	90	810
Monroe	Irondequoit Town Police Department	53	0	53	8	32	40	61	32	93
Monroe	East Rochester Village Police Department	7	7	14	1	0	1	8	7	15
Monroe	Fairport Village Police Department	8	0	8	1	0	1	9	0	9
Monroe	Brockport Village Police Department	13	0	13	1	1	2	14	1	15
Monroe	Brighton Town Police Department	40	5	45	4	4	8	44	9	53
Monroe	Gates Town Police Department	35	2	37	4	2	6	39	4	43
Monroe	Greece Town Police Department	93	0	93	14	2	16	107	2	109
Monroe	Ogden Town Police Department	13	1	14	3	2	5	16	3	19
Monroe	Webster Town and Village Police Department	36	0	36	5	2	7	41	2	43
Monroe	SUNY Police - Brockport	16	0	16	6	0	6	22	0	22
Montgomery	Montgomery County Sheriff	33	13	46	23	31	54	56	44	100
Montgomery	Amsterdam City Police Department	40	0	40	4	3	7	44	3	47
Montgomery	Canajoharie Village Police Department	6	8	14	0	0	0	6	8	14
Montgomery	Fort Plain Village Police Department	3	12	15	0	0	0	3	12	15
Montgomery	St Johnsville Village Police Department	3	9	12	0	0	0	3	9	12
Nassau	Nassau County Police Department	2,591	0	2,591	835	416	1,251	3,426	416	3,842
Nassau	Glen Cove City Police Department	58	0	58	5	13	18	63	13	76
Nassau	Long Beach City Police Department	75	0	75	18	14	32	93	14	107
Nassau	Floral Park Village Police Department	35	0	35	12	5	17	47	5	52
Nassau	Freeport Village Police Department	106	0	106	13	5	18	119	5	124
Nassau	Garden City Village Police Department	55	0	55	13	17	30	68	17	85
Nassau	Hempstead Village Police Department	128	0	128	28	1	29	156	1	157
Nassau	Lynbrook Village Police Department	50	0	50	8	27	35	58	27	85
Nassau	Rockville Centre Village Police Department	55	0	55	9	24	33	64	24	88
Nassau	Great Neck Estates Village Police Department	14	0	14	3	0	3	17	0	17
Nassau	Sands Point Village Police Department	20	0	20	0	0	0	20	0	20
Nassau	Malverne Village Police Department	22	0	22	0	3	3	22	3	25
Nassau	Kensington Village Police Department	6	0	6	0	0	0	6	0	6
Nassau	Old Westbury Village Police Department	28	0	28	5	1	6	33	1	34
Nassau	Kings Point Village Police Department	17	0	17	4	0	4	21	0	21
Nassau	Centre Island Village Police Department	7	0	7	0	0	0	7	0	7
Nassau	Port Washington Police District	65	0	65	8	10	18	73	10	83
Nassau	Lake Success Village Police Department	19	0	19	3	2	5	22	2	24
Nassau	Old Brookville Village Police Department	13	0	13	1	0	1	14	0	14
Nassau	Oyster Bay Cove Village Police Department	14	0	14	0	0	0	14	0	14
Nassau	Muttontown Village Police Department	16	0	16	0	0	0	16	0	16
Nassau	Brookville Village Police Department	18	0	18	0	2	2	18	2	20
Nassau	SUNY Police - Old Westbury	20	0	20	3	0	3	23	0	23
New York City	New York City Police Department	33,604	0	33,604	13,237	2,640	15,877	46,841	2,640	49,481
New York City	SUNY Police - Downstate Medical	27	0	27	73	0	73	100	0	100
New York City	SUNY Police - Optometry	9	0	9	8	0	8	17	0	17
New York City	SUNY Police - Maritime	9	0	9	4	0	4	13	0	13
Niagara	Niagara County Sheriff	114	2	116	67	0	67	181	2	183
Niagara	Lockport City Police Department	50	0	50	2	2	4	52	2	54
Niagara	North Tonawanda City Police Department	53	0	53	4	14	18	57	14	71
Niagara	Middleport Village Police Department	5	3	8	0	0	0	5	3	8
Niagara	Lewiston Town Police Department	17	13	30	1	0	1	18	13	31
Niagara	Niagara Town Police Department	10	17	27	1	0	1	11	17	28
Niagara	Somerset Town Police Department	0	10	10	0	0	0	0	10	10
Oneida	Oneida County Sheriff	126	89	215	11	8	19	137	97	234
Oneida	Rome City Police Department	68	21	89	3	1	4	71	22	93
Oneida	Utica City Police Department	152	0	152	15	5	20	167	5	172
Oneida	Boonville Village Police Department	1	4	5	0	0	0	1	4	5
Oneida	Camden Village Police Department	3	5	8	0	0	0	3	5	8
Oneida	Sherrill City Police Department	2	11	13	0	0	0	2	11	13
Oneida	Vernon Village Police Department	0	13	13	0	0	0	0	13	13
Oneida	Whitesboro Village Police Department	5	6	11	0	0	0	5	6	11
Oneida	Yorkville Village Police Department	5	12	17	0	0	0	5	12	17
Oneida	New York Mills Village Police Department	5	8	13	0	0	0	5	8	13
Oneida	New Hartford Town and Village Police Department	27	11	38	2	2	4	29	13	42
Oneida	Whitestown Town Police Department	7	9	16	0	0	0	7	9	16
Oneida	Kirkland Town Police Department	1	10	11	0	0	0	1	10	11
Oneida	SUNY Police - Polytechnic Institute	12	0	12	5	0	5	17	0	17
Onondaga	Onondaga County Sheriff	217	45	262	44	15	59	261	60	321
Onondaga	Syracuse City Police Department	375	0	375	74	97	171	449	97	546
Onondaga	Syracuse Regional Airport Authority Police	12	8	20	0	0	0	12	8	20
Onondaga	Jordan Village Police Department	0	7	7	0	1	1	0	8	8
Onondaga	Solvay Village Police Department	13	1	14	1	1	2	14	2	16
Onondaga	Baldwinsville Village Police Department	13	4	17	1	1	2	14	5	19
Onondaga	Manlius Town Police Department	38	5	43	4	3	7	42	8	50
Onondaga	Marcellus Village Police Department	9	10	19	0	1	1	9	11	20
Onondaga	Liverpool Village Police Department	8	2	10	0	1	1	8	3	11
Onondaga	Skaneateles Village Police Department	5	5	10	1	0	1	6	5	11
Onondaga	North Syracuse Village Police Department	10	6	16	1	1	2	11	7	18
Onondaga	Camillus Town and Village Police Department	29	11	40	2	2	4	31	13	44
Onondaga	Cicero Town Police Department	21	5	26	1	1	2	22	6	28
Onondaga	DeWitt Town Police Department	47	1	48	3	0	3	50	1	51
Onondaga	Geddes Town Police Department	26	3	29	3	1	4	29	4	33
Onondaga	SUNY Police - Environmental Science	7	0	7	4	0	4	11	0	11
Onondaga	SUNY Police - Upstate Medical	23	0	23	122	32	154	145	32	177
Onondaga	Onondaga County Park Rangers	0	24	24	0	1	1	0	25	25
Ontario	Ontario County Sheriff	86	24	110	27	2	29	113	26	139
Ontario	Geneva City Police Department	32	0	32	2	0	2	34	0	34
Ontario	Clifton Springs Village Police Department	0	2	2	0	0	0	0	2	2
Ontario	Phelps Village Police Department	0	6	6	0	1	1	0	7	7
Ontario	Canandaigua City Police Department	23	7	30	2	5	7	25	12	37
Orange	Orange County Sheriff	100	113	213	14	1	15	114	114	228
Orange	Middletown City Police Department	68	1	69	15	5	20	83	6	89
Orange	Newburgh City Police Department	66	0	66	19	24	43	85	24	109
Orange	Washingtonville Village Police Department	14	7	21	2	1	3	16	8	24
Orange	Chester Village Police Department	15	0	15	1	0	1	16	0	16
Orange	Cornwall-on-Hudson Village Police Department	3	9	12	0	2	2	3	11	14
Orange	Goshen Village Police Department	20	9	29	3	2	5	23	11	34
Orange	Monroe Village Police Department	20	4	24	3	8	11	23	12	35
Orange	Montgomery Village Police Department	6	12	18	1	1	2	7	13	20
Orange	Walden Village Police Department	15	12	27	3	8	11	18	20	38
Orange	Maybrook Village Police Department	4	13	17	0	0	0	4	13	17
Orange	Greenwood Lake Village Police Department	4	21	25	1	4	5	5	25	30
Orange	Florida Village Police Department	1	13	14	0	0	0	1	13	14
Orange	Port Jervis City Police Department	31	7	38	1	16	17	32	23	55
Orange	Tuxedo Park Village Police Department	3	16	19	1	0	1	4	16	20
Orange	Harriman Village Police Department	7	2	9	0	0	0	7	2	9
Orange	Mount Hope Town Police Department	2	16	18	1	0	1	3	16	19
Orange	Cornwall Town Police Department	11	5	16	2	1	3	13	6	19
Orange	Highlands Town Police Department	0	20	20	0	2	2	0	22	22
Orange	Newburgh Town Police Department	50	17	67	9	6	15	59	23	82
Orange	Tuxedo Town Police Department	10	6	16	0	0	0	10	6	16
Orange	New Windsor Town Police Department	45	0	45	13	6	19	58	6	64
Orange	Woodbury Town Police Department	20	14	34	4	7	11	24	21	45
Orange	Warwick Town Police Department	38	9	47	5	14	19	43	23	66
Orange	Deerpark Town Police Department	7	13	20	0	1	1	7	14	21
Orange	Blooming Grove Town Police Department	19	2	21	0	4	4	19	6	25
Orange	Montgomery Town Police Department	16	25	41	3	3	6	19	28	47
Orange	Crawford Town Police Department	11	17	28	2	6	8	13	23	36
Orange	Chester Town Police Department	16	7	23	1	0	1	17	7	24
Orange	Wallkill Town Police Department	54	9	63	6	22	28	60	31	91
Orange	Goshen Town Police Department	10	10	20	0	1	1	10	11	21
Orleans	Orleans County Sheriff	27	12	39	13	8	21	40	20	60
Orleans	Albion Village Police Department	12	1	13	1	1	2	13	2	15
Orleans	Holley Village Police Department	3	7	10	0	1	1	3	8	11
Orleans	Medina Village Police Department	9	0	9	1	0	1	10	0	10
Oswego	Oswego County Sheriff	78	46	124	11	0	11	89	46	135
Oswego	Fulton City Police Department	32	6	38	2	0	2	34	6	40
Oswego	Oswego City Police Department	54	5	59	7	1	8	61	6	67
Oswego	Central Square Village Police Department	6	12	18	0	0	0	6	12	18
Oswego	Pulaski Village Police Department	2	4	6	0	0	0	2	4	6
Oswego	Phoenix Village Police Department	0	19	19	0	0	0	0	19	19
Oswego	SUNY Police - Oswego	17	0	17	5	3	8	22	3	25
Otsego	Otsego County Sheriff	18	0	18	0	0	0	18	0	18
Otsego	Oneonta City Police Department	23	0	23	4	1	5	27	1	28
Otsego	Cooperstown Village Police Department	2	5	7	0	0	0	2	5	7
Otsego	SUNY Police - Oneonta	19	0	19	10	0	10	29	0	29
Putnam	Putnam County Sheriff	83	0	83	13	5	18	96	5	101
Putnam	Cold Spring Village Police Department	0	14	14	0	3	3	0	17	17
Putnam	Brewster Village Police Department	0	27	27	0	0	0	0	27	27
Putnam	Carmel Town Police Department	36	0	36	7	0	7	43	0	43
Putnam	Kent Town Police Department	19	0	19	5	0	5	24	0	24
Rensselaer	Rensselaer County Sheriff	42	0	42	7	0	7	49	0	49
Rensselaer	Rensselaer City Police Department	27	0	27	6	2	8	33	2	35
Rensselaer	Troy City Police Department	130	0	130	8	18	26	138	18	156
Rensselaer	Hoosick Falls Village Police Department	5	14	19	0	0	0	5	14	19
Rensselaer	Nassau Village Police Department	0	10	10	0	0	0	0	10	10
Rensselaer	East Greenbush Town Police Department	26	0	26	9	6	15	35	6	41
Rensselaer	North Greenbush Town Police Department	20	5	25	0	2	2	20	7	27
Rensselaer	Schodack Town Police Department	12	4	16	0	1	1	12	5	17
Rockland	Rockland County Sheriff	92	72	164	91	30	121	183	102	285
Rockland	Piermont Village Police Department	8	5	13	0	0	0	8	5	13
Rockland	Spring Valley Village Police Department	60	1	61	6	1	7	66	2	68
Rockland	Suffern Village Police Department	22	5	27	5	2	7	27	7	34
Rockland	Clarkstown Town Police Department	154	0	154	25	6	31	179	6	185
Rockland	Haverstraw Town Police Department	70	2	72	6	3	9	76	5	81
Rockland	Orangetown Town Police Department	87	0	87	8	0	8	95	0	95
Rockland	Ramapo Town Police Department	107	0	107	19	1	20	126	1	127
Rockland	Stony Point Town Police Department	28	1	29	1	4	5	29	5	34
St. Lawrence	St Lawrence County Sheriff	43	10	53	4	0	4	47	10	57
St. Lawrence	Ogdensburg City Police Department	23	0	23	2	0	2	25	0	25
St. Lawrence	Massena Village Police Department	23	0	23	5	0	5	28	0	28
St. Lawrence	Canton Village Police Department	10	0	10	1	4	5	11	4	15
St. Lawrence	Gouverneur Village Police Department	6	0	6	3	6	9	9	6	15
St. Lawrence	Norwood Village Police Department	0	7	7	0	0	0	0	7	7
St. Lawrence	Potsdam Village Police Department	14	2	16	4	3	7	18	5	23
St. Lawrence	Norfolk Town Police Department	0	8	8	0	0	0	0	8	8
St. Lawrence	SUNY Police - Canton	9	0	9	1	7	8	10	7	17
St. Lawrence	SUNY Police - Potsdam	11	0	11	3	11	14	14	11	25
Saratoga	Saratoga County Sheriff	178	21	199	0	0	0	178	21	199
Saratoga	Saratoga Springs City Police Department	78	0	78	16	0	16	94	0	94
Saratoga	Ballston Spa Village Police Department	4	14	18	0	0	0	4	14	18
Saratoga	Mechanicville City Police Department	7	11	18	0	0	0	7	11	18
Saratoga	South Glens Falls Village Police Department	4	10	14	0	2	2	4	12	16
Saratoga	Waterford Town and Village Police Department	10	0	10	1	2	3	11	2	13
Saratoga	Stillwater Town Police Department	0	15	15	0	1	1	0	16	16
Schenectady	Schenectady County Sheriff	33	9	42	0	0	0	33	9	42
Schenectady	Schenectady City Police Department	165	0	165	22	33	55	187	33	220
Schenectady	Scotia Village Police Department	14	4	18	1	1	2	15	5	20
Schenectady	Glenville Town Police Department	25	0	25	3	0	3	28	0	28
Schenectady	Niskayuna Town Police Department	31	0	31	3	3	6	34	3	37
Schenectady	Rotterdam Town Police Department	44	0	44	2	4	6	46	4	50
Schoharie	Schoharie County Sheriff	22	8	30	15	3	18	37	11	48
Schoharie	Cobleskill Village Police Department	3	8	11	0	1	1	3	9	12
Schoharie	Schoharie Village Police Department	0	5	5	0	1	1	0	6	6
Schoharie	SUNY Police - Cobleskill	8	0	8	1	0	1	9	0	9
Schuyler	Schuyler County Sheriff	16	8	24	2	4	6	18	12	30
Seneca	Seneca County Sheriff	33	8	41	4	0	4	37	8	45
Seneca	Seneca Falls Town Police Department	18	1	19	2	2	4	20	3	23
Seneca	Interlaken Village Police Department	0	3	3	0	0	0	0	3	3
Seneca	Waterloo Village Police Department	8	6	14	0	0	0	8	6	14
Steuben	Steuben County Sheriff	40	16	56	9	3	12	49	19	68
Steuben	Corning City Police Department	17	0	17	4	7	11	21	7	28
Steuben	Hornell City Police Department	23	0	23	1	0	1	24	0	24
Steuben	Addison Village Police Department	2	2	4	0	0	0	2	2	4
Steuben	Bath Village Police Department	12	5	17	1	1	2	13	6	19
Steuben	Canisteo Village Police Department	5	1	6	0	0	0	5	1	6
Steuben	Hammondsport Village Police Department	1	1	2	0	0	0	1	1	2
Steuben	Wayland Village Police Department	0	7	7	0	0	0	0	7	7
Steuben	North Hornell Village Police Department	0	7	7	0	0	0	0	7	7
Suffolk	Suffolk County Sheriff	309	0	309	131	3	134	440	3	443
Suffolk	Suffolk County Police Department	2,681	0	2,681	506	493	999	3,187	493	3,680
Suffolk	Amityville Village Police Department	25	0	25	1	0	1	26	0	26
Suffolk	Sag Harbor Village Police Department	14	1	15	1	0	1	15	1	16
Suffolk	Northport Village Police Department	19	4	23	4	1	5	23	5	28
Suffolk	Southampton Village Police Department	31	0	31	14	0	14	45	0	45
Suffolk	East Hampton Village Police Department	27	1	28	2	0	2	29	1	30
Suffolk	Ocean Beach Village Police Department	4	35	39	0	8	8	4	43	47
Suffolk	Huntington Bay Village Police Department	5	8	13	0	0	0	5	8	13
Suffolk	Lloyd Harbor Village Police Department	13	0	13	1	0	1	14	0	14
Suffolk	Quogue Village Police Department	14	6	20	0	0	0	14	6	20
Suffolk	Westhampton Beach Village Police Department	16	2	18	1	5	6	17	7	24
Suffolk	Nissequogue Village Police Department	0	23	23	0	0	0	0	23	23
Suffolk	Asharoken Village Police Department	1	18	19	0	0	0	1	18	19
Suffolk	East Hampton Town Police Department	69	5	74	30	2	32	99	7	106
Suffolk	Riverhead Town Police Department	100	10	110	21	15	36	121	25	146
Suffolk	Shelter Island Town Police Department	11	0	11	3	0	3	14	0	14
Suffolk	Southampton Town Police Department	108	24	132	39	27	66	147	51	198
Suffolk	Southold Town Police Department	53	0	53	22	9	31	75	9	84
Suffolk	SUNY Police - Farmingdale	26	0	26	9	0	9	35	0	35
Suffolk	SUNY Police - Stony Brook	71	0	71	99	5	104	170	5	175
Sullivan	Liberty Village Police Department	19	0	19	2	9	11	21	9	30
Sullivan	Monticello Village Police Department	18	0	18	3	0	3	21	0	21
Sullivan	Woodridge Village Police Department	0	9	9	0	0	0	0	9	9
Sullivan	Fallsburg Town Police Department	23	1	24	0	3	3	23	4	27
Tioga	Tioga County Sheriff	22	0	22	20	0	20	42	0	42
Tioga	Waverly Village Police Department	10	5	15	1	0	1	11	5	16
Tioga	Owego Village Police Department	5	17	22	1	1	2	6	18	24
Tompkins	Tompkins County Sheriff	48	1	49	6	0	6	54	1	55
Tompkins	Ithaca City Police Department	58	0	58	10	0	10	68	0	68
Tompkins	Groton Village Police Department	2	9	11	0	0	0	2	9	11
Tompkins	Trumansburg Village Police Department	2	9	11	0	6	6	2	15	17
Tompkins	Cayuga Heights Village Police Department	7	6	13	1	4	5	8	10	18
Tompkins	Cornell University Police	48	0	48	2	0	2	50	0	50
Tompkins	Ithaca College Police Department	19	1	20	16	0	16	35	1	36
Ulster	Ulster County Sheriff	73	14	87	39	8	47	112	22	134
Ulster	Kingston City Police Department	70	0	70	7	8	15	77	8	85
Ulster	Ellenville Village Police Department	9	9	18	1	7	8	10	16	26
Ulster	New Paltz Town and Village Police Department	23	3	26	4	5	9	27	8	35
Ulster	Lloyd Town Police Department	14	4	18	1	6	7	15	10	25
Ulster	Marlborough Town Police Department	8	15	23	3	9	12	11	24	35
Ulster	Plattekill Town Police Department	0	20	20	0	1	1	0	21	21
Ulster	Woodstock Town Police Department	10	11	21	0	0	0	10	11	21
Ulster	Saugerties Town Police Department	19	16	35	4	8	12	23	24	47
Ulster	Shandaken Town Police Department	3	11	14	0	0	0	3	11	14
Ulster	Rosendale Town Police Department	3	10	13	0	1	1	3	11	14
Ulster	Olive Town Police Department	0	10	10	0	0	0	0	10	10
Ulster	Shawangunk Town Police Department	3	13	16	0	4	4	3	17	20
Ulster	SUNY Police - New Paltz	21	0	21	4	0	4	25	0	25
Warren	Warren County Sheriff	75	19	94	37	20	57	112	39	151
Warren	Glens Falls City Police Department	28	0	28	3	0	3	31	0	31
Warren	Bolton Town Police Department	1	4	5	0	0	0	1	4	5
Washington	Washington County Sheriff	67	11	78	5	0	5	72	11	83
Washington	Cambridge Village Police Department	4	10	14	0	0	0	4	10	14
Washington	Greenwich Village Police Department	1	6	7	0	0	0	1	6	7
Washington	Granville Village Police Department	4	9	13	0	1	1	4	10	14
Washington	Hudson Falls Village Police Department	11	7	18	0	0	0	11	7	18
Wayne	Wayne County Sheriff	92	13	105	9	1	10	101	14	115
Wayne	Newark Village Police Department	15	1	16	1	1	2	16	2	18
Wayne	Clyde Village Police Department	0	5	5	1	0	1	1	5	6
Wayne	Palmyra Village Police Department	6	7	13	1	0	1	7	7	14
Wayne	Sodus Village Police Department	0	2	2	0	0	0	0	2	2
Wayne	Macedon Town and Village Police Department	7	6	13	1	0	1	8	6	14
Westchester	Westchester County Department of Public Safety	286	0	286	71	18	89	357	18	375
Westchester	Peekskill City Police Department	55	0	55	7	0	7	62	0	62
Westchester	White Plains City Police Department	206	0	206	17	23	40	223	23	246
Westchester	Mount Vernon City Police Department	163	0	163	47	0	47	210	0	210
Westchester	New Rochelle City Police Department	182	0	182	47	16	63	229	16	245
Westchester	Ossining Village Police Department	60	0	60	7	0	7	67	0	67
Westchester	Port Chester Village Police Department	60	0	60	1	6	7	61	6	67
Westchester	Yonkers City Police Department	625	0	625	85	40	125	710	40	750
Westchester	Mamaroneck Village Police Department	51	12	63	9	2	11	60	14	74
Westchester	Scarsdale Village Police Department	45	0	45	7	23	30	52	23	75
Westchester	Bronxville Village Police Department	21	0	21	0	4	4	21	4	25
Westchester	Tuckahoe Village Police Department	22	0	22	4	5	9	26	5	31
Westchester	Ardsley Village Police Department	20	0	20	0	3	3	20	3	23
Westchester	Dobbs Ferry Village Police Department	27	0	27	1	5	6	28	5	33
Westchester	Hastings-on-Hudson Village Police Department	20	0	20	0	0	0	20	0	20
Westchester	Irvington Village Police Department	22	0	22	2	3	5	24	3	27
Westchester	Tarrytown Village Police Department	33	0	33	4	2	6	37	2	39
Westchester	Larchmont Village Police Department	25	0	25	1	0	1	26	0	26
Westchester	Briarcliff Manor Village Police Department	20	0	20	0	0	0	20	0	20
Westchester	Pleasantville Village Police Department	23	0	23	0	0	0	23	0	23
Westchester	Pelham Village Police Department	23	0	23	2	9	11	25	9	34
Westchester	Pelham Manor Village Police Department	24	0	24	0	7	7	24	7	31
Westchester	Elmsford Village Police Department	21	0	21	3	3	6	24	3	27
Westchester	Buchanan Village Police Department	6	0	6	0	0	0	6	0	6
Westchester	Somers Town Police Department	0	16	16	0	1	1	0	17	17
Westchester	Bedford Town Police Department	37	0	37	5	4	9	42	4	46
Westchester	Eastchester Town Police Department	48	5	53	2	0	2	50	5	55
Westchester	Greenburgh Town Police Department	118	0	118	35	9	44	153	9	162
Westchester	Harrison Town Police Department	69	0	69	11	15	26	80	15	95
Westchester	Lewisboro Town Police Department	6	16	22	0	0	0	6	16	22
Westchester	Mamaroneck Town Police Department	36	0	36	1	18	19	37	18	55
Westchester	Mount Pleasant Town Police Department	51	0	51	7	12	19	58	12	70
Westchester	New Castle Town Police Department	38	0	38	3	5	8	41	5	46
Westchester	North Castle Town Police Department	31	0	31	1	0	1	32	0	32
Westchester	Pound Ridge Town Police Department	0	24	24	1	2	3	1	26	27
Westchester	Yorktown Town Police Department	57	0	57	7	0	7	64	0	64
Westchester	Rye Brook Village Police Department	27	0	27	1	0	1	28	0	28
Westchester	SUNY Police - Purchase	22	0	22	8	0	8	30	0	30
Wyoming	Wyoming County Sheriff	32	6	38	14	6	20	46	12	58
Wyoming	Arcade Village Police Department	7	4	11	0	4	4	7	8	15
Wyoming	Attica Village Police Department	5	7	12	0	4	4	5	11	16
Wyoming	Perry Village Police Department	6	10	16	0	2	2	6	12	18
Wyoming	Warsaw Village Police Department	5	10	15	0	0	0	5	10	15
Yates	Yates County Sheriff	27	5	32	18	5	23	45	10	55
Yates	Penn Yan Village Police Department	14	5	19	1	0	1	15	5	20
Multiple County	Metropolitan Transportation Authority	1,287	0	1,287	63	0	63	1,350	0	1,350
Multiple County	New York State Regional Park Police	269	0	269	47	39	86	316	39	355
Multiple County	New York City Department of Environmental Protection Police - Ashokan Precinct	193	0	193	30	0	30	223	0	223
Statewide	New York State Police	5,373	0	5,373	1,208	0	1,208	6,581	0	6,581

== Capital punishment laws ==
Capital punishment is not applied in this state, but in the past it was. The last execution took place in 1963, when Eddie Mays was electrocuted at Sing Sing Prison. The state was the first to adopt the electric chair as a method of execution, which replaced hanging. Following the U.S. Supreme Court's ruling declaring existing capital punishment statutes unconstitutional in Furman v. Georgia (1972), New York was without a death penalty until 1995, when then-Governor George Pataki signed a new statute into law, which provided for execution by lethal injection. In June 2004, the state's highest court ruled in People v. LaValle that the state's death penalty statute violated the state constitution.

== Human trafficking ==
New York has one of the highest rates of human trafficking in the country, partially due to its large immigrant population and status as a major port of entry. According to a 2011 Department of State report, New York, together with California, Texas, and Oklahoma, has the largest concentrations of survivors of human trafficking.

== See also ==
- Law of New York
- List of shootings in New York (state)
