= United States cities by crime rate (100,000–250,000) =

The following table is based on Federal Bureau of Investigation Uniform Crime Reports statistics.

The population numbers are based on U.S. Census estimates for the year end. The number of murders includes nonnegligent manslaughter. This list is based on the reporting agency. In most cases, the city and the reporting agency are identical. However, the population in the respective city is sometimes smaller than that of the territory covered by its police department.

Murder is the only statistic that all agencies are required to report. Consequently, some agencies do not report all the crimes. If components are missing the total is adjusted to "0."

== Note about population ==
Data are voluntarily submitted by each jurisdiction and some jurisdictions do not appear in the table because they either did not submit data or they did not meet deadlines.

The FBI document on the UCR methodology has the following disclaimer on population estimates:

For population estimates, the FBI computed individual rates of growth from one year to the next for every city/town and county using the current decennial counts through the most recent population estimates available from the U.S. Census Bureau. Each agency’s rates of growth were averaged; that average was then applied and added to its most recent Census population estimate to derive the agency’s current year population estimate. Population totals for 2010 are from the U.S. Census Bureau’s decennial population counts.

== 2024 Calendar Year Ratios of Crime Per 100,000 Population ==
Rates are based on cases per 100,000 for all of calendar 2024.

| State | City | Popul. | Yearly Crime Rates per 100,000 people | | | | | | | | | | |
| State | City | Popul. | Total | Violent crime | | | | | Arson^{1} | Property crime | | | |
| State | City | Popul. | Total | Murder and Nonnegligent manslaughter | Rape | Robbery | Aggravated assault | Total | Arson^{1} | Burglary | Larceny theft | Motor vehicle theft | Total |
|---|---|---|---|---|---|---|---|---|---|---|---|---|---|
| Alabama | Birmingham | 195,418 | 5330.62 | 58.85 | 14.84 | 201.11 | 971.76 | 1246.56 | 52.71 | 729.72 | 2493.63 | 808.01 | 4031.36 |
| Alabama | Huntsville | 228,697 | 2878.92 | 8.31 | 48.54 | 53.78 | 372.55 | 483.17 | 7.43 | 321.39 | 1808.94 | 257.98 | 2388.31 |
| Alabama | Mobile | 237,092 | 2429.86 | 16.45 | 26.15 | 52.72 | 656.71 | 752.03 | 3.37 | 313.38 | 1188.57 | 172.51 | 1674.46 |
| Alabama | Montgomery | 193,728 | 2830.26 | 18.07 | 6.19 | 191.51 | 378.88 | 594.65 | 0.52 | 527.03 | 1341.06 | 367.01 | 2235.09 |
| Alabama | Tuscaloosa | 113,834 | 3289.00 | 15.81 | 17.57 | 59.74 | 460.32 | 553.44 | 4.39 | 318.89 | 2159.28 | 253.00 | 2731.17 |
| Arizona | Buckeye | 114,513 | 938.76 | 2.62 | 50.65 | 7.86 | 105.66 | 166.79 | 0.87 | 87.33 | 570.24 | 113.52 | 771.09 |
| Arizona | Goodyear | 116,892 | 1653.66 | 0.00 | 14.54 | 12.83 | 154.84 | 182.22 | 8.55 | 138.59 | 1165.18 | 159.12 | 1462.89 |
| Arizona | Peoria | 201,056 | 1468.75 | 1.49 | 43.27 | 24.37 | 185.52 | 254.66 | 8.95 | 150.70 | 906.71 | 147.72 | 1205.14 |
| Arizona | Scottsdale | 245,237 | 2030.69 | 0.41 | 33.84 | 22.02 | 96.23 | 152.51 | 2.85 | 182.27 | 1534.84 | 158.21 | 1875.33 |
| Arizona | Surprise | 163,202 | 992.02 | 7.35 | 16.54 | 11.03 | 74.14 | 109.07 | 7.35 | 94.36 | 681.98 | 99.26 | 875.60 |
| Arizona | Tempe | 191,376 | 3371.37 | 2.61 | 71.59 | 66.36 | 329.72 | 470.28 | 7.32 | 334.42 | 2257.86 | 301.50 | 2893.78 |
| Arizona | Yuma | 101,989 | 1686.46 | 2.94 | 43.14 | 23.53 | 353.96 | 423.58 | 15.69 | 197.08 | 888.33 | 161.78 | 1247.19 |
| Arkansas | Fayetteville | 104,089 | 2796.65 | 7.69 | 52.84 | 26.90 | 336.25 | 423.68 | 1.92 | 228.65 | 1944.49 | 197.91 | 2371.05 |
| Arkansas | Little Rock | 204,247 | 6916.14 | 17.63 | 115.06 | 217.87 | 1321.44 | 1672.00 | 29.87 | 937.10 | 3823.80 | 453.37 | 5214.27 |
| California | Antioch | 117,675 | 3814.74 | 13.60 | 39.09 | 185.26 | 368.81 | 606.76 | 14.45 | 466.54 | 1363.08 | 1363.93 | 3193.54 |
| California | Berkeley | 117,400 | 5908.86 | 5.96 | 46.00 | 186.54 | 400.34 | 638.84 | 40.89 | 660.99 | 3655.88 | 912.27 | 5229.13 |
| California | Burbank | 101,377 | 3486.00 | 1.97 | 11.84 | 94.70 | 282.12 | 390.62 | 23.67 | 342.29 | 2436.45 | 292.97 | 3071.70 |
| California | Carlsbad | 113,023 | 1717.35 | 0.88 | 6.19 | 34.51 | 157.49 | 199.07 | 7.08 | 236.24 | 1166.13 | 108.83 | 1511.20 |
| California | Chico | 100,831 | 2612.29 | 1.98 | 137.85 | 82.32 | 477.04 | 699.19 | 14.88 | 208.27 | 1486.65 | 203.31 | 1898.23 |
| California | Clovis | 127,560 | 1919.88 | 1.57 | 29.79 | 35.28 | 177.96 | 244.59 | 9.41 | 147.38 | 1343.68 | 174.82 | 1665.88 |
| California | Concord | 121,341 | 3430.83 | 2.47 | 41.21 | 144.22 | 296.68 | 484.58 | 60.16 | 424.42 | 1945.76 | 515.90 | 2886.08 |
| California | Corona | 161,174 | 1982.33 | 1.24 | 27.30 | 63.29 | 157.59 | 249.42 | 9.31 | 243.84 | 1271.92 | 207.85 | 1723.60 |
| California | Costa Mesa | 107,235 | 3601.44 | 2.80 | 61.55 | 74.60 | 598.69 | 737.63 | 27.04 | 371.15 | 2183.06 | 282.56 | 2836.76 |
| California | El Cajon | 101,983 | 1952.29 | 0.00 | 26.48 | 105.90 | 302.01 | 434.39 | 17.65 | 153.95 | 1083.51 | 262.79 | 1500.25 |
| California | Elk Grove | 179,074 | 1426.78 | 1.68 | 20.66 | 50.26 | 117.27 | 189.87 | 5.03 | 110.57 | 996.24 | 125.09 | 1231.89 |
| California | El Monte | 102,088 | 2489.03 | 5.88 | 31.35 | 162.60 | 223.34 | 423.16 | 13.71 | 388.88 | 1186.23 | 477.04 | 2052.15 |
| California | Escondido | 147,170 | 1935.86 | 1.36 | 17.67 | 112.12 | 302.37 | 433.51 | 16.99 | 222.87 | 1050.49 | 212.00 | 1485.36 |
| California | Fairfield | 121,082 | 2217.51 | 0.83 | 40.47 | 117.28 | 339.44 | 498.01 | 33.86 | 213.90 | 1234.70 | 237.03 | 1685.63 |
| California | Fontana | 217,605 | 1492.15 | 0.92 | 22.06 | 56.06 | 191.17 | 270.21 | 5.51 | 146.60 | 794.10 | 275.73 | 1216.42 |
| California | Fremont | 224,820 | 2541.59 | 2.67 | 16.01 | 64.50 | 112.53 | 195.71 | 18.24 | 342.94 | 1444.71 | 539.99 | 2327.64 |
| California | Fullerton | 137,942 | 2493.08 | 0.72 | 32.62 | 90.62 | 331.30 | 455.26 | 13.77 | 326.95 | 1486.86 | 210.23 | 2024.04 |
| California | Garden Grove | 167,041 | 2049.80 | 0.60 | 14.97 | 65.85 | 195.16 | 276.58 | 14.37 | 307.71 | 1175.16 | 275.98 | 1758.85 |
| California | Glendale | 184,180 | 2331.96 | 2.17 | 18.46 | 93.39 | 173.20 | 287.22 | 17.92 | 201.98 | 1594.64 | 230.21 | 2026.82 |
| California | Hayward | 153,419 | 4155.94 | 7.82 | 46.93 | 174.03 | 248.34 | 477.12 | 22.16 | 364.36 | 1915.67 | 1376.62 | 3656.65 |
| California | Hesperia | 100,850 | 1970.25 | 7.93 | 36.69 | 90.23 | 384.73 | 519.58 | 24.79 | 321.27 | 568.17 | 536.44 | 1425.88 |
| California | Huntington Beach | 190,081 | 2212.74 | 2.63 | 34.72 | 51.03 | 118.90 | 207.28 | 16.31 | 200.97 | 1644.04 | 144.15 | 1989.15 |
| California | Inglewood | 101,399 | 4314.64 | 6.90 | 45.37 | 264.30 | 357.99 | 674.56 | 25.64 | 296.85 | 2451.70 | 865.89 | 3614.43 |
| California | Jurupa Valley | 107,986 | 2710.54 | 3.70 | 8.33 | 62.05 | 110.20 | 184.28 | 7.41 | 312.08 | 1553.91 | 652.86 | 2518.85 |
| California | Lancaster | 164,012 | 2787.60 | 17.68 | 46.95 | 171.94 | 598.13 | 834.70 | 32.31 | 384.73 | 683.49 | 852.38 | 1920.59 |
| California | Menifee | 117,055 | 983.30 | 0.85 | 24.77 | 23.92 | 133.27 | 182.82 | 1.71 | 93.97 | 554.44 | 150.36 | 798.77 |
| California | Modesto | 218,990 | 3128.00 | 3.20 | 56.17 | 113.25 | 483.13 | 655.74 | 57.54 | 267.14 | 1818.80 | 328.78 | 2414.72 |
| California | Moreno Valley | 213,581 | 1940.25 | 3.28 | 8.90 | 85.21 | 175.11 | 272.50 | 1.87 | 234.10 | 1171.92 | 259.85 | 1665.88 |
| California | Murrieta | 112,125 | 1140.69 | 0.89 | 27.65 | 34.78 | 120.40 | 183.72 | 13.38 | 134.67 | 699.22 | 109.70 | 943.59 |
| California | Oceanside | 168,725 | 2143.72 | 2.37 | 30.23 | 85.35 | 340.79 | 458.73 | 13.04 | 308.19 | 1164.02 | 199.73 | 1671.95 |
| California | Ontario | 184,763 | 2102.15 | 2.16 | 43.84 | 77.40 | 148.84 | 272.24 | 12.45 | 238.68 | 1113.32 | 465.46 | 1817.46 |
| California | Orange | 137,970 | 1524.97 | 0.00 | 12.32 | 76.83 | 136.99 | 226.14 | 10.87 | 357.32 | 703.05 | 227.59 | 1287.96 |
| California | Oxnard | 197,361 | 2500.49 | 3.04 | 32.93 | 118.56 | 441.83 | 596.37 | 26.85 | 200.65 | 1315.36 | 361.27 | 1877.27 |
| California | Palmdale | 158,983 | 2440.51 | 5.66 | 28.30 | 151.59 | 365.45 | 551.00 | 24.53 | 250.97 | 1095.71 | 518.29 | 1864.98 |
| California | Pasadena | 131,966 | 3203.10 | 0.76 | 33.34 | 119.73 | 326.60 | 480.43 | 25.76 | 556.96 | 1864.87 | 275.07 | 2696.91 |
| California | Pomona | 143,726 | 3488.58 | 8.35 | 42.44 | 217.78 | 447.38 | 715.95 | 19.48 | 420.24 | 1740.12 | 592.79 | 2753.16 |
| California | Rancho Cucamonga | 174,313 | 2115.73 | 1.15 | 20.65 | 63.68 | 208.25 | 293.72 | 10.90 | 273.07 | 1316.60 | 221.44 | 1811.11 |
| California | Rialto | 103,164 | 3065.02 | 1.94 | 43.62 | 124.07 | 472.06 | 641.70 | 28.11 | 304.37 | 1693.42 | 397.43 | 2395.22 |
| California | Richmond | 113,418 | 3714.58 | 7.94 | 21.16 | 231.00 | 663.03 | 923.13 | 29.10 | 128.73 | 1653.18 | 980.44 | 2762.35 |
| California | Roseville | 162,841 | 1656.83 | 1.23 | 37.46 | 68.78 | 111.77 | 219.23 | 17.19 | 138.79 | 1178.45 | 103.17 | 1420.40 |
| California | Salinas | 158,233 | 2227.73 | 3.79 | 51.19 | 140.93 | 328.63 | 524.54 | 27.81 | 146.62 | 1158.42 | 370.34 | 1675.38 |
| California | San Bernardino | 224,283 | 3817.94 | 11.15 | 49.94 | 241.21 | 594.78 | 897.08 | 23.18 | 455.23 | 1677.35 | 765.10 | 2897.68 |
| California | Santa Clara | 131,901 | 2693.69 | 1.52 | 19.71 | 57.62 | 103.11 | 181.95 | 9.86 | 337.37 | 1771.03 | 393.48 | 2501.88 |
| California | Santa Clarita | 221,303 | 1351.54 | 0.90 | 12.65 | 42.48 | 109.35 | 165.38 | 9.49 | 195.66 | 782.19 | 198.82 | 1176.67 |
| California | Santa Maria | 110,056 | 2611.40 | 2.73 | 68.15 | 173.55 | 416.15 | 660.57 | 68.15 | 312.57 | 1149.41 | 420.69 | 1882.68 |
| California | Santa Rosa | 175,147 | 1677.45 | 1.14 | 67.37 | 66.80 | 207.25 | 342.57 | 14.84 | 231.23 | 919.23 | 169.57 | 1320.03 |
| California | Simi Valley | 124,707 | 1059.28 | 2.41 | 15.24 | 24.86 | 86.60 | 129.10 | 6.42 | 124.29 | 714.47 | 85.00 | 923.77 |
| California | Sunnyvale | 150,893 | 2175.71 | 0.66 | 27.17 | 57.66 | 159.05 | 244.54 | 21.87 | 306.84 | 1317.49 | 284.97 | 1909.30 |
| California | Temecula | 110,880 | 1836.22 | 0.00 | 12.63 | 45.09 | 93.80 | 151.52 | 5.41 | 229.98 | 1276.15 | 173.16 | 1679.29 |
| California | Thousand Oaks | 122,363 | 1126.16 | 2.45 | 6.54 | 18.80 | 74.37 | 102.16 | 3.27 | 125.04 | 839.31 | 56.39 | 1020.73 |
| California | Torrance | 136,899 | 3095.71 | 0.00 | 27.03 | 115.41 | 168.74 | 311.18 | 8.77 | 479.19 | 1819.59 | 476.99 | 2775.77 |
| California | Vacaville | 102,672 | 2054.11 | 0.97 | 41.88 | 53.57 | 196.74 | 293.17 | 21.43 | 152.91 | 1380.12 | 206.48 | 1739.52 |
| California | Vallejo | 121,795 | 4755.53 | 16.42 | 53.37 | 245.49 | 424.48 | 739.77 | 25.45 | 556.67 | 2646.25 | 787.39 | 3990.31 |
| California | Ventura | 108,543 | 2633.06 | 2.76 | 46.06 | 82.92 | 279.15 | 410.90 | 16.58 | 265.33 | 1733.88 | 206.37 | 2205.58 |
| California | Victorville | 140,309 | 3192.24 | 7.84 | 63.43 | 170.34 | 774.01 | 1015.62 | 47.75 | 354.22 | 1154.59 | 620.06 | 2128.87 |
| California | Visalia | 146,090 | 2586.08 | 4.79 | 67.77 | 94.46 | 268.33 | 435.35 | 20.54 | 262.85 | 1518.93 | 348.42 | 2130.19 |
| California | West Covina | 104,467 | 2350.98 | 2.87 | 16.27 | 72.75 | 147.41 | 239.31 | 13.40 | 295.79 | 1446.39 | 356.09 | 2098.27 |
| Colorado | Arvada | 120,456 | 2804.34 | 0.00 | 20.75 | 46.49 | 218.34 | 285.58 | 39.85 | 343.69 | 1759.98 | 375.24 | 2478.91 |
| Colorado | Boulder | 105,195 | 3085.70 | 0.00 | 35.17 | 44.68 | 242.41 | 322.26 | 30.42 | 383.10 | 2141.74 | 208.18 | 2733.02 |
| Colorado | Centennial | 106,454 | 1903.17 | 0.00 | 8.45 | 20.67 | 143.72 | 172.84 | 21.61 | 281.81 | 1146.03 | 280.87 | 1708.72 |
| Colorado | Fort Collins | 170,509 | 2442.10 | 1.76 | 22.87 | 24.63 | 223.45 | 272.71 | 14.08 | 228.73 | 1742.43 | 184.15 | 2155.31 |
| Colorado | Greeley | 113,757 | 3715.82 | 5.27 | 43.95 | 65.05 | 556.45 | 670.73 | 25.49 | 341.96 | 2171.29 | 506.34 | 3019.59 |
| Colorado | Lakewood | 155,868 | 5899.86 | 2.57 | 59.67 | 137.94 | 587.04 | 787.20 | 19.25 | 588.32 | 3732.00 | 773.09 | 5093.41 |
| Colorado | Pueblo | 110,805 | 6416.68 | 17.15 | 144.40 | 219.30 | 1043.27 | 1424.12 | 50.54 | 846.53 | 2913.23 | 1182.26 | 4942.02 |
| Colorado | Thornton | 145,847 | 3129.31 | 1.37 | 79.54 | 49.37 | 143.30 | 273.57 | 19.88 | 277.00 | 2067.92 | 490.93 | 2835.85 |
| Colorado | Westminster | 114,310 | 3872.80 | 5.25 | 42.87 | 80.48 | 174.96 | 303.56 | 28.87 | 349.05 | 2466.98 | 724.35 | 3540.37 |
| Connecticut | Bridgeport | 148,132 | 1861.85 | 8.10 | 41.85 | 153.24 | 189.70 | 392.89 | 0.00 | 224.12 | 771.61 | 473.23 | 1468.96 |
| Connecticut | Hartford | 119,626 | 3384.72 | 17.55 | 42.63 | 136.26 | 319.33 | 515.77 | 23.41 | 223.20 | 1740.42 | 881.92 | 2845.54 |
| Connecticut | New Haven | 137,243 | 4132.09 | 10.93 | 32.06 | 180.70 | 311.13 | 534.82 | 10.20 | 377.43 | 2402.31 | 807.33 | 3587.07 |
| Connecticut | Stamford | 136,483 | 1385.52 | 0.73 | 10.99 | 37.37 | 108.44 | 157.53 | 2.93 | 151.67 | 890.22 | 183.17 | 1225.06 |
| Connecticut | Waterbury | 115,363 | 3244.54 | 6.93 | 44.21 | 104.89 | 166.43 | 322.46 | 3.47 | 229.71 | 2054.38 | 634.52 | 2918.61 |
| Florida^{3} | Boca Raton | 100,557 | 1848.70 | 1.99 | 35.80 | 33.81 | 99.45 | 171.05 | 0.99 | 155.14 | 1421.08 | 100.44 | 1676.66 |
| Florida^{3} | Coral Springs | 135,157 | 1231.16 | 2.96 | 26.64 | 19.98 | 87.31 | 136.88 | 0.74 | 81.39 | 987.00 | 25.16 | 1093.54 |
| Florida^{3} | Gainesville | 147,022 | 3450.50 | 4.76 | 85.70 | 133.31 | 514.21 | 737.98 | 8.84 | 307.44 | 2292.85 | 103.39 | 2703.68 |
| Florida^{3} | Miami Gardens | 110,466 | 2852.46 | 11.77 | 19.92 | 73.33 | 309.60 | 414.61 | 8.15 | 146.65 | 1924.57 | 358.48 | 2429.71 |
| Florida^{3} | Palm Bay | 141,137 | 1366.76 | 7.79 | 47.47 | 51.72 | 240.19 | 347.18 | 2.13 | 229.56 | 724.83 | 63.06 | 1017.45 |
| Florida^{3} | West Palm Beach | 126,427 | 2726.47 | 7.91 | 59.32 | 158.99 | 349.61 | 575.83 | 12.66 | 307.69 | 1801.83 | 28.47 | 2137.99 |
| Georgia | Athens-Clarke County | 129,765 | 2695.64 | 3.85 | 43.93 | 40.84 | 317.50 | 406.12 | 13.10 | 223.48 | 1884.18 | 168.77 | 2276.42 |
| Georgia | Columbus | 201,061 | 2842.42 | 12.93 | 25.37 | 50.73 | 514.77 | 603.80 | 2.98 | 353.62 | 1635.82 | 246.19 | 2235.64 |
| Georgia | Sandy Springs | 105,580 | 1600.68 | 0.95 | 22.73 | 15.15 | 100.40 | 139.23 | 0.95 | 197.95 | 1119.53 | 143.02 | 1460.50 |
| Georgia | Savannah | 241,780 | 20.27 | 9.51 | 10.34 | 0.00 | 0.41 | 20.27 | 0.00 | 0.00 | 0.00 | 0.00 | 0.00 |
| Georgia | South Fulton | 112,441 | 2392.37 | 22.23 | 19.57 | 63.14 | 365.53 | 470.47 | 14.23 | 217.89 | 1268.22 | 421.55 | 1907.67 |
| Idaho | Boise | 235,223 | 1415.68 | 1.28 | 71.00 | 15.73 | 205.76 | 293.76 | 11.90 | 107.13 | 872.79 | 130.09 | 1110.01 |
| Idaho | Meridian | 140,353 | 722.46 | 0.71 | 29.92 | 10.69 | 105.45 | 146.77 | 4.27 | 52.01 | 482.36 | 37.05 | 571.42 |
| Idaho | Nampa | 118,950 | 1101.30 | 2.52 | 77.34 | 15.13 | 258.09 | 353.09 | 5.88 | 151.32 | 508.62 | 82.39 | 742.33 |
| Illinois | Aurora | 176,688 | 1521.89 | 0.57 | 56.60 | 36.22 | 172.62 | 266.01 | 3.96 | 253.55 | 739.16 | 259.21 | 1251.92 |
| Illinois | Elgin | 112,879 | 1372.27 | 4.43 | 64.67 | 31.01 | 166.55 | 266.66 | 3.54 | 211.73 | 804.40 | 85.93 | 1102.07 |
| Illinois | Joliet | 150,569 | 1601.26 | 0.00 | 48.48 | 35.20 | 266.32 | 350.01 | 6.64 | 389.85 | 704.00 | 150.76 | 1244.61 |
| Illinois | Naperville | 150,521 | 967.97 | 0.66 | 29.90 | 15.28 | 37.87 | 83.71 | 0.66 | 65.77 | 755.38 | 62.45 | 883.60 |
| Illinois | Peoria | 109,677 | 5678.49 | 12.76 | 152.27 | 127.65 | 1052.18 | 1344.86 | 49.24 | 1441.51 | 2066.07 | 776.83 | 4284.40 |
| Illinois | Rockford | 145,280 | 3627.48 | 13.08 | 69.52 | 106.69 | 890.69 | 1079.98 | 30.29 | 632.57 | 1444.80 | 439.84 | 2517.21 |
| Illinois | Springfield | 111,965 | 5844.68 | 8.04 | 106.28 | 133.97 | 652.88 | 901.17 | 32.15 | 1524.58 | 2813.38 | 573.39 | 4911.36 |
| Indiana | Carmel | 103,107 | 881.61 | 0.00 | 12.61 | 5.82 | 47.52 | 65.95 | 2.91 | 45.58 | 680.85 | 86.32 | 812.75 |
| Indiana | Evansville | 114,660 | 4911.04 | 10.47 | 86.34 | 56.69 | 1052.68 | 1206.17 | 26.16 | 514.56 | 2821.38 | 342.75 | 3678.70 |
| Indiana | Fishers | 105,680 | 732.40 | 0.95 | 10.41 | 5.68 | 55.83 | 72.86 | 0.95 | 30.28 | 557.34 | 70.97 | 658.59 |
| Indiana | South Bend | 103,415 | 3032.44 | 2.90 | 57.05 | 67.69 | 837.40 | 965.04 | 23.21 | 230.14 | 1379.88 | 434.17 | 2044.19 |
| Iowa | Cedar Rapids | 135,363 | 2957.23 | 0.74 | 11.08 | 30.29 | 219.41 | 261.52 | 6.65 | 274.08 | 2202.97 | 212.02 | 2689.07 |
| Iowa | Des Moines | 209,245 | 3845.73 | 4.30 | 51.14 | 75.03 | 572.53 | 703.00 | 16.25 | 462.62 | 2141.99 | 521.88 | 3126.48 |
| Kansas | Kansas City | 153,363 | 4655.62 | 12.39 | 67.81 | 93.89 | 873.09 | 1047.19 | 1.96 | 442.74 | 2271.73 | 892.00 | 3606.48 |
| Kansas | Olathe | 149,473 | 1141.34 | 2.01 | 34.12 | 10.04 | 149.86 | 196.02 | 4.01 | 64.89 | 772.71 | 103.70 | 941.31 |
| Kansas | Overland Park | 196,875 | 1950.98 | 0.00 | 20.83 | 19.30 | 144.25 | 184.38 | 5.08 | 111.75 | 1385.65 | 264.13 | 1761.52 |
| Kansas | Topeka | 125,156 | 4516.76 | 15.98 | 47.14 | 80.70 | 712.71 | 856.53 | 17.58 | 637.60 | 2504.87 | 500.18 | 3642.65 |
| Louisiana | Lafayette | 121,471 | 5415.28 | 14.82 | 33.75 | 69.15 | 948.37 | 1066.10 | 1.65 | 661.06 | 3227.93 | 458.55 | 4347.54 |
| Louisiana | Shreveport | 175,092 | 5233.25 | 26.84 | 83.38 | 79.96 | 1038.31 | 1228.50 | 14.28 | 781.30 | 2628.90 | 580.27 | 3990.47 |
| Massachusetts | Brockton | 106,650 | 1959.68 | 7.50 | 63.76 | 67.51 | 460.38 | 599.16 | 15.00 | 233.47 | 751.05 | 360.99 | 1345.52 |
| Massachusetts | Cambridge | 120,447 | 3093.48 | 0.00 | 34.04 | 91.33 | 311.34 | 436.71 | 12.45 | 236.62 | 2323.01 | 84.68 | 2644.32 |
| Massachusetts | Lowell | 116,062 | 2206.58 | 4.31 | 6.89 | 56.87 | 464.41 | 532.47 | 11.20 | 149.92 | 1309.64 | 203.34 | 1662.90 |
| Massachusetts | Lynn | 103,200 | 1750.97 | 2.91 | 32.95 | 75.58 | 463.18 | 574.61 | 5.81 | 202.52 | 783.91 | 184.11 | 1170.54 |
| Massachusetts | New Bedford | 102,491 | 1719.18 | 6.83 | 43.91 | 78.06 | 224.41 | 353.20 | 6.83 | 184.41 | 930.81 | 243.92 | 1359.14 |
| Massachusetts | Quincy | 103,550 | 1669.72 | 0.00 | 28.97 | 24.14 | 281.99 | 335.10 | 1.93 | 148.72 | 1036.21 | 147.75 | 1332.69 |
| Massachusetts | Springfield | 155,491 | 3755.84 | 10.93 | 46.95 | 209.02 | 624.47 | 891.37 | 28.94 | 313.84 | 1856.70 | 664.99 | 2835.53 |
| Massachusetts | Worcester | 212,425 | 16.48 | 7.53 | 0.00 | 0.94 | 8.00 | 16.48 | 0.00 | 0.00 | 0.00 | 0.00 | 0.00 |
| Michigan | Ann Arbor | 118,025 | 2024.15 | 0.00 | 49.14 | 20.33 | 233.00 | 302.48 | 5.93 | 156.75 | 1471.72 | 87.27 | 1715.74 |
| Michigan | Dearborn | 104,571 | 2307.52 | 0.96 | 25.82 | 36.34 | 229.51 | 292.62 | 15.30 | 112.84 | 1422.96 | 463.80 | 1999.60 |
| Michigan | Grand Rapids | 195,913 | 3416.31 | 6.13 | 89.84 | 116.38 | 697.76 | 910.10 | 25.52 | 267.47 | 1828.87 | 384.35 | 2480.69 |
| Michigan | Lansing | 111,965 | 3875.32 | 9.82 | 104.50 | 96.46 | 1134.28 | 1345.06 | 31.26 | 421.56 | 1429.02 | 648.42 | 2499.00 |
| Michigan | Sterling Heights | 133,058 | 1276.89 | 0.75 | 30.81 | 15.03 | 182.63 | 229.22 | 5.26 | 76.66 | 789.13 | 176.61 | 1042.40 |
| Michigan | Warren | 135,843 | 2111.26 | 5.15 | 76.56 | 35.33 | 424.76 | 541.80 | 15.46 | 204.65 | 997.48 | 351.88 | 1554.00 |
| Minnesota | Rochester | 122,694 | 1526.56 | 4.08 | 26.08 | 26.08 | 97.80 | 154.04 | 4.08 | 173.60 | 1103.56 | 91.28 | 1368.45 |
| Missouri | Columbia | 130,354 | 2688.06 | 9.97 | 38.36 | 39.89 | 259.29 | 347.52 | 23.01 | 332.94 | 1605.63 | 378.97 | 2317.54 |
| Missouri | Independence | 120,271 | 4109.89 | 9.15 | 89.80 | 75.66 | 396.60 | 571.21 | 14.97 | 407.41 | 2301.47 | 814.83 | 3523.71 |
| Missouri | Lee's Summit | 105,053 | 2446.38 | 0.95 | 29.51 | 9.52 | 109.47 | 149.45 | 2.86 | 128.51 | 1871.44 | 294.14 | 2294.08 |
| Missouri | Springfield | 170,527 | 5379.79 | 5.86 | 104.38 | 123.73 | 944.13 | 1178.11 | 17.01 | 726.57 | 3001.28 | 456.82 | 4184.67 |
| Montana | Billings | 122,105 | 3859.79 | 7.37 | 78.62 | 85.99 | 574.10 | 746.08 | 30.30 | 364.44 | 2299.66 | 419.31 | 3083.41 |
| Nevada | Sparks | 110,807 | 2987.18 | 4.51 | 83.93 | 55.95 | 249.98 | 394.38 | 9.02 | 301.43 | 1964.68 | 317.67 | 2583.77 |
| New Hampshire | Manchester | 115,464 | 1994.56 | 1.73 | 51.96 | 58.03 | 224.31 | 336.04 | 10.39 | 92.67 | 1404.77 | 150.70 | 1648.13 |
| New Jersey | Edison Township | 109,086 | 2056.18 | 0.92 | 10.08 | 45.84 | 118.26 | 175.09 | 4.58 | 187.93 | 1569.40 | 119.17 | 1876.50 |
| New Jersey | Elizabeth | 138,500 | 3069.31 | 3.61 | 31.77 | 112.64 | 260.65 | 408.66 | 2.89 | 148.01 | 1908.30 | 601.44 | 2657.76 |
| New Jersey | Lakewood Township | 144,876 | 739.94 | 1.38 | 15.19 | 18.64 | 115.27 | 150.47 | 4.83 | 87.66 | 464.54 | 32.44 | 584.64 |
| New Jersey | Paterson | 158,903 | 3338.51 | 6.29 | 37.13 | 247.32 | 687.84 | 978.58 | 8.81 | 359.97 | 1480.78 | 510.37 | 2351.12 |
| New Jersey | Toms River Township | 102,734 | 1259.56 | 0.97 | 28.23 | 9.73 | 95.39 | 134.33 | 4.87 | 75.92 | 992.86 | 51.59 | 1120.37 |
| New Mexico | Las Cruces | 115,977 | 5601.97 | 12.07 | 57.77 | 57.77 | 592.36 | 719.97 | 8.62 | 737.22 | 3442.92 | 693.24 | 4873.38 |
| New Mexico | Rio Rancho | 112,817 | 1661.98 | 7.09 | 37.23 | 7.98 | 265.92 | 318.21 | 4.43 | 188.80 | 1022.01 | 128.53 | 1339.34 |
| New York | Albany | 102,095 | 3692.64 | 8.82 | 72.48 | 179.24 | 556.34 | 816.89 | 27.43 | 312.45 | 2250.84 | 285.03 | 2848.33 |
| New York | Amherst Town | 126,184 | 2164.30 | 0.00 | 8.72 | 11.09 | 84.00 | 103.82 | 2.38 | 91.93 | 1723.67 | 242.50 | 2058.11 |
| New York | Ramapo Town | 110,136 | 710.03 | 0.91 | 3.63 | 10.90 | 59.93 | 75.36 | 4.54 | 57.20 | 547.50 | 25.42 | 630.13 |
| New York | Rochester | 206,093 | 3923.96 | 13.10 | 18.44 | 153.33 | 397.39 | 582.26 | 52.40 | 404.67 | 1795.79 | 1088.83 | 3289.29 |
| New York | Syracuse | 145,175 | 5014.64 | 15.15 | 58.55 | 133.63 | 557.95 | 765.28 | 15.15 | 721.20 | 2638.20 | 874.81 | 4234.20 |
| New York | Yonkers | 206,557 | 1338.13 | 1.94 | 9.20 | 63.42 | 237.22 | 311.78 | 11.62 | 118.13 | 742.17 | 154.44 | 1014.73 |
| North Carolina | Cary | 181,793 | 1392.79 | 1.65 | 6.60 | 12.65 | 50.06 | 70.96 | 4.40 | 88.56 | 1110.60 | 118.27 | 1317.43 |
| North Carolina | Concord | 111,922 | 1267.85 | 5.36 | 10.72 | 25.02 | 117.94 | 159.04 | 3.57 | 113.47 | 824.68 | 167.08 | 1105.23 |
| North Carolina | Fayetteville | 209,945 | 3781.47 | 12.38 | 32.87 | 100.98 | 513.94 | 660.17 | 26.67 | 387.24 | 2349.19 | 358.19 | 3094.62 |
| North Carolina | High Point | 117,629 | 2944.85 | 2.55 | 12.75 | 78.21 | 361.31 | 454.82 | 34.01 | 343.45 | 1510.68 | 601.89 | 2456.03 |
| North Carolina | Wilmington | 125,101 | 4003.96 | 5.60 | 45.56 | 72.74 | 358.91 | 482.81 | 6.39 | 361.31 | 2841.70 | 311.75 | 3514.76 |
| North Dakota | Fargo | 135,682 | 4206.16 | 4.42 | 102.45 | 77.39 | 313.97 | 498.22 | 11.06 | 741.44 | 2600.93 | 354.51 | 3696.88 |
| Ohio | Akron | 188,223 | 3797.09 | 12.75 | 113.16 | 82.35 | 612.04 | 820.30 | 21.78 | 379.34 | 2162.86 | 412.81 | 2955.01 |
| Ohio | Dayton | 134,857 | 5707.53 | 29.66 | 116.42 | 252.86 | 940.26 | 1339.20 | 34.11 | 859.43 | 2144.49 | 1330.30 | 4334.22 |
| Oklahoma | Broken Arrow | 121,004 | 1426.40 | 3.31 | 34.71 | 8.26 | 176.85 | 223.13 | 2.48 | 159.50 | 932.20 | 109.09 | 1200.79 |
| Oklahoma | Norman | 130,681 | 2529.82 | 0.77 | 39.03 | 18.37 | 202.02 | 260.18 | 3.06 | 351.24 | 1687.31 | 228.04 | 2266.59 |
| Oregon | Bend | 106,241 | 1551.19 | 2.82 | 22.59 | 22.59 | 120.48 | 168.48 | 20.71 | 128.95 | 1150.22 | 82.83 | 1362.00 |
| Oregon | Eugene | 178,057 | 3642.09 | 1.12 | 46.05 | 70.76 | 199.94 | 317.88 | 68.52 | 475.69 | 2458.20 | 321.81 | 3255.70 |
| Oregon | Gresham | 109,452 | 2850.56 | 5.48 | 57.56 | 84.97 | 262.22 | 410.23 | 13.70 | 318.86 | 1472.79 | 634.98 | 2426.63 |
| Oregon | Hillsboro | 107,978 | 2778.34 | 0.00 | 48.16 | 61.12 | 208.38 | 317.66 | 31.49 | 174.11 | 2068.94 | 186.15 | 2429.20 |
| Oregon | Salem | 177,936 | 3397.29 | 4.50 | 37.09 | 88.80 | 401.83 | 532.21 | 61.82 | 442.29 | 1965.88 | 395.09 | 2803.26 |
| Pennsylvania | Allentown | 124,599 | 1849.93 | 3.21 | 26.48 | 56.98 | 185.39 | 272.07 | 8.83 | 121.19 | 1252.02 | 195.83 | 1569.03 |
| Rhode Island | Providence | 193,679 | 1935.16 | 6.20 | 20.65 | 55.76 | 194.14 | 276.75 | 0.52 | 117.20 | 1330.04 | 210.66 | 1657.90 |
| South Carolina | Charleston | 156,898 | 2389.45 | 4.46 | 28.04 | 42.70 | 282.35 | 357.56 | 10.20 | 139.58 | 1656.49 | 225.62 | 2021.70 |
| South Carolina | Columbia | 144,559 | 4021.89 | 9.68 | 61.57 | 108.61 | 590.07 | 769.93 | 19.37 | 496.68 | 2356.82 | 379.08 | 3232.59 |
| South Carolina | North Charleston | 123,511 | 4771.23 | 17.00 | 60.72 | 153.02 | 579.71 | 810.45 | 4.86 | 323.86 | 3105.80 | 526.27 | 3955.92 |
| South Dakota | Sioux Falls | 210,926 | 3453.82 | 6.64 | 27.97 | 47.41 | 444.71 | 526.73 | 11.85 | 302.95 | 2174.70 | 437.59 | 2915.24 |
| Tennessee | Chattanooga | 188,894 | 4778.87 | 12.71 | 91.06 | 93.70 | 626.28 | 823.74 | 12.71 | 379.58 | 2896.33 | 666.51 | 3942.42 |
| Tennessee | Clarksville | 185,349 | 2051.80 | 4.86 | 54.49 | 23.20 | 327.49 | 410.04 | 9.71 | 201.24 | 1248.46 | 182.36 | 1632.06 |
| Tennessee | Knoxville | 200,457 | 3466.08 | 10.97 | 64.85 | 81.81 | 582.67 | 740.31 | 4.49 | 328.75 | 2013.90 | 378.63 | 2721.28 |
| Tennessee | Murfreesboro | 169,520 | 2443.96 | 2.95 | 51.91 | 29.50 | 335.65 | 420.01 | 1.77 | 163.40 | 1658.80 | 199.98 | 2022.18 |
| Texas | Abilene | 130,275 | 2193.05 | 4.61 | 70.62 | 46.06 | 303.20 | 424.49 | 5.37 | 320.09 | 1304.93 | 138.17 | 1763.19 |
| Texas | Allen | 113,737 | 985.61 | 0.00 | 23.74 | 9.67 | 72.98 | 106.39 | 0.88 | 62.42 | 727.12 | 88.80 | 878.34 |
| Texas | Amarillo | 203,039 | 3374.72 | 8.37 | 73.88 | 86.68 | 521.57 | 690.51 | 28.57 | 377.76 | 2017.35 | 260.54 | 2655.65 |
| Texas | Beaumont | 111,320 | 4450.23 | 12.58 | 95.22 | 154.51 | 874.96 | 1137.26 | 10.78 | 786.02 | 2270.03 | 246.14 | 3302.19 |
| Texas | Brownsville | 191,221 | 2404.02 | 2.09 | 30.85 | 60.66 | 362.41 | 456.02 | 6.28 | 192.45 | 1335.63 | 413.66 | 1941.73 |
| Texas | Carrollton | 133,471 | 1457.25 | 0.75 | 12.74 | 22.48 | 101.15 | 137.11 | 4.50 | 152.09 | 961.26 | 202.29 | 1315.64 |
| Texas | College Station | 126,702 | 1273.86 | 2.37 | 59.19 | 11.84 | 97.08 | 170.48 | 0.79 | 161.80 | 842.92 | 97.87 | 1102.59 |
| Texas | Conroe | 114,592 | 1878.84 | 0.87 | 64.58 | 35.78 | 142.24 | 243.47 | 1.75 | 140.50 | 1362.22 | 130.90 | 1633.62 |
| Texas | Denton | 164,565 | 1954.24 | 4.25 | 57.73 | 26.13 | 116.06 | 204.17 | 5.47 | 133.08 | 1470.54 | 140.98 | 1744.60 |
| Texas | Edinburg | 107,552 | 2032.51 | 1.86 | 85.54 | 21.39 | 160.85 | 269.64 | 5.58 | 127.38 | 1468.13 | 161.78 | 1757.29 |
| Texas | Frisco | 232,961 | 1106.62 | 1.29 | 23.61 | 12.45 | 63.53 | 100.88 | 3.00 | 68.25 | 866.67 | 67.82 | 1002.74 |
| Texas | Garland | 246,255 | 2225.34 | 4.87 | 26.40 | 60.51 | 140.91 | 232.69 | 4.47 | 303.34 | 1283.63 | 401.21 | 1988.18 |
| Texas | Grand Prairie | 206,122 | 1825.62 | 1.94 | 19.89 | 28.14 | 171.26 | 221.23 | 3.40 | 156.70 | 1147.86 | 296.43 | 1600.99 |
| Texas | Killeen | 161,667 | 1913.19 | 12.37 | 68.66 | 54.43 | 392.16 | 527.63 | 3.09 | 313.61 | 784.33 | 284.54 | 1382.47 |
| Texas | League City | 116,881 | 1264.53 | 3.42 | 28.23 | 7.70 | 64.17 | 103.52 | 0.86 | 174.54 | 898.35 | 87.27 | 1160.15 |
| Texas | Lewisville | 136,046 | 1708.25 | 2.94 | 41.16 | 16.91 | 126.43 | 187.44 | 3.68 | 131.57 | 1109.18 | 276.38 | 1517.13 |
| Texas | McAllen | 148,017 | 1991.66 | 2.70 | 39.18 | 23.65 | 84.45 | 149.98 | 6.08 | 63.51 | 1704.53 | 67.56 | 1835.60 |
| Texas | McKinney | 219,132 | 936.42 | 2.74 | 26.92 | 12.78 | 74.84 | 117.28 | 3.65 | 85.34 | 656.68 | 73.47 | 815.49 |
| Texas | Mesquite | 148,803 | 3483.13 | 4.03 | 40.32 | 80.64 | 376.34 | 501.33 | 5.38 | 391.79 | 1965.01 | 619.61 | 2976.42 |
| Texas | Midland | 140,303 | 1979.29 | 4.99 | 67.00 | 23.52 | 269.42 | 364.92 | 2.14 | 228.79 | 1172.46 | 210.97 | 1612.22 |
| Texas | New Braunfels | 118,268 | 1442.49 | 1.69 | 16.91 | 12.68 | 125.14 | 156.42 | 2.54 | 126.83 | 1051.00 | 105.69 | 1283.53 |
| Texas | Odessa | 116,039 | 2158.76 | 3.45 | 53.43 | 38.78 | 220.62 | 316.27 | 0.00 | 219.75 | 1368.51 | 254.22 | 1842.48 |
| Texas | Pasadena | 145,199 | 2927.02 | 4.13 | 69.56 | 73.69 | 418.74 | 566.12 | 8.95 | 252.07 | 1677.70 | 422.18 | 2351.94 |
| Texas | Pearland | 128,322 | 1537.54 | 2.34 | 24.16 | 14.81 | 54.55 | 95.85 | 1.56 | 144.17 | 1205.56 | 90.40 | 1440.13 |
| Texas | Richardson | 117,962 | 1983.69 | 1.70 | 8.48 | 38.15 | 98.34 | 146.66 | 3.39 | 220.41 | 1295.33 | 317.90 | 1833.64 |
| Texas | Round Rock | 133,868 | 2073.68 | 1.49 | 29.13 | 17.18 | 82.92 | 130.73 | 2.24 | 170.32 | 1629.22 | 141.18 | 1940.72 |
| Texas | Sugar Land | 107,757 | 1462.55 | 0.93 | 8.35 | 23.20 | 45.47 | 77.95 | 0.93 | 118.79 | 1169.30 | 95.59 | 1383.67 |
| Texas | Tyler | 111,714 | 2304.99 | 8.06 | 83.25 | 41.18 | 258.70 | 391.18 | 0.00 | 184.40 | 1592.46 | 136.96 | 1913.82 |
| Texas | Waco | 146,270 | 2557.60 | 5.47 | 90.93 | 57.43 | 272.10 | 425.92 | 5.47 | 294.66 | 1626.44 | 205.10 | 2126.20 |
| Texas | Wichita Falls | 102,762 | 2970.94 | 8.76 | 63.25 | 59.36 | 218.95 | 350.32 | 1.95 | 444.72 | 1928.73 | 245.23 | 2618.67 |
| Utah | Provo | 112,763 | 1486.30 | 1.77 | 73.61 | 17.74 | 113.51 | 206.63 | 8.87 | 70.06 | 1134.24 | 66.51 | 1270.81 |
| Utah | Salt Lake City | 212,675 | 6085.81 | 5.17 | 158.46 | 183.38 | 517.22 | 864.23 | 21.63 | 551.08 | 4184.79 | 464.09 | 5199.95 |
| Utah | St. George | 107,595 | 1214.74 | 0.93 | 57.62 | 22.31 | 129.19 | 210.05 | 1.86 | 182.16 | 763.05 | 57.62 | 1002.83 |
| Utah | West Jordan | 114,211 | 1660.09 | 0.00 | 68.29 | 23.64 | 202.26 | 294.19 | 7.00 | 135.71 | 1091.84 | 131.34 | 1358.89 |
| Utah | West Valley | 132,686 | 2315.99 | 6.78 | 73.86 | 66.32 | 322.57 | 469.53 | 4.52 | 195.95 | 1407.08 | 238.91 | 1841.94 |
| Virginia | Alexandria | 155,153 | 2861.69 | 1.29 | 7.73 | 72.83 | 137.28 | 219.14 | 2.58 | 96.03 | 2301.60 | 242.34 | 2639.97 |
| Virginia | Hampton | 138,100 | 3139.75 | 10.86 | 28.96 | 56.48 | 151.34 | 247.65 | 10.14 | 209.99 | 2433.02 | 238.96 | 2881.97 |
| Virginia | Newport News | 183,563 | 3173.30 | 11.98 | 28.87 | 84.98 | 610.14 | 735.99 | 21.25 | 221.72 | 1908.88 | 285.46 | 2416.06 |
| Virginia | Norfolk | 230,460 | 4245.86 | 16.05 | 40.35 | 77.24 | 335.85 | 469.50 | 3.91 | 254.27 | 3122.88 | 395.30 | 3772.46 |
| Virginia | Richmond | 231,805 | 3530.99 | 24.16 | 18.55 | 94.48 | 199.74 | 336.92 | 14.67 | 265.31 | 2386.92 | 527.17 | 3179.40 |
| Virginia | Suffolk | 103,506 | 1952.54 | 10.63 | 30.92 | 40.58 | 288.87 | 370.99 | 10.63 | 86.95 | 1361.27 | 122.70 | 1570.92 |
| Washington | Bellevue | 151,520 | 3486.67 | 0.66 | 9.90 | 50.82 | 77.22 | 138.60 | 8.58 | 362.33 | 2636.62 | 340.55 | 3339.49 |
| Washington | Everett | 111,276 | 3500.31 | 5.39 | 32.35 | 67.40 | 159.96 | 265.11 | 16.18 | 354.97 | 2060.64 | 803.41 | 3219.02 |
| Washington | Kent | 132,324 | 4286.45 | 5.29 | 64.24 | 144.34 | 275.84 | 489.71 | 25.69 | 690.73 | 2149.27 | 931.05 | 3771.05 |
| Washington | Renton | 103,762 | 3662.23 | 4.82 | 45.30 | 91.56 | 197.57 | 339.24 | 9.64 | 435.61 | 1739.56 | 1138.18 | 3313.35 |
| Washington | Spokane | 229,529 | 5570.97 | 6.97 | 76.68 | 145.08 | 446.13 | 674.86 | 55.33 | 646.54 | 3668.82 | 525.42 | 4840.78 |
| Washington | Spokane Valley | 109,852 | 3769.62 | 0.91 | 27.31 | 36.41 | 177.51 | 242.14 | 11.83 | 603.54 | 2608.05 | 304.05 | 3515.64 |
| Washington | Tacoma | 223,980 | 6715.33 | 9.82 | 67.86 | 184.39 | 800.96 | 1063.04 | 48.67 | 669.70 | 3521.30 | 1412.63 | 5603.63 |
| Washington | Vancouver | 198,194 | 4006.18 | 5.55 | 61.56 | 122.10 | 393.05 | 582.26 | 16.65 | 469.24 | 2341.14 | 596.89 | 3407.27 |
| Wisconsin | Green Bay | 105,240 | 1810.15 | 1.90 | 61.76 | 26.61 | 404.79 | 495.06 | 2.85 | 108.32 | 950.21 | 253.71 | 1312.24 |

Notes:

^{1} The FBI does not publish arson data unless it receives data from either the agency or the state for all 12 months of the calendar year.
^{2} Because of changes in this agency's reporting practices, figures are not comparable to previous years' data.
^{3} Limited data for 2024 were available for Florida.

== Criticism of ranking crime data ==
The FBI web site recommends against using its data for ranking because these rankings lead to simplistic and/or incomplete analyses that often create misleading perceptions adversely affecting cities and counties, along with their residents. The FBI web site also recommends against using its data to judge how effective law enforcement agencies are, since there are many factors that influence crime rates other than law enforcement.

In November 2007, the executive board of the American Society of Criminology (ASC) went further than the FBI itself, and approved a resolution opposing not only the use of the ratings to judge police departments, but also opposing any development of city crime rankings from FBI Uniform Crime Reports (UCRs) at all. The resolution opposed these rankings on the grounds that they "fail to account for the many conditions affecting crime rates" and "divert attention from the individual and community characteristics that elevate crime in all cities", though it did not provide sources or further elaborate on these claims. The resolution states the rankings "represent an irresponsible misuse of the data and do groundless harm to many communities" and "work against a key goal of our society, which is a better understanding of crime-related issues by both scientists and the public".

The U.S. Conference of Mayors passed a similar statement, which also committed the Conference to working with the FBI and the U.S. Department of Justice "to educate reporters, elected officials, and citizens on what the (UCR) data means and doesn't mean."

== Criticism of comparing crime rates ==
Crime rates per capita might also be biased by population size depending on the crime type. This misrepresentation occurs because rates per capita assume that crime increases at the same pace as the number of people in an area. When this linear assumption does not hold, rates per capita still have population effects. In these nonlinear cases, per capita rates can inflate or deflate the representation of crime in cities, introducing an artifactual bias into rankings. Therefore, it is necessary to test for linearity before comparing crime rates of cities of different sizes.

== Other city crime rates ==
- United States cities by crime rate, populations 250,000+
- United States cities by crime rate (60,000-100,000)
- List of Canada cities by crime severity index

== See also ==
- List of U.S. states and territories by violent crime rate
- List of U.S. states and territories by intentional homicide rate
- List of cities by murder rate
- Homicide in world cities
- Crime in the United States
