= List of cities by homicide rate =

The following article is a list of cities sorted by homicide rates in the world, excluding active war zones. The homicide rate of a city is an imprecise tool for comparison, as the population within city borders may not best represent an urban or metropolitan area with varying rates in different areas.

== Rankings (2023–2024) ==
The following 50 cities have the highest homicide rates in the world of all cities not at war, with a population of at least 300,000 people. For cities without data prior to 2023 or 2024, figures are based upon 2022 data from El Consejo Ciudadano para la Seguridad Pública y la Justicia Penal (The Citizen Council for Public Security and Criminal Justice), an advocacy group from Mexico City.

Rank	City	Country	Homicides	Population	Per 100,000
1	Colima	Mexico	601	330,329	181.94
2	Durán	Ecuador	453	306,045	148.00
3	Ciudad Obregón	Mexico	454	328,430	138.23
4	Zacatecas	Mexico	490	363,996	134.62
5	Nelson Mandela Bay	South Africa	1,247	1,212,836	102.82
6	Cajeme	Mexico	432	485,453	88.99
7	Tijuana	Mexico	1,638	1,863,973	87.88
8	Guayaquil	Ecuador	2,319	2,765,695	83.80
9	Uruapan	Mexico	282	360,338	78.26
10	Machala	Ecuador	239	308,461	77.50
11	Durban	South Africa	3,138	4,080,930	76.89
12	Portoviejo	Ecuador	247	325,193	76.00
13	Feira de Santana	Brazil	459	614,872	74.65
14	Kingston	Jamaica	475	671,596	70.73
15	Celaya	Mexico	370	543,570	68.07
16	Macapá	Brazil	341	503,327	67.75
17	Port-au-Prince	Haiti	827	1,231,788	67.20
18	Cape Town	South Africa	3,231	4,837,094	66.80
19	uMgungundlovu	South Africa	758	1,144,103	66.25
20	Ciudad Juárez	Mexico	986	1,489,507	66.20
21	Acapulco	Mexico	513	782,661	65.55
22	Buffalo City	South Africa	521	794,389	65.59
23	Caucaia	Brazil	237	361,400	65.58
24	Irapuato	Mexico	539	874,997	61.60
25	Cuernavaca	Mexico	410	681,086	60.20
26	Salvador	Brazil	2,085	3,678,414	56.68
27	Manaus	Brazil	1,041	2,054,731	50.66
28	Memphis	United States	297	618,639	48.00
29	Vitória da Conquista	Brazil	184	387,524	47.48
30	Natal	Brazil	569	1,262,741	45.06
31	Cancun	Mexico	406	920,865	44.09
32	Chihuahua	Mexico	414	944,413	43.84
33	Fortaleza	Brazil	1,678	3,936,509	42.63
34	Cali	Colombia	1,007	2,392,381	42.09
35	Morelia	Mexico	359	853,831	42.05
36	Johannesburg	South Africa	2,547	6,148,353	41.43
37	Recife	Brazil	1,494	3,745,082	39.89
38	Maceió	Brazil	379	960,667	39.45
39	Santa Marta	Colombia	280	712,896	39.28
40	León	Mexico	782	2,077,830	37.64
41	Teresina	Brazil	324	868,523	37.30
42	San Juan	Puerto Rico	125	337,300	37.06
43	San Pedro Sula	Honduras	278	771,627	36.03
44	Baltimore	United States	201	568,271	35.30
45	Buenaventura	Colombia	157	315,743	35.16
46	Ensenada	Mexico	157	449,425	34.93
47	New Orleans	United States	124	362,701	34.18
48	Tegucigalpa	Honduras	389	1,185,662	32.81
49	Detroit	United States	203	631,524	32.10

=== By country ===
Homicide rate top 50: Number of cities by country
Country	2018	2019	2020	2021	2022
Mexico	15	18	18	18	17
Brazil	14	10	11	11	10
United States	4	3	5	7	7
Colombia	2	3	2	4	6
South Africa	3	3	4	4	4
Honduras	2	2	2	2	2
Jamaica	1	1	1	1	1
Puerto Rico	1	1	1	1	1
Haiti	0	0	1	1	1
Ecuador	0	0	0	1	1
Venezuela	6	6	6	No data	No data
Guatemala	1	1	0	0	0
El Salvador	1	0	0	0	0

== Other statistics ==
City	Country	Homicides	Population	Per 100,000	Year
Zamora	Mexico	258	204,860	125.94	2023
Tijuana	Mexico	1,844	1,922,523	95.92	2023
Fresnillo	Mexico	219	240,532	91.05	2023
St. Louis	United States	150	277,294	54.10	2024
Celaya	Mexico	432	521,169	82.89	2023
Cancún	Mexico	765	934,189	81.89	2023
Jackson	United States	118	149,765	78.79	2023
Uruapan	Mexico	258	356,786	72.31	2023
Ciudad Bolívar	Venezuela	264	382,095	69.09	2018
Ciudad Juárez	Mexico	1,033	1,512,450	68.30	2023
Belém	Brazil	1,627	2,491,052	65.31	2018
Cape Town	South Africa	2,947	4,604,986	64.00	2021
Irapuato	Mexico	374	592,953	63.07	2023
Cumaná	Venezuela	225	360,436	62.42	2021
Mossoró	Brazil	187	300,618	62.21	2021
Ciudad Guayana	Venezuela	471	758,490	62.10	2021
Zacatecas	Mexico	214	361,347	59.22	2021
Baltimore	United States	197	566,632	34.80	2024
Caracas	Venezuela	1,417	2,682,801	52.82	2021
Vitória da Conquista	Brazil	179	341,128	52.47	2021
New Orleans	United States	193	364,197	53.00	2024
Nelson Mandela Bay	South Africa	621	1,213,060	51.19	2021
Maturín	Venezuela	254	497,723	51.03	2021
San Salvador	El Salvador	906	1,800,336	50.32	2018
Birmingham	United States	115	195,418	58.90	2024
Aracaju	Brazil	463	949,342	48.77	2018
Memphis	United States	249	613,207	40.60	2024
Cuernavaca	Mexico	436	896,688	48.62	2021
Coatzacoalcos	Mexico	162	335,077	48.35	2018
Palmira	Colombia	149	310,608	47.97	2018
Detroit	United States	203	651,171	31.20	2024
Macapá	Brazil	233	493,634	47.20	2018
Baton Rouge	United States	53	219,086	24.20	2024
Campos dos Goytacazes	Brazil	233	503,424	46.28	2018
Tepic	Mexico	230	512,387	44.89	2018
Cleveland	United States	109	362,762	30.10	2024
Guatemala City	Guatemala	1,411	3,226,974	43.73	2018
Durban	South Africa	1,727	3,981,205	43.38	2021
Rio Branco	Brazil	173	413,418	41.85	2021
Reynosa	Mexico	295	711,130	41.48	2018
João Pessoa	Brazil	460	1,112,304	41.36	2018
San Pedro Sula	Honduras	330	801,259	41.19	2021
Colima	Mexico	135	328,471	41.10	2021
Ensenada	Mexico	175	443,807	39.43	2023
Maceió	Brazil	404	1,025,360	39.40	2021
Cúcuta	Colombia	325	861,000	37.75	2021
Shreveport	United States	47	175,092	26.80	2024
Barquisimeto	Venezuela	402	1,095,161	36.71	2021
Caruaru	Brazil	133	365,278	36.41	2021
Philadelphia	United States	262	1,549,259	16.91	2024
Richmond (VA)	United States	56	231,805	24.20	2024
Rochester	United States	27	206,093	13.10	2024
Teresina	Brazil	302	868,075	34.79	2021
Minatitlán (Colima)	Mexico	109	314,348	34.67	2021
Milwaukee	United States	134	560,416	23.90	2024
Dayton	United States	40	134,857	29.70	2024
North Charleston	United States	21	123,511	17.00	2024
Atlanta	United States	132	500,212	26.40	2024
Washington, D.C.	United States	179	702,250	25.50	2024
San Bernardino	United States	25	224,283	11.20	2024
Oakland	United States	81	435,042	18.60	2024
Ciudad Victoria	Mexico	108	349,688	30.88	2023
Kansas City	United States	141	511,535	27.60	2024
Louisville	United States	147	676,843	21.70	2024
Chicago	United States	461	2,638,698	17.50	2024
Little Rock	United States	36	204,247	17.60	2024
Cincinnati	United States	68	311,599	21.80	2024
South Bend	United States	3	103,415	2.90	2024
Indianapolis	United States	178	890,685	20.00	2024
Hartford	United States	21	119,626	17.60	2024
Miami Gardens	United States	13	110,466	11.80	2024
Las Vegas	United States	152	646,790	23.50	2021
Peoria	United States	14	109,677	12.80	2024
Columbus (OH)	United States	112	915,447	12.20	2024
Toledo	United States	32	263,668	12.14	2024
Minneapolis	United States	76	423,282	17.90	2024
Columbia	United States	14	144,559	9.68	2024
Akron	United States	24	188,223	12.75	2024
Albuquerque	United States	103	558,745	18.40	2024
Savannah	United States	23	241,780	9.51	2024
Columbus (GA)	United States	26	201,061	12.93	2024
Tuscaloosa	United States	18	113,834	15.81	2024
Houston	United States	320	2,319,160	13.80	2024
Montgomery	United States	35	193,728	18.10	2024
Newark	United States	39	309,708	12.59	2024
Chattanooga	United States	24	188,894	12.71	2024
New Haven	United States	15	137,243	10.93	2024
Buffalo	United States	34	273,728	12.42	2024
Augusta	United States	35	198,014	17.69	2019
Tucson	United States	37	548,789	6.74	2024
High Point	United States	3	117,629	2.55	2024
Dallas	United States	180	1,321,502	13.62	2024
Greensboro	United States	43	304,306	14.13	2024
Beaumont	United States	14	111,320	12.58	2024
Richmond (CA)	United States	9	113,418	7.94	2024
West Palm Beach	United States	10	126,427	7.91	2024
Norfolk	United States	37	230,460	16.05	2024
Bakersfield	United States	60	407,615	14.70	2021
Nashville	United States	99	692,587	14.60	2021
Pittsburgh	United States	43	300,431	14.31	2021
Tulsa	United States	59	411,401	14.30	2021
Denver	United States	100	711,463	14.10	2021
Thunder Bay	Canada	15	108,843	13.78	2022
Durham	United States	39	285,527	13.66	2021
Newport News	United States	24	179,736	13.53	2019
Jacksonville	United States	128	954,614	13.40	2021
Los Cabos	Mexico	47	351,111	13.39	2023
Paterson	United States	19	145,234	13.08	2019
Fresno	United States	71	544,510	13.00	2021
Springfield	United States	20	153,404	12.96	2019
Portland	United States	83	641,162	12.90	2021
Fayetteville	United States	27	212,093	12.76	2019
Fort Worth	United States	118	935,508	12.60	2021
Syracuse	United States	18	146,103	12.32	2021
Phoenix	United States	198	1,625,000	12.20	2021
Oklahoma City	United States	82	687,725	11.90	2021
Bridgeport	United States	17	144,556	11.73	2019
Knoxville	United States	22	187,532	11.66	2019
San Antonio	United States	168	1,452,000	11.60	2021
Fort Lauderdale	United States	37	184,347	20.10	2024
Hampton	United States	15	135,048	11.26	2019
Charlotte	United States	98	879,709	11.10	2021
Providence	United States	21	189,692	11.07	2021
Sacramento	United States	57	525,041	10.90	2021
Fort Wayne	United States	29	265,974	10.90	2021
Miami	United States	47	439,890	10.70	2021
Los Angeles	United States	396	3,849,000	10.30	2021
Lexington	United States	33	321,793	10.26	2021
Aurora	United States	39	389,347	10.02	2021
Stockton	United States	32	322,120	9.93	2021
Tampa	United States	36	387,050	9.30	2021
Charleston	United States	14	151,612	9.23	2021
Winston-Salem	United States	23	250,320	9.19	2021
Austin	United States	79	964,177	8.20	2021
Long Beach	United States	37	456,062	8.10	2021
Salt Lake City	United States	16	200,478	7.98	2021
Colorado Springs	United States	38	483,956	7.90	2021
Regina	Canada	17	226,404	7.50	2021
Winnipeg	Canada	54	749,607	7.20	2022
Orlando	United States	22	309,154	7.12	2021
San Francisco	United States	56	815,201	6.90	2021
Omaha	United States	32	487,300	6.60	2021
Honolulu	United States	21	345,510	6.08	2021
New York City	United States	491	8,468,000	5.80	2021
Wichita	United States	23	395,699	5.80	2021
Seattle	United States	41	733,919	5.60	2021
Boston	United States	36	654,776	5.50	2021
Raleigh	United States	26	469,124	5.50	2021
Kaunas	Lithuania	21	383,764	5.40	2017
Spokane	United States	12	229,071	5.24	2021
Mesa	United States	25	509,475	4.90	2021
Arlington	United States	19	392,786	4.80	2021
San Diego	United States	63	1,382,000	4.60	2021
El Paso	United States	30	678,415	4.40	2021
Klaipėda	Lithuania	7	172,272	3.90	2017
Marseille	France	51	860,000	5.93	2023
San Jose	United States	31	983,489	3.20	2021
Virginia Beach	United States	14	457,672	3.10	2021
Toronto	Canada	85	2,794,356	3.04	2021
Debrecen	Hungary	6	202,000	3.00	2017
Lincoln	United States	8	292,657	2.73	2021
Montreal	Canada	41	1,762,949	2.32	2022
Amsterdam	Netherlands	16	844,947	2.20	2017
Tampere	Finland	5	236,000	2.20	2017
Chandler	United States	6	279,458	2.15	2021
Istanbul	Turkey	282	15,460,000	1.81	2019
Plano	United States	5	288,253	1.73	2021
McKinney	United States	3	202,690	1.48	2021
Chula Vista	United States	4	277,220	1.44	2021
Glendale	United States	1	192,366	0.52	2021
Macao	China	2	686,600	0.32	2023
Hong Kong	China	22	7,481,000	0.29	2020

== See also ==
- Firearm death rates in the United States by state
- Homicide in world cities
- List of Brazilian states by murder rate
- List of countries by firearm-related death rate
- List of countries by intentional death rate – homicide plus suicide
- List of countries by intentional homicide rate
- List of countries by life expectancy
- List of countries by suicide rate
- List of federal subjects of Russia by murder rate
- List of Mexican states by homicides
- List of U.S. states by homicide rate
- List of United States cities by crime rate (2014)
- Number of guns per capita by country
- Right to keep and bear arms in the United States
- United States cities by crime rate (100,000–250,000)
- United States cities by crime rate (60,000-100,000)
- List of Canada cities by crime severity index
