= Homicide in world cities =

This article contains A-Z tables of the incidence of intentional homicide in multi-municipal metropolitan areas and standalone municipalities with a predominantly urbanized population. It does not take into consideration capricious political divisions widely used in the media to represent a city, such as city proper or suburban municipalities. The urban population for each entry is required to be at least 100,000.

Some cities are considered to be larger than the official metropolitan area or municipality determined by a country's respective government. Conversely, some cities are also considered to be significantly smaller than their official metro area(s) designations. Because of this and the continual growth of most cities that might not immediately be captured, the widest neutrally-sourced boundaries for each city are used. This includes the crossing of international borders.

== 1980s by count ==
No.	City	Flag	1980	1981	1982	1983	1984	1985	1986	1987	1988	1989
	Baltimore	(United States)						898	897	294	356	
490	Belo Horizonte	(Brazil)	450	335	321	297	314	267	293	318	324	411
	Bogotá	(Colombia)						609				
	Brasília	(Brazil)										461
	Cali	(Colombia)	225	388	381	327	459	859				
	Chicago	(United States)	877								743	
	Curitiba	(Brazil)	129	99	158	175	175	176	151	179	234	301
	Fortaleza	(Brazil)	352	364	340	417	412	400	368	302	345	463
	Goiânia	(Brazil)	127	138	117	104	77	56	77	134	267	299
	Houston	(United States)	799		879	731	638	620	546	464	566	578
	Los Angeles	(United States)	1,731	1,500	1,416	1,348	1,301	1,326	1,409	1,412	1,346	1,587
	Maceió	(Brazil)										449
	Manaus	(Brazil)	129	123	139	118	170	153	131	167	186	283
	Manila	(Philippines)	456	494	436	492	553	748	764	1,123	1,115	1,183
	Medellín	(Colombia)	715	920	851	818	1,062	1,609				
	Miami	(United States)	748	818	732	583	629	578	585	593		615
	Philadelphia	(United States)									502	
	Porto Alegre	(Brazil)	161	210	236	202	151	175	229	256	433	704
	Recife	(Brazil)	638	745	747	889	1,025	1,166	1,170	1,234	1,183	1,448
	Rio de Janeiro	(Brazil)	2,685	2,172	1,876	1,516	2,023	2,077	1,903	3,239	2,388	3,514
	Salvador	(Brazil)	35	39	176	45	137	142	76	174	296	481
	Santos	(Brazil)	130	143	172	264	264	264	302	225	256	321
	São Paulo	(Brazil)	2,461	3,026	2,933	4,351	5,378	5,362	5,550	6,204	5,825	7,140
	Vitória	(Brazil)	116	162	186	173	166	222	193	255	350	521
25	Washington	(United States)	326	350	334	298	285	243	298	367	547	640

== 1980s by rate per 100,000 ==
1-25	Metropole	Division	Country	Sources	1980	1981	1982	1983	1984	1985	1986	1987	1988	1989
1	Belém	Pará	Brazil		14	15	13	17	15	14	16	15	18	20
2	Brasília		Brazil		15	15	15	15	15	20	20	20	20	20
3	Cali	Valle del Cauca	Colombia		27	33	34	33	37	57				
4	Curitiba	Paraná	Brazil		9	6	10	11	10	10	8	10	12	15
5	Dallas	Texas	United States											17
6	Detroit	Michigan	United States											18
7	Fortaleza	Ceará	Brazil		21	21	19	23	21	20	18	14	16	20
8	Goiânia	Goiás	Brazil		15	16	13	11	8	6	7	12	24	26
9	Houston	Texas	United States										18	17
10	Kingston		Jamaica						48	37	36	35	37	36
11	Los Angeles	California	United States											18
12	Maceió	Alagoas	Brazil		28	28	28	28	28	40	40	40	40	40
13	Medellín	Antioquia	Colombia		43	57	58	59	46	109				
14	Miami	Florida	United States										20	22
15	New Orleans	Louisiana	United States											25
16	New York City	New York	United States											23
17	Petrolina		Brazil		13	13	13	13	13	21	21	21	21	21
18	Porto Alegre	Rio Grande do Sul	Brazil		7	8	9	8	5	6	8	9	14	23
19	Recife	Pernambuco	Brazil		27	31	30	35	40	44	44	45	43	51
20	Rio de Janeiro	Rio de Janeiro	Brazil		30	24	20	42	50	55	59	59	68	80
21	Salvador	Bahia	Brazil		2	2	9	2	6	7	3	7	12	20
22	Santos	São Paulo	Brazil		18	18	18	18	18	22	22	22	22	22
23	São Paulo	São Paulo	Brazil		20	24	22	33	39	39	39	43	40	48
24	Vitória	Espírito Santo	Brazil		18	18	18	18	18	26	26	26	26	26
25	Washington		United States										15	17

== 1990s by count ==
1-25	Metropole	Division	Country	Sources	1990	1991	1992	1993	1994	1995	1996	1997	1998	1999
1	Belo Horizonte	Minas Gerais	Brazil		396	475	441	474	424	588	624	727	870	899
2	Bogotá	Distrito Capital	Colombia		2,258	2,698	3,231	4,378	3,664	3,385	3,296	2,810	2,483	2,409
3	Brasília		Brazil		593	680	591	717	727	802	843	827	835	844
4	Cali	Valle del Cauca	Colombia						2,498	2,267	2,187	1,794	1,871	2,181
5	Campinas	São Paulo	Brazil		265	298	355	423	451	529	13	604	826	977
6	Cúcuta	Norte de Santander	Colombia											747
7	Curitiba	Paraná	Brazil		326	284	301	364	386	434	481	611	554	658
8	Detroit	Michigan	United States							564	517	556	514	501
9	East London	Eastern Cape	South Africa						494	613	753	663	643	675
10	East Rand	Gauteng	South Africa						1,346	985	1,088	1,077	1,116	1,130
11	Fortaleza	Ceará	Brazil		374	426	376	475	438	644	589	657	493	658
12	Los Angeles	California	United States		1,768	1,856	1,919	1,944	1,669	1,682	1,401	1,175	959	891
13	Medellín	Antioquia	Colombia						5,284	5,285	5,257	4,478	4,083	4,288
14	Mexico City		Mexico		4,724	4,562	4,608	4,568	4,365	4,116	4,061	3,692	3,612	3,196
15	New York City	New York	United States		2,245					1,220	1,030	803	662	693
16	Pereira	Risaralda	Colombia											647
17	Porto Alegre	Rio Grande do Sul	Brazil		807	801	761	526	686	744	810	886	812	820
18	Pretoria	Gauteng	South Africa						483	502	483	527	549	542
19	Recife	Pernambuco	Brazil		1,602	1,552	1,392	1,482	1,390	1,487	1,643	2,240	2,788	2,568
20	Rio de Janeiro	Rio de Janeiro	Brazil		6,044	4,254	3,620	4,319	5,263	7,047	6,853	6,875	6,464	6,086
21	San Pedro Sula	Cortés	Honduras								572	741	761	896
22	Santos	São Paulo	Brazil		321	346	327	328	342	393	9	633	705	811
23	São Paulo	São Paulo	Brazil		7,419	7,520	6,912	6,887	7,535	8,903	9,247	9,202	10,122	11,499
24	Vereeniging	Gauteng	South Africa						579	690	741	673	721	605
25	Vitória	Espírito Santo	Brazil		535	595	513	747	839	827	855	1,103	1,273	1,171

== 1990s by rate per 100,000 ==
1-25	Metropole	Division	Country	Sources	1990	1991	1992	1993	1994	1995	1996	1997	1998	1999
1	Apartadó	Antioquia	Colombia											218
2	Barrancabermeja	Santander	Colombia										15	133
3	Buenaventura	Valle del Cauca	Colombia		24	24	24	45	45	45			46	119
4	Buga	Valle del Cauca	Colombia		67	67	67	94	94	94			82	85
5	Cali	Valle del Cauca	Colombia		74	74	74	106	106	106		81	82	94
6	Cape Town	Western Cape	South Africa						66	75	73	73	79	70
7	Cartago	Valle del Cauca	Colombia		39	39	39	74	74	74			73	160
8	Cúcuta	Norte de Santander	Colombia											97
9	Durban	KwaZulu-Natal	South Africa											82
10	Fusagasugá	Cundinamarca	Colombia											97
11	Kingston		Jamaica		48	46	56	54	68	49	60	88	86	77
12	La Dorada	Caldas	Colombia											65
13	Maicao	La Guajira	Colombia											75
14	Medellín	Antioquia	Colombia		264	325	284	196	192	192	188	160	141	145
15	Ocaña	Norte de Santander	Colombia		62	48	59	46	86	40	65	61	62	91
16	Palmira	Valle del Cauca	Colombia		31	31	31	47	47	47			42	68
17	Pereira	Risaralda	Colombia											102
18	Popayán	Cauca	Colombia											85
19	Recife	Pernambuco	Brazil		56	53	47	49	46	48	53	72	88	80
20	Riohacha	La Guajira	Colombia											63
21	Santa Marta	Magdalena	Colombia											63
22	São Paulo	São Paulo	Brazil		49	49	44	43	47	54	56	55	59	66
23	Tuluá	Valle del Cauca	Colombia		43	43	43	56	56	56			53	93
24	Villavicencio	Meta	Colombia											60
25	Vitória	Espírito Santo	Brazil					62	69	67	68	85	96	87

== 2000s by count ==
1-25	Metropole	Division	Country	Sources	2000	2001	2002	2003	2004	2005	2006	2007	2008	2009
1	Belém	Pará	Brazil		339	398	491	558	584	837	834	803	1,166	1,150
2	Belo Horizonte	Minas Gerais	Brazil		1,254	1,413	1,788	2,386	2,753	2,474	2,306	2,225	2,018	1,822
3	Bogotá	Distrito Capital	Colombia		2,264	2,052	1,898	1,605	1,571	1,669	1,372	1,351	1,341	1,327
4	Brasília		Brazil		1,042	1,054	1,045	1,185	1,178	1,139	1,155	1,195	1,403	1,501
5	Cali	Valle del Cauca	Colombia		2,249	2,299	2,315	2,328	2,402	1,774	1,726			
6	Cape Town	Western Cape	South Africa			2,420	2,421	2,166	1,823	2,046		2,222		
7	Ciudad Juárez	Chihuahua	Mexico		247	255	283	208	197	223	228	192	1,580	2,386
8	Curitiba	Paraná	Brazil		694	767	832	1,037	1,153	1,313	1,381	1,329	1,655	1,880
9	Durban	KwaZulu-Natal	South Africa			2,100	2,175	2,071	1,905	1,874		1,981		
10	Fortaleza	Ceará	Brazil		781	759	858	849	875	992	1,090	1,267	1,232	1,233
11	Johannesburg	Gauteng	South Africa			2,274	2,285	2,024	1,547	1,441		1,697		
12	Karachi	Sindh	Pakistan								734	841	1,142	
13	Kingston		Jamaica									1,014	936	
14	Maceió	Alagoas	Brazil		389	535	590	595	635	703	1,011	1,062	1,141	1,012
15	Manaus	Amazonas	Brazil		490	403	421	479	436	514	583	604	704	797
16	Medellín	Antioquia	Colombia		4,296	4,610	4,697	2,679	1,517	1,161				
17	Mexico City		Mexico		2,954	2,926	2,904	2,909	2,683	2,896	2,566	2,086	2,548	
18	New York City		United States		710	672	622	967	931	929	978	840	855	778
19	Porto Alegre	Rio Grande do Sul	Brazil		1,002	1,006	1,078	1,095	1,138	1,151	1,103	1,364	1,485	1,319
20	Recife	Pernambuco	Brazil		2,572	2,868	2,510	2,666	2,591	2,632	2,666	2,680	2,445	2,216
21	Rio de Janeiro	Rio de Janeiro	Brazil		6,074	6,081	7,012	6,615	6,181	5,610	5,773	4,855	4,040	3,703
22	Salvador	Bahia	Brazil		358	599	689	943	970	1,372	1,576	1,787	2,385	2,481
23	San Pedro Sula	Cortés	Honduras		969									
24	São Paulo	São Paulo	Brazil		11,321	11,214	9,855	9,517	7,378	5,613	5,028	3,812	3,625	3,535
25	Vitória	Espírito Santo	Brazil		1,059	1,074	1,216	1,200	1,241	1,164	1,291	1,329	1,334	1,324

== 2000s by rate per 100,000 ==
1-25	Metropole	Division	Country	Sources	2000	2001	2002	2003	2004	2005	2006	2007	2008	2009
1	Angra dos Reis	Rio de Janeiro	Brazil						48	58				
2	Arapiraca	Alagoas	Brazil						122	67			93	
3	Barrancabermeja	Santander	Colombia		243	192	70	56	53	64	40	36	49	61
4	Belo Horizonte	Minas Gerais	Brazil		29	32	39	52	59	51	46	44	40	
5	Buenaventura	Valle del Cauca	Colombia		165	148	115	98	95	105	145	91	62	41
6	Buga	Valle del Cauca	Colombia		84	137	104	80	107	65	75	89	88	63
7	Cabo Frio	Rio de Janeiro	Brazil						42	54			71	
8	Cali	Valle del Cauca	Colombia		94	94	93	92	91	67	64			
9	Cape Town	Western Cape	South Africa		79	78	75	66	55	60	62	64		
10	Cartago	Valle del Cauca	Colombia		146	143	160	112	127	113	76	97	107	73
11	Caruaru	Pernambuco	Brazil						68	53			70	
12	Cúcuta	Norte de Santander	Colombia					101	61	59	65	73	55	
13	Durban	KwaZulu-Natal	South Africa			63	65	61	55	54		56		
14	Garanhuns	Pernambuco	Brazil						71	64				
15	Governador Valadares	Minas Gerais	Brazil						43	56				
16	Ilhéus	Bahia	Brazil						47	61				
17	Itabuna	Bahia	Brazil						54	66			98	
18	Johannesburg	Gauteng	South Africa					52						
19	Kingston		Jamaica		70	93								
20	La Ceiba	Atlántida	Honduras										150	122
21	Macaé	Rio de Janeiro	Brazil						86	75			60	
22	Marabá	Pará	Brazil						78	91			125	
23	Teófilo Otoni	Minas Gerais	Brazil						34	52				
24	Tuluá	Valle del Cauca	Colombia		131	114							104	79
25	Vitória	Espírito Santo	Brazil		74	73	81	78	80	72	78	78	80	

== 2010s by rate ==
No.	City	Pop. 2010	Pop. 2013	Pop. 2014 (P)	Mi²	Mi² (land)	Flag(s)	2010	2011	2012	2013	2014	2015	2016	2017	2018	2019
	Acapulco	877,577	906,096	913,406	1,406	1,365	(Mexico)	56.18	133.48	150.69	107.49						
	Apartadó	153,319	167,895	173,008	232		(Colombia)	46.31	57.57	30.08	21.44	23.7					
	Atlanta	5,929,345	6,162,195		11,732	11,499	(United States)	5.97	5.7	5.9	5.53						
	Belém	2,760,061	2,872,202	2,129,515	9,242		(Brazil)	62.75	43.29	43.97	46.38	53.06					
	Belize City	66,700					(Belize)	102.1	105.1								
	Berlin	5,142,247 (2016)		5,142,247 (2016)			(Germany)	1.0 (2012)		1.0							
	Bloemfontein	747,431 (2011)			2,426		(South Africa)	42.41	40.81	44.02							
	Bogotá	8,663,946	9,057,730	9,188,131	1,888		(Colombia)	23.27	22.1	17.64	17.69	18.16					
	Buenaventura	362,764	384,504		2,629		(Colombia)	40.26	36.5	39.78	50.71						
	Buenos Aires	14,999,759			10,156		(Argentina)	7.03 (2012)		7.03							
	Buga	116,101		115,772	322		(Colombia)	71.49	46.57	88.1	83.9						
	Cabo Frio	186,227	200,380	204,486	158		(Brazil)	49.4	53.99	63.01	60.39						
	Cali	2,950,508	3,051,408	3,085,292	1,348		(Colombia)	81.41	83.38	80.03	77.83	62.72					
	Campos dos Goytacazes	463,731		402,912	1,555		(Brazil)	42.27	40.16			37.97					
	Cape Town	4,088,943	4,263,177	4,321,254	1,859		(South Africa)	42.46	42.44	48.99	55.5	59.89					
	Caracas	3,273,863 (2014)		3,273,863	1,381		(Venezuela)	124 (2011)	124	88		115.98					
	Caucasia	99,297	106,887	109,511	545		(Colombia)	186.31	141.47	19.17	60.81	57.53					
	Chicago	9,840,929			13,067	10,636	(United States)	6.27 (2011)	6.27	6.98							
	Chigorodó	67,103	72,453	74,309	264		(Colombia)	76	63.91	67.94	40.03	26.91					
	Chihuahua	882,808		868,145	7,021	6,993	(Mexico)	134.12	99.9	71.32		33.29					
	Choluteca	169,113	183,563		399		(Honduras)	24.84	43.67	34.68	34.87						
	Cleveland	3,515,646			8,943	5,880	(United States)	3.93	4.21								
	Colón	110,564	117,546	120,048	32		(El Salvador)	129.34	88.67	42.57	52.75	81.63					
	Comayagua	118,406	126,969	129,820	321		(Honduras)	103.88	113.81	97.49	110.26	82.42					
	Culiacán	819,332		910,564	2,565	2,435	(Mexico)	105.70	98.83	59.71		42.17					
	Detroit–Windsor	5,650,344				6,925	(United States) (Canada)	8.14	8.75	9.80							
	Durban	4,009,339		3,442,361	1,801		(South Africa)	39.51	38.89	39.95		34.48					
	Grahamstown	80,390 (2011)			1,689		(South Africa)	46.03	38.56	44.78							
	Guadalajara	4,546,732	4,733,832			1,215	(Mexico)	14.43	21.5	21.75							
	Houston	6,114,562			14,202	12,402	(United States)	7.28	5.53	5.63							
	Iguala	121,992				220	(Mexico)	98.37	162.42	154.95							
	João Pessoa	1,248,719	1,318,665	780,738	1,332		(Brazil)	69.51	77.69			79.14					
	Johannesburg	7,722,874			3,549		(South Africa)	31.05	26.64	26.85	30.31						
	Juárez–El Paso	2,391,466	2,448,406		6,204	6,195	(Mexico) (United States)	159.48	97.86	36.62	25.81						
	Kansas City	2,343,008			11,367	11,199	(United States)	7.64	7.11	6.73							
	Karachi	14,910,352 (2017)			1,362		(Pakistan)	7.02	8.46	10.11							
	Knysna	68,659 (2011)			428		(South Africa)	34.96	37.87	23.30							
	La Ceiba	185,831	201,838	207,161	240		(Honduras)	158.21	181.52	157.25	140.71	95.1					
	Laredo	637,578			3,842	3,826	(Mexico) (United States)	24	32.55	83.85							
	London	8,061,000	8,417,000				(United Kingdom)	1.5	1.4	1.3	1.3	1.1					
	Los Angeles	17,877,006	18,407,083		35,316	33,955	(United States)	5	4.69	4.66	4.6						
	Macaé	206,728			470		(Brazil)	52.73	42.36								
	Madrid	6,633,278 (2016)		6,633,278 (2016)			(Spain)	0.9 (2012)		0.9							
	Maicao	141,917	151,469	154,343	861		(Colombia)	64.12	73.67	66.03	48.85	28.51					
	Marabá	233,669			5,841		(Brazil)	106.56	107.24								
	Mazatlán	429,598			988	978	(Mexico)	89.39	74.9	26.48							
	Medellín	3,569,161	3,711,058	3,757,577	532		(Colombia)	78	61.43	47.71	36.3	26.08					
	Mexico City	23,426,676		24,317,538	4,378	4,357	(Mexico)	14.09	16.11	17.13		11.57					
	Miami	6,166,766	6,482,340		9,087	7,464	(United States)	6.36	6	5.9	6.2						
	Monterrey	4,192,609			2,749	2,747	(Mexico)	20.87	48.10	40.17							
	Montreal	3,934,078 (2011)			2,306		(Canada)	1.33				0.95					
	Moscow	13,500,000	16,600,000				(Russia)	8.87	7.11	6.65	5.72						
	Newcastle	63,236 (2011)			716		(South Africa)	22.3	21.2	23.4							
	New York City	23,076,664	23,484,225		15,338	12,247	(United States)	4.48	4.3	3.78	3.43						
	Paris	12,006,868 (2016)		12,006,868 (2016)			(France)	1.8 (2012)		1.8							
	Philadelphia	7,067,807			8,504	7,336	(United States)	7.4	7.7	8.12							
	Pietermaritzburg	618,085	619,439		245		(South Africa)	45.95	33.95	39.74	33.9						
	Porto Seguro	126,929			930		(Brazil)	126.05	105.93								
	Porto Velho	428,527			13,165		(Brazil)	49.94	43.38								
	Pretoria	2,518,404			2,432		(South Africa)	24.38	17.76	17.18							
	Quibdó	114,524	115,290	115,517	2,329		(Colombia)	61.98	61.85	110.38	93.68	70.99					
	Rio de Janeiro	12,578,485	12,823,083	12,878,700	3,960		(Brazil)	37.23	30.31		33.3	35.38					
	Rionegro	110,329	116,289	118,264	76		(Colombia)	49.85	60.55	45.49	31.82	45.66					
	Sabanalarga	92,539	95,966	97,076	153		(Colombia)	18.37	19.9	16.87	20.84	17.51					
	St. Louis	2,927,675			9,875	9,647	(United States)	7.4 (2011)	7.4								
	Salvador	4,215,432	4,572,986	3,919,864	4,335		(Brazil)	67.73	61.95	66.89		54.31					
	San Diego–Tijuana	4,864,858	5,090,464	5,172,505	6,235	5,914	(United States) (Mexico)	16.61	11.49	9.72		11.68					
	San Francisco	8,153,696	8,469,854		11,617	10,132	(United States)	5.07	5.7	5.7							
	San Miguel	239,881	247,119	249,638			(El Salvador)	89.21	80.92	40.06	32.78	36.05					
	San Pedro Sula	1,197,183	1,292,508	1,322,748	711		(Honduras)	122.62	142.1	146.37	146.46	114.46					
	San Salvador	1,810,840	1,822,921	1,826,509	286		(El Salvador)	75.32	78.78	34.25	40.76	63.84					
	Santa Ana	260,913	264,091	265,518			(El Salvador)	85.47	105.04	42.23	27.26	39.92					
	Santa Marta	447,963	469,066	476,385	919		(Colombia)	41.75	42.87	51.96	42.64	22.04					
	São Paulo	21,468,536	22,669,963		4,222		(Brazil)	16.93	15.71	18.39	15.9						
	Siguatepeque	85,213	92,819	95,407	234		(Honduras)	70.41	92	107.47	78.65	81.76					
	Sonsonate	72,914	72,158	72,015	90		(El Salvador)	138.52	177.69	55.28	23.56	45.82					
	Tegucigalpa	1,134,183	1,203,370	1,225,613	562		(Honduras)	91.78	99.43	87.91	85.43	81.1					
	Tocoa	86,039 (2013)	86,039	87,626			(Honduras)	125.55 (2012)		125.55	137.15	102.71					
	Toronto	5,583,064 (2011)			2,750		(Canada)	1.43				1.38					
	Torreón	1,259,007					(Mexico)		58.6								
	Tuluá	199,264	206,610	209,086	345		(Colombia)	79.3	83.3	107.28	71.63	65.05					
	Tumaco	179,005	191,218	195,419	293		(Colombia)	136.87	136.06	140.04	112.96	72.66					
	Usulután	76,922	79,568	80,467	54		(El Salvador)	70.2	74.55	54.65	43.99	72.08					
	Vancouver	2,313,328 (2011)			1,000		(Canada)	1.54				1.83					
	Vereeniging	769,000 (2020)			1,701		(South Africa)	33.5	30.53	28.75							
	Washington–Baltimore	9,051,961	9,443,180		14,220	12,209	(United States)	6.55	5.74	5.22							
	Welkom	406,104	407,176		1,991		(South Africa)	48.26	58.06	62.93	62.14						
	Worcester	166,825 (2007)			1,480		(South Africa)	43.16	44.96	40.76							

== 2010s by count ==
No.	City	Flag(s)	2010	2011	2012	2013	2014	2015	2016 (P)
	Acapulco	(Mexico)		1,055; 1,186	1,278; 1,353	989; 974	638; 635	986; 1,110	1,001; 1,101
	Acapulco	(Mexico)	493	1,186; 1,055	1,353; 1,278	974; 989	635; 638	1,110; 986	1,101; 1,001
	Atlanta	(United States)	354	342	359	341			
	Belém	(Brazil)	1,732; 1,904	1,208; 1,585	1,240; 1,651	1,332			
	Belém	(Brazil)	1,904; 1,732	1,585; 1,208	1,651; 1,240	1,332			
	Belize City	(Belize)	70	74					
	Bloemfontein	(South Africa)	317	305	329	286	304	315	
	Bogotá	(Colombia)	2,016	1,944	1,575	1,602	1,669		
	Buenaventura	(Colombia)	133; 146	129; 135	132; 150	182; 195	147; 161	77; 84	59
	Buenaventura	(Colombia)	146; 137	135; 142	150; 142	195; 178	161; 144	84; 86	65
	Buenaventura	(Colombia)	137; 133	142; 129	142; 132	178; 182	144; 147	86; 77	
	Buenos Aires	(Argentina)			1,054	1,432	1,559		
	Buga	(Colombia)	74; 83	43; 54	100; 102	94; 97	80; 80	87; 87	66
	Buga	(Colombia)	83; 98	54; 61	102; 115	97; 98	80; 82	87; 88	71
	Buga	(Colombia)	98; 74	61; 43	115; 100	98; 94	82; 80	88; 87	
	Cabo Frio	(Brazil)	92	103	123	121			
	Cali	(Colombia)	2,087; 2,402	2,402; 2,488	2,420; 2,415	2,426; 2,375	1,938; 1,935	1,838; 1,873	1,746
	Cali	(Colombia)	2,402; 2,578	2,488; 2,642	2,415; 2,542	2,375; 2,483	1,935; 2,032	1,873; 1,971	1,767
	Cali	(Colombia)	2,578; 2,087	2,642; 2,402	2,542; 2,420	2,483; 2,426	2,032; 1,938	1,971; 1,838	
	Campos dos Goytacazes	(Brazil)	196	188	222	227	226	193	
	Cape Town	(South Africa)	1,733	1,757	2,056	2,374	2,628	2,608	2,693
	Caracas	(Venezuela)		4,999	3,804				
	Caucasia	(Colombia)	114; 185	46; 144	27; 20	55; 65	57; 63	45; 37	37
	Caucasia	(Colombia)	185; 138	144; 82	20; 31	65; 66	63; 48	37; 41	24
	Caucasia	(Colombia)	138; 114	82; 46	31; 27	66; 55	48; 57	41; 45	
	Chicago	(United States)		618	691				
	Chigorodó	(Colombia)	51	44	48	29	20		
	Chihuahua	(Mexico)							289; 1,438
	Chihuahua	(Mexico)	1,185	898	651	457	334	887	1,438; 289
	Choluteca	(Honduras)	42	76	62	64	37		
	Cleveland	(United States)	138	148	158				
	Colón	(El Salvador)	143	100	49	62	98		
	Comayagua	(Honduras)	123	138	121	140	107		
	Culiacán	(Mexico)	866	813	493	462	492	523	590
	Detroit–Toledo–Windsor (was Detroit–Windsor before 2012)	(United States) (Canada)	460	493	596	518	450	479	500
	Durban	(South Africa)	1,580	1,534	1,577	1,667	1,792	1,772	
	Grahamstown	(South Africa)	37	31	36				
	Guadalajara	(Mexico)		723; 991	719; 1,016	687; 1,029	591; 712	664; 1,128	747
	Guadalajara	(Mexico)	656	991; 723	1,016; 719	1,029; 687	712; 591	1,128; 664	
	Houston	(United States)	433	330	349	373	377	458	487
	Iguala	(Mexico)	120	195	183				
	João Pessoa	(Brazil)	858	967	872	844	806	792	
	Johannesburg (became Johannesburg–Pretoria–Vereeniging in 2015)	(South Africa)	2,389	2,259	2,284	2,582	2,821	3,869	4,124
	Juárez–El Paso	(Mexico) (United States)	3,814	2,348	892	632			
	Kansas City	(United States)	179	167	160				
	Karachi	(Pakistan)	1,485	1,789	2,137				
	Knysna	(South Africa)	24	26	16	12			
	La Ceiba	(Honduras)	294	347	309	284	197		
	Los Angeles	(United States)	893	841	850	847	810	869	938
	Macaé	(Brazil)	109	90					
	Maicao	(Colombia)	91	107	98	74	44		
	Marabá	(Brazil)	249	256					
	Mazatlán	(Mexico)	384	325	116	109	105	162	371
	Medellín	(Colombia)	2,784	2,222	1,748	1,347	980		
	Mexico City	(Mexico)				2,346; 3,822	2,474; 3,447	2,626; 3,369	2,746
	Mexico City	(Mexico)	2,792	3,322	3,449	3,822; 2,346	3,447; 2,474	3,369; 2,626	
	Miami	(United States)	370	344	364	383	419	399	355
	Monterrey	(Mexico)		1,679; 2,047	1,314; 1,734	617; 868	420; 542	384; 471	548
	Monterrey	(Mexico)	875	2,047; 1,679	1,734; 1,314	868; 617	542; 420	471; 384	
	Moscow	(Russia)	1,198	1,138	1,071	950			
	Newcastle	(South Africa)	81	77	85				
	New York City	(United States)	1,012	958	823	740	687	744	715
	Nuevo Laredo	(Mexico)	142	201	546	172	69	97	107
	Philadelphia	(United States)	523	545	579				
	Pietermaritzburg	(South Africa)	284	210	246	210	228	252	
	Port Elizabeth	(South Africa)	517	562	515	547	541	674	660
	Porto Seguro	(Brazil)		108; 137	133; 152	129; 139	140; 154	98; 134	95
	Porto Seguro	(Brazil)	160	137; 108	152; 133	139; 129	154; 140	134; 98	
	Porto Velho	(Brazil)	214	189					
	Pretoria (merged with Johannesburg–Pretoria–Vereeniging in 2015)	(South Africa)	613	518	500	518	574		
	Quibdó	(Colombia)	71	71	127	108	82		
	Rio de Janeiro	(Brazil)	4,854; 4,683	4,049; 3,837	3,708; 3,768	4,260; 4,025	4,541; 4,310	3,992; 3,995	4,884
	Rio de Janeiro	(Brazil)	4,683; 4,854	3,837; 4,049	3,768; 3,708	4,025; 4,260	4,310; 4,541	3,995; 3,992	
	Rionegro	(Colombia)	55	68	52	37	54		
	Sabanalarga	(Colombia)	17	17	16	20	17		
	St. Louis	(United States)		217					
	Salvador	(Brazil)	2,855	2,635	2,870				
	San Diego–Tijuana	(United States) (Mexico)	808; 1,393	569; 679	488; 475	647; 650	604		
	San Diego–Tijuana	(United States) (Mexico)	1,393; 808	679; 569	475; 488	650; 647	604		
	San Francisco	(United States)	413	466	477				
	San Miguel	(El Salvador)	214	196	98	81	90		
	San Pedro Sula	(Honduras)	1,468	1,747	1,846	1,893	1,514		
	San Salvador	(El Salvador)	1,364	1,430	623	743	1,166	2,057	1,577
	Santa Ana	(El Salvador)	223	275	111	72	106		
	Santa Marta	(Colombia)	187	195	240	200	105		
	São Paulo	(Brazil)	3,634	3,398	4,005	3,604			
	Siguatepeque	(Honduras)	60	81	97	73	78		
	Sonsonate	(El Salvador)	101	129	40	17	33		
	Tegucigalpa	(Honduras)	1,041	1,151	1,038	1,028	994		
	Tijuana	(Mexico)	741; 1,326	487; 597	381; 368	576; 579	530; 516	750; 705	1,069; 974
	Tijuana	(Mexico)	1,326; 741	597; 487	368; 381	579; 576	516; 530	705; 750	974; 1,069
	Tocoa	(Honduras)			106	118	90		
	Torreón	(Mexico)		747					
	Tuluá	(Colombia)	158	168	219	148	136		
	Tumaco	(Colombia)	245	249	262	216	142		
	Usulután	(El Salvador)	54	58	43	35	58		
	Vereeniging (merged with Johannesburg–Pretoria–Vereeniging in 2015)	(South Africa)	281	255	242	254	304		
	Washington–Baltimore	(United States)	593	522	487				
	Welkom	(South Africa)	196	236	256	253	230	240	229
83	Worcester	(South Africa)	72	75	68	75			

== See also ==
- List of countries by intentional homicide rate
- List of cities by murder rate
- List of United States cities by crime rate (2012). 250,000+
- United States cities by crime rate (100,000–250,000)
- United States cities by crime rate (60,000-100,000)
- List of federal subjects of Russia by murder rate
- List of Brazilian states by murder rate
- List of Mexican states by homicides
- List of Canada cities by crime severity index
