= List of United States cities by crime rate =

The following table of United States cities by crime rate is based on Federal Bureau of Investigation Uniform Crime Reports (UCR) statistics from 2024 for the 200 most populous cities in America that have reported data to the FBI UCR system.

The population numbers are based on U.S. Census estimates for the year end. The number of murders includes nonnegligent manslaughter. This list is based on the reporting. In most cases, the city and the reporting agency are identical. However, in Nashville and Las Vegas, the reporting agency has more than one municipality.

The combined table for 2024 does not include data for some large cities, such as Jacksonville, Atlanta, New Orleans, and Orlando. Their data is presented separately, based on reports from previous years. More recent data can be accessed on the FBI site.

== Note about population ==
Often, one obtains very different results depending on whether crime rates are measured for the city jurisdiction or the metropolitan area.

Information is voluntarily submitted by each jurisdiction and some jurisdictions do not appear in the table because they either did not submit data or they did not meet deadlines.

The FBI document on the UCR methodology has the following disclaimer on population estimates:

For population estimates, the FBI computed individual rates of growth from one year to the next for every city/town and county using the current decennial counts through the most recent population estimates available from the U.S. Census Bureau. Each agency’s rates of growth were averaged; that average was then applied and added to its most recent Census population estimate to derive the agency’s current year population estimate. Population totals for 2010 are from the U.S. Census Bureau’s decennial population counts.

== Crime rates ==
| State | City | Popul. | Yearly Crime Rates per 100,000 people | | | | | | | | | | |
| State | City | Popul. | Total | Violent crime | | | | | Arson^{1} | Property crime | | | |
| State | City | Popul. | Total | Murder and Nonnegligent manslaughter | Rape | Robbery | Aggravated assault | Total | Arson^{1} | Burglary | Larceny theft | Motor vehicle theft | Total |
|---|---|---|---|---|---|---|---|---|---|---|---|---|---|
| Alabama | Birmingham | 195,419 | 5330.62 | 58.85 | 14.84 | 201.11 | 971.76 | 1246.56 | 52.71 | 729.72 | 2493.63 | 808.01 | 4031.36 |
| Alabama | Huntsville | 228,697 | 2878.92 | 8.31 | 48.54 | 53.78 | 372.55 | 483.17 | 7.43 | 321.39 | 1808.94 | 257.98 | 2388.31 |
| Alabama | Mobile | 237,092 | 2429.86 | 16.45 | 26.15 | 52.72 | 656.71 | 752.03 | 3.37 | 313.38 | 1188.57 | 172.51 | 1674.46 |
| Alabama | Montgomery | 193,728 | 2830.26 | 18.07 | 6.19 | 191.51 | 378.88 | 594.65 | 0.52 | 527.03 | 1341.06 | 367.01 | 2235.09 |
| Alaska | Anchorage | 286,958 | 3811.01 | 9.41 | 161.00 | 166.92 | 677.45 | 1014.78 | 30.32 | 317.12 | 2025.73 | 423.06 | 2765.91 |
| Arizona | Chandler | 281,117 | 1641.67 | 0.71 | 17.43 | 23.48 | 91.78 | 133.40 | 3.91 | 120.59 | 1292.34 | 91.42 | 1504.36 |
| Arizona | Gilbert | 277,527 | 1103.68 | 0.36 | 23.42 | 10.81 | 97.65 | 132.24 | 3.24 | 79.63 | 826.23 | 62.34 | 968.19 |
| Arizona | Glendale | 255,512 | 3170.89 | 7.83 | 57.53 | 65.36 | 357.71 | 488.43 | 11.74 | 312.31 | 1920.07 | 438.34 | 2670.72 |
| Arizona | Mesa | 513,585 | 1955.28 | 2.73 | 44.20 | 50.24 | 385.53 | 482.69 | 7.98 | 187.70 | 1078.50 | 198.41 | 1464.61 |
| Arizona | Peoria | 201,056 | 1468.75 | 1.49 | 43.27 | 24.37 | 185.52 | 254.66 | 8.95 | 150.70 | 906.71 | 147.72 | 1205.14 |
| Arizona | Phoenix | 1,662,809 | 3138.54 | 8.36 | 64.29 | 181.62 | 545.34 | 799.61 | 13.59 | 317.17 | 1582.14 | 426.03 | 2325.34 |
| Arizona | Scottsdale | 245,237 | 2030.69 | 0.41 | 33.84 | 22.02 | 96.23 | 152.51 | 2.85 | 182.27 | 1534.84 | 158.21 | 1875.33 |
| Arizona | Surprise | 163,202 | 992.02 | 7.35 | 16.54 | 11.03 | 74.14 | 109.07 | 7.35 | 94.36 | 681.98 | 99.26 | 875.60 |
| Arizona | Tempe | 191,376 | 3371.37 | 2.61 | 71.59 | 66.36 | 329.72 | 470.28 | 7.32 | 334.42 | 2257.86 | 301.50 | 2893.78 |
| Arizona | Tucson | 548,789 | 3921.91 | 6.74 | 47.74 | 108.06 | 426.21 | 588.75 | 20.04 | 296.84 | 2500.60 | 515.68 | 3313.11 |
| Arkansas | Little Rock | 204,247 | 6916.14 | 17.63 | 115.06 | 217.87 | 1321.44 | 1672.00 | 29.87 | 937.10 | 3823.80 | 453.37 | 5214.27 |
| California | Anaheim | 338,488 | 2743.67 | 3.55 | 50.22 | 105.17 | 437.24 | 596.18 | 15.36 | 348.02 | 1432.84 | 351.27 | 2132.13 |
| California | Bakersfield | 416,120 | 3028.45 | 6.73 | 40.85 | 125.68 | 381.38 | 554.65 | 4.09 | 537.59 | 1259.01 | 673.12 | 2469.72 |
| California | Chula Vista | 273,843 | 1520.94 | 1.10 | 19.35 | 82.16 | 273.15 | 375.76 | 12.78 | 134.38 | 666.44 | 331.58 | 1132.40 |
| California | Corona | 161,174 | 1982.33 | 1.24 | 27.30 | 63.29 | 157.59 | 249.42 | 9.31 | 243.84 | 1271.92 | 207.85 | 1723.60 |
| California | Elk Grove | 179,074 | 1426.78 | 1.68 | 20.66 | 50.26 | 117.27 | 189.87 | 5.03 | 110.57 | 996.24 | 125.09 | 1231.89 |
| California | Escondido | 147,170 | 1935.86 | 1.36 | 17.67 | 112.12 | 302.37 | 433.51 | 16.99 | 222.87 | 1050.49 | 212.00 | 1485.36 |
| California | Fontana | 217,605 | 1492.15 | 0.92 | 22.06 | 56.06 | 191.17 | 270.21 | 5.51 | 146.60 | 794.10 | 275.73 | 1216.42 |
| California | Fremont | 224,820 | 2541.59 | 2.67 | 16.01 | 64.50 | 112.53 | 195.71 | 18.24 | 342.94 | 1444.71 | 539.99 | 2327.64 |
| California | Fresno | 546,722 | 4045.38 | 5.85 | 44.63 | 167.91 | 517.08 | 735.47 | 38.59 | 396.18 | 2204.05 | 671.09 | 3271.32 |
| California | Fullerton | 137,942 | 2493.08 | 0.72 | 32.62 | 90.62 | 331.30 | 455.26 | 13.77 | 326.95 | 1486.86 | 210.23 | 2024.04 |
| California | Garden Grove | 167,041 | 2049.80 | 0.60 | 14.97 | 65.85 | 195.16 | 276.58 | 14.37 | 307.71 | 1175.16 | 275.98 | 1758.85 |
| California | Glendale | 184,180 | 2331.96 | 2.17 | 18.46 | 93.39 | 173.20 | 287.22 | 17.92 | 201.98 | 1594.64 | 230.21 | 2026.82 |
| California | Hayward | 153,419 | 4155.94 | 7.82 | 46.93 | 174.03 | 248.34 | 477.12 | 22.16 | 364.36 | 1915.67 | 1376.62 | 3656.65 |
| California | Huntington Beach | 190,081 | 2212.74 | 2.63 | 34.72 | 51.03 | 118.90 | 207.28 | 16.31 | 200.97 | 1644.04 | 144.15 | 1989.15 |
| California | Irvine | 316,764 | 1479.02 | 1.58 | 13.26 | 22.10 | 47.04 | 83.97 | 5.37 | 197.94 | 1121.97 | 69.77 | 1389.68 |
| California | Lancaster | 164,012 | 2787.60 | 17.68 | 46.95 | 171.94 | 598.13 | 834.70 | 32.31 | 384.73 | 683.49 | 852.38 | 1920.59 |
| California | Long Beach | 444,232 | 4185.88 | 8.33 | 45.02 | 222.63 | 400.47 | 676.45 | 30.61 | 704.81 | 1795.68 | 978.32 | 3478.81 |
| California | Los Angeles^{2} | 3,796,352 | 2223.13 | 6.95 | 40.30 | 209.86 | 471.37 | 728.49 | 10.72 | 372.78 | 851.50 | 259.64 | 1483.92 |
| California | Modesto | 218,990 | 3128.00 | 3.20 | 56.17 | 113.25 | 483.13 | 655.74 | 57.54 | 267.14 | 1818.80 | 328.78 | 2414.72 |
| California | Moreno Valley | 213,581 | 1940.25 | 3.28 | 8.90 | 85.21 | 175.11 | 272.50 | 1.87 | 234.10 | 1171.92 | 259.85 | 1665.88 |
| California | Oakland | 435,042 | 9181.87 | 18.62 | 68.04 | 680.39 | 1158.28 | 1925.33 | 26.20 | 786.82 | 4164.66 | 2278.86 | 7230.34 |
| California | Oceanside | 168,725 | 2143.72 | 2.37 | 30.23 | 85.35 | 340.79 | 458.73 | 13.04 | 308.19 | 1164.02 | 199.73 | 1671.95 |
| California | Ontario | 184,763 | 2102.15 | 2.16 | 43.84 | 77.40 | 148.84 | 272.24 | 12.45 | 238.68 | 1113.32 | 465.46 | 1817.46 |
| California | Orange | 137,970 | 1524.97 | 0.00 | 12.32 | 76.83 | 136.99 | 226.14 | 10.87 | 357.32 | 703.05 | 227.59 | 1287.96 |
| California | Oxnard | 197,361 | 2500.49 | 3.04 | 32.93 | 118.56 | 441.83 | 596.37 | 26.85 | 200.65 | 1315.36 | 361.27 | 1877.27 |
| California | Palmdale | 158,983 | 2440.51 | 5.66 | 28.30 | 151.59 | 365.45 | 551.00 | 24.53 | 250.97 | 1095.71 | 518.29 | 1864.98 |
| California | Pomona | 143,726 | 3488.58 | 8.35 | 42.44 | 217.78 | 447.38 | 715.95 | 19.48 | 420.24 | 1740.12 | 592.79 | 2753.16 |
| California | Rancho Cucamonga | 174,313 | 2115.73 | 1.15 | 20.65 | 63.68 | 208.25 | 293.72 | 10.90 | 273.07 | 1316.60 | 221.44 | 1811.11 |
| California | Riverside | 320,148 | 3450.90 | 3.12 | 54.04 | 120.26 | 412.31 | 589.73 | 29.05 | 396.07 | 1984.39 | 451.67 | 2832.13 |
| California | Roseville | 162,841 | 1656.83 | 1.23 | 37.46 | 68.78 | 111.77 | 219.23 | 17.19 | 138.79 | 1178.45 | 103.17 | 1420.40 |
| California | Sacramento | 526,670 | 3331.69 | 8.54 | 34.56 | 192.15 | 519.68 | 754.93 | 29.43 | 441.64 | 1596.07 | 509.62 | 2547.33 |
| California | Salinas | 158,233 | 2227.73 | 3.79 | 51.19 | 140.93 | 328.63 | 524.54 | 27.81 | 146.62 | 1158.42 | 370.34 | 1675.38 |
| California | San Bernardino | 224,283 | 3817.94 | 11.15 | 49.94 | 241.21 | 594.78 | 897.08 | 23.18 | 455.23 | 1677.35 | 765.10 | 2897.68 |
| California | San Diego | 1,389,024 | 2092.04 | 2.52 | 21.38 | 77.39 | 310.94 | 412.23 | 9.79 | 187.40 | 1087.09 | 395.53 | 1670.02 |
| California | San Francisco | 802,856 | 4558.73 | 4.36 | 34.88 | 267.17 | 290.09 | 596.50 | 33.13 | 637.47 | 2618.90 | 672.72 | 3929.10 |
| California | San Jose | 956,840 | 3210.05 | 2.72 | 77.34 | 140.78 | 385.96 | 606.79 | 15.36 | 427.03 | 1523.24 | 637.62 | 2587.89 |
| California | Santa Ana | 310,304 | 2203.00 | 4.83 | 52.53 | 106.03 | 329.68 | 493.06 | 7.73 | 225.59 | 1160.47 | 316.14 | 1702.20 |
| California | Santa Clarita | 221,303 | 1351.54 | 0.90 | 12.65 | 42.48 | 109.35 | 165.38 | 9.49 | 195.66 | 782.19 | 198.82 | 1176.67 |
| California | Santa Rosa | 175,147 | 1677.45 | 1.14 | 67.37 | 66.80 | 207.25 | 342.57 | 14.84 | 231.23 | 919.23 | 169.57 | 1320.03 |
| California | Stockton | 319,069 | 3836.16 | 15.98 | 40.43 | 336.29 | 753.13 | 1145.83 | 50.77 | 562.26 | 1472.10 | 605.20 | 2639.55 |
| California | Sunnyvale | 150,893 | 2175.71 | 0.66 | 27.17 | 57.66 | 159.05 | 244.54 | 21.87 | 306.84 | 1317.49 | 284.97 | 1909.30 |
| California | Torrance | 136,899 | 3095.71 | 0.00 | 27.03 | 115.41 | 168.74 | 311.18 | 8.77 | 479.19 | 1819.59 | 476.99 | 2775.77 |
| California | Victorville | 140,309 | 3192.24 | 7.84 | 63.43 | 170.34 | 774.01 | 1015.62 | 47.75 | 354.22 | 1154.59 | 620.06 | 2128.87 |
| California | Visalia | 146,090 | 2586.08 | 4.79 | 67.77 | 94.46 | 268.33 | 435.35 | 20.54 | 262.85 | 1518.93 | 348.42 | 2130.19 |
| Colorado | Aurora | 397,852 | 4074.38 | 10.31 | 73.39 | 136.23 | 727.91 | 947.84 | 22.62 | 371.24 | 1836.11 | 896.56 | 3103.92 |
| Colorado | Colorado Springs | 491,474 | 4193.91 | 7.73 | 101.33 | 77.52 | 529.02 | 715.60 | 29.50 | 529.83 | 2227.38 | 691.59 | 3448.81 |
| Colorado | Denver | 722,031 | 5773.02 | 9.83 | 93.62 | 176.17 | 713.40 | 993.03 | 18.42 | 708.00 | 2821.62 | 1231.94 | 4761.57 |
| Colorado | Fort Collins | 170,509 | 2442.10 | 1.76 | 22.87 | 24.63 | 223.45 | 272.71 | 14.08 | 228.73 | 1742.43 | 184.15 | 2155.31 |
| Colorado | Lakewood | 155,868 | 5899.86 | 2.57 | 59.67 | 137.94 | 587.04 | 787.20 | 19.25 | 588.32 | 3732.00 | 773.09 | 5093.41 |
| Colorado | Thornton | 145,847 | 3129.31 | 1.37 | 79.54 | 49.37 | 143.30 | 273.57 | 19.88 | 277.00 | 2067.92 | 490.93 | 2835.85 |
| Connecticut | Bridgeport | 148,132 | 1861.85 | 8.10 | 41.85 | 153.24 | 189.70 | 392.89 | 0.00 | 224.12 | 771.61 | 473.23 | 1468.96 |
| Connecticut | New Haven | 137,243 | 4132.09 | 10.93 | 32.06 | 180.70 | 311.13 | 534.82 | 10.20 | 377.43 | 2402.31 | 807.33 | 3587.07 |
| Connecticut | Stamford | 136,483 | 1385.52 | 0.73 | 10.99 | 37.37 | 108.44 | 157.53 | 2.93 | 151.67 | 890.22 | 183.17 | 1225.06 |
| District of Columbia | Washington | 702,250 | 4513.92 | 25.49 | 34.03 | 438.59 | 427.77 | 925.88 | 0.00 | 237.95 | 2594.52 | 755.57 | 3588.04 |
| Florida^{3} | Coral Springs | 135,157 | 1231.16 | 2.96 | 26.64 | 19.98 | 87.31 | 136.88 | 0.74 | 81.39 | 987.00 | 25.16 | 1093.54 |
| Florida^{3} | Gainesville | 147,022 | 3450.50 | 4.76 | 85.70 | 133.31 | 514.21 | 737.98 | 8.84 | 307.44 | 2292.85 | 103.39 | 2703.68 |
| Florida^{3} | Miami | 460,392 | 3478.34 | 6.08 | 23.46 | 95.35 | 348.40 | 473.29 | 9.99 | 294.31 | 2290.44 | 410.30 | 2995.06 |
| Florida^{3} | Palm Bay | 141,137 | 1366.76 | 7.79 | 47.47 | 51.72 | 240.19 | 347.18 | 2.13 | 229.56 | 724.83 | 63.06 | 1017.45 |
| Florida^{3} | St. Petersburg | 264,999 | 3083.03 | 6.79 | 43.40 | 81.51 | 487.93 | 619.62 | 4.53 | 209.43 | 2029.82 | 219.62 | 2458.88 |
| Florida^{3} | Tampa | 408,646 | 1916.57 | 8.81 | 41.85 | 58.98 | 335.01 | 444.64 | 6.61 | 167.38 | 1154.54 | 143.40 | 1465.33 |
| Georgia | Columbus | 201,061 | 2842.42 | 12.93 | 25.37 | 50.73 | 514.77 | 603.80 | 2.98 | 353.62 | 1635.82 | 246.19 | 2235.64 |
| Georgia | Savannah | 241,780 | 20.27 | 9.51 | 10.34 | 0.00 | 0.41 | 20.27 | 0.00 | 0.00 | 0.00 | 0.00 | 0.00 |
| Hawaii | Honolulu | 992,973 | 1993.21 | 1.51 | 29.61 | 51.46 | 102.62 | 185.20 | 18.43 | 151.36 | 1271.13 | 367.08 | 1789.58 |
| Idaho | Boise | 235,223 | 1415.68 | 1.28 | 71.00 | 15.73 | 205.76 | 293.76 | 11.90 | 107.13 | 872.79 | 130.09 | 1110.01 |
| Idaho | Meridian | 140,353 | 722.46 | 0.71 | 29.92 | 10.69 | 105.45 | 146.77 | 4.27 | 52.01 | 482.36 | 37.05 | 571.42 |
| Illinois | Aurora | 176,688 | 1521.89 | 0.57 | 56.60 | 36.22 | 172.62 | 266.01 | 3.96 | 253.55 | 739.16 | 259.21 | 1251.92 |
| Illinois | Chicago | 2,638,698 | 4029.75 | 17.47 | 58.78 | 335.28 | 128.32 | 539.85 | 17.51 | 294.77 | 2318.76 | 858.87 | 3472.39 |
| Illinois | Joliet | 150,569 | 1601.26 | 0.00 | 48.48 | 35.20 | 266.32 | 350.01 | 6.64 | 389.85 | 704.00 | 150.76 | 1244.61 |
| Illinois | Naperville | 150,521 | 967.97 | 0.66 | 29.90 | 15.28 | 37.87 | 83.71 | 0.66 | 65.77 | 755.38 | 62.45 | 883.60 |
| Illinois | Rockford | 145,280 | 3627.48 | 13.08 | 69.52 | 106.69 | 890.69 | 1079.98 | 30.29 | 632.57 | 1444.80 | 439.84 | 2517.21 |
| Indiana | Fort Wayne | 271,892 | 2551.38 | 11.03 | 42.66 | 54.80 | 198.98 | 307.48 | 20.23 | 217.37 | 1741.50 | 264.81 | 2223.68 |
| Indiana | Indianapolis | 890,685 | 4237.08 | 19.98 | 59.17 | 143.15 | 655.56 | 877.86 | 23.13 | 517.92 | 2072.11 | 746.06 | 3336.08 |
| Iowa | Cedar Rapids | 135,363 | 2957.23 | 0.74 | 11.08 | 30.29 | 219.41 | 261.52 | 6.65 | 274.08 | 2202.97 | 212.02 | 2689.07 |
| Iowa | Des Moines | 209,245 | 3845.73 | 4.30 | 51.14 | 75.03 | 572.53 | 703.00 | 16.25 | 462.62 | 2141.99 | 521.88 | 3126.48 |
| Kansas | Kansas City | 153,363 | 4655.62 | 12.39 | 67.81 | 93.89 | 873.09 | 1047.19 | 1.96 | 442.74 | 2271.73 | 892.00 | 3606.48 |
| Kansas | Olathe | 149,473 | 1141.34 | 2.01 | 34.12 | 10.04 | 149.86 | 196.02 | 4.01 | 64.89 | 772.71 | 103.70 | 941.31 |
| Kansas | Overland Park | 196,875 | 1950.98 | 0.00 | 20.83 | 19.30 | 144.25 | 184.38 | 5.08 | 111.75 | 1385.65 | 264.13 | 1761.52 |
| Kansas | Wichita | 395,486 | 2861.29 | 8.34 | 33.12 | 49.81 | 447.30 | 538.58 | 19.72 | 262.71 | 1790.96 | 249.31 | 2302.99 |
| Kentucky | Lexington | 323,254 | 2540.73 | 4.95 | 51.66 | 79.50 | 125.91 | 262.02 | 4.33 | 264.81 | 1728.36 | 281.20 | 2274.37 |
| Kentucky | Louisville Metro | 676,843 | 4055.45 | 21.72 | 30.73 | 128.24 | 526.71 | 707.40 | 21.87 | 455.64 | 2086.60 | 783.93 | 3326.18 |
| Louisiana | Shreveport | 175,092 | 5233.25 | 26.84 | 83.38 | 79.96 | 1038.31 | 1228.50 | 14.28 | 781.30 | 2628.90 | 580.27 | 3990.47 |
| Maryland | Baltimore | 569,997 | 5783.65 | 23.33 | 47.01 | 401.72 | 844.56 | 1316.12 | 20.47 | 523.80 | 2581.92 | 1051.30 | 4157.02 |
| Massachusetts | Boston | 659,049 | 2652.61 | 3.64 | 25.64 | 126.39 | 472.20 | 627.87 | 3.03 | 177.68 | 1687.43 | 156.59 | 2021.70 |
| Massachusetts | Springfield | 155,491 | 3755.84 | 10.93 | 46.95 | 209.02 | 624.47 | 891.37 | 28.94 | 313.84 | 1856.70 | 664.99 | 2835.53 |
| Massachusetts | Worcester | 212,425 | 16.48 | 7.53 | 0.00 | 0.94 | 8.00 | 16.48 | 0.00 | 0.00 | 0.00 | 0.00 | 0.00 |
| Michigan | Detroit | 651,171 | 6147.85 | 31.17 | 92.91 | 183.52 | 1473.65 | 1781.25 | 61.27 | 703.04 | 2343.93 | 1258.35 | 4305.32 |
| Michigan | Grand Rapids | 195,913 | 3416.31 | 6.13 | 89.84 | 116.38 | 697.76 | 910.10 | 25.52 | 267.47 | 1828.87 | 384.35 | 2480.69 |
| Michigan | Warren | 135,843 | 2111.26 | 5.15 | 76.56 | 35.33 | 424.76 | 541.80 | 15.46 | 204.65 | 997.48 | 351.88 | 1554.00 |
| Minnesota | Minneapolis | 423,282 | 6329.59 | 17.95 | 89.07 | 371.86 | 681.34 | 1160.22 | 26.46 | 618.74 | 2977.45 | 1546.72 | 5142.91 |
| Minnesota | St. Paul | 304,051 | 3506.32 | 8.55 | 65.78 | 119.06 | 424.27 | 617.66 | 54.60 | 468.34 | 1883.57 | 482.16 | 2834.06 |
| Missouri | Kansas City | 511,535 | 6240.63 | 27.56 | 74.68 | 253.94 | 1190.93 | 1547.11 | 17.40 | 490.29 | 2454.38 | 1731.46 | 4676.12 |
| Missouri | Springfield | 170,527 | 5379.79 | 5.86 | 104.38 | 123.73 | 944.13 | 1178.11 | 17.01 | 726.57 | 3001.28 | 456.82 | 4184.67 |
| Missouri | St. Louis | 277,294 | 7107.62 | 54.09 | 58.06 | 249.55 | 1005.43 | 1367.14 | 33.54 | 819.71 | 3412.26 | 1474.97 | 5706.94 |
| Nebraska | Lincoln | 295,808 | 2817.37 | 2.70 | 63.55 | 40.57 | 241.03 | 347.86 | 23.66 | 262.33 | 1863.71 | 319.80 | 2445.84 |
| Nebraska | Omaha | 480,235 | 3549.10 | 3.96 | 46.23 | 46.85 | 271.95 | 368.99 | 18.32 | 235.93 | 2264.31 | 661.55 | 3161.79 |
| Nevada | Henderson | 343,619 | 1996.98 | 2.33 | 31.14 | 52.38 | 186.54 | 272.39 | 9.60 | 226.41 | 1126.25 | 362.32 | 1714.98 |
| Nevada | Las Vegas | 1,716,565 | 3063.97 | 6.18 | 51.61 | 64.84 | 307.18 | 429.81 | 11.42 | 461.50 | 1564.52 | 596.71 | 2622.74 |
| Nevada | North Las Vegas | 293,100 | 2363.02 | 11.94 | 33.09 | 112.25 | 231.66 | 388.95 | 12.62 | 327.19 | 933.81 | 700.44 | 1961.45 |
| Nevada | Reno | 278,313 | 2979.38 | 8.26 | 68.99 | 94.50 | 357.87 | 529.62 | 4.67 | 312.24 | 1784.68 | 348.17 | 2445.09 |
| New Jersey | Elizabeth | 138,500 | 3069.31 | 3.61 | 31.77 | 112.64 | 260.65 | 408.66 | 2.89 | 148.01 | 1908.30 | 601.44 | 2657.76 |
| New Jersey | Jersey City | 297,922 | 2592.62 | 2.35 | 29.54 | 172.86 | 356.80 | 561.56 | 2.01 | 205.76 | 1526.24 | 297.06 | 2029.05 |
| New Jersey | Lakewood Township | 144,876 | 739.94 | 1.38 | 15.19 | 18.64 | 115.27 | 150.47 | 4.83 | 87.66 | 464.54 | 32.44 | 584.64 |
| New Jersey | Newark | 309,708 | 2542.39 | 12.59 | 40.68 | 142.72 | 385.20 | 581.19 | 3.87 | 152.40 | 931.20 | 873.73 | 1957.33 |
| New Jersey | Paterson | 158,903 | 3338.51 | 6.29 | 37.13 | 247.32 | 687.84 | 978.58 | 8.81 | 359.97 | 1480.78 | 510.37 | 2351.12 |
| New Mexico | Albuquerque | 558,745 | 5819.83 | 18.43 | 62.46 | 159.29 | 941.57 | 1181.76 | 9.31 | 772.45 | 2839.22 | 1017.10 | 4628.77 |
| New York | Buffalo | 273,728 | 4549.04 | 12.42 | 43.47 | 157.82 | 492.46 | 706.18 | 33.24 | 438.03 | 2573.36 | 798.24 | 3809.62 |
| New York | New York | 8,299,271 | 3049.24 | 3.92 | 23.41 | 187.47 | 456.22 | 671.02 | 9.95 | 154.74 | 2015.00 | 198.54 | 2368.27 |
| New York | Rochester | 206,093 | 3923.96 | 13.10 | 18.44 | 153.33 | 397.39 | 582.26 | 52.40 | 404.67 | 1795.79 | 1088.83 | 3289.29 |
| New York | Syracuse | 145,175 | 5014.64 | 15.15 | 58.55 | 133.63 | 557.95 | 765.28 | 15.15 | 721.20 | 2638.20 | 874.81 | 4234.20 |
| New York | Yonkers | 206,557 | 1338.13 | 1.94 | 9.20 | 63.42 | 237.22 | 311.78 | 11.62 | 118.13 | 742.17 | 154.44 | 1014.73 |
| North Carolina | Cary | 181,793 | 1392.79 | 1.65 | 6.60 | 12.65 | 50.06 | 70.96 | 4.40 | 88.56 | 1110.60 | 118.27 | 1317.43 |
| North Carolina | Charlotte-Mecklenburg | 1,003,130 | 4454.86 | 10.87 | 24.92 | 130.39 | 567.03 | 733.2 | 16.35 | 427.06 | 2518.22 | 760.02 | 3705.30 |
| North Carolina | Durham | 300,208 | 4430.59 | 12.32 | 57.29 | 160.89 | 388.73 | 619.24 | 11.66 | 450.35 | 2725.44 | 623.90 | 3799.70 |
| North Carolina | Fayetteville | 209,945 | 3781.47 | 12.38 | 32.87 | 100.98 | 513.94 | 660.17 | 26.67 | 387.24 | 2349.19 | 358.19 | 3094.62 |
| North Carolina | Greensboro | 304,306 | 4336.42 | 14.13 | 26.29 | 173.51 | 709.81 | 923.74 | 29.58 | 482.41 | 2308.20 | 592.50 | 3383.11 |
| North Carolina | Raleigh | 488,085 | 3315.41 | 5.12 | 36.06 | 86.67 | 361.00 | 488.85 | 7.38 | 279.05 | 2058.86 | 481.27 | 2819.18 |
| North Carolina | Winston-Salem | 254,041 | 3758.45 | 11.42 | 46.06 | 97.23 | 655.01 | 809.71 | 27.55 | 569.99 | 1996.92 | 354.27 | 2921.18 |
| North Dakota | Fargo | 135,682 | 4206.16 | 4.42 | 102.45 | 77.39 | 313.97 | 498.22 | 11.06 | 741.44 | 2600.93 | 354.51 | 3696.88 |
| Ohio | Akron | 188,223 | 3797.09 | 12.75 | 113.16 | 82.35 | 612.04 | 820.30 | 21.78 | 379.34 | 2162.86 | 412.81 | 2955.01 |
| Ohio | Cincinnati | 311,599 | 4674.92 | 21.82 | 57.12 | 231.71 | 534.98 | 845.64 | 0.00 | 548.46 | 2395.07 | 885.75 | 3829.28 |
| Ohio | Cleveland | 362,762 | 6039.77 | 30.05 | 140.86 | 389.24 | 1000.93 | 1561.08 | 52.38 | 860.34 | 2419.49 | 1146.48 | 4426.32 |
| Ohio | Columbus | 915,447 | 3090.08 | 12.23 | 124.20 | 87.72 | 210.72 | 434.87 | 1.86 | 404.50 | 1706.05 | 542.79 | 2653.35 |
| Ohio | Dayton | 134,857 | 5707.53 | 29.66 | 116.42 | 252.86 | 940.26 | 1339.20 | 34.11 | 859.43 | 2144.49 | 1330.30 | 4334.22 |
| Ohio | Toledo | 263,668 | 3823.75 | 12.14 | 98.61 | 107.33 | 823.00 | 1041.08 | 50.44 | 483.18 | 1844.36 | 404.68 | 2732.22 |
| Oklahoma | Oklahoma City | 709,456 | 3586.41 | 10.29 | 72.87 | 99.65 | 493.19 | 676.01 | 16.91 | 582.56 | 1950.79 | 360.14 | 2893.48 |
| Oklahoma | Tulsa | 411,310 | 4582.43 | 9.48 | 105.76 | 98.71 | 727.92 | 941.87 | 13.13 | 747.13 | 2397.70 | 482.60 | 3627.43 |
| Oregon | Eugene | 178,057 | 3642.09 | 1.12 | 46.05 | 70.76 | 199.94 | 317.88 | 68.52 | 475.69 | 2458.20 | 321.81 | 3255.70 |
| Oregon | Portland | 623,066 | 6288.10 | 10.75 | 50.88 | 177.35 | 481.17 | 720.15 | 41.73 | 727.37 | 3921.25 | 877.60 | 5526.22 |
| Oregon | Salem | 177,936 | 3397.29 | 4.50 | 37.09 | 88.80 | 401.83 | 532.21 | 61.82 | 442.29 | 1965.88 | 395.09 | 2803.26 |
| Pennsylvania | Philadelphia | 1,549,259 | 5503.53 | 16.91 | 46.09 | 273.23 | 572.47 | 908.69 | 46.67 | 318.99 | 3223.61 | 1005.58 | 4548.17 |
| Pennsylvania | Pittsburgh | 317,177 | 2730.02 | 11.35 | 51.71 | 124.22 | 239.93 | 427.21 | 22.70 | 232.68 | 1704.41 | 343.03 | 2280.11 |
| Rhode Island | Providence | 193,679 | 1935.16 | 6.20 | 20.65 | 55.76 | 194.14 | 276.75 | 0.52 | 117.20 | 1330.04 | 210.66 | 1657.90 |
| South Carolina | Charleston | 156,898 | 2389.45 | 4.46 | 28.04 | 42.70 | 282.35 | 357.56 | 10.20 | 139.58 | 1656.49 | 225.62 | 2021.70 |
| South Carolina | Columbia | 144,559 | 4021.89 | 9.68 | 61.57 | 108.61 | 590.07 | 769.93 | 19.37 | 496.68 | 2356.82 | 379.08 | 3232.59 |
| South Dakota | Sioux Falls | 210,926 | 3453.82 | 6.64 | 27.97 | 47.41 | 444.71 | 526.73 | 11.85 | 302.95 | 2174.70 | 437.59 | 2915.24 |
| Tennessee | Chattanooga | 188,894 | 4778.87 | 12.71 | 91.06 | 93.70 | 626.28 | 823.74 | 12.71 | 379.58 | 2896.33 | 666.51 | 3942.42 |
| Tennessee | Clarksville | 185,349 | 2051.80 | 4.86 | 54.49 | 23.20 | 327.49 | 410.04 | 9.71 | 201.24 | 1248.46 | 182.36 | 1632.06 |
| Tennessee | Knoxville | 200,457 | 3466.08 | 10.97 | 64.85 | 81.81 | 582.67 | 740.31 | 4.49 | 328.75 | 2013.90 | 378.63 | 2721.28 |
| Tennessee | Memphis | 613,207 | 9456.19 | 40.61 | 69.96 | 348.66 | 2042.05 | 2501.28 | 55.94 | 915.84 | 4399.49 | 1583.64 | 6898.98 |
| Tennessee | Nashville | 698,987 | 5641.31 | 14.59 | 71.96 | 154.94 | 882.56 | 1124.06 | 7.73 | 442.50 | 3344.41 | 722.62 | 4509.53 |
| Tennessee | Murfreesboro | 169,520 | 2443.96 | 2.95 | 51.91 | 29.50 | 335.65 | 420.01 | 1.77 | 163.40 | 1658.80 | 199.98 | 2022.18 |
| Texas | Amarillo | 203,039 | 3374.72 | 8.37 | 73.88 | 86.68 | 521.57 | 690.51 | 28.57 | 377.76 | 2017.35 | 260.54 | 2655.65 |
| Texas | Arlington | 399,840 | 2898.16 | 4.25 | 71.28 | 60.02 | 347.39 | 482.94 | 2.50 | 263.86 | 1737.70 | 411.16 | 2412.72 |
| Texas | Austin | 984,613 | 3724.10 | 6.60 | 67.64 | 85.41 | 307.23 | 466.88 | 15.34 | 445.15 | 2198.12 | 598.61 | 3241.88 |
| Texas | Brownsville | 191,221 | 2404.02 | 2.09 | 30.85 | 60.66 | 362.41 | 456.02 | 6.28 | 192.45 | 1335.63 | 413.66 | 1941.73 |
| Texas | Carrollton | 133,471 | 1457.25 | 0.75 | 12.74 | 22.48 | 101.15 | 137.11 | 4.50 | 152.09 | 961.26 | 202.29 | 1315.64 |
| Texas | Corpus Christi | 316,108 | 3895.19 | 8.54 | 74.34 | 115.78 | 664.96 | 863.63 | 20.25 | 522.29 | 2098.65 | 390.37 | 3011.31 |
| Texas | Dallas | 1,321,502 | 4021.33 | 13.62 | 35.94 | 168.52 | 440.11 | 658.19 | 11.28 | 464.09 | 1787.28 | 1100.49 | 3351.87 |
| Texas | Denton | 164,565 | 1954.24 | 4.25 | 57.73 | 26.13 | 116.06 | 204.17 | 5.47 | 133.08 | 1470.54 | 140.98 | 1744.60 |
| Texas | El Paso | 678,860 | 1782.55 | 2.95 | 0.59 | 37.12 | 237.75 | 278.41 | 10.16 | 140.24 | 1072.39 | 281.35 | 1493.98 |
| Texas | Fort Worth | 997,476 | 3171.20 | 7.42 | 55.24 | 72.58 | 323.12 | 458.36 | 13.03 | 344.57 | 1841.85 | 513.40 | 2699.81 |
| Texas | Frisco | 232,961 | 1106.62 | 1.29 | 23.61 | 12.45 | 63.53 | 100.88 | 3.00 | 68.25 | 866.67 | 67.82 | 1002.74 |
| Texas | Garland | 246,255 | 2225.34 | 4.87 | 26.40 | 60.51 | 140.91 | 232.69 | 4.47 | 303.34 | 1283.63 | 401.21 | 1988.18 |
| Texas | Grand Prairie | 206,122 | 1825.62 | 1.94 | 19.89 | 28.14 | 171.26 | 221.23 | 3.40 | 156.70 | 1147.86 | 296.43 | 1600.99 |
| Texas | Houston | 2,319,160 | 5451.46 | 13.80 | 73.00 | 274.02 | 787.35 | 1148.17 | 9.83 | 644.76 | 2945.68 | 703.01 | 4293.45 |
| Texas | Irving | 257,460 | 2477.67 | 7.38 | 53.60 | 57.10 | 157.31 | 275.38 | 3.50 | 250.14 | 1521.79 | 426.86 | 2198.79 |
| Texas | Killeen | 161,667 | 1913.19 | 12.37 | 68.66 | 54.43 | 392.16 | 527.63 | 3.09 | 313.61 | 784.33 | 284.54 | 1382.47 |
| Texas | Laredo | 258,311 | 1848.93 | 2.32 | 47.62 | 48.78 | 267.12 | 365.84 | 18.20 | 199.37 | 1100.61 | 164.92 | 1464.90 |
| Texas | Lewisville | 136,046 | 1708.25 | 2.94 | 41.16 | 16.91 | 126.43 | 187.44 | 3.68 | 131.57 | 1109.18 | 276.38 | 1517.13 |
| Texas | Lubbock | 269,900 | 3473.14 | 5.19 | 77.07 | 115.60 | 623.19 | 821.04 | 23.34 | 537.98 | 1822.90 | 267.88 | 2628.75 |
| Texas | McAllen | 148,017 | 1991.66 | 2.70 | 39.18 | 23.65 | 84.45 | 149.98 | 6.08 | 63.51 | 1704.53 | 67.56 | 1835.60 |
| Texas | McKinney | 219,132 | 936.42 | 2.74 | 26.92 | 12.78 | 74.84 | 117.28 | 3.65 | 85.34 | 656.68 | 73.47 | 815.49 |
| Texas | Mesquite | 148,803 | 3483.13 | 4.03 | 40.32 | 80.64 | 376.34 | 501.33 | 5.38 | 391.79 | 1965.01 | 619.61 | 2976.42 |
| Texas | Midland | 140,303 | 1979.29 | 4.99 | 67.00 | 23.52 | 269.42 | 364.92 | 2.14 | 228.79 | 1172.46 | 210.97 | 1612.22 |
| Texas | Pasadena | 145,199 | 2927.02 | 4.13 | 69.56 | 73.69 | 418.74 | 566.12 | 8.95 | 252.07 | 1677.70 | 422.18 | 2351.94 |
| Texas | Plano | 291,463 | 1621.13 | 1.03 | 33.28 | 26.76 | 90.58 | 151.65 | 3.09 | 160.57 | 1163.44 | 142.39 | 1466.40 |
| Texas | Round Rock | 133,868 | 2073.68 | 1.49 | 29.13 | 17.18 | 82.92 | 130.73 | 2.24 | 170.32 | 1629.22 | 141.18 | 1940.72 |
| Texas | San Antonio | 1,514,458 | 5229.46 | 8.39 | 83.66 | 108.36 | 393.74 | 594.14 | 11.69 | 495.56 | 3291.80 | 836.27 | 4623.63 |
| Texas | Waco | 146,270 | 2557.60 | 5.47 | 90.93 | 57.43 | 272.10 | 425.92 | 5.47 | 294.66 | 1626.44 | 205.10 | 2126.20 |
| Utah | Salt Lake City | 212,675 | 6085.81 | 5.17 | 158.46 | 183.38 | 517.22 | 864.23 | 21.63 | 551.08 | 4184.79 | 464.09 | 5199.95 |
| Virginia | Alexandria | 155,153 | 2861.69 | 1.29 | 7.73 | 72.83 | 137.28 | 219.14 | 2.58 | 96.03 | 2301.60 | 242.34 | 2639.97 |
| Virginia | Chesapeake | 257,248 | 2087.48 | 4.66 | 23.32 | 44.70 | 266.67 | 339.36 | 3.89 | 185.04 | 1446.46 | 112.73 | 1744.23 |
| Virginia | Hampton | 138,100 | 3139.75 | 10.86 | 28.96 | 56.48 | 151.34 | 247.65 | 10.14 | 209.99 | 2433.02 | 238.96 | 2881.97 |
| Virginia | Newport News | 183,563 | 3173.30 | 11.98 | 28.87 | 84.98 | 610.14 | 735.99 | 21.25 | 221.72 | 1908.88 | 285.46 | 2416.06 |
| Virginia | Norfolk | 230,460 | 4245.86 | 16.05 | 40.35 | 77.24 | 335.85 | 469.50 | 3.91 | 254.27 | 3122.88 | 395.30 | 3772.46 |
| Virginia | Richmond | 231,805 | 3530.99 | 24.16 | 18.55 | 94.48 | 199.74 | 336.92 | 14.67 | 265.31 | 2386.92 | 527.17 | 3179.40 |
| Virginia | Virginia Beach | 455,155 | 1741.38 | 2.86 | 18.46 | 31.64 | 39.33 | 92.28 | 9.23 | 83.93 | 1446.76 | 109.19 | 1639.88 |
| Washington | Bellevue | 151,520 | 3486.67 | 0.66 | 9.90 | 50.82 | 77.22 | 138.60 | 8.58 | 362.33 | 2636.62 | 340.55 | 3339.49 |
| Washington | Seattle | 760,058 | 5802.85 | 6.84 | 46.31 | 220.64 | 501.28 | 775.07 | 20.13 | 1152.02 | 2882.02 | 973.61 | 5007.64 |
| Washington | Spokane | 229,529 | 5570.97 | 6.97 | 76.68 | 145.08 | 446.13 | 674.86 | 55.33 | 646.54 | 3668.82 | 525.42 | 4840.78 |
| Washington | Tacoma | 223,980 | 6715.33 | 9.82 | 67.86 | 184.39 | 800.96 | 1063.04 | 48.67 | 669.70 | 3521.30 | 1412.63 | 5603.63 |
| Washington | Vancouver | 198,194 | 4006.18 | 5.55 | 61.56 | 122.10 | 393.05 | 582.26 | 16.65 | 469.24 | 2341.14 | 596.89 | 3407.27 |
| Wisconsin | Madison | 282,045 | 2123.77 | 2.48 | 26.59 | 33.68 | 193.23 | 255.99 | 2.84 | 158.49 | 1595.49 | 110.98 | 1864.95 |
| Wisconsin | Milwaukee | 560,416 | 4164.23 | 23.91 | 68.16 | 308.16 | 1030.66 | 1430.90 | 32.65 | 388.10 | 1255.14 | 1057.43 | 2700.67 |

Notes:

^{1} The FBI does not publish arson data unless it receives data from either the agency or the state for all 12 months of the calendar year.
^{2} Because of changes in this agency's reporting practices, figures are not comparable to previous years' data.
^{3} Limited data for 2024 were available for Florida.

== Crime rates for selected cities ==
| State | City | Year | Popul. | Yearly Crime Rates per 100,000 people | | | | | | | | | | |
| State | City | Year | Popul. | Total | Violent crime | | | | | Arson^{2} | Property crime | | | |
| State | City | Year | Popul. | Total | Murder and Nonnegligent manslaughter | Rape^{1} | Robbery | Aggravated assault | Total | Arson^{2} | Burglary | Larceny theft | Motor vehicle theft | Total |
|---|---|---|---|---|---|---|---|---|---|---|---|---|---|---|
| Florida | Ft Lauderdale | 2019 | 909,142 | 3,965.94 | 14.19 | 60.94 | 142.33 | 429.97 | 647.42 | 9.02 | 539.63 | 2,460.89 | 308.97 | 3,309.49 |
| Alabama | Birmingham | 2019 | 292,120 | 5,570.31 | 8.56 | 69.83 | 183.49 | 476.52 | 738.40 | 5.13 | 501.16 | 3,889.50 | 436.12 | 4,826.78 |
| Texas | Houston | 2023 | 500,212 | 4,613.64 | 26.38 | 12.39 | 120.55 | 542.97 | 702.29 | 9.20 | 338.26 | 2,521.73 | 1,042.16 | 3,902.15 |
| Tennessee | Memphis^{3} | 2019 | 394,498 | 6,437.29 | 30.67 | 196.20 | 256.78 | 661.09 | 1,144.75 | | 543.22 | 4,001.29 | 748.04 | 5,292.55 |

Notes:

^{1} The figures shown in this column for the offense of rape were reported using only the revised Uniform Crime Reporting (UCR) definition of rape. See the data declaration for further explanation.
^{2} The FBI does not publish arson data unless it receives data from either the agency or the state for all 12 months of the calendar year.
^{3} The FBI determined that the agency's data were underreported. Consequently, those data are not included in this table.

== Criticism of ranking crime data ==
The FBI website recommends against using its data for ranking because these rankings lead to simplistic and/or incomplete analyses that often create misleading perceptions adversely affecting cities and counties, along with their residents. The FBI website also recommends against using its data to judge how effective law enforcement agencies are, since there are many factors other than law enforcement that influence crime rates.

In November 2007, the executive board of the American Society of Criminology (ASC) went further than the FBI itself, and approved a resolution opposing not only the use of the ratings to judge police departments, but also any development of city crime rankings from FBI Uniform Crime Reports (UCRs) at all. The resolution opposed these rankings on the grounds that they "fail to account for the many conditions affecting crime rates" and "divert attention from the individual and community characteristics that elevate crime in all cities", though it did not provide sources or further elaborate on these claims. The resolution states the rankings "represent an irresponsible misuse of the data and do groundless harm to many communities" and "work against a key goal of our society, which is a better understanding of crime-related issues by both scientists and the public".

The U.S. Conference of Mayors passed a similar statement, which also committed the Conference to working with the FBI and the U.S. Department of Justice "to educate reporters, elected officials, and citizens on what the (UCR) data means and doesn't mean."

== See also ==
- Crime in the United States
  - List of cities by murder rate
  - List of U.S. states by homicide rate
  - United States cities by crime rate (100,000–250,000)
  - United States cities by crime rate (60,000-100,000)
- Demographics of the United States
- Homicide in world cities
- List of Canada cities by crime severity index
