= List of Canada cities by crime severity index =

The following table of Canadian cities by weighted crime rate is based on the crime severity index provided by Statistics Canada, for each year, for cities with populations over 100,000 as per the 2021 Canadian census.

Winnipeg ranked as the most dangerous large city in Canada for 2024, highlighting the issues that the Canadian Prairies struggle in regards to crime.

== 2024 ==
Cities by Crime Severity Index in 2024
	Province	City	CSI Score	Violent CSI	Population (2021 census)
1	Manitoba	Winnipeg	130.93	199.11	749,607
2	British Columbia	Kelowna	123.51	117.54	144,576
3	British Columbia	Richmond	119.12	54.12	209,937
4	Alberta	Red Deer	118.65	128.92	100,844
5	Saskatchewan	Saskatoon	117.49	159.83	266,141
6	Ontario	Thunder Bay	113.79	218.70	108,843
7	Alberta	Edmonton	109.27	121.98	1,010,899
8	Saskatchewan	Regina	104.74	136.89	226,404
9	British Columbia	Vancouver	92.93	96.40	622,248
10	British Columbia	Abbotsford	92.03	98.10	153,524
	British Columbia	Surrey	86.49	79.35	568,322
	Ontario	Brantford	80.77	92.42	104.688
	Ontario	Windsor	80.32	96.33	229,660
	British Columbia	Langley Township	78.45	80.05	132,603
	Newfoundland and Labrador	St. John's	76.95	94.16	110,525
	Quebec	Montreal	75.72	112.51	1,762,949
	Nova Scotia	Halifax Regional Municipality	74.19	94.45	439,819
	Ontario	Chatham-Kent	74.00	77.37	103,933
	Ontario	Waterloo Region	72.68	91.40	587,165
	Ontario	Toronto	68.65	99.82	2,794,356
	Ontario	Kingston	67.77	72.12	132,485
	British Columbia	Burnaby	67.49	60.82	249,125
	Ontario	Greater Sudbury	67.07	108.49	166,004
	Ontario	Hamilton	66.15	85.89	569,353
	Ontario	London	65.89	81.84	422,324
	Alberta	Calgary	63.27	78.53	1,306,784
	Ontario	Barrie	60.27	70.49	147,829
	Ontario	St. Catharines	58.97	78.46	136,803
	Ontario	Peel Region (Brampton + Mississauga)	56.36	80.17	1,374,441
	Ontario	Guelph	56.00	77.56	143,740
	Ontario	Ottawa	55.75	67.44	1,017,449
	British Columbia	Delta	55.30	60.68	108,455
	British Columbia	Coquitlam	55.23	58.13	148,625
	Ontario	York Region	53.91	70.85	1,173,334
	Ontario	Durham Region	47.11	64.38	696,922
	British Columbia	Saanich	37.19	46.43	117,735
	Quebec	Lévis	36.09	60.70	149,683

== 2023 ==
Cities by Crime Severity Index in 2023
	Province	City	CSI Score	Violent CSI	Population (2021 census)
1	Alberta	Red Deer	147.81	151.99	100,844
2	British Columbia	Kelowna	138.54	128.65	144,576
3	Manitoba	Winnipeg	136.68	209.74	749,607
4	Saskatchewan	Saskatoon	131.07	157.14	266,141
5	Saskatchewan	Regina	118.12	151.71	226,404
6	Alberta	Edmonton	115.03	136.12	1,010,899
7	Ontario	Thunder Bay	105.14	204.69	108,843
8	British Columbia	Surrey	103.58	78.74	568,322
9	British Columbia	Richmond	100.84	62.50	209,937
10	British Columbia	Abbotsford	98.75	92.29	153,524
	British Columbia	Vancouver	96.78	102.01	622,248
	British Columbia	Langley Township	96.15	75.11	132,603
	Ontario	Windsor	84.58	93.42	229,660
	Ontario	Kingston	83.77	74.66	132,485
	Newfoundland and Labrador	St. John's	82.36	104.03	110,525
	Quebec	Montreal	80.84	115.02	1,762,949
	Ontario	Brantford	78.94	93.81	104.688
	Ontario	Greater Sudbury	76.87	128.78	166,004
	Ontario	Chatham-Kent	76.17	72.73	103,933
	Ontario	Waterloo Region	75.99	93.03	587,165
	Alberta	Calgary	74.35	86.80	1,306,784
	British Columbia	Burnaby	73.95	63.98	249,125
	Nova Scotia	Halifax Regional Municipality	71.55	97.91	439,819
	Ontario	London	70.78	88.75	422,324
	Ontario	Toronto	69.57	96.92	2,794,356
	Ontario	Hamilton	68.16	87.77	569,353
	British Columbia	Coquitlam	65.49	69.06	148,625
	British Columbia	Delta	64.11	70.61	108,455
	Ontario	Barrie	63.03	77.47	147,829
	Ontario	Ottawa	55.82	66.87	1,017,449
	Ontario	Guelph	55.78	65.69	143,740
	Ontario	St. Catharines	55.39	68.83	136,803
	Ontario	York Region	54.54	68.27	1,173,334
	Ontario	Peel Region (Brampton + Mississauga)	52.19	68.44	1,374,441
	Ontario	Durham Region	47.01	60.41	696,922
	British Columbia	Saanich	44.44	47.65	117,735
	Quebec	Lévis	31.60	41.95	149,683

== See also ==
- List of United States cities by crime rate
