= List of mass shootings in the United States (2010–2019) =

Most notable mass shootings in the contiguous United States in the 2010s
Most notable mass shootings in Puerto Rico in the 2010s

This is a list of the most notable mass shootings in the United States that have occurred between 2010–2019. Mass shootings are incidents involving several victims of firearm-related violence. The precise inclusion criteria are disputed, and there is no broadly accepted definition. Only shootings that have Wikipedia articles of their own are included in this list. Detailed lists of shootings can be found per-year at their respective pages.

The Gun Violence Archive, a nonprofit research group that tracks shootings and their characteristics in the United States, defines a mass shooting as an incident in which four or more people, excluding the perpetrator(s), are shot in one location at roughly the same time, with the FBI having a minimum of three. The Congressional Research Service narrows that definition further, only considering what it defines as "public mass shootings", and only considering victims as those who are killed, excluding any victims who survive. The Washington Post and Mother Jones use similar definitions, with the latter acknowledging that their definition "is a conservative measure of the problem", as many rampages with fewer fatalities occur. The crowdsourced Mass Shooting Tracker project uses a looser definition than the Gun Violence Archive's definition: four people shot in one incident regardless of the circumstances.

Larger documentation of mass shootings in the United States has occurred through independent and scholarly studies such as the Stanford University Mass Shootings in America Data Project.

== Definitions ==
There are varying definitions of a mass shooting. Listed roughly from broadest to most restrictive:

- Stanford MSA Data Project: three or more persons shot in one incident, excluding the perpetrator(s), at one location, at roughly the same time. Excluded are shootings associated with organized crime, gangs or drug wars.
- Mass Shooting Tracker: 4+ shot in one incident, at one location, at roughly the same time.
- Gun Violence Archive/Vox: 4+ shot in one incident, excluding the perpetrator(s), at one location, at roughly the same time.
- Mother Jones: 3+ shot and killed in one incident, excluding the perpetrator(s), at a public place, excluding gang-related killings.
- The Washington Post: 4+ shot and killed in one incident, excluding the perpetrator(s), at a public place, excluding gang-related killings.
- Congressional Research Service: 4+ shot and killed in one incident, excluding the perpetrator(s), at a public place, excluding gang-related killings, acts carried out that were inspired by criminal profit, and terrorism.

== List of mass shootings (2010–2019) ==
=== 2019 ===
Date	Location	Dead	Injured	Total	Description
December 10, 2019	Jersey City, New Jersey	6 (Note: Including both perpetrators)	3	9	2019 Jersey City shooting: An officer approached a vehicle suspected of being used in a murder previously, he was shot and killed. In the resulting suspect chase and police confrontation the two suspects were killed, along with three other civilians, a civilian and two cops were wounded as well. The attack in question was committed by a Black Hebrew Israelite and targeted Jews living in Jersey City.
December 6, 2019	Pensacola, Florida	4 (Note: Including the perpetrator or suspect)	8	12	2019 Naval Air Station Pensacola shooting: Three people were killed and 8 others were injured at a US Navy base. The suspect was killed by police.
November 17, 2019	Fresno, California	4	6	10	2019 Fresno shooting: Ten people were shot, four fatally, at a football watch party.
November 14, 2019	Santa Clarita, California	3	3	6	2019 Saugus High School shooting: Two people were killed and three others were injured. The gunman then eventually committed suicide.
October 31, 2019	Orinda, California	5	5	9	Orinda shooting: An overnight block party attended by over 100 people ended with five people killed, and five more wounded by gunfire.
October 14, 2019	San Juan, Puerto Rico	6	0	6	2019 Río Piedras shooting: Six people were killed after a shootout near an apartment complex.
August 31, 2019	Midland/Odessa, Texas	8	24	32	2019 Midland–Odessa shootings: A man fired at motorists and pedestrians from his car as he drove along multiple roads, killing seven people and wounding 24 others. He was killed by police during a shootout.
August 4, 2019	Dayton, Ohio	10	17	27	2019 Dayton shooting: A gunman shot 26 people, killing nine, including his sibling, and wounding 17 others outside of a bar. Ten others were wounded as they fled the scene. The perpetrator was killed by police just 32 seconds after the first shots were fired.
August 3, 2019	El Paso, Texas	23 (Note: Including one victim who died in April 2020)	22	45	2019 El Paso Walmart shooting: A gunman shot 45 people, killing 23 and wounding 22 others at a Walmart Supercenter near the Cielo Vista Mall. The attack was a hate crime targeting Hispanic immigration and was influenced by the Christchurch mosque shootings. The perpetrator was arrested by police.
July 28, 2019	Gilroy, California	4	11	15	2019 Gilroy Garlic Festival shooting: A gunman killed three people, including a 6-year-old boy, attending Gilroy's annual Garlic Festival; 11 more people were injured. The shooter killed himself.
May 31, 2019	Virginia Beach, Virginia	13	4	17	2019 Virginia Beach shooting: A gunman killed 12 people and injured four others at a municipal building. The gunman was killed by police.
May 7, 2019	Highlands Ranch, Colorado	1	8	9	2019 STEM School Highlands Ranch shooting: A school shooting was reported at STEM School Highlands Ranch, around 1:50 p.m, two shooters targeted separate locations and killed one student and injured eight more before being arrested.
April 30, 2019	Charlotte, North Carolina	2	4	6	2019 University of North Carolina at Charlotte shooting: Six people were shot, two fatally, on the last day of classes at the University of North Carolina at Charlotte. The student gunman was taken into custody after he ran out of ammunition.
April 27, 2019	Poway, California	1	3	4	2019 Poway synagogue shooting: One person was killed and at least three were wounded by a shooter at the Chabad of Poway synagogue. The gunman was influenced by the Christchurch mosque shootings in New Zealand and claimed responsibility for the Escondido mosque fire the month prior.
February 15, 2019	Aurora, Illinois	6	6	12	2019 Aurora, Illinois, shooting: A 45-year-old man opened fire at a Henry Pratt Company plant and killed five people and injured six others. He was a former worker at the plant and he was killed in a shootout with police.
January 28, 2019	Houston, Texas	2	4	6	Harding Street raid: Two homeowners were killed and four Houston Police Department officers wounded by gunfire in a shootout during a no-knock raid.
January 26, 2019	Ascension and Livingston Parish, Louisiana	5	0	5	2019 Ascension-Livingston shootings: A 21-year-old man killed five people, including his parents, in two parishes in Louisiana.
January 23, 2019	Sebring, Florida	5	0	5	2019 Sebring shooting: Five people were killed in a hostage incident and shooting at a bank. The suspect was taken into custody by police.

=== 2018 ===
Date	Location	Dead	Injured	Total	Description
November 11, 2018	Robbins, Illinois	1	4	5	Killing of Jemel Roberson: A man re-entered a bar after being ejected and began to fire, wounding three people and becoming injured himself. Armed security guards apprehended the suspect. Responding officers saw one of the security guards with a gun, and shot and killed him.
November 7, 2018	Thousand Oaks, California	13	1	14	Thousand Oaks shooting: A man entered a bar hosting a student line-dancing event and killed 12 people, including a police officer. 16 other people were injured, one of them by gunfire. The gunman then killed himself.
November 2, 2018	Tallahassee, Florida	3	4	8	2018 Tallahassee shooting: A man entered a yoga studio and killed two women and injured five others; four by gunshots and one by pistol-whipping, before committing suicide.
October 27, 2018	Pittsburgh, Pennsylvania	11	7	18	Pittsburgh synagogue shooting: A man opened fire in the Tree of Life synagogue in an antisemitic attack, killing 11 people and injuring six others (including four police officers). The suspect, 46-year-old Robert G. Bowers, was taken into custody by police.
October 3, 2018	Florence County, South Carolina	2	10	12	2018 Florence, South Carolina, shooting: A man ambushed police officers attempting to serve an arrest warrant on his son, killing two and injuring five other officers. Five civilians were also wounded during the subsequent shootout.
September 20, 2018	Aberdeen, Maryland	4	3	7	2018 Aberdeen, Maryland, shooting: An employee of the Rite Aid Distribution facility killed three victims before wounding herself. The shooter died later in the hospital.
September 6, 2018	Cincinnati, Ohio	4	2	6	2018 Cincinnati shooting: A gunman entered a loading dock at the Fifth Third Center skyscraper and opened fire before entering the lobby of a building. Four people, including the shooter, were killed and two were injured.
August 26, 2018	Jacksonville, Florida	3	10	13	2018 Jacksonville Landing shooting: A gunman killed two people and wounded eleven more (ten with gunshot wounds) at a Madden NFL 19 competition before killing himself. The shooter was identified as David Katz, an individual who had reportedly been eliminated from the competition before the shooting.
June 28, 2018	Annapolis, Maryland	5	2	7	Capital Gazette shooting: A gunman entered the offices of The Capital Gazette and killed five employees and wounded two others.
June 17, 2018	Trenton, New Jersey	1	17	18	Art All Night shooting: Several gunmen wounded 17 people at the Art All Night festival. Five others were wounded when they were trampled by people around them. One of the suspected gunmen was shot and killed by police. Police suspect the shooting was gang-related.
May 30–June 4, 2018	Scottsdale, Arizona	7	0	7	2018 Scottsdale shootings: Over the course of several days, a man killed a forensic psychiatrist, two paralegals, a counselor, and a couple from whom he took a handgun. The suspect killed himself when police began closing in on him.
May 18, 2018	Santa Fe, Texas	10	14	24	2018 Santa Fe High School shooting: A student at Santa Fe High School shot and killed 10 people and wounded 14 others. Explosive devices were also found, but they were not detonated. The suspect was taken into custody by police.
April 22, 2018	Nashville, Tennessee	4	2	6	Nashville Waffle House shooting: A gunman entered a Waffle House, where he killed four people and injured two others. He was later taken into custody.
March 9, 2018	Yountville, California	5 (Note: Including an unborn child)	0	5	Yountville shooting: A man entered the Veterans Home of California and held three staff members hostage. He killed the three staff members (and the unborn child of one of the staff members, who was pregnant) before killing himself in a murder–suicide.
February 14, 2018	Parkland, Florida	17	17	34	Parkland high school shooting: 19-year-old Nikolas Cruz, a former student of Marjory Stoneman Douglas High School, entered the school, killed 17 people, and wounded 17 others. He was taken into custody by police. On October 13, 2022, he was sentenced to life in prison without the possibility of parole.
January 23, 2018	Benton, Kentucky	2	14	16	2018 Marshall County High School shooting: A fifteen-year-old student killed two other students and injured fourteen others by gunfire before discarding his weapon and attempting to hide among other students. He was apprehended by police.

=== 2017 ===
Date	Location	Dead	Injured	Total	Description
December 31, 2017	Highlands Ranch, Colorado	2	7	9	2017 Copper Canyon Apartment Homes shooting: After being called to a home for a report of a disturbance, five police officers were shot in an "ambush-style" attack. One officer was killed and the other four were wounded. Two other people were also wounded in a neighboring apartment. Officers later re-entered the apartment with a SWAT team and killed the suspect; another officer was injured in this exchange.
November 13–14, 2017	Rancho Tehama, California	6	11	17	Rancho Tehama shootings: A man opened fire in multiple locations across the rural community of Rancho Tehama, killing 5 and injuring 11 before killing himself. Another seven were injured by other causes.
November 5, 2017	Sutherland Springs, Texas	27	22	49	Sutherland Springs church shooting: A gunman approached the First Baptist Church in Sutherland Springs and killed two people outside before entering and shooting at the congregation, killing 26 people (including an unborn child) and injuring 22. He was confronted by a local man with a gun, and they exchanged gunfire before entering a vehicle. The man flagged down another person and they began a high-speed chase of the gunman, which ended when the gunman went off the road and was found dead from a self-inflicted gunshot wound.
October 1, 2017	Paradise, Nevada	61	413+	474+	2017 Las Vegas shooting: A man on the 32nd floor of a hotel opened fire on a country music festival happening outside, killing 60 people and injuring 867 others, with at least 413 of them suffering from gunshot wounds. The man then killed himself.
September 24, 2017	Memphis, Tennessee	1	7	8	Burnette Chapel shooting: A man killed a woman outside the Burnette Chapel Church of Christ before entering the chapel and wounding seven others, six by gunfire. During a struggle with an usher, the man shot himself in the chest. The usher ran to his car to get his own pistol and held the man at gunpoint until police arrived to arrest him.
September 13, 2017	Rockford, Washington	1	3	4	2017 Freeman High School shooting: A boy's attempted to fire into a school hallway with his rifle, however after it malfunctioned he drew a handgun and opened fire, killing one and injuring three others.
September 10, 2017	Plano, Texas	9	1	10	2017 Plano shooting: A man entered his ex-wife's home while she was hosting a football-watching party and killed her and seven others, and wounded one other. He was killed by police.
August 28, 2017	Clovis, New Mexico	2	4	6	Clovis library shooting: A sixteen-year-old killed two people and wounded four others at a public library before surrendering to police.
July 1, 2017	Little Rock, Arkansas	0	25	25	Little Rock nightclub shooting: Multiple people opened fire on each other during a break from a concert, injuring at least 28 people, 25 by gunfire.
June 30, 2017	New York City, New York	2	6	8	Bronx-Lebanon Hospital attack: A former hospital employee killed a doctor and wounded six others before he committed suicide.
June 14, 2017	San Francisco, California	4	2	6	San Francisco UPS shooting: A gunman entered his workplace and singled out coworkers, killing three and wounding two by gunfire, before committing suicide.
June 14, 2017	Alexandria, Virginia	1	4	5	Congressional baseball shooting: A gunman shot and wounded four people, including Republican Congressman and House Majority Whip Steve Scalise, while they were practicing for the Congressional Baseball Game. Two others were also injured in other ways. The gunman was killed after being engaged by Capitol police officers assigned to protect Scalise and by police officers responding to the scene.
June 6, 2017	Sandy, Utah	3	2	5	2017 Sandy, Utah attack: A man rammed a vehicle containing his ex-girlfriend, three children and one other adult, opened fire, killing two and wounding two, then committed suicide.
June 5, 2017	Orlando, Florida	6	0	6	2017 Orlando factory shooting: A former employee entered the factory through a rear exit and killed five employees and then himself.
May 27, 2017	Lincoln County, Mississippi	8	1	9	2017 Lincoln County, Mississippi, shootings: A man killed eight people, including several family members and a sheriff's deputy, at three separate houses. He was injured by police and then arrested. The shooter later said he had intended to commit suicide by cop.
March 22, 2017	Rothschild, Schofield, & Weston, Wisconsin	5	0	5	2017 Marathon County shootings: A man opened fire at a bank in Rothschild after his wife refused to sign divorce papers, killing two bank employees. After killing the employees, he drove to the law office of his wife's attorney in Schofield and shot and killed his wife's attorney. Finally, the man returned to his apartment in Weston where he engaged in stand-off with police where he shot and killed a police officer before he was fatally shot by police.
January 6, 2017	Broward County, Florida	5	6	11	Fort Lauderdale airport shooting: A man killed five people and injured six in a shooting at Fort Lauderdale–Hollywood International Airport before running out of ammunition and lying on the ground to surrender to police. Thirty to forty other people were also hurt, with injuries not directly caused by gunfire.

=== 2016 ===
Date	Location	Dead	Injured	Total	Description
October 15, 2016	Los Angeles, California	4	10	14	Marlon Jones: A shooting between gang members at a birthday party led to four people, including a gang leader, being killed, and 10 others being injured. One of the suspects in the shooting was added to the FBI Ten Most Wanted Fugitives list before being arrested.
September 28, 2016	Townville, South Carolina	2	3	5	2016 Townville Elementary School shooting: A fourteen-year-old shot and killed his father before driving to the local elementary school and injuring three students and a teacher. One student later died of his injuries. The shooter was later arrested.
September 23, 2016	Burlington, Washington	5	0	5	2016 Cascade Mall shooting: A man killed five people at the Cascade Mall. He was arrested a day later. The shooter later killed himself while in jail.
August 20, 2016	Citronelle, Alabama	6	0	6	2016 Citronelle murders: A man killed six people (including an unborn child) while they were sleeping in a home. He was arrested by police.
July 30, 2016	Mukilteo, Washington	3	1	4	2016 Mukilteo shooting: A student at the University of Washington killed three people and injured one other in a shooting at a party. One of the people he killed was his ex-girlfriend. The shooter was arrested and sentenced to life in prison.
July 17, 2016	Baton Rouge, Louisiana	5	2	7	2016 shooting of Baton Rouge police officers: A gunman killed four law enforcement officers, one of whom died in 2022, and injured three others. The gunman was killed by a member of the SWAT team that responded to the shooting. The shooting is believed to have been related to the unrest in Baton Rouge following the shooting of Alton Sterling, and the gunman was involved with black separatist and sovereign citizen organizations.
July 11, 2016	St. Joseph, Michigan	3	2	5	St. Joseph courthouse shooting: A handcuffed inmate killed two bailiffs and injured a deputy and another woman after taking a deputy's gun in a courthouse. The inmate was killed by two other bailiffs.
July 7, 2016	Dallas, Texas	6	11	17	2016 shooting of Dallas police officers: A shooter killed five police officers and wounded nine other officers and two civilians at a protest over the police shootings of Alton Sterling and Philando Castile. The shooter was killed by a bomb delivered by a remote control vehicle. He is believed to have been motivated by retribution for black men killed by police.
June 12, 2016	Orlando, Florida	50	53	103	Pulse nightclub shooting: A gunman, Omar Mateen, killed 49 people and wounded 53 others in a shooting at Pulse, a gay nightclub. The gunman was killed in a shootout with the police.
May 5–6, 2016	Beltsville, Bethesda, and Aspen Hill, Maryland	3	3	6	Eulalio Tordil shootings: A man killed his ex-wife and injured a man who attempted to intervene outside of High Point High School before embarking on a shooting spree throughout the Washington metropolitan area. Three people were killed and three others were injured in total.
March 9, 2016	Wilkinsburg, Pennsylvania	6	3	9	2016 Wilkinsburg shooting: Six people (including an unborn child) were killed and three were injured by two gunmen in an attack during a backyard party. One person with a handgun drove the partygoers toward a backyard porch, where the second shot at them with an assault-style rifle.
March 7–8, 2016	Kansas City, Kansas, and Montgomery County, Missouri	5	0	5	2016 Kansas–Missouri murder spree: Four people were killed at a home and another was shot and killed the following day. The perpetrator was arrested the next day.
February 25, 2016	Hesston and Newton, Kansas	4	14	18	Hesston shootings: A man killed three people and injured fourteen others in an attack at his workplace. He had been served with a temporary order of protection shortly before he began shooting. He was killed by police who responded to the scene.
February 20, 2016	Kalamazoo, Michigan	6	2	8	2016 Kalamazoo shootings: An Uber driver killed six people and wounded two others in a series of shootings targeting random people.

=== 2015 ===
Date	Location	Dead	Injured	Total	Description
December 2, 2015	San Bernardino, California	16	24	40	2015 San Bernardino attack: A married couple opened fire on the husband's colleagues at a work training event. They killed fourteen people and injured twenty-four before being killed in a shootout with police. Pipe bombs set at their residence failed to detonate. The two perpetrators are believed to have been radicalized, though not believed to have been directly connected to a specific foreign terrorist organization.
November 27, 2015	Colorado Springs, Colorado	3	9	12	Colorado Springs Planned Parenthood shooting: A man killed two civilians and a police officer and wounded nine others inside a Planned Parenthood clinic before surrendering to police. The shootings are suspected to have been motivated by the suspect's anti-abortion views.
November 15, 2015	Anderson County, Texas	6	0	6	2015 Texas campsite shooting: During a camping trip, seven members of an extended family were being shot at by the campsite's original owner near Palestine, who was aggrieved with losing his family's land after it was put on sale and sold to one of the victims. Six of the seven victims died from the shooting, while the sole survivor remained unharmed and called the police, leading to Hudson's capture. Hudson was convicted of capital murder and sentenced to death in 2017.
October 9, 2015	Flagstaff, Arizona	1	3	4	2015 Northern Arizona University shooting: A freshman at Northern Arizona University shot four students, killing one.
October 1, 2015	Roseburg, Oregon	10	8	18	2015 Umpqua Community College shooting: A student at Umpqua Community College killed nine people and injured eight others on the college campus. After being wounded by police officers, he killed himself.
August 8, 2015	Harris County, Texas	8	0	8	2015 Harris County shooting: A man broke into his ex-girlfriend's home and held her hostage along with her husband and six children, one of whom was his son. Over the course of nine hours, he killed everyone in the home. After a shootout with police, he surrendered and was taken into custody.
July 23, 2015	Lafayette, Louisiana	3	9	12	2015 Lafayette shooting: A gunman killed two people and injured nine in a shooting at a movie theater. After trying to blend into the crowd leaving the theater, the gunman heard sirens, returned to the theater, and killed himself.
July 16, 2015	Chattanooga, Tennessee	6	2	8	2015 Chattanooga shootings: A man committed a drive-by shooting at a military recruitment center in a strip mall, wounding one Marine. With police in pursuit, he drove to a U.S. Navy Reserve center and rammed his vehicle through a gate. He fatally wounded a Navy sailor, killed four Marines, and wounded a police officer before being killed by a naval commander. The FBI later determined the gunman had been motivated by propaganda published by terrorist organizations.
June 17, 2015	Charleston, South Carolina	9	1	10	Charleston church shooting: A white supremacist named Dylann Roof killed nine black people during a prayer service at the Emanuel African Methodist Episcopal Church, wounding one other. He was taken into custody by police, and later said that he committed the shootings in an attempt to start a "race war".
May 17, 2015	Waco, Texas	9	18	27	2015 Waco shootout: Gunfire broke out at a restaurant where members of several motorcycle clubs had gathered to discuss political rights for motorcyclists. Members of the clubs and police were both involved in the gunfire. Nine people were killed and eighteen were injured in the shootout, all members of the motorcycle clubs. The shooting may have resulted from a territorial dispute between two of the motorcycle clubs.
February 26, 2015	Tyrone, Missouri	8	1	9	2015 Tyrone, Missouri, shootings: A man killed seven people and wounded one after going door-to-door and shooting people in four separate homes. Four of the people he killed were family members. The man then killed himself. The shooting was possibly motivated by the man finding his mother dead from natural causes.

=== 2014 ===
Date	Location	Dead	Injured	Total	Description
December 15, 2014	Montgomery County, Pennsylvania	6	0	6	2014 Montgomery County shootings: Six people were found dead with gunshot wounds and one wounded by stabbing and blunt-force trauma in three locations across Montgomery County. The shooter was found dead the next day after committing suicide by overdose. One of the victims was the shooter's ex-wife, the others were her relatives.
October 24, 2014	Marysville, Washington	5	1	6	2014 Marysville Pilchuck High School shooting: A fifteen-year-old killed four people and injured one other in the cafeteria of Marysville Pilchuck High School before killing himself.
July 9, 2014	Spring, Texas	6	1	7	2014 Harris County shooting: A man killed six of his family members and wounding a seventh. He was arrested after a brief chase and a standoff that lasted several hours.
May 23, 2014	Isla Vista, California	4	7	11	2014 Isla Vista attacks: Several hours after stabbing and killing his two roommates and their friend, 22-year-old Elliot Rodger drove to a sorority house near the University of California, Santa Barbara and knocked on the door. After receiving no answer, he shot three women from another sorority who were walking near the sorority house, killing two. He then drove to a delicatessen where he shot and killed a man inside. Rodger continued to drive around Isla Vista and shoot and hit at random people from within his vehicle before killing himself with a gunshot. The attack is believed to have been motivated by the killer's hatred of women and frustration with his dating and family life.
April 2, 2014	Fort Hood, Texas	4	12	16	2014 Fort Hood shootings: After being denied leave from the Fort Hood military base where he was stationed, a man killed three people and injured twelve by gunfire before killing himself.
February 20, 2014	Alturas, California	4	2	6	2014 Cedarville Rancheria tribal office shooting: A former tribal chairwoman opened fire during an eviction hearing, killing four people, including three family members, and injuring two others. One gunshot victim was also stabbed.

=== 2013 ===
Date	Location	Dead	Injured	Total	Description
November 1, 2013	Los Angeles, California	1	4	5	2013 Los Angeles International Airport shooting: A man entered the Los Angeles International Airport, killed a TSA agent, and wounded three other people. He was injured when shot several times by police.
September 16, 2013	Washington D.C.	13	3	16	Washington Navy Yard shooting: A gunman entered the Naval Sea Systems Command headquarters in the Washington Navy Yard with a civilian contractor pass. He killed twelve people and injured three by gunfire before being killed by police.
August 5, 2013	Saylorsburg, Pennsylvania	3	4	7	Ross Township Municipal Building shooting: A man entered a meeting of township supervisors and killed three people, injuring three others. The gunman was also injured when his gun went off and hit his own leg as two men wrestled him to the ground and took away his weapon. The shooting was suspected to be motivated by a longstanding feud in which the gunman's property rights had been taken away. He was sentenced to life in prison.
July 26, 2013	Hialeah, Florida	7	0	7	2013 Hialeah shooting: A man lit his apartment on fire and killed six other people in his apartment building before being killed by a SWAT team.
June 7, 2013	Santa Monica, California	6	2	8	2013 Santa Monica Shootings: A man killed his family and burned down his house before committing a mass shooting at Santa Monica College. He was later killed in a shootout with police.
March 13, 2013	Mohawk and Herkimer, New York	5	2	7	Herkimer County shootings: A man set fire to his apartment, shot and killed two people and injured two others at a barbershop, and shot and killed two people at a car wash. The shooter was cornered in an abandoned bar by police, leading to an overnight standoff. A police dog was sent into the building the next morning: when the man shot and killed the dog, the police returned fire, killing the man.
January 19, 2013	South Valley, New Mexico	5	0	5	2013 South Valley homicides: A fifteen-year-old murdered his parents and three siblings in their home. He was arrested by police.

=== 2012 ===
Date	Location	Dead	Injured	Total	Description
December 24, 2012	Webster, New York	4	3	7	2012 Webster shooting: A man set fire to his home and the family car before opening fire on responding firefighters, two were killed and three wounded before he committed suicide, a fourth body was found in the house.
December 14, 2012	Newtown, Connecticut	28	2	30	Sandy Hook Elementary School shooting: A 20-year-old man killed his mother before shooting and killing twenty grade one children as well as six adults at Sandy Hook Elementary School in Newtown, Connecticut. He then committed suicide before authorities could apprehend him.
November 6, 2012	Fresno, California	3	2	5	2012 Fresno meat plant shooting: A man shot four coworkers, two fatally, at the meat processing plant he worked at before walking outside and fatally shooting himself in the head.
October 21, 2012	Brookfield, Wisconsin	4	4	8	Azana Spa shooting: The perpetrator drove to his ex-wife's work place and waited until she was there to confront her and shot and killed her and two other women, and injured four others before committing suicide.
September 27, 2012	Minneapolis, Minnesota	7	2	9	Minneapolis firm shooting: A former employee entered a local sign-making business, and killed five and wounded four; two of the four later died of their wounds, the perpetrator committed suicide.
August 24, 2012	New York City, New York	2	9	11	2012 Empire State Building shooting: A man shot and killed a former co-worker before engaging in a shoot-out with the New York police in which nine bystanders were wounded and the perpetrator was killed.
August 16, 2012	St. John the Baptist Parish, Louisiana	2	4	6	2012 shootings of St. John the Baptist Parish police officers: Two men, Kyle David Joekel and Brian Lyn Smith, who were alleged members of the sovereign citizen movement, conducted a mass shooting that led to the deaths of two sheriff's deputies and another two police officers were wounded. Both perpetrators were wounded and sent to hospital, and later charged with first-degree murder. Smith was later detained in a mental facility after he was deemed incompetent to stand trial, while Joekel was found guilty of first-degree murder and sentenced to death.
August 13, 2012	College Station, Texas	3	4	7	2012 College Station shooting: The perpetrator fatally shot an officer attempting to serve him a notice to appear in court, he then injured a neighbor and engaged in a shootout with responding officers until he was killed by the officers.
August 9, 2012	Wicksburg, Alabama	3	1	4	2012 Wicksburg nightclub shooting: The perpetrator, who was driven out of a nightclub due to unruly behaviour, retaliated by returning to the premises with a pistol, shooting four people inside the nightclub, leading to the deaths of three people and one person wounded. The gunman, Ryan Clark Petersen, was convicted of capital murder and sentenced to death.
August 5, 2012	Oak Creek, Wisconsin	8	3	11	Wisconsin Sikh temple shooting: The perpetrator, a member of the Hammerskins and various white power and neo-Nazi bands, fatally shot seven people at a Sikh temple before being killed by responding police officers.
July 20, 2012	Aurora, Colorado	12	58	70	2012 Aurora theater shooting: A shooter, 24-year-old James Eagan Holmes, stormed a late-night premiere of The Dark Knight Rises and shot and killed twelve people, and wounded seventy others, fifty-eight of which were by gunfire. He was sentenced to life in prison without the possibility of parole.
May 30, 2012	Seattle, Washington	6	1	7	2012 Seattle café shootings: A patron who had been previously thrown out of the cafe, entered and killed four people and wounded one, shortly after he killed a woman during a carjacking and then committed suicide.
May 2, 2012	Gilbert, Arizona	5	0	5	J. T. Ready: A neo-Nazi shot and killed his girlfriend, her daughter, the daughter's boyfriend, and their infant daughter, before killing himself.
April 2, 2012	Oakland, California	7	3	10	2012 Oikos University shooting: A former student opened fire in a classroom and fatally shot seven people, leaving three wounded.
March 14, 2012	Beaumont, Texas	1	3	4	2012 Jefferson County, Texas, courthouse shooting: A man on trial for sexually assaulting his daughter attempted to fatally shoot his daughter. In the process, he injured his daughter and 2 other women and killed another woman.
February 27, 2012	Chardon, Ohio	3	3	6	2012 Chardon High School shooting: A seventeen-year-old entered Chardon High School and fired at students sitting in the cafeteria, killing three and wounding three others before being arrested.

=== 2011 ===
Date	Location	Dead	Injured	Total	Description
December 16, 2011	Irwindale, California	3	2	5	Southern California Edison shooting: An employee opened fire during the workday, and killed two and wounded two others before committing suicide.
October 12, 2011	Seal Beach, California	8	1	9	2011 Seal Beach shooting: A man entered his ex-wife's workplace and shot and killed eight people and injured one. He then fled the scene and was later arrested.
September 6, 2011	Carson City, Nevada	5	7	12	2011 Carson City IHOP shooting: A man opened fire inside and outside an IHOP, and then targeted nearby local businesses. He killed four people and injured seven before committing suicide.
August 7, 2011	Copley Township, Ohio	8	1	9	2011 Copley Township shooting: A man killed seven people; including a 16-year-old and an 11-year-old, and injured one between three homes before being killed by responding police.
July 7, 2011	Grand Rapids, Michigan	8	2	10	2011 Grand Rapids shootings: A man killed seven people and wounded two in a spree shooting in two homes, then took hostages in a third before committing suicide.
June 19, 2011	Medford, New York	4	0	4	2011 Medford pharmacy shooting: A man killed four people in a pharmacy robbery gone wrong. He was sentenced to life imprisonment.
January 8, 2011	Casas Adobes, Arizona	6	13	19	2011 Tucson shooting: A man killed six people and injured thirteen by gunfire during an assassination attempt of U.S. Representative Gabrielle Giffords before he was tackled and arrested. Giffords was wounded in the attack but survived.

=== 2010 ===
Date	Location	Dead	Injured	Total	Description
August 14, 2010	Buffalo, New York	5	3	8	2010 City Grill shooting: During a gang-related dispute at a wedding anniversary party at the City Grill restaurant, Riccardo McCray shot 10 rounds in 17 seconds killing 3 immediately and injuring 5, 2 others died later.
August 3, 2010	Manchester, Connecticut	9	2	11	Hartford Beer Distributors shooting: An employee of Hartford Distributors, a beer distribution company, was fired. In retaliation he shot and killed eight coworkers and injured two others before committing suicide.
May 20, 2010	West Memphis, Arkansas	4	2	6	2010 West Memphis police shootings: A father and son shot two police officers during a traffic stop, killing both, before getting into a shootout with officers in a Walmart parking lot. In the shootout both shooters were killed and two more officers wounded.
February 12, 2010	Huntsville, Alabama	3	3	6	2010 University of Alabama in Huntsville shooting: A biology professor opened fire on other faculty members, killing three and injuring three others, before she was arrested.
January 19–20, 2010	Appomattox, Virginia	8	0	8	2010 Appomattox shootings: A man shot and killed four family members and four other individuals before being apprehended by police.
January 12, 2010	Kennesaw, Georgia	4	1	5	Penske office shooting: A former employee of a Penske truck rental business shot five people, four employees and one customer, at the business. Four people were killed and a fifth injured.
January 7, 2010	St. Louis, Missouri	4	5	9	ABB plant shooting: An employee opened fire in the parking lot of an ABB Group power plant before entering the factory. He killed three people and injured five before committing suicide.

== See also ==
- List of school shootings in the United States by death toll
- List of school shootings in the United States (before 2000)
- List of school shootings in the United States (2000–present)
- List of unsuccessful attacks related to schools
- Mass shootings in the United States#Deadliest mass shootings since 1949
- List of rampage killers in the United States
- List of countries by firearm-related death rate
- List of countries by intentional homicide rate
- Percent of households with guns by country
- Estimated number of civilian guns per capita by country
- Gun violence in the United States
