= Crime in Washington =

Crime in Washington may refer to:

- Crime in Washington (state)
- Crime in Washington, D.C.
