= Crime in Washington (state) =

Washington
- Crime rates* (2018)

Violent crimes
- Rape: 45.3
- Robbery: 73.9
- Aggravated assault: 189.1
- Total violent crime: 311.5

Property crimes
- Burglary: 533.5
- Larceny-theft: 2045.4
- Motor vehicle theft: 367.3
- Total property crime: 2946.2
- Notes *Number of reported crimes per 100,000 population. Source: FBI UCS Annual Crime Reports 2018

Crime rates in the state of Washington grew rapidly to large levels from 1960 to 1980, however slowed in growth from 1980 onward. Although the cause of this drop in crime growth from the 1980s cannot be directly determined, it was believed to have been a result from several law enforcement initiatives & policies implemented throughout the state of Washington and across the United States, such as abortion access.

In 2013, the state of Washington was ranked 30th for the states with the highest level of violent crime levels across the United States. In 2016, the city of Seattle reported the highest level of violent crime across all cities in the state of Washington. The city of Tacoma was the next city with the highest level of violent crime.

In response to crime throughout Washington, several programs, strategies, Legislature and Acts have been implemented to reduce the levels of crime as well as prevent crime from occurring.

== History of Crime ==
The following table displays the number of crimes for different categories in every decade from 1960 to 2010.

Number of crimes in Washington from 1960 to 2010 (Every decade)
Year	Population	Violent				Property			
Year	Population	Violent	Forcible Rape	Murder	Aggravated Assault	Property	Burglary	Larceny-Theft	Vehicle Theft
1960	2,853,214	1,616	166	61	503	62,072	13,098	43,657	4,507
1970	3,409,169	7,546	613	120	3,624	158,858	49,244	97,279	12,335
1980	4,113,331	19,098	2,169	225	11,146	265,338	76,598	172,468	16,272
1990	4,866,692	24,410	3,115	238	14,731	278,440	61,460	195,221	21,759
2000	5,894,121	21,788	2,737	196	13,043	279,144	53,476	190,650	35,018
2010	6,742,950	21,138	2,579	154	12,476	249,426	55,192	168,490	25,744

=== Notable crimes ===
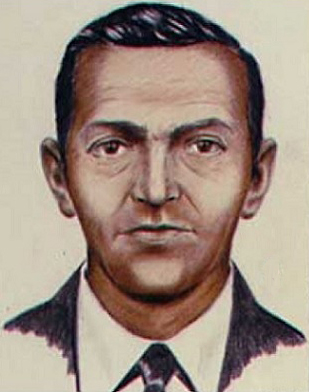
FBI composite sketch of the man known as D.B. Cooper

- May 24, 1935: The George Weyerhaeuser kidnapping. 9 year old George Weyerhaeuser was kidnapped off the street in daytime in the city of Tacoma, Washington. A ransom of US$200,000 (approx. US$3,742,905 today) was demanded and paid in June of that year to secure the release of Weyerhaeuser from his captors.
- February 18, 1961: The Peoples National Bank burglary. The safe deposit vault of the Peoples National Bank was broken into by Wells Benner van Steenbergh, Jr, who had proceeded to steal US$45,689.53 (approx. US$391,782.37 today). His motive was to provide for his family as he felt "they deserved more than they were getting from me."
- November 24, 1971: D. B. Cooper. An unidentified man using the alias Dan Cooper, hijacked a Boeing 727 Aircraft in the airspace between Seattle, Washington and Portland, Oregon. He had a bomb in his briefcase and demanded a ransom of US$200,000 (approx. US$1,266,118.52 today), 4 parachutes and a fuel truck to refuel the flight once it had landed to deliver to ransom. Once the passengers on board were released and the flight had taken off, he escaped by parachuting out of the plane sometime at night. The case remains unsolved to this day and stands as one of the few cases of aircraft hijacking to be unsolved in the history of commercial aviation.

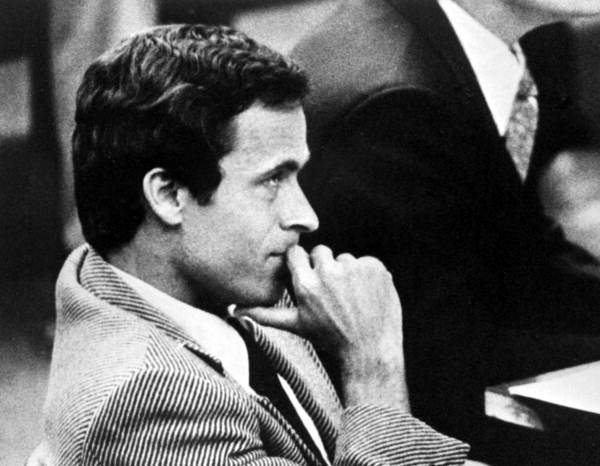
Serial killer Ted Bundy in court

- 1973–1978: Serial murders by Ted Bundy. An American serial killer who was convicted of 30 murders which took place between 1973 and 1978. He started his crimes in the state of Washington and committed a total of 11 murders there. Through a series of arrests, incarcerations and escapes from prison since 1975, Bundy was arrested for the last time on 1978 and sentenced to death for the third time. He was executed by way of electrocution on January 24, 1989.
- February 18, 1983: Wah Mee Massacre. A robbery and shooting of 13 people in the gambling club Wah Mee in the Chinatown-International District in Seattle. The motive of the criminals was to rob the club for money and kill any witnesses. There was only one survivor who later provided the evidence and testimony that was used to convict the criminals.
- 1980s-1990s: Serial murders by Gary Ridgway. An American serial killer who was convicted of 49 out of the 71 murders he confessed to. The majority of these murders were during the 1980s where the bodies of the victims were dumped at locations around Washington, notably at the Green River and Seattle-Tacoma International Airport.

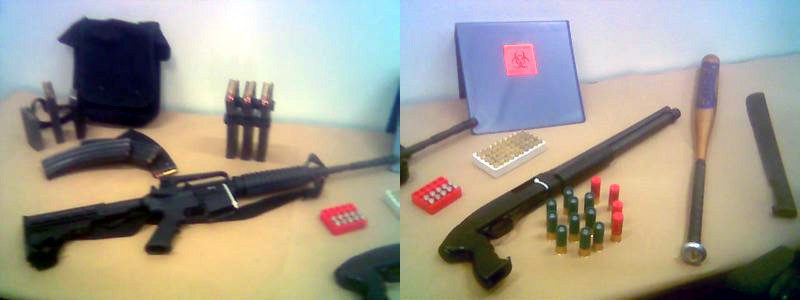
Kyle Huff's weapons & ammunition used in the Capitol Hill Massacre

- July 7, 1993: Murder of Mia Zapata. 27-year-old Mia Zapata was an American musician who was murdered on her way back from a bar in Seattle, Washington. Her body had been discovered shortly after with evidence of her being beaten and assaulted, however the killer could not be determined. The case remained unsolved for almost 10 years until the killer, Jesus Mezquia, was arrested and charged with the murder based on DNA evidence from crimes he committed in 2002, which ultimately connected him to the murder. He was sentenced to 36 years prison in January 2003.
- 25 March 2006: Capitol Hill Massacre. 28-year-old Kyle Huff shot and killed 6 people while injuring 2 at an after-party in the Capitol Hill area of Seattle. The perpetrator committed suicide soon after at the scene. It was the largest mass-murder in Seattle since the Wah Mee Massacre in 1983.
- May 30, 2012: The Seattle cafe shooting spree: 51-year-old Ian Lee Stawicki went on a killing spree starting from Café Racer in the University District of Seattle to Town Hall Seattle, resulting in the deaths of 5 and the injury of 1. As police were searching his last known position, a detective had located Stawicki on a street. When police began to close in on Stawicki, he committed suicide by way of a gunshot to his head with his firearm.
- June 13, 2023: Killing of Eina Kwon. Kwon and her husband, two restaurateurs, were sitting in their car in Belltown when Cordell Maurice Goosby fired six shots from a stolen automatic handgun into their car, seemingly at random. Kwon was eight months pregnant at the time; both her and her child died. Kwon's husband was shot in the arm but recovered.
- October 21, 2024: Fall City murders. Two parents and three of their children were shot to death at their home near Fall City in King County. Another child in the family was injured, but survived the attack. The suspect is the eldest child in the family, who allegedly staged the crime scene to look like a murder-suicide committed by his younger brother.

== Trends in Crime ==
=== 1960 to 1980 ===
The total number of violent crimes that occurred from the beginning of 1960 rose 470% from 1,616 to 8,243 cases towards the end of the decade. The majority of total crimes committed were classified as property crime, with a total figure of 62,072 in 1960. This increased to 149,468 cases at the end of the decade which was the only category with the highest increase in cases. Crimes of murder also rose in cases by 765 throughout the 1960s. The 1970s had an increase in murder cases by 1,469 throughout the decade, a more than 50% increase compared to cases recorded throughout the 60s. Although murder cases in the 70s were the lowest of crimes reported under violent crimes, they had the highest amount of reported arrests per reported crimes averaging 19.82%. Violent crimes further rose to 19,098 cases as well as property crimes rising to 289,235 cases by the end of the 1970s. Throughout this time period, although no direct cause could be determined, it was believed that part of the continuing increases in crime was widely due to soft policies towards parole release of criminals, poor treatment of prisoners and weak rehabilitation programs which all led to re-offending.

=== 1980 to 2000 ===
Despite the increase in population, increases in crime levels plummeted in most categories for the first time in 30 years since 1960. Property crime had declined, growing only by 13,302 cases by the end of the 1980s compared to the beginning of the decade. There were also notable drops in the number of murders, with only an increase to 238 cases by the end of the 1980s. While there is no determinate cause to this significant drop in crime, it was widely believed that new and harsh law enforcement initiatives led to the decrease in crime across both Washington state and the United States. Violent crime grew by 28% throughout the 80s to 24,410 cases by the end of 1990. This growth rate later dropped by 11% with the total number of cases of violent crime standing at 21,788 at the end of 2000. This reduction in violent crime was believed to originate from the introduction of new gun control laws and laws allowing concealed carry, however the lack of evidence towards these claims dismissed the belief. Additionally, there was also data to suggest that the increase in taxpayer costs contributed to decreasing crime rates through funding towards the criminal justice system in Washington.

== Responses to Crime ==
=== Aged-based Programs ===
These are programs aimed at specific age ranges with the overall purpose to prevent & reduce the risk of crimes and criminals occurring.

==== Early Childhood Programs ====
Aimed at children before they are admitted to kindergarten.

- Nurse Home Visitation Program: This involves nurses visiting homes during a woman's pregnancy and up to 2 years after the child is born with the goal of aiding the child's development and providing support & parent training to parents. The purpose of this program is to assist low-income, at-risk pregnant women who are bearing their first child. Participants pay to enter the program, whose benefit is determined by the reduction in taxpayer costs, where part of that benefit is further used to fund the incarceration costs of criminals in prison through income taxation. Despite initial years of negative returns, over time this margin of loss has diminished, generating monetary benefit for a taxpayer through less spending on law enforcement and prison housing funding as a result of less crime & criminals.
- Early Childhood Education for Disadvantaged Youth: This involves the provision of preschool and childcare services, including education. This is intended to support low-income families or parents with children of ages 3 or 4 to prevent them from committing crimes in the future.

==== Middle Childhood & Adolescent Programs ====
Aimed at children enlisted from Grade 1 of the US Schooling System to those under 18 and not classified as a juvenile offender.

- The Seattle Social Development Project: This program is aimed at students from Grade 1 to Grade 6 with the goal of training teachers to better control and manage classrooms, as well as to promote a student's bond with the school & family. The purpose of this program is to prevent multiple factors from occurring that are believed to contribute to a crime being committed such as drug abuse, alcohol abuse, violence and delinquency among other factors. In the initial run of the program, it was concluded that various levels of student participation and intervention led to various results, with full intervention reporting more family & school commitment and bond level.

=== Strategies ===
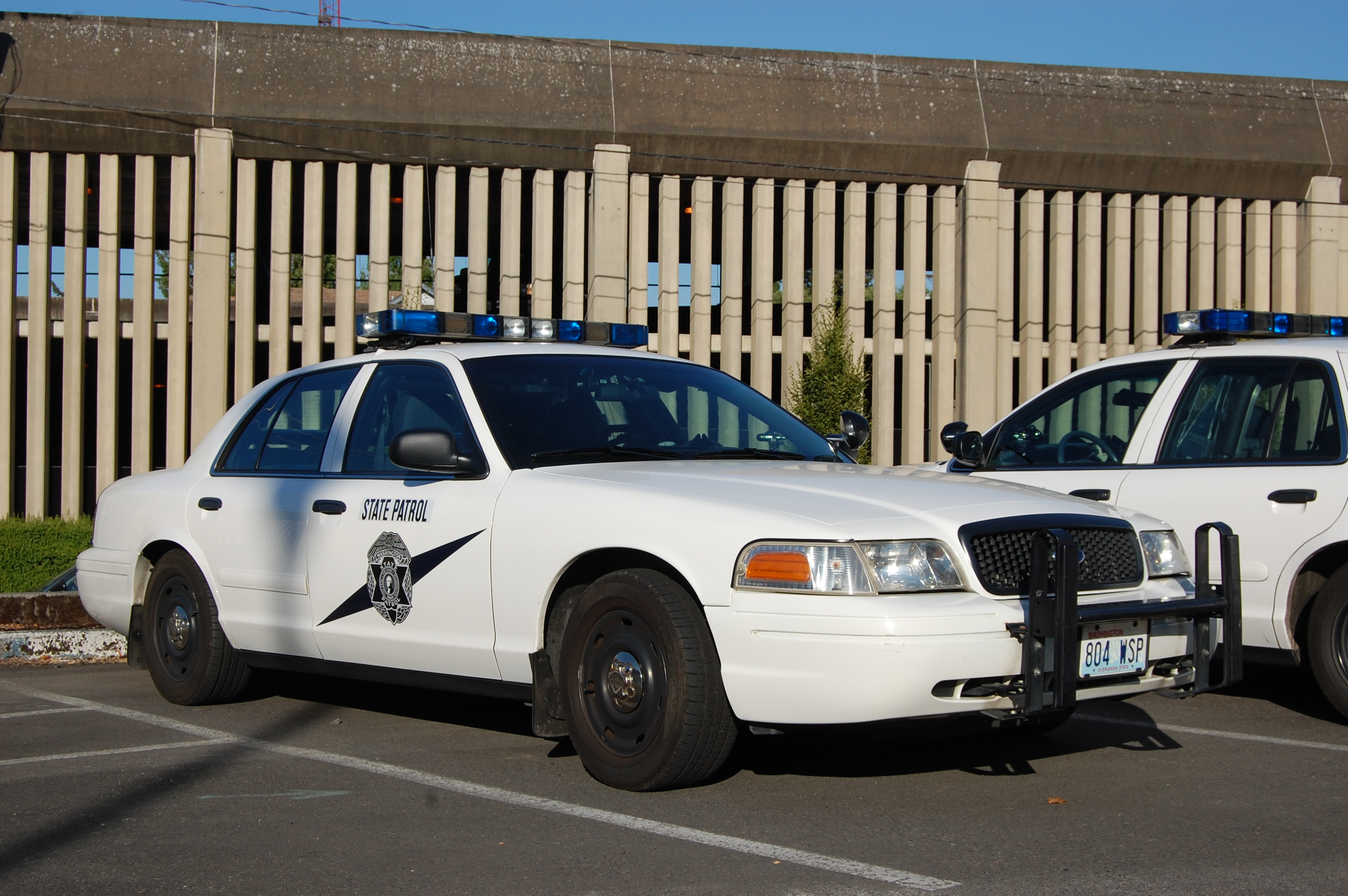
Washington State Patrol's Crown Victoria Car. These cars were part of a new fleet of patrol cars to be used state-wide from 2012.

These are devised and funded by various state, federal and local agencies in Washington state which are later put into implementation by policymakers.

- Multi-Jurisdictional Narcotics Task Forces: These are law enforcement task forces whose purpose is to conduct investigation, arrest and prosecute drug traffickers with medium to high levels of experience. Some results from the operation of these task forces include: Millions of US dollars' worth of drugs & assets in large quantities seized and removed from the streets, detailed information on the drug network in Washington as well as high levels of participation and commitment from agencies & personnel that are a part of these task forces.
- Drug Courts: These are responsible for providing supervised drug treatment for criminals deemed non-violent as an alternative to serving time in prison. There are different courts specific to dealing with different factors pertaining to the criminal such as age, mental health and category of drug use.
- Criminal History Records project: Creation of a database to report and compile various records for criminals, specifically to track their criminal history.
- Tribal Law Enforcement Assistance: Responsible for funding projects that assist local tribal law enforcement agencies in improving the community through various strategies such as the training of officers and sheriffs, community policing and prevention of drug use & violence.

== Capital punishment laws ==
As of October 11, 2018, Capital punishment was no longer applied in this state.

== See also ==
- Crime in the United States
- Law of Washington
