= Circus Contraption =

American circus/vaudeville/dark cabaret troupe

- Origin: Seattle, Washington
- Genres: Vaudeville, dark cabaret
- Years active: 1998-2009
- Past members: Joseph Vito "Dexter Mantooth" Albanese; Evelyn "Acrophelia" Bittner; Sari "Pinky d'Ambrosia" Breznau; Erin Brindley; David "Armitage Shanks" Crellin; Max "Fresco Rose" Davis; Colin "Ernesto Cellini" Ernst; Kevin "Chameleo" Hinshaw; Jenny "Nova Jo Yaco" Iacobucci; Drew "Shmootzi the Clod" Keriakedes; Whitney "Delphinia Spit" Lawless; Matt "Bunny LaMonte" Manges; Kari "Sally Pepper" Podgorski; Terry "The Carnie" Podgorski; Orycteropus "Ory" Afer; Lara "Darty Kangoo" Paxton; Hugh "Salamity Clam" Sutton; Jeff "Buster Speck" Walker; Annastasia "Esmeralda Diamond" Workman; Jason "Dr. Loligo Calamari" Williams
- Website: http://circuscontraption.com/

Circus Contraption (founded in 1998) was the name of a one-ring circus, vaudeville and dark cabaret troupe based in Seattle, Washington. The troupe, which employs about a dozen performers, uses live, original music paired with old-style circus performances, heavily influenced by cabaret and vaudeville acts. The shows are conceived for adults and usually feature some mature content.

The troupe first performed at the Seattle Fringe Theatre Festival, but soon branched out to other venues around the U.S., including a U.S. tour in 2005. Their local and touring shows, with names like "Bracing Curative," "Eat Circus," "The Beer, Bread & Cheese Cabaret," "A Raree Show," and "Gallimaufry: An Evening of Jiggery-Pokery," played to sold-out audiences.

The troupe disbanded in 2009. Joe Albanese (aka Dexter Mantooth), Drew Keriakedes (aka Shmootzi the Clod), and three other victims were killed in the Cafe Racer shooting on May 30, 2012.

== Members ==
Principal members

- Joseph Vito "Dexter Mantooth" Albanese – bassist, leather craftsman
- Evelyn "Acrophelia" Bittner – acrobat, costumer, stilt walker
- Sari "Pinky d'Ambrosia" Breznau – costumer, vocalist, trumpeter, dancer
- Erin Brindley – managing director
- David "Armitage Shanks" Crellin – co-founder, ringmaster, vocalist, percussionist, songwriter, mask maker, fire-eater
- Max "Fresco Rose" Davis – acrobat, aerialist, dancer
- Colin "Ernesto Cellini" Ernst – juggler, trombonist, welder, contraption engineer, composer
- Kevin "Chameleo" Hinshaw – clarinetist, music director, pianist, composer, webmaster, director of small packages
- Jenny "Nova Jo Yaco" Iacobucci – dancer, stilt walker, puppeteer, costumer
- Drew "Shmootzie the Clod" Keriakedes – sousaphonist, ukulelist, accordionist, banjo player, vocalist, songwriter
- Whitney "Delphinia Spit" Lawless – clown, acrobat, costumer
- Matt "Bunny LaMonte" Manges – drummer, aerialist, acrobat, songwriter, stuntman
- Kari "Sally Pepper" Podgorski – aerialist, dancer, acrobat, costumer, stilt walker
- Terry "The Carnie" Podgorski – production manager, set designer
- Orycteropus "Ory" Afer – mascot
- Lara "Darty Kangoo" Paxton – co-founder, artistic director, aerialist, dancer, costumer, acrobat, stilt walker, fortune teller
- Hugh "Salamity Clam" Sutton – accordionist, pianist
- Jeff "Buster Speck" Walker – trombonist
- Annastasia "Esmeralda Diamond" Workman – accordion player, piano player
- Jason "Dr. Loligo Calamari" Williams – acrobat, rigger, contraption engineer, stilt walker

Occasional guest stars

- Greg "Harold Smaude" Adair – accordionist, painter and illustrator
- Pavel Merzo – clown
- James Jay – juggler
- Melissa Kerber – aerialist
- Spencer and Gary "The Twins" Luke – unknown

== Discography ==
- Our Latest Catalogue CD (2001)
- Gallimaufry CD (2004)
- Grand American Traveling Dime Museum CD (2005)
- The Half Wit's Descent CD (2008)
- The Show to End All Shows CD (2010)
