= Capitol Hill Arts Center =

Theater in Seattle, Washington, US

Coordinates: 47°36′57″N 122°19′02″W

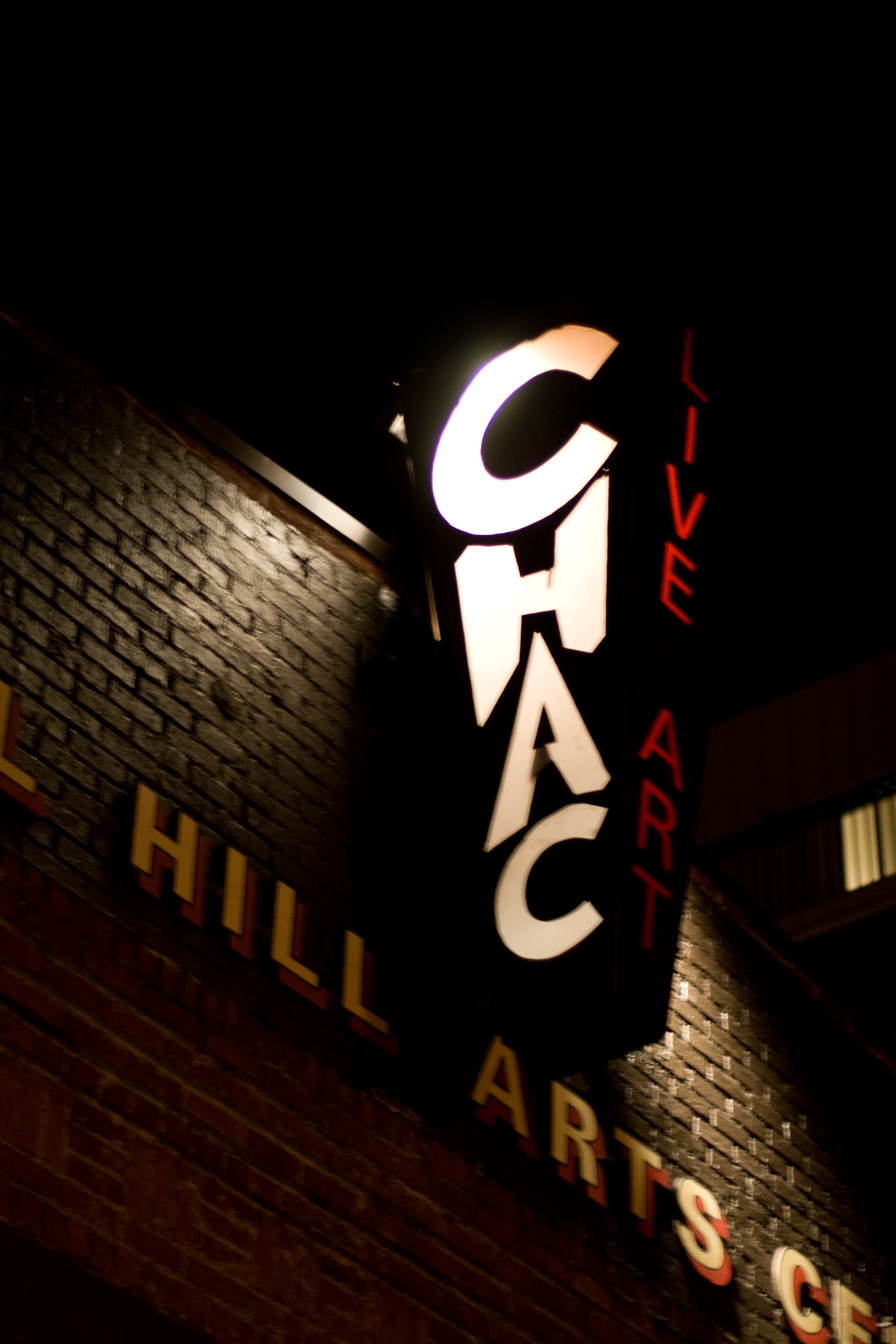
Capitol Hill Arts Center sign

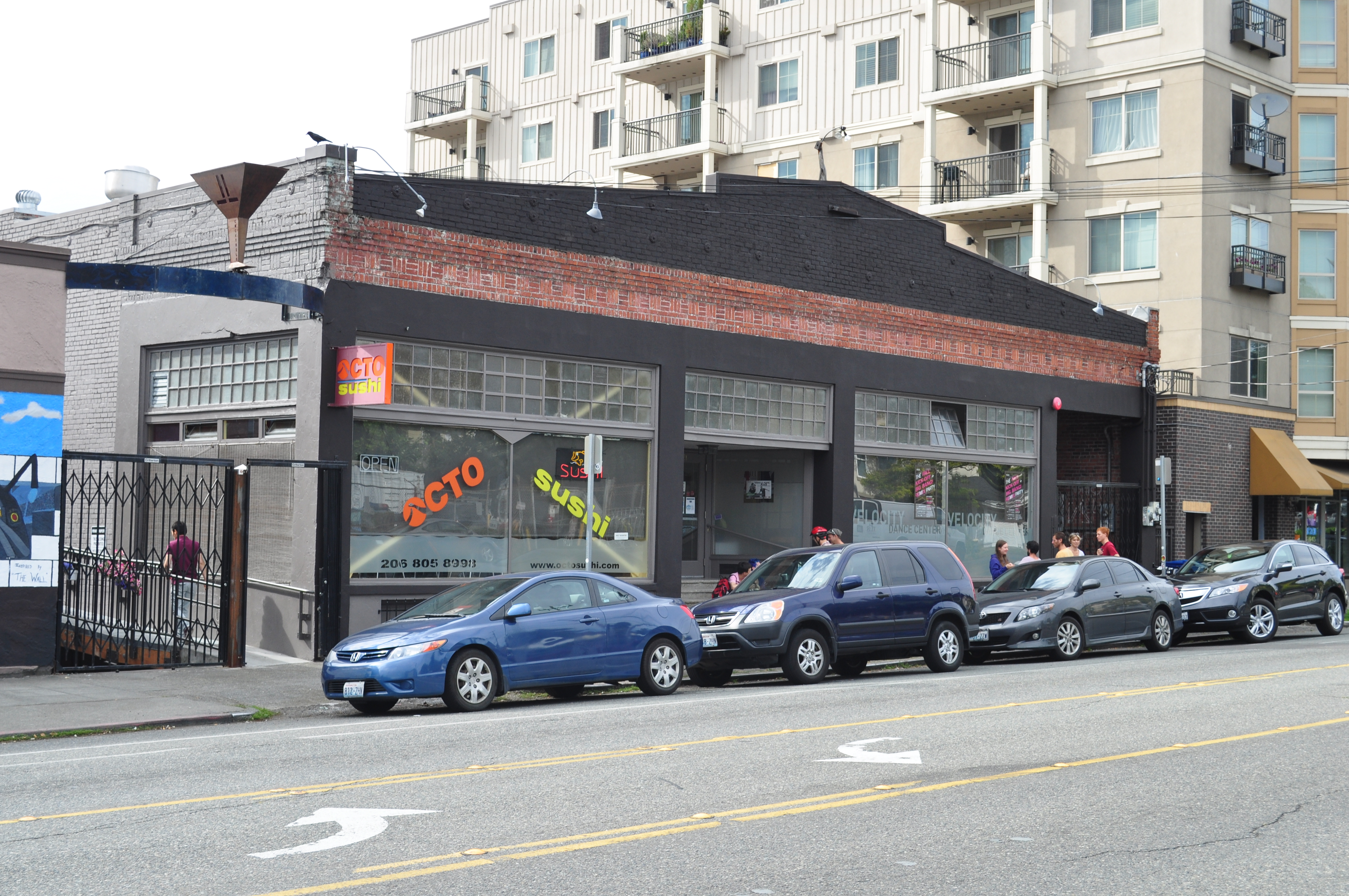
The former Capitol Hill Arts Center, photographed in 2012.

Capitol Hill Arts Center, also known by its acronym CHAC (pronounced "shack"), was a performing arts center located in the Capitol Hill neighborhood of Seattle, Washington. CHAC operated two performance spaces in the building, most widely known for its theatre.

The center was founded in 2002 by Matthew Kwatinetz. CHAC was acknowledged as producing some of the most exciting theatre in Seattle: from Bertolt Brecht's The Resistible Rise of Arturo Ui and Clifford Odets' Waiting for Lefty to the Pacific Northwest premiere of Dario Fo's Archangels Don't Play Pinball.

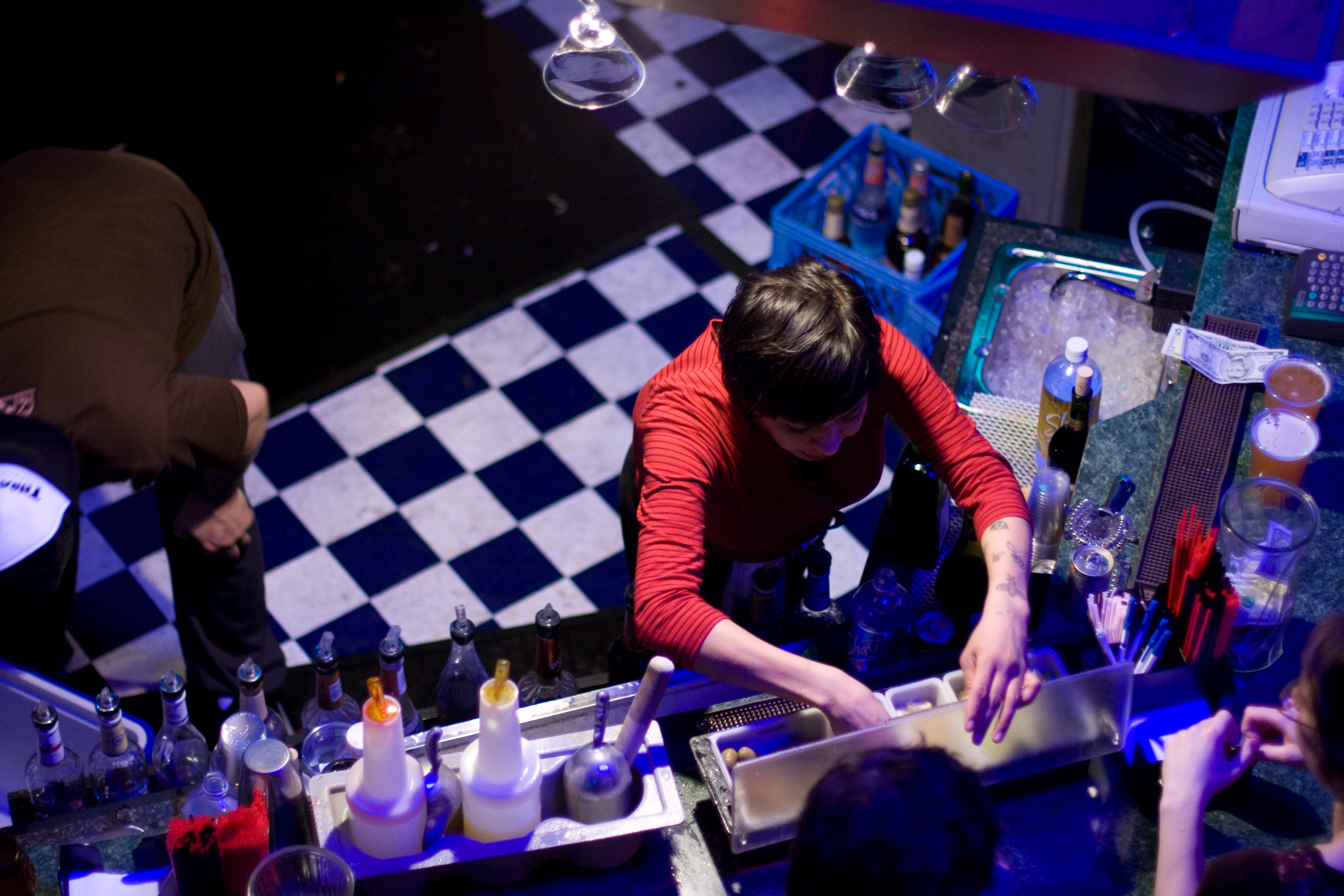
Overhead view of bar

On the evening of Friday, March 24, 2006, CHAC was the venue of a zombie-themed rave called "Better Off Undead". Attendees of an afterparty after that rave were the victims of the Capitol Hill massacre. By nearly all accounts, CHAC itself had excellent security at the rave, and the only connection of the massacre to the rave was that the perpetrator and the victims attended the rave, and that one of the victims invited the perpetrator to the afterparty.

CHAC closed in 2007.
