= 2012 Seattle café shooting =

Spree shooting in Washington, U.S.

Coordinates: 47°40′17″N 122°19′02″W

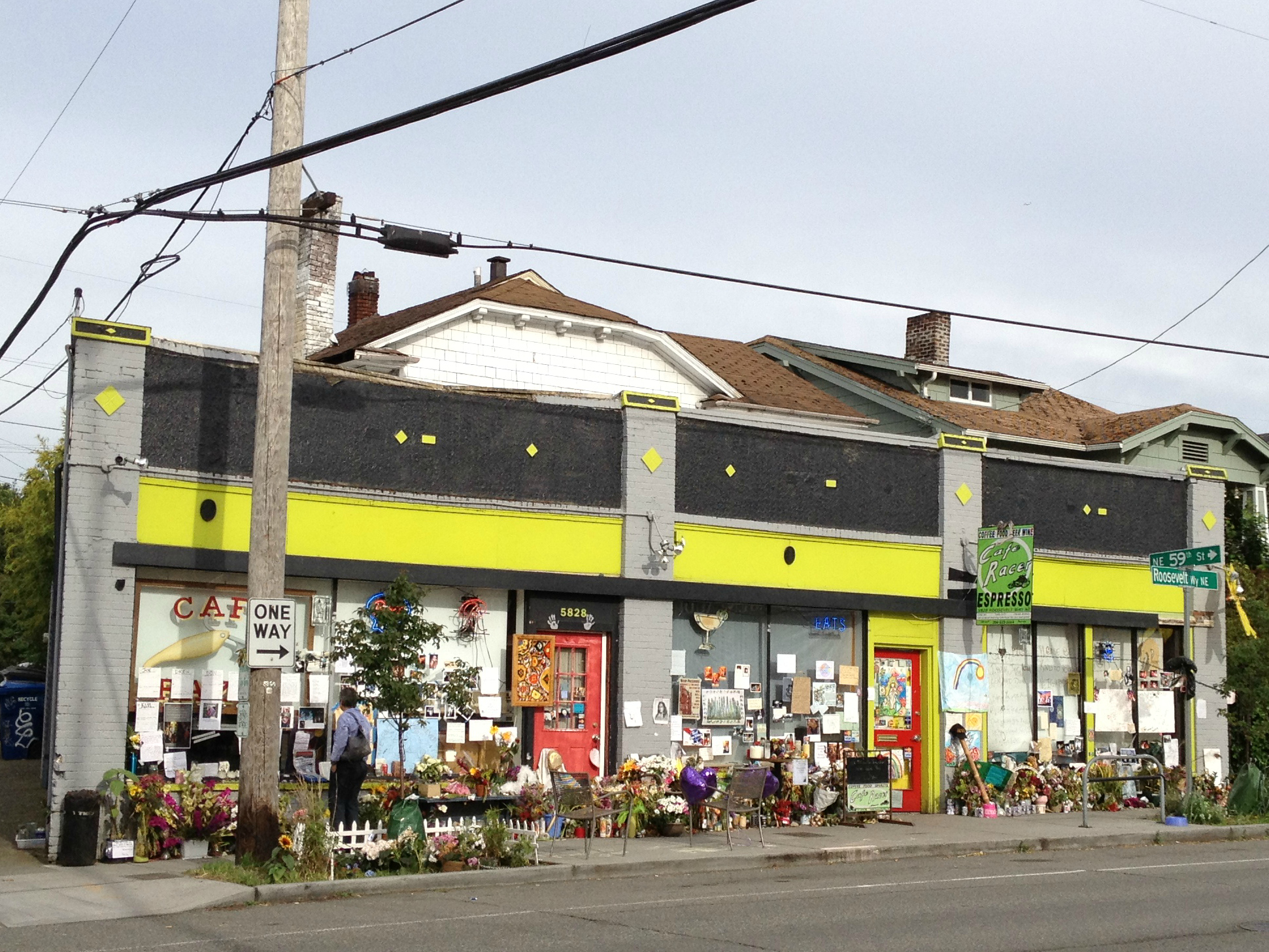
- Exterior of Café Racer
- Location: Seattle, Washington, U.S.
- Date: May 30, 2012; 14 years ago 10:57 a.m. (PDT)
- Attack type: Spree shooting; mass shooting; murder–suicide; mass murder
- Weapons: .45 caliber Remington 1911 R1 semi-automatic pistol; .45 caliber Colt New Agent Series 90 semi-automatic pistol
- Deaths: 6 (including the perpetrator)
- Injuries: 1
- Perpetrator: Ian Lee Stawicki
- Motive: Rage

On May 30, 2012, a spree shooting occurred at two locations in Seattle, Washington, United States. The shootings began with a mass shooting at Café Racer, resulting in the deaths of four patrons and injuring a fifth. Another woman was killed during a carjacking. The perpetrator, 40-year-old Ian Lee Stawicki, committed suicide the same day.

== Shootings ==
On May 30, 2012, just before 11:00 a.m., Stawicki walked into Café Racer in the University District of Seattle, Washington. The staff there recognized him from previously being thrown out, and reminded him of that. Stawicki lingered for a bit, and then walked near the door. He pulled one of his two pistols, both .45-caliber handguns, and shot his first victim in the back of the head. The man's body blocked the door, taking away an escape route. One man threw a bar stool and used a second to separate himself from Stawicki. The distraction allowed two or three people to escape through the door the shooter had blocked. Stawicki then went near the bar and shot the others execution-style, police say. As he left, Stawicki took a hat from one of the victims. Stawicki killed a total of four patrons at the café and wounded the café's chef.

Half an hour later, he killed a woman in a parking lot next to Town Hall Seattle on First Hill while carjacking her black Mercedes-Benz SUV. Later that afternoon just before 4:00 p.m., he died by suicide on a sidewalk in West Seattle as police closed in. The perpetrator previously owned six handguns (three 9mm handguns and three .45-caliber handguns), including the Remington 1911 R1 pistol he used in the shootings. As a result of the shootings, several schools, including Roosevelt High School and Nathan Eckstein Middle School, were put on lockdown for student safety.

== Perpetrator ==
Ian Lee Stawicki (September 16, 1971 – May 30, 2012) was identified as the perpetrator of the shooting. Stawicki had prior contacts with police but a relatively short record. Police say he had charges for domestic violence interference, fourth-degree assault, malicious mischief, and a 1989 charge for unlawfully carrying a weapon. However, court records show only a 1995 case for driving with a suspended license, which resulted in an adverse finding.

During the February 2008 case, police officers were called to the Magnolia home of Stawicki and his then-girlfriend to find the victim with a bloody nose and crying. She told police that he had struck her and destroyed several of her belongings, and that in recent months, he had begun breaking things and flying into rages, according to the police report. Stawicki's father, Walt Stawicki, described his son as a very private person who was "disgruntled" and had been a frequent customer of the coffee shop where his rampage began.

== Victims ==
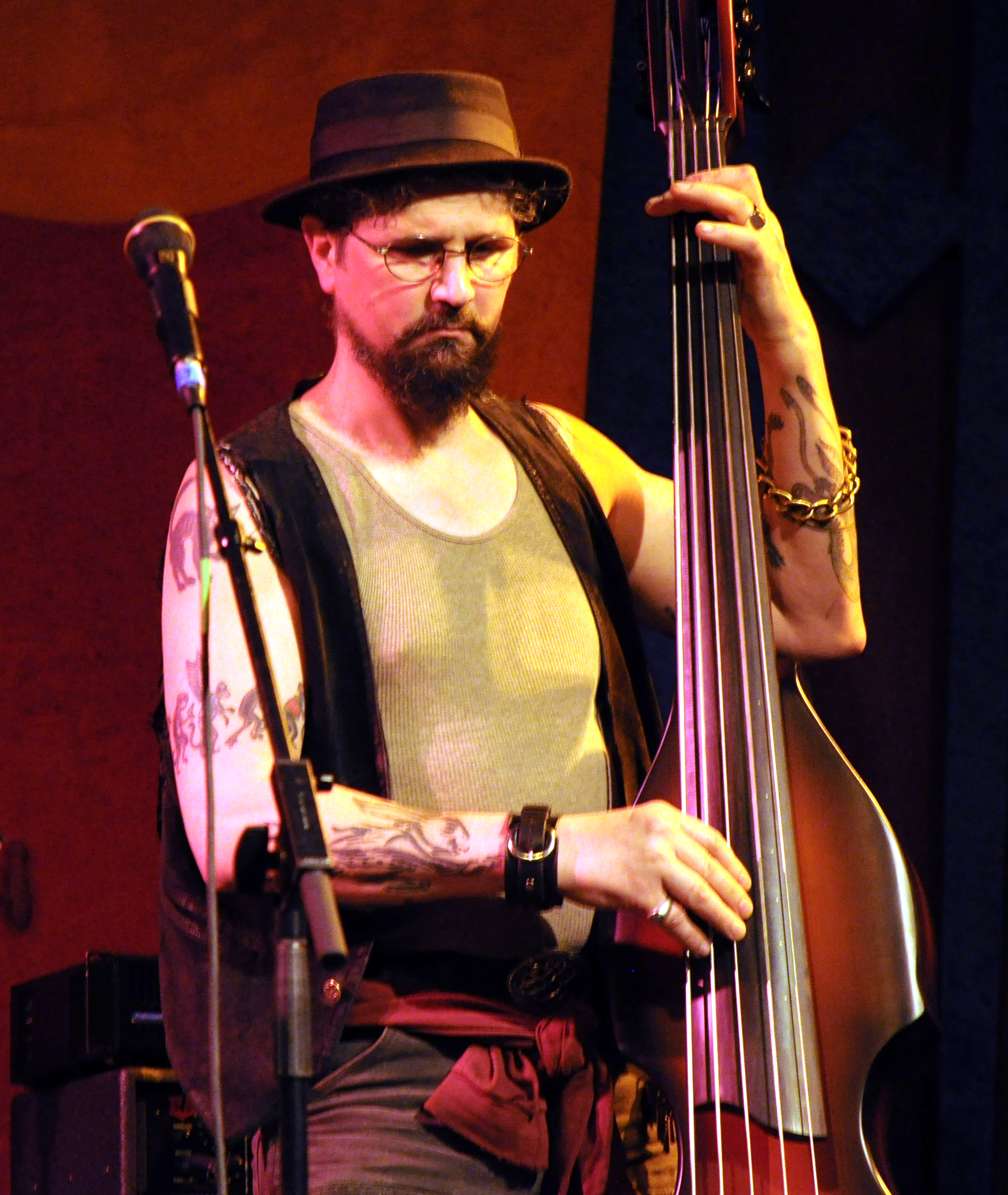
Joseph Albanese

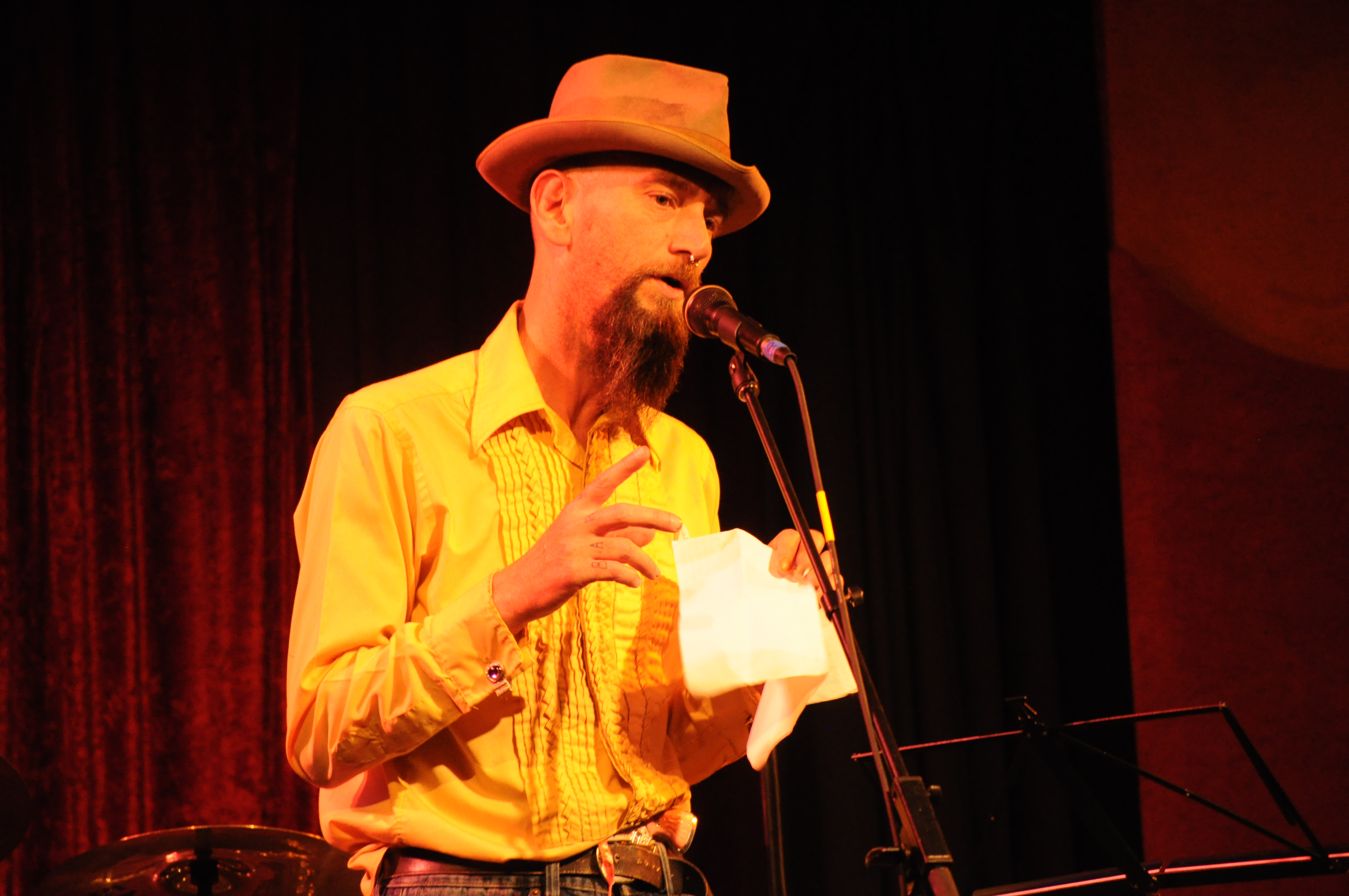
Andrew Keriakedes

Dead

- Joseph "Meshuguna Joe" Albanese (bassist of the band "MIGHTY SPHINCTER" and latterly a key member of Circus Contraption), 52, at Café Racer
- Andrew "Schmootzi the Clod" Keriakedes (also a member of Circus Contraption), 49, at Café Racer
- Kimberly Lynn Layfield, 36, at Café Racer
- Donald Largen, 57, at Café Racer
- Gloria Leonidas, 52, on First Hill

Injured

- Leonard Meuse, 46, at Café Racer

== Aftermath ==
Café Racer had a somewhat rocky history after the incident, opening and closing at least twice over the next eight years, before definitively closing during the COVID-19 pandemic in 2020. In its final closing in August 2020, owner Jeff Ramsey announced that the name would live on as a free online music station featuring "music from Washington and primarily Seattle." In 2021, Café Racer reopened in the Capitol Hill neighborhood. Café Racer closed permanently on June 30, 2024, with the owners promising to shift their focus to nonprofit outreach efforts aimed at promoting growth and opportunities for young artists.

== Trivia ==
The Westboro Baptist Church threatened to protest at one of the victims funerals.

== In the media ==
The shooting is chronicled by Stawicki's father in the Discovery television program Evil Lives Here, the 5th episode of the 5th season entitled "He's Still My Son".

== See also ==
- Columbus nightclub shooting, another mass shooting which killed a musical performer (Dimebag Darrell)
- Crime in Washington (state)
- 2009 Lakewood shooting, another mass shooting at a coffee shop in Washington state
- Capitol Hill massacre, another mass shooting in Seattle
- List of mass shootings in the United States in the 2010s
