= 2024 Florence, Kentucky shooting =

Mass shooting in Kentucky, U.S.

- Location: 38.97175°N 84.68157°W; Florence, Kentucky, U.S.
- Date: July 6, 2024 c. 2:51 a.m. (EDT)
- Attack type: Mass murder; mass shooting; murder-suicide
- Weapon: Handgun
- Deaths: 5 (including the perpetrator)
- Injuries: 3
- Perpetrator: Chase Garvey
- Motive: Disputed

On July 6, 2024, a man opened fire at a birthday party in Florence, Kentucky, United States, killing four people and wounding three others. The gunman, 21-year-old Chase Garvey, fled the scene in a vehicle, leading to a police pursuit that ended when he shot himself and the vehicle crashed into a ditch. The party was for the homeowner's son, who was celebrating his 21st birthday. Garvey is believed to have known several of the victims.

== Shooting ==
A birthday party for 21-year-old Brendon Parrett was being hosted at the home of his mother, 44-year-old Melissa Parrett on Ridgecrest Drive. Chase Garvey, who was not an attendee at the party, arrived at the home and stalked outside for nearly an hour before he opened fire with a firearm, killing four and wounding three.

As the shooting unfolded, the Florence Police Department received calls of an active shooter at the home and responded to the scene. When they arrived, the attack was still ongoing. Garvey managed to escape in a vehicle. Partygoers identified him to responding officers and told them that he had fled and gave them a vehicle description. Those officers relayed the information to other responding officers. Other officers coming into the neighborhood spotted him as he fled near Farmview Drive and Old U.S. 42, and they attempted to pull him over, resulting in a car chase. Florence Police Department and Boone County Sheriff's Office deputies pursued him south down U.S. 42 before Garvey drove off the road and into a ditch south of Union. Officers closed in on him and discovered that he had shot himself. He was transported to St. Elizabeth Florence Hospital where he was pronounced dead. The police later determined that Garvey had shot himself in the head, which caused him to crash.

== Victims ==
Police located two victims outside of the residence and the remaining five inside. Four partygoers were killed, including the party's host Melissa Parrett. Bruce Parrett, the father of Melissa's children, credits her for running downstairs and saving the life of their 19-year-old daughter Chloe, who was also shot in the chest, saying that "she wouldn't be alive if it wasn't for her mom". Delaney Eary, 19, of Burlington, Hayden Rybicki, 20, of Elsmere, and Shane Miller, 20, of Florence, were also killed. Eary's family told reporters that Garvey was her ex-boyfriend. The surviving victims were transported to the University of Cincinnati Medical Center. Parrett's lungs were unable to hold air by themselves after the shooting and she will reportedly never recover to how she was before the attack.

== Perpetrator ==
The Florence Police Department identified the shooter as 21-year-old Chase Garvey (April 2003 – July 6, 2024), a resident of Florence. Garvey was previously charged with rape in the 1st degree and sodomy in the 2nd degree, in relation to the assault of a 13-year-old girl whom he had met on Snapchat when he was 17 years old in 2021. Garvey met the victim in a Fort Mitchell apartment complex parking lot when he was 18-years-old and admitted to raping her in his car.

Garvey was released on home incarceration and had a bond of US$25,000 posted for him, had his charges reduced to unlawful transaction with a minor and five years of probation, and was ordered to participate in psychological counseling. He was barred from owning a firearm due to being a convicted felon and it is not clear how he obtained the firearm he used in the attack. The Kenton County Commonwealth's Attorney, Rob Sanders, said that Garvey's case did not go to trial because the victim's mother did not want her to have to testify, and as a result Garvey received lesser charges.

Garvey was arrested in spring 2023 after a police officer caught him doing doughnuts in the parking lot of a Dave & Buster's in Kenton County with a 13-year-old boy in the passenger seat. He was charged for wanton endangerment and reckless driving and his probation officer requested a judge revoke his probation. That judge sentenced Garvey to 30 days in jail. The police's preliminary investigation indicated that Garvey was not an attendee of the party and came to the party with the sole intention of committing a violent attack on the home's occupants. Police also believe that Garvey knew the people attending the party.

== Aftermath and response ==
During a press conference after the attack, Florence Police Chief Jeff Mallery said, "I know it has gone on throughout the nation, but this is the first time that we've had a mass shooting in Florence, it is very emotional". Police Captain Greg Rehkamp explained that while "we always prepare for these events–mass shooters and mass casualties–this is the only one that's actually taken place in Florence" and "hopefully we'll never see another one again". Boone County Schools announced counseling services were being made available to students and families as some of the victims were connected to the school district. The counseling services were held at Erpenbeck Elementary School.

A makeshift memorial was created outside of the Parrett home after the attack. A vigil was hosted for the victims on July 9 at Crestview Hills Town Center. Florence Mayor Dr. Julie Aubuchon spoke at the vigil saying, "When you have that many young people, it's tragic that you have any young person die, but to have that many, I don't know how to process it to be honest". Longnecks Sports Grill in Hebron, who employ one of the surviving shooting victims, held a fundraiser for the victims of the attack. Six other restaurants in the Boone County area also planned fundraisers for the victims.

Kentucky State Senator John Schickel condemned the attack and decried Garvey being allowed out on probation ahead of the attack and asked how he had once violated his probation yet still managed to obtain a firearm and commit the shooting, saying, "We are not holding people accountable for their actions". The Ion Center for Violence Prevention, a non-profit organization based in Covington, gave condolences after the attack with CEO Christy Burch saying the organization was able and willing to help anyone impacted by the attack.

A foundation was created in honor of victim Hayden Rybicki in the aftermath of the shooting. The Hayden Rybicki Foundation began an annual car show in his honor, as Rybicki was a car enthusiast.

== See also ==
- Capitol Hill massacre, another mass shooting targeting a house party
- Crime in Kentucky
