= Capitol Hill massacre =

2006 mass shooting in Seattle, Washington, US

Coordinates: 47°37′24″N 122°18′15″W

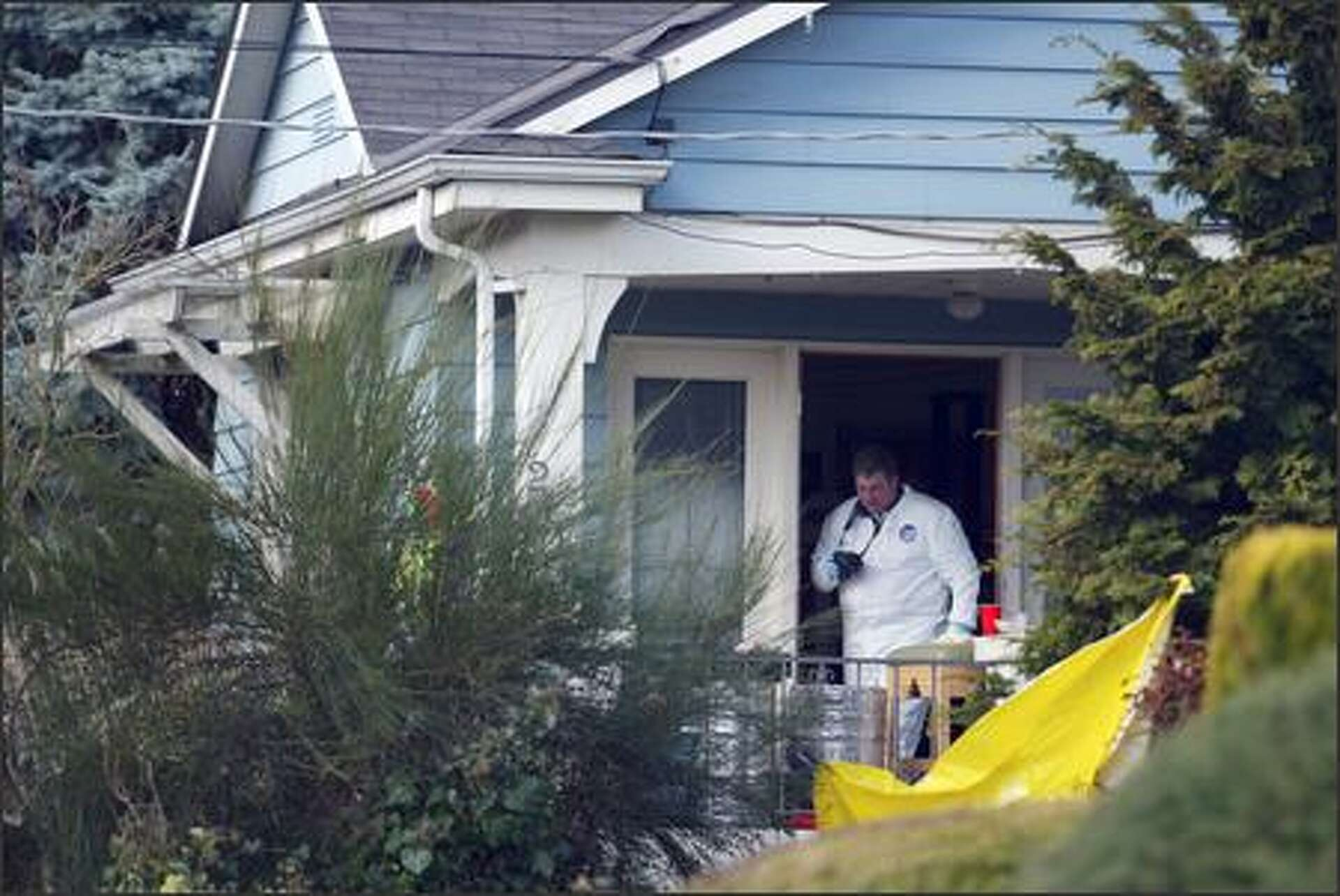
- Location: Seattle, Washington, U.S.
- Date: March 25, 2006; 20 years ago 7:00 a.m. (PST)
- Attack type: Mass shooting; murder-suicide; mass murder
- Weapons: Winchester 1300 Defender 12-gauge pump-action shotgun; Ruger P944 .40 caliber semi-automatic pistol; Bushmaster XM-15-E2S semi-automatic rifle (unused); Handgun (unused); Machete (unused); Baseball bat (unused)
- Deaths: 7 (including the perpetrator)
- Injuries: 2
- Perpetrator: Kyle Aaron Huff
- Motive: Inconclusive

The Capitol Hill massacre was a mass shooting committed by 28-year-old Kyle Aaron Huff in the eastern part of Seattle's Capitol Hill neighborhood. On the morning of March 25, 2006, Huff entered a rave after-party and opened fire, killing six and wounding two. He would then commit suicide as he was being confronted by police on the front porch of 2112 E. Republican Street.

== Timeline ==
=== Prior to the shooting ===
In a panel released by the Seattle Police Department headed by criminologist, James Alan Fox of Northeastern University, it was suggested Huff had been planning the shooting as early as February. He was identified sitting in his truck by employees of Studio Seven studying the patrons coming and going from events at the venue. Upon a review of his internet search history, it was revealed that he frequently searched for upcoming rave events.

On the evening of March 24, 2006, a "Better Off Undead" event was held at the Capitol Hill Arts Center (CHAC), which reported a maximum attendance of 350 throughout the evening. By nearly all accounts, CHAC itself had ample security at the event, with more than 20 security personnel on duty. At the event, Huff was invited to attend an after-party at a private residence about a mile away. Sometime between 4:00 a.m. and 6:00 a.m. on March 25, Huff left the event to attend the after-party. A last-minute invitee, Huff did not personally know anyone at the after-party. He was quiet but spoke pleasantly with everyone as the after-party progressed. Nobody recalled him leaving, and there was no altercation or belligerent behavior exhibited by Huff.

=== Shooting ===
Huff left the house at 7:00 a.m. and returned to his large truck, parked nearby. From the truck, he retrieved a 12-gauge Winchester 1300 Defender pump-action shotgun with a pistol grip and a .40-caliber Ruger P944 semi-automatic handgun, and several bandoliers with more than 300 rounds of ammunition for the guns. On his way back to the after-party, he spray-painted the word "NOW" on the sidewalk and on the steps of a neighboring home. Upon arrival, he shot five victims who were outside talking: two on the steps, the others on the porch. People inside tried to hold the front door of the house shut, but Huff forced his way in through the door and shot three more people on the first floor.

During the shooting, Huff allegedly stated "There's plenty for everyone" or something similar. On the second floor, he fired twice through the locked door of a bathroom where a couple had taken refuge inside the bathtub; neither person was hit. Five victims died at the scene, and three victims who were badly injured during the shooting were taken to Harborview Medical Center, one of whom died there. The shooting inside the house lasted for five minutes, although Huff reportedly stopped shooting people and started wandering the house, walking past numerous people without shooting at them. A patrol officer nearby, Steve Leonard, heard the shots and headed to the scene, getting the address from multiple 911 dispatches. When he got to the house, he encountered an injured victim and immediately got between the victim and the house, as Huff was coming down the steps. Before the officer could complete his demand that Huff drop his weapon, Huff placed the gun in his mouth and shot himself through the head. He fired his shotgun at least 9 times, including his final shot, and he fired his pistol at least 5 times. The shotgun was reloaded twice and the handgun was reloaded once. He continuously chambered rounds during the attack, causing his weapons to eject live rounds across the crime scene.

=== Aftermath ===
Following the shooting, police found that Huff's truck contained a .223-caliber Bushmaster XM-15-E2S semi-automatic rifle, another handgun, several more boxes of ammunition, a baseball bat, and a machete. On the afternoon of March 25, the Seattle Police Department served a search warrant on the North Seattle apartment that Huff shared with his identical twin brother, Kane, where they found more guns and ammunition. During the search, Huff's brother returned home, unaware of what had happened. He was taken into custody, questioned, then later released.

Many who attended the Capitol Hill Arts Center event learned of the shooting the next morning via local "rave" online forums, some of which included first-hand accounts from survivors. On March 28, at the site of the mass murder, the Church Council of Greater Seattle, led by Reverend Sanford Brown and other local clergy, held an interfaith prayer service. The service was attended by more than 500 people. One of the wounded victims underwent numerous surgeries, and it was deemed too dangerous to remove the remaining bullet fragments in his arm.

== Victims ==
Deceased

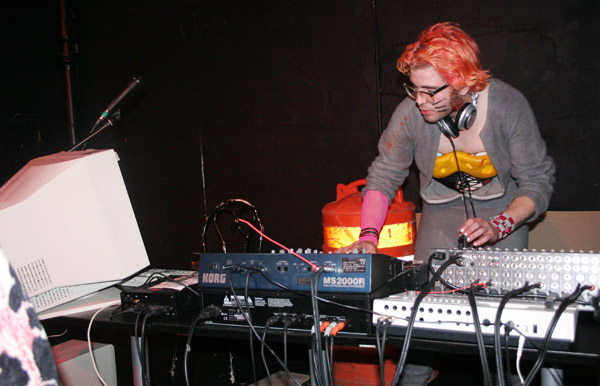
Jeremy Martin, one of the six victims

- Melissa Moore, 14
- Suzanne Thorne, 15
- Justin "Sushi" Schwartz, 22
- Christopher "Deacon 808" Williamson, 21
- Jeremy Martin, 26
- Jason Travers, 32

Injured

- Kian Movasagi, 18
- One unidentified teenager

== Perpetrator ==
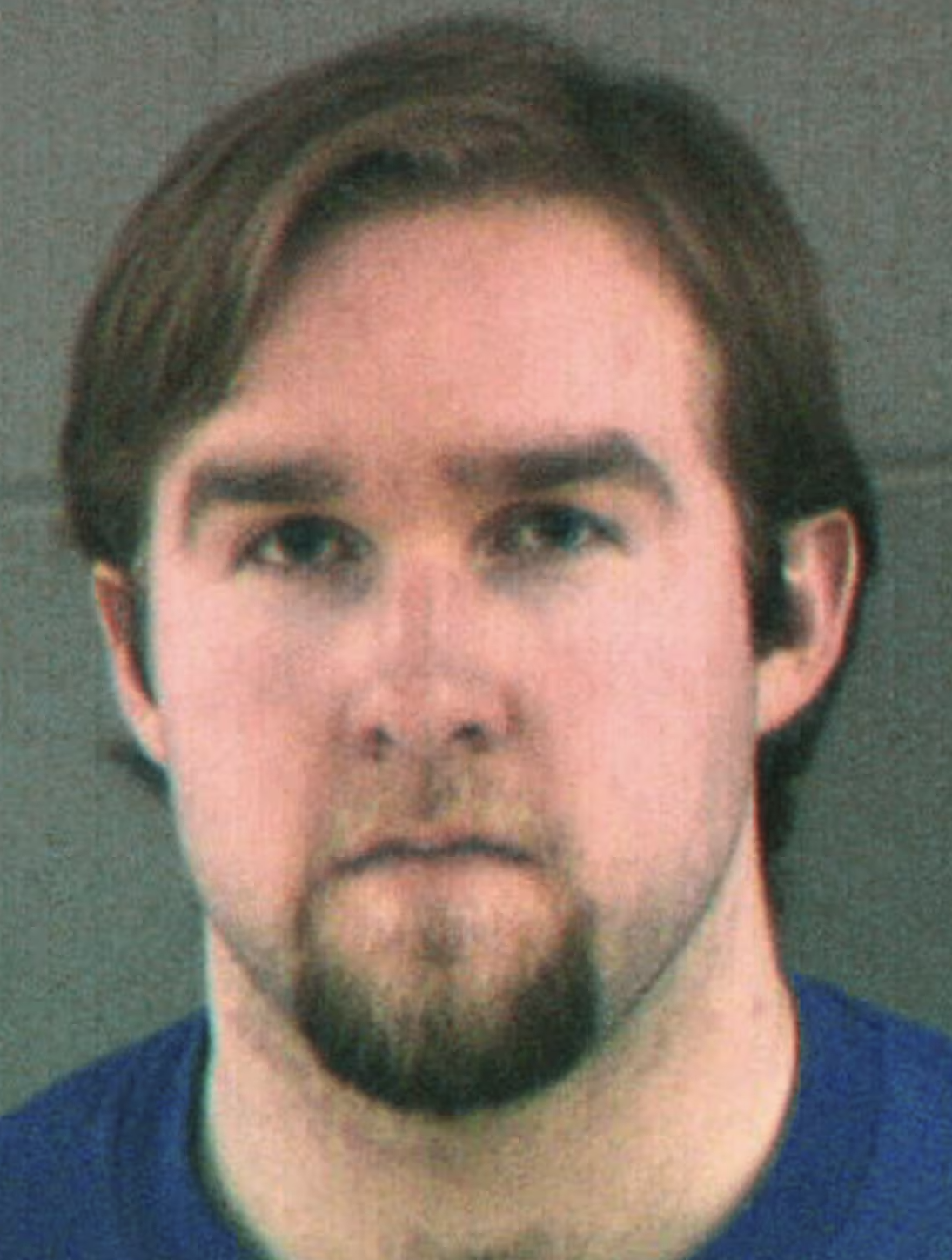
The perpetrator pictured in November 2000.

Kyle Aaron Huff (September 22, 1977 – March 25, 2006) was identified as the shooter in the morning massacre. His motive remains unknown. Huff claimed to have attended The Art Institute of Seattle and North Seattle Community College, although neither institution has records of him attending. Huff's employment history consisted exclusively of pizza delivery jobs. Huff's parents divorced in January 1992 or before. He graduated high school in 1996, where he was voted "least school-spirited".

Huff had previously been arrested in his hometown of Whitefish, Montana back in the summer of 2000, for destroying a public arts project and was charged with a felony. He shot up a statue of a moose that was part of an installation called "Moose on the Loose". He was described by residents there as a well-liked person with a minor history of delinquency. He moved to Seattle with his twin brother about five years before the shooting. He had little contact with police in Seattle, but was involved in a brawl at the Lobo Saloon in 2004.

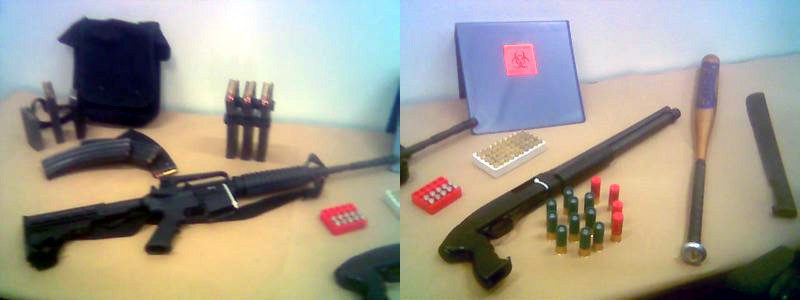
Huff's weapons and ammunition

The weapons used were purchased legally at sporting goods stores in Kalispell, Montana. They were seized by the police in Whitefish after he pleaded guilty to a reduced misdemeanor mischief charge in the moose incident. They were returned after he paid restitution and a fine. The original felony charge for destroying the art would have prohibited him from legally owning firearms.

In 2002, a man in Whitefish, who was high school friends with Huff, killed his own parents before committing suicide. Investigators believe that event may have given Huff a model for his own attack. Huff was not well known in Seattle's rave scene. Very few people in the scene knew him or interacted with him. On February 1, 2006, someone with the email address kylehuff23@hotmail.com asked on an internet message board run by local raver Groovinkim when the next rave was because he'd never been to one. Evidentially, this may not be the perpetrator despite the resemblance of name due to the fact that the same user made a follow-up comment later in April, after the attack and Huff's suicide.

== Motive ==
A possible window into the killer's motives appeared nearly a month after the event. An apartment manager of a complex about a mile from Huff's residence called police about a possible bomb he found while inspecting dumpsters, although that bomb turned out to be just modeling clay and wires. In the investigation afterwards, police found a handwritten note in the dumpster apparently written by Huff. On June 6, the police released the letter, not yet authenticated, to the media. A week later, the Washington State Patrol's Crime Lab concluded that it was "highly probable" that the letter was authentic. Arguments in favor of authenticity included the fact that the letter was written on stationery from the apartment complex where the Huff brothers lived and matched several known samples of the killer's writing, according to crime lab experts. The Stranger, an alternative weekly, earlier claimed that the handwriting on the letter appeared to be identical to samples from a job application of Huff's that the periodical had obtained.

The letter, dated two days before the killings, was specific in expressing the writer's anger at young ravers for their provocative lifestyle, particularly their sexual freedom, and said that the things they did and said were too disturbing for the writer to live with. Quotes from the letter include "I hope that you will find this letter after the fact. Don’t let the police or FBI keep you from haveing (sic) it, this is my last wish”, "Don’t kill yourself moron. That’s the last thing I would want to happen. I hate leaving you by yourself, but this is something I feel I have to do. My life would always feel incomplete otherwise", "They’re packed in there, groping each other, having sex", "I’ve got to do something about it. ... These people are screwing up the world", and "This hippy stuff has to end". It ended with the quote "Now, kids, Now", reminiscent of the letters "NOW" that Huff spray painted during the massacre. Additionally, in the weeks leading up to the massacre, he had attempted to start dating a woman, sending her flowers and calling leaving her messages but she said he was 'not her type'.

== Legacy ==
The Capitol Hill massacre was the worst mass killing in Seattle since the 1983 Wah Mee massacre in which 13 died. While Seattle and the Pacific Northwest in the past half-century have had numerous serial killers—most notoriously Ted Bundy, "Green River Killer" Gary Ridgway, and Robert Lee Yates—mass murder is not as common, although the area has had several of them. In the wake of the killings, The Seattle Times, invoking the drugs and alcohol the victims apparently enjoyed that night, immediately called for tighter regulation of the late-night activities of teenagers and young adults, and for the city's all-ages dance rules to be "thoroughly re-examined and re-tooled". These views were opposed by The Stranger, which published a response to the Times written by Josh Feit, the weekly's news editor, and its editor-in-chief Dan Savage, stating:

Far from endangering kids, teen dances keep kids safe. If the young people hadn't been at a crowded public dance overseen by extensive security (19 guards were at CHAC on Saturday night) where no one got hurt, the kids would likely have been out at unchaperoned and completely unregulated house parties—not after the dance, but all night. And, without a fat calendar of all-ages events, that's where they would be every weekend. Because without organized all-ages dances and live-music events, house parties and parking lots are all kids have.

The views predominating among the city's politicians and other leaders turned out to be closer to those of The Stranger than the Times. As mayor Greg Nickels put it, "This is not about music, this is not about a party. This was about a guy who decided he was going to kill people and he had the firepower to do it." Several city council members spoke up against the "quick fix" mentality inherent in the Times editorial; council member Peter Steinbrueck added he was "really incredulous over young teenaged girls going out all night unsupervised and mixing with much older people", but didn't see that as an issue over the nature of the place where they had socialized. Sandra Williamson, mother of shooting victim Christopher "Deacon" Williamson, announced, "I'm going to do everything in my power to make sure that those raves continue… That is what I am going to do for Chris." The Seattle Post-Intelligencer added that "even ... former City Attorney Mark Sidran", whom they described as "Seattle's best-known defender of underage dance restrictions", said: "Some tragedies defy any sort of rational response in terms of regulation because they're completely irrational events you can't really predict or prevent."

As it happens, the killings occurred only days before Mayor Nickels was to announce the city's support for the non-profit VERA project (which puts on all-ages shows) moving into a new location at Seattle Center, so that at the time of the killings all-ages events were more than routinely on the minds of city leaders, and in a more than typically positive light. Four years earlier, Seattle repealed a rather extreme and limiting Teen Dance Ordinance (TDO), replacing it with the much more flexible All-ages Dance Ordinance (AADO). In the course of the exchanges in the wake of the murders, musician and activist Ben Shroeter wrote that the AADO made possible legitimate, well-run dances, instead of the sometimes very drug-ridden underground events that had illegally occurred in the TDO era. Shroeter wrote, "The dangerous 'underground' rave has virtually disappeared in the Seattle area. I’d rather have my daughter at CHAC or VERA Project than in the beckoning custody of unregulated and lecherous slimeballs."

== In popular culture ==
The 2019 film Wallflower is loosely based around the incident.

== See also ==
- 2012 Seattle café shootings
- 2024 Florence shooting
- List of rampage killers in the United States
