= Peoples National Bank robbery =

1961 bank robbery in Seattle, Washington

The Peoples National Bank burglary took place on February 18–19, 1961, when the safe deposit vault at the Seattle, Washington branch of Peoples National Bank of Washington (now U.S. Bancorp) was broken into and $45,689.53 ($351,668 today) in cash were looted. The perpetrator, unemployed pilot Wells Benner van Steenbergh Jr., was apprehended two weeks later. He received a 20-year prison sentence but was paroled after serving slightly more than a quarter of his sentence.

== Background ==
Wells Benner van Steenbergh Jr was born in Rhinebeck, New York in 1935; the family later moved to Hyde Park. He had served in the U.S. Army and was a member of the Army Reserve.

In 1955, van Steenbergh was studying engineering at Bridgeport college. During that time he was charged with murdering a Rhinebeck woman, 37-year-old Mary Browning Beresford: According to prosecution, she had caught him trying to steal a four-digit sum of money from her home on October 28, 1955, whereupon he killed her and set fire to her home to cover up the crime. The first trial against him ended in a hung jury on June 7, 1956; after a second trial he was acquitted on December 20 of the same year.

Van Steenbergh left his hometown shortly after the trial and moved to Seattle, Washington, in 1958 or 1959. He found seasonal work as a pilot for a small airline there, and met his wife Mary Sue (*ca. 1939), whom he married in December 1959. She became pregnant in mid-1960 and would later give birth to a daughter, while van Steenbergh was awaiting trial. As of late 1960, van Steenbergh was unemployed.

== Robbery ==
As van Steenbergh would later confess, “In the early part of October, 1960, I felt the need to get more money for my family because I felt that they deserved more than they were getting from me.” He considered three banks and eventually chose as his target the suburban South Seattle branch of Peoples National Bank of Washington, where he had an account and knew the location of the vault. Its neighborhood consisted mostly of small businesses and single-family homes, and was virtually deserted after dark. The bank was adjacent to an undeveloped plot of land, separated from the bank building only by an earth embankment and the alley leading to the bank's drive-through counter. Van Steenbergh decided to dig a tunnel into the bank from that plot of land, underneath the embankment and to the foundations of the bank building, from where he hoped he to gain access to the vault.

Van Steenbergh, who had no experience in excavations, began digging, but the tunnel caved in soon. He made a second attempt, this time carefully shoring the tunnel with timbers. He would work during the night and camouflage the tunnel entrance with scattered twigs during the day. By van Steenbergh's accounts, his wife was unaware of what he was doing, and he would always provide a cover-up story for his absences.

By late October van Steenbergh had reached the opposite side of the alley and began to slope his tunnel upwards. 18 feet (6 m) into the tunnel, he reached a crawl space under the bank building. From there he managed to get into the bank's cellar and just underneath the vault. He estimated the vault floor to be about 20 inches (50 cm) thick.

In order to break through the vault floor, van Steenbergh first tried a hammer and chisel, but quickly realized he would need stronger tools. He then inquired about suitable tools at a tool rental shop and was shown a rotary hammer. He broke into the shop the same night and stole the tools he needed. However, the power tool turned out to be so noisy that van Steenbergh feared it might alert others to his actions, and temporarily abandoned his plans over Christmas. In early January he decided to blast a hole in the vault floor, bought dynamite under an assumed name and studied explosives at the Seattle library. In mid-February he began to drill holes in the vault floor and ignited his first round of dynamite, which removed only some five inches (12 cm) of concrete.

Van Steenbergh's actions did not go entirely unnoticed: employees noticed dust and plaster falling from the ceilings and cracks in the walls. Experts were consulted, who suspected an industrial paper cutter on the third floor of being responsible for the damage; some also attributed it to the building's location near the Boeing plant, which meant aircraft were frequently flying over the building at low altitudes. No actions were taken.

In the late evening hours of Friday, February 17, van Steenbergh ignited the final round of dynamite. Fearing that the blast might have set off an alarm in the bank, he fled the site to return on the following afternoon and ensure nobody appeared to have grown suspicious. The blast had indeed been heard by two local residents, who had thought it to be the sonic boom of a fighter jet. Van Steenbergh entered the building through his tunnel on Saturday night and found he had blasted a 14 by 16 inch (35 by 40 cm) hole into the vault floor, just in the center so it had not set off the burglar alarm and had also missed heavy steel reinforcing bars. Authorities believed van Steenbergh had used magnetic locators to determine the best location, which he denied, stating he had been “just lucky”. Van Steenbergh looted $45,689.53 in bank notes and coins, of a total of $150,000 kept in the vault. He returned to the scene again on Sunday night to cover up his tracks. The burglary was not discovered until the first bank employees arrived on Monday, February 20.

== Investigation and arrest ==
Authorities initially believed the burglary had been committed by several skilled criminals. While an intensive investigation was underway, van Steenbergh started spending the stolen money almost instantly. He opened an account with a different bank in Seattle and made mortgage payments on his house, a $1,000 down payment in cash on a used station wagon, as well as payments for a freezer and a sewing machine. Some of the bills were eventually matched to the burglary.

Van Steenbergh was arrested by the FBI at his home on March 3. He had $160 in his possession, in bills whose serial numbers matched those stolen in the burglary. He was charged with possessing stolen money and jailed on a $50,000 bail.

A merchant testified that van Steenbergh had bought drilling tools and shovels from him shortly before the burglary. $32,786.28 was found in a locker checked out to van Steenbergh at Ft. Lawton, Seattle, on March 5. Another $6,657.24 was found in a wooded area near Renton, southeast of Seattle, on the same day.

== Trial ==
After initially pleading not guilty, van Steenbergh changed his plea to guilty on March 30, after the prosecution outlined how van Steenbergh had plotted and carried out the burglary. He was sentenced to 20 years in prison on the same day, due to become eligible for parole after 7 years. However, the judge stated he would consider a reduction of the sentence after receiving a probation report. Van Steenbergh's parole eligibility was reduced to 3 years on June 15, 1961, while the maximum penalty of 20 years was upheld, and he was released on parole on June 22, 1966.
