= 2015 Tyrone, Missouri, shootings =

Spree shooting in Missouri, U.S.

- Location: Tyrone, Missouri, U.S.
- Date: February 26, 2015
- Attack type: Mass shooting, mass murder, murder-suicide, spree shooting
- Weapons: .45 caliber Rock Island Armory 1911 handgun; .22 caliber semi-automatic rifle (unused); .22 caliber semi-automatic pistol (unused)
- Deaths: 8 (including the perpetrator)
- Injuries: 1
- Perpetrator: Joseph Jesse Aldridge

On February 26, 2015, a gunman shot and killed seven people in several locations across the town of Tyrone, an unincorporated community approximately 95 miles east of Springfield, Missouri, United States. The gunman, identified as 36-year-old Joseph Jesse Aldridge, was found dead of a self-inflicted gunshot wound the next day. It was the worst mass murder in the history of Texas County, which previously had experienced an average of one homicide per year.

== Shootings ==
Police were alerted to the shootings at 10:15 p.m. CT Thursday, when a 15-year-old girl ran to a neighbor's home to say she heard gunshots in her home and fled. Deputies responded and found her parents, Garold and Julie Aldridge, dead inside the home. A 1/4 mile away, officers found Garold's brother Harold and his wife Janell shot to death inside their bedroom. As a result, police began checking all of the houses in Tyrone, urging citizens to stay inside their residences and lock their doors.

Less than three miles away, Darrell and Martha Shriver were both shot in their home. While Darrell died from his wounds, Martha survived and managed to identify the suspect as Joseph Jesse Aldridge as she was being taken to a hospital in Springfield. She also had a relative check on the well-being of her son Carey and his family. The relative found Carey and his wife Valirea dead on the floor of their bedroom, and their son sleeping unharmed in another bedroom. The entire shooting spree occurred within a three-mile radius of Tyrone. All of the crime scenes showed no signs of forced entry into the homes.

An elderly woman connected to the shootings died from natural causes. Authorities believe the gunman started the shooting spree after finding his mother, the aforementioned elderly woman, dead on a couch from an illness for which she had been under a doctor's care, though this was unconfirmed. The disease was clarified in an autopsy to be metastatic lung cancer, although according to the woman's brother, it was breast cancer. A relative feared the woman did not die from the disease, and had instead been smothered to death by Aldridge. The woman was identified as 74-year-old Alice L. Aldridge.

At around 5:30 a.m. on February 27, the gunman was found dead inside a pickup truck situated in the middle of a two-lane highway. He was southeast of Summersville in neighboring Shannon County, located about fifteen or twenty miles away from the scenes of the shootings. He died of a self-inflicted gunshot wound earlier that day. A Rock Island Armory 1911 .45-caliber handgun, believed to be the same one used in the shootings, was recovered from the truck along with a stash of ammunition. The shootings were the worst mass murder in the history of Texas County, Missouri, which had an average of one homicide per year.

== Perpetrator and victims ==
=== Perpetrator ===
Joseph Jesse Aldridge (May 23, 1978 – February 27, 2015) was identified as the gunman in the shootings. He was a cousin of the named male victims. On June 15, 2007, Aldridge was arrested in Howell County for felony marijuana possession, during which he was found to have a Ruger 22/45 .22-caliber pistol in his possession. On May 2, 2008, he was sentenced to 21 months in a federal prison for owning the pistol. He was released three years later, though a judge added six months of his arrest to his sentence in 2011 at the request of Aldridge's probation officer. He was also ordered to undergo mental health and substance abuse counseling. Aldridge was known to local law enforcement, although his criminal history was described as minor. His record at the time of the shooting barred him from owning guns.

Aldridge was described as a recluse by relatives. Arkansas Democrat-Gazette reported that he was involved in a feud with a cousin, who was one of the victims in the shootings, and that Aldridge and several other members of his extended family were having tense relations between one another following a fistfight involving Aldridge's brother. According to a relative of the Shriver family and other residents of Tyrone, Aldridge had asked Darrell Shriver, one of the slain victims and a neighbor of his, for a job at a cabinet store he owned prior to the shootings, but was turned down. He had also reportedly threatened to kill other residents.

=== Victims ===
All of the victims in the shooting were adults. In the hours after the shootings, four of the seven casualties were identified by police, while the others were identified by relatives and friends before being confirmed by police. They are:

Name	Age	Relationship
Garold Dee Aldridge	52	Joseph Aldridge's cousin
Julie Ann Aldridge	47	Garold Aldridge's wife
Harold Wayne Aldridge	50	Garold Aldridge's brother Joseph Aldridge's cousin
Janell Arlisa Aldridge	48	Harold Aldridge's wife
Darrell Dean Shriver	68	Joseph Aldridge's neighbor
Martha Shriver	67	Darrell Shriver's wife Survived her gunshot wounds
Carey Dean Shriver	46	Darrell and Martha Shriver's son Joseph Aldridge's neighbor
Valirea Love Shriver	44	Carey Shriver's wife

Martha Shriver, the sole survivor, had been shot three times, first in the hand and arm, and then in the back while trying to escape, which caused her to permanently lose usage of her left leg.

== Reactions ==
Missouri Governor Jay Nixon made a statement on the shootings, saying, "This is a horrific tragedy, and our hearts go out to the victims of these senseless acts and their families." He added that crisis counseling will be made available to Tyrone citizens. Houston Mayor Don Tottingham also said, "This is a terrible tragedy in a community that's real close-knit. This is a great town, and this is why it's such a tragedy because it shows you're vulnerable to things."
