= Penske office shooting =

2010 mass shooting in Georgia, U.S.

- Kennesaw (Georgia)
- Location: 34.0264°N 84.5764°W; Kennesaw, Georgia, United States
- Date: January 12, 2010; 2:00 p.m. (UTC-5)
- Attack type: Mass shooting
- Weapon: 9mm handgun
- Deaths: 4 (including one who died in 2013)
- Injuries: 1
- Perpetrator: Jesse James Warren
- Motive: Revenge
- Charges: 3 counts each of malice murder, felony murder, and aggravated assault; 2 counts of aggravated battery; 5 counts of possession of a firearm during the commission of a crime
- Verdict: Incompetent to stand trial
- Sentence: Indefinitely committed to a mental institution

On January 12, 2010, three people were killed and two others critically injured in a shooting at a Penske truck rental business in the city of Kennesaw, Georgia, United States. One of the injured victims died in 2013 from complications of his injuries. The shooter, Jesse James Warren, was arrested after the incident. Warren was indefinitely committed to a psychiatric facility in 2017.

== Shooting ==
The shooter, Jesse James Warren, a 60-year-old former employee, walked into the Penske truck rental business Tuesday afternoon wearing camouflage. He opened fire with a 9mm handgun, shooting five, shooting at least three of the victims in the head. Four victims were employees, another was a customer. One victim died at the scene. The other four victims were transported in critical condition to WellStar Kennestone Hospital. Another victim died at the hospital the same day. Roberto Gonzalez, an employee, died the next day. Joshua Holbrook and Zachariah Werner were shot multiple times, but initially survived, though they were both paralyzed. Warren was arrested less than a mile away after he left in a red Chevrolet S-10 truck. The police found ammo and two firearms on Warren when he was arrested, and additional ammo and more than 10 firearms in his home. The victims killed at the scene were: Van Springer, 59, Jaider Marulanda, 43, and Roberto Gonzalez, 31.

== Perpetrator ==
Jesse James Warren, who worked as a truck mechanic at the facility from June 2005 to July 2009, had been fired the prior July, leading to financial difficulties. Warren had threatened other employees after his firing, and complained that he had lost his job to Hispanics. A former coworker described Warren as unsociable and unable to focus on his work.

Warren had delusional beliefs, including that the Penske corporation had stolen US$500 million from him, which he believed the US military had given him for inventing Wi-Fi. He also believed that churches and religion were trying to kill him, and had delusions that he was the Son of God and that his thoughts were being broadcast. Prior to the shooting, Van Springer, one of the men killed, described Warren to his wife as having "some issues".

Penske sent Warren to a psychiatrist in 2009 after he told a coworker that Penske had stolen money from him and that the company was involved in computer hacking. Warren was diagnosed with paranoid schizophrenia. Penske allowed him to return to work after he visited the psychiatrist, but eventually fired him.

Warren faced 16 charges, including three counts each of malice murder, felony murder, aggravated assault, two counts of aggravated battery, and five counts of possession of a firearm during the commission of a crime. He pleaded not guilty and was denied bond. The trial was scheduled to begin May 27, 2013, but was postponed so Warren's mental competency could be determined. Prosecutors sought the death penalty.

Warren refused to take anti-psychotic medication, believing his defense attorneys and doctors were working against him. A doctor described him as seeing nonexistent threats and said he could become violent without a hospital setting. The court ordered in 2014 for Warren to be forcibly medicated, but this ruling was overturned by the Georgia Supreme Court due to the fact that the judge did not adequately cite reasons to medicate Warren, given the health dangers anti-psychotic medications posed due to his age and physical condition. The justices stated Warren could be forcibly medicated in the future if his medical circumstances changed. Warren was declared incompetent to stand trial, and was indefinitely committed to a mental institution in 2017.

== Reaction ==
Zachariah Werner, who was paralyzed in the shooting with a bullet lodged in his brain stem, filed a $20 million lawsuit against businesses related to the Penske facility, and Warren, in 2011. The suit alleged that the Penske Corporation had been warned on several occasions that Warren had plans to harm other employees, but failed to provide adequate security. Holbrook, the other survivor of the shooting, also filed a lawsuit. The widow of another victim filed a separate lawsuit seeking unspecified damages, claiming that the company knew Warren had been making death threats. Werner later died from his injuries on July 7, 2013, aged 39.

The Penske facility planned to reopen with limited services the following Friday, and to be fully operational by Monday.
