= Tyrone, Missouri =

Unincorporated community in southern Texas County

Coordinates: 37°12′12″N 91°52′36″W

Tyrone is an unincorporated community in southern Texas County, Missouri, United States. The community is located on Missouri Route H, approximately 1.5 miles west of Missouri Route 137. It consists of several houses.

== History ==
A post office called Tyrone was established in 1891, and remained in operation until 1962. The community was named after Tyrone, Pennsylvania, the native home of a first settler.

On February 27, 2015, Tyrone was the scene of a spree shooting, carried out by Joseph Jesse Aldridge. He killed seven people and wounded another person before taking his own life.

== Notable person ==
Kenneth Lay - Founder, CEO and chairman of Enron Corporation
