= Art All Night shooting =

2018 mass shooting in New Jersey, U.S.

- Location: 40.20975°N 74.75252°W; Trenton, New Jersey, United States
- Date: June 17, 2018; 02:45 am
- Attack type: Mass shooting, shootout
- Weapon: Handguns
- Deaths: 1 (one of the gunmen)
- Injuries: 22 (17 by gunfire, including two gunmen)

Nearly 1,000 people were at the Art All Night event located at Roebling Wire Works Building, in Trenton, New Jersey, on June 17, 2018, when multiple people began to shoot at one another, with one individual killed and 22 injured.

== Incident ==
Two men opened fire around 2:45 am during the 24-hour arts and music festival that showcased local art, music, food and films, which had about 1,000 people in attendance, with about 5,000 to 10,000 people inside and outside the venue, and in the parking lots. Mercer County Prosecutor, told reporters that a 33-year-old suspect was killed and a second suspect was in custody however some sources have referenced a third shooter.

For those who were at the event, many described mistaking the gunfire as fireworks initially, before realizing that many of the other attendees were fleeing the location.

The curator of the event described the chaos that occurred after the shooting stopped when he emerged from his shelter; "About 20 feet on my left there was somebody who was shot in the leg, but on my right, about another 25 feet, was somebody who was shot in the head...Everybody was running...The gallery was full of blood – just trails of blood. Blood splatter all over."

=== Victims ===
Of the injured, 18 were treated at Capital Health System; 15 of which were gunshot wounds, 2 were treated at St. Francis Medical Center, and 1 was transferred to Cooper Health.

== Investigation ==
The Mercer County Prosecutors Office Homicide Task Force, took lead on the investigation as the incident involved officers who discharged their weapons.

=== Suspects ===
Amir Armstrong (23 years old) was wounded by the gunfire during the incident, and was moved from a medical facility to the Mercer County jail, and charged with firearms-related offenses. Another wounded suspect named Davone White (26 years old) was charged with the same offenses.

Tahaij Wells (32 years old) was shot and killed by police during the incident, while officers exchanged gun fire with him and two other suspects. Four months earlier, He had been released from prison after serving 14 years for shooting and killing Robert McNair in 2002. Wells, who was 17 at the time of the offense, was sentenced to 18 years in 2004 following a guilty plea to manslaughter. He had spent most of that time in solitary confinement because other gangsters wanted him dead for the killing.

In June 2019, Armstrong pleaded guilty to second-degree unlawful possession of a handgun with no carry permit. That same month White also pleaded guilty to unlawful use of a firearm. Armstrong was sentenced to five years in prison the following month. In September, White was sentenced to six years, but will be eligible for parole after three and a half years of his sentence.
