= 2017 Freeman High School shooting =

Mass shooting in Washington, U.S.

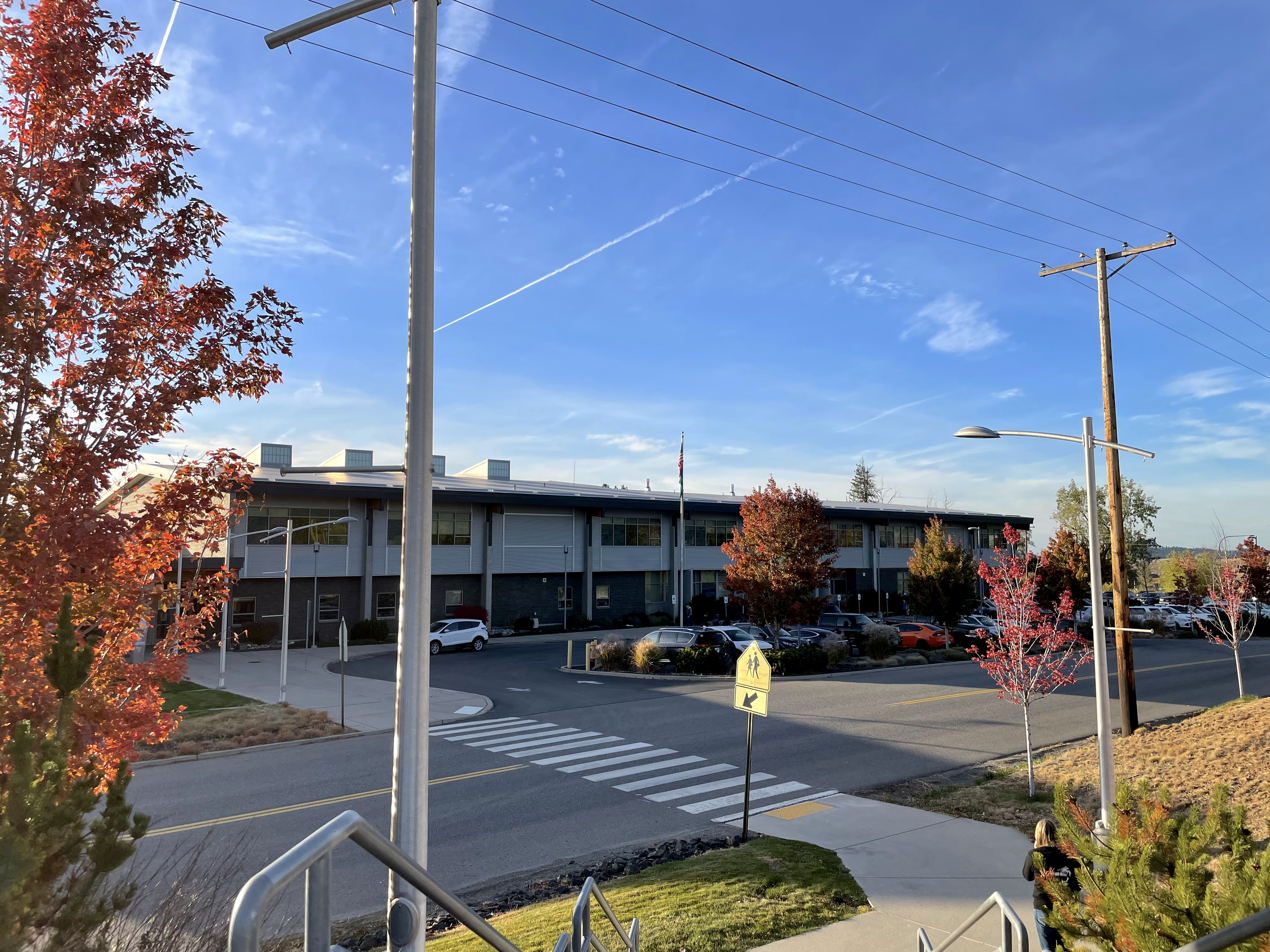
- Freeman High School in 2021
- Location: 47.5200°N 117.1963°W; Freeman High School; Rockford, Washington, U.S.
- Date: September 13, 2017 c. 10:00 a.m. (PDT)
- Target: Students and staff
- Attack type: School shooting, mass shooting
- Weapons: CORE 15 CXV AR-15 style semi-automatic rifle (not used); .32 ACP Colt Model 1903 pistol
- Deaths: 1
- Injuries: 3
- Perpetrator: Caleb Sharpe
- Defender: Joe Bowen
- Motive: Bullying
- Charges: Multiple counts including aggravated murder and attempted murder
- Convictions: Pleaded guilty; sentenced to prison

On September 13, 2017, a mass shooting occurred at Freeman High School in Rockford, Washington, United States. The perpetrator, 15-year-old student Caleb Sharpe, opened fire inside the school, killing one student and injuring three others before being subdued by a school employee. The incident prompted a lockdown of the school and a large law enforcement response.

== Shooting ==
The shooting occurred at approximately 10:00 a.m. local time as students were changing classes between periods. The suspect carried a duffel bag containing an AR-15–style rifle and ammunition into a school hallway. The rifle reportedly suffered a malfunction while the suspect attempted to load a bullet into the chamber. The suspect then pulled a handgun out of his coat and fired into the hallway, striking several students. A school custodian Joe Bowen intervened by confronting the shooter and forcing him to drop his weapon, effectively ending the attack.

One student, identified as Sam Strahan, later died from his injuries, while three others were hospitalized with gunshot wounds. The school was placed on lockdown and later evacuated as police secured the campus.

== Perpetrator ==
The shooter was identified as Caleb Sharpe (born October 10, 2001), a 15-year-old student at the school. According to court documents, Sharpe brought an AR-15–style rifle and a handgun onto campus, though only the pistol was fired during the attack.

Investigators stated that Sharpe had experienced bullying and social isolation, which were cited as contributing factors to the shooting, though no single motive was officially established.

Sharpe had an extensive online activity prior to the shooting, including a YouTube channel. A video uploaded by Sharpe in June 2017 showed him and a friend simulating a shootout. A friend of Sharpe claimed that he was "weird" and was obsessed with documentaries surrounding school shootings and the show Breaking Bad.

=== Legal proceedings ===
Sharpe was charged with aggravated murder, attempted murder, and multiple counts of assault with a firearm. In 2018, a judge ruled that he would be tried as an adult under Washington law due to the seriousness of the crimes.

In 2023, Sharpe pleaded guilty to multiple charges, avoiding a jury trial. He was sentenced to a prison term of 40 years, with the possibility of parole after serving the mandatory minimum required by state law. This sentence was later changed to a mandatory life sentence with the possibility of parole after 25 years.

== Aftermath ==
Following the shooting, the Freeman School District canceled classes and provided counseling and mental health services to students, staff, and families affected by the incident. Vigils and memorial gatherings were held in the local community to honor the victim and support those injured.

The actions of the school custodian who intervened were widely praised by law enforcement officials and community leaders, who credited him with preventing further loss of life. The shooting renewed national discussions regarding school safety, Depression in childhood and adolescence, and gun violence in the United States.

== See also ==
- List of school shootings in the United States
- School shootings in the United States
- Gun violence in the United States
- School violence
