= 2016 Kansas–Missouri murder spree =

Spree shooting in Kansas and Missouri, U.S.

Between March 7 and March 8, 2016, Pablo Serrano-Vitorino killed five men in two shootings across Kansas City, Kansas, and Montgomery County, Missouri, in the United States. The first shooting, which took place in Kansas City, killed four men, and the second shooting, which took place across state lines in unincorporated Montgomery County, killed another man.

== Shootings ==
On the night of March 7, 2016, four men were shot to death with a AK-47-style rifle in Kansas City, Kansas. One of them managed to call police about the shooting before dying. On the morning of March 8, 49-year-old Randy J. Nordman was shot to death in Montgomery County, Missouri, 170 mi (270 km) east of the site of the first shooting. A truck believed to have been driven by the suspect was found five miles away along Interstate 70, and a massive manhunt for him was launched. Two police helicopters and at least one SWAT team were involved in the search.

== Arrest and legal proceedings ==
On March 9, police in New Florence, Missouri, responded to reports of a man pulling a firearm on a civilian at a gas station. At 12:18 a.m., suspect Pablo Antonio Serrano-Vitorino, 40, who lived next door to the four initial victims, was found at a muddy hill alongside Interstate 70 and arrested by Missouri State Highway Patrol Sergeants Primm and McGinnis. No shots were fired despite him being armed. He was armed with a Kalashnikov rifle at the time of his arrest. He was charged with four counts of first-degree murder in Kansas and was jailed in Montgomery County, Missouri, with bail set at $2 million. The day following the arrest, he attempted suicide by cutting himself with a safety razor. He was admitted to a local hospital and was classified to be in stable condition.

On June 1, Serrano-Vitorino pleaded not guilty to the Missouri killing. The death penalty was sought in that case. In September, his Missouri case was transferred by a Montgomery County judge to St. Louis, Missouri for trial. He had previously been sentenced to two years in a California prison for making a terrorist threat and, since he was a Mexican national, had subsequently been deported from the U.S. in April 2004, but had reentered illegally again at an unspecified time. Despite further run-ins with the law, including a batter conviction the previous summer, he managed to avoid deportation.

On April 9, 2019, Serrano-Vitorino was found alone and unresponsive in his cell, having hanged himself. He was taken to a hospital where he later was pronounced dead.

== Victims ==
Kansas:

- Jeremy Waters, 36
- Michael Capps, 41
- Clint Harter, 27
- Austin Harter, 29

Missouri:

- Randy Nordman, 49
