= List of murdered American children =

This is a list of murdered American children that details notable murders among thousands of cases of subjects who were or are believed to have been under the age of 18 upon their deaths. Cases listed are stated to be unsolved or solved. This list is inclusive only of subjects who have an existing article on the English-language Wikipedia. Note that this list does not include deaths where there is an on-going investigation without a conviction due to Wikipedia's policy at WP:BLPCRIME. For this reason pending cases are typically not included in this list, and unsolved cases are only included when there is no living suspect.

== 20th century ==
=== Before 1920 ===
Victim(s)	Date of death	Age	Location	Status	Description
Lemuel Earll	c. February 14, 1902	11	Welsh, Louisiana	Solved	Victims of the Earll family murders. Perpetrator was tried and hanged.
Fay Earll	c. February 14, 1902	15	Welsh, Louisiana	Solved	Victims of the Earll family murders. Perpetrator was tried and hanged.
Fannie Whitten	September 19, 1902	11	Dexter, Maine	Solved	Poisoned by her mother.
Jennie Whitten	November 27, 1902	9	Dexter, Maine	Solved	Poisoned by her mother.
Roy C. Davis	August 13, 1903	15	Winfield, Kansas	Solved	Youngest victim of the Winfield massacre.
Asia Markham	September 30, 1905	0 (4 months)	Cambridge, Illinois	Solved	Murdered by their mother.
Eliza Markham	September 30, 1905	15 months	Cambridge, Illinois	Solved	Murdered by their mother.
Lucy Markham	September 30, 1905	3	Cambridge, Illinois	Solved	Murdered by their mother.
Mary Markham	September 30, 1905	4	Cambridge, Illinois	Solved	Murdered by their mother.
Charles Markham	September 30, 1905	6	Cambridge, Illinois	Solved	Murdered by their mother.
Henry Markham	September 30, 1905	7	Cambridge, Illinois	Solved	Murdered by their mother.
Clara Markham	September 30, 1905	8	Cambridge, Illinois	Solved	Murdered by their mother.
Joachim Andrus	February 24, 1911	3	Lafayette, Louisiana	Solved	Victims of a serial killer.
Agnes Andrus	February 24, 1911	0 (11 months)	Lafayette, Louisiana	Solved	Victims of a serial killer.
Elsie Paroubek	c. April 8, 1911	4	Chicago, Illinois	Unsolved	Murdered and dumped into a drainage canal.
Paul Vernon	June 9–10, 1912	5	Villisca, Iowa	Unsolved	Family and two guests bludgeoned to death.
Arthur Boyd	June 9–10, 1912	7	Villisca, Iowa	Unsolved	Family and two guests bludgeoned to death.
Mary Katherine	June 9–10, 1912	10	Villisca, Iowa	Unsolved	Family and two guests bludgeoned to death.
Herman Montgomery	June 9–10, 1912	11	Villisca, Iowa	Unsolved	Family and two guests bludgeoned to death.
Ina May	June 9–10, 1912	8	Villisca, Iowa	Unsolved	Family and two guests bludgeoned to death.
Lena Stilinger	June 9–10, 1912	11	Villisca, Iowa	Unsolved	Family and two guests bludgeoned to death.
Philip Rintoul	June 9, 1911	8	Ardenwald, Oregon	Unsolved	Murdered along with their parents. Considered one of Oregon's most brutal mass murders.
Dorothy Rintoul	June 9, 1911	5	Ardenwald, Oregon	Unsolved	Murdered along with their parents. Considered one of Oregon's most brutal mass murders.

=== 1920s ===
Victim(s)	Date of death	Age	Location	Status	Description
Geneva Hardman	c. February 4, 1920	10	Lexington, Kentucky	Solved	Victim of serial killer Will Lockett.
Martha Wolf	April 22, 1920	3	Turtle Lake, North Dakota	Solved	Killed by their neighbor Henry Layer.
Liddia Wolf	April 22, 1920	5	Turtle Lake, North Dakota	Solved	Killed by their neighbor Henry Layer.
Edna Wolf	April 22, 1920	7	Turtle Lake, North Dakota	Solved	Killed by their neighbor Henry Layer.
Maria Wolf	April 22, 1920	9	Turtle Lake, North Dakota	Solved	Killed by their neighbor Henry Layer.
Bertha Wolf	April 22, 1920	12	Turtle Lake, North Dakota	Solved	Killed by their neighbor Henry Layer.
Jacob Holfer	April 22, 1920	13	Turtle Lake, North Dakota	Solved	Killed by their neighbor Henry Layer.
Robert Neal Osborn	July 21, 1920	4	Kinston, North Carolina	Solved	Murdered by serial killer Asbury Respus.
Little Lord Fauntleroy	1920 or 1921	5–7	Waukesha, Wisconsin	Unsolved, unidentified	Found dead in a quarry.
Bobby Franks	May 21, 1924	14	Chicago, Illinois	Solved	The two perpetrators confessed soon after the murder.
Richard Russell	June 4, 1925	0 (4 months)	Hamilton, Ohio	Solved	Killed by their uncle.
Paul Russell	June 4, 1925	3	Hamilton, Ohio	Solved	Killed by their uncle.
Robert Russell	June 4, 1925	8	Hamilton, Ohio	Solved	Killed by their uncle.
George Francis Russell	June 4, 1925	8	Hamilton, Ohio	Solved	Killed by their uncle.
Julia Russell	June 4, 1925	12	Hamilton, Ohio	Solved	Killed by their uncle.
Arthur Schumacher	July 1925	8	Wauwatosa, Wisconsin	Unsolved	Went missing on July 24, 1925. His body was found 3 weeks later.
Bath School disaster	May 18, 1927	7–14	Bath Charter Township, Michigan	Solved	Perpetrator set off two explosions that killed 38 children. Perpetrator died in the second explosion.
Frank Wong	August 22, 1928	0 (10–11 days old)	Fairfield, California	Solved	Victims of the 1928 Fairfield murders.
Willie Wong	August 22, 1928	3	Fairfield, California	Solved	Victims of the 1928 Fairfield murders.
Johnnie Wong	August 22, 1928	4	Fairfield, California	Solved	Victims of the 1928 Fairfield murders.
Nellie Wong	August 22, 1928	15	Fairfield, California	Solved	Victims of the 1928 Fairfield murders.
Thomas Shoaf	May 23, 1929	2	Lebanon, Kentucky	Solved	Murdered by their mother.
Ira Shoaf	May 23, 1929	7	Lebanon, Kentucky	Solved	Murdered by their mother.
Catherine Shoaf	May 23, 1929	11	Lebanon, Kentucky	Solved	Murdered by their mother.
Lawson family murders	December 25, 1929	0–17; 4 months	Germanton, North Carolina	Solved	Murder–suicide and familicide.

=== 1930s ===
Victim(s)	Date of death	Age	Location	Status	Description
Mary Haven	c. February 9, 1930	0 (2 months)	Schafer, North Dakota	Solved	Victims of Charles Bannon, the last person to be lynched in North Dakota.
Charles Haven	c. February 9, 1930	2	Schafer, North Dakota	Solved	Victims of Charles Bannon, the last person to be lynched in North Dakota.
Leland Haven	c. February 9, 1930	14	Schafer, North Dakota	Solved	Victims of Charles Bannon, the last person to be lynched in North Dakota.
Anabel Eicher	c. June 23, 1931	9	Park Ridge, Illinois	Solved	Killed by serial killer Harry Powers.
Harry Eicher	c. June 23, 1931	12	Park Ridge, Illinois	Solved	Killed by serial killer Harry Powers.
Greta Eicher	c. June 23, 1931	14	Park Ridge, Illinois	Solved	Killed by serial killer Harry Powers.
Vera Leonard	September 30, 1931	9	Winston-Salem, North Carolina	Solved	Final victim of serial killer Asbury Respus.
Charles Augustus Lindbergh Jr.	March 2, 1932	1	Hopewell Township, New Jersey	Solved	Victim of kidnapping and murder, child of aviator Col. Charles Lindbergh.
Fileman Martinez	October 7, 1932	16	Santa Fe, New Mexico	Solved	Murdered by his stepfather.
James Cordie Check	December 15, 1933	17	Maury County, Tennessee	Solved	Murdered for being falsely accused of rape.
Babes in the Wood murders (Pine Grove Furnace)	November 24, 1934	8–12	Philadelphia, Pennsylvania	Solved	Murder–suicide and familicide.

=== 1940s ===
Victim(s)	Date of death	Age	Location	Status	Description
Margaret Lynch	September 14, 1942	7	Bedford Village, New York	Solved	Murdered by Edward Haight.
Helen Lynch	September 14, 1942	8	Bedford Village, New York	Solved	Murdered by Edward Haight.
Willie James Howard	January 2, 1944	15	Live Oak, Florida	Solved	Lynched by a man who was upset his daughter received a Christmas card from Howard.
Thora Chamberlain	c. November 2, 1945	14	Campbell, California	Solved	Murdered by Thomas McMonigle.
Suzanne Degan	c. January 7, 1946	6	Edgewater, Chicago	Solved	Murdered by serial killer William Heirens.
Samuel Hill	November 6, 1948	7	Chester, Pennsylvania	Solved	Youngest victim of the Market Street Massacre.
Richard Noe	April 7, 1949	0 (1 month old)	Philadelphia, Pennsylvania	Solved	Murdered by his Serial Killer mother, Marie Noe.
Thelma Taylor	August 6, 1949	15	Portland, Oregon	Solved	Killed by Morris Leleand.
Thomas Hamilton	September 6, 1949	2	Camden, New Jersey	Solved	Victims of the Camden shootings.
Orris Martin Smith	September 6, 1949	6	Camden, New Jersey	Solved	Victims of the Camden shootings.
John M. Wilson	September 6, 1949	10	Camden, New Jersey	Solved	Victims of the Camden shootings.

=== 1950s ===
Victim(s)	Date of death	Age	Location	Status	Description
Elizabeth Noe	February 17, 1951	0 (5 months old)	Philadelphia, Pennsylvania	Solved	Murdered by her serial killer mother, Marie Noe.
Kathy Tongay	May 6, 1953	5	Miami, Florida	Solved	
Bobby Greenlease	September 28, 1953	6	Kansas City, Missouri	Solved	Murdered by Bonnie Heady and Carl Austin Hall.
Deborah Kay Fisher	March 8, 1954	0 (11 months)	Waterville, Maine	Solved	Killed by their mother during a psychotic episode.
Daniel Fisher	March 8, 1954	5	Waterville, Maine	Solved	Killed by their mother during a psychotic episode.
Richard Fisher	March 8, 1954	6	Waterville, Maine	Solved	Killed by their mother during a psychotic episode.
Emmett Till	August 28, 1955	14	Money, Mississippi	Solved	Lynched/murdered by Roy Bryant and J.W. Milam.
James Fitzpatrick II	November 1, 1955	1	Longmont, Colorado (in the air)	Solved	The youngest victim of the bombing of Flight 629, committed by Jack Gilbert Graham.
Patricia Grimes	December 28, 1956	12	Chicago, Illinois	Unsolved	
Barbara Grimes	December 28, 1956	15	Chicago, Illinois	Unsolved	
Joseph Augustus Zarelli	February 1957	4	Philadelphia, Pennsylvania	Unsolved, identified	Previously known as "The Boy in the Box." Unidentified until 2022.
Maria Ridulph	December 3, 1957	7	Sycamore, Illinois	Unsolved	A suspect was convicted in 2012, but was eventually exonerated in 2016.
Betty Jean Bartlett	January 22, 1958	2	Lincoln, Nebraska	Solved	Victims of Charles Starkweather and Caril Ann Fugate.
Carol King	January 27, 1958	16	Lincoln, Nebraska	Solved	Victims of Charles Starkweather and Caril Ann Fugate.
Robert Jensen	January 27, 1958	17	Lincoln, Nebraska	Solved	Victims of Charles Starkweather and Caril Ann Fugate.
Dusty Paul Orgeron	September 15, 1959	7	Houstan, Texas	Solved	Victims of the Poe Elementary school bombing. Dusty was the perpetrator's son.
William S Hawes Jr.	September 15, 1959	7	Houstan, Texas	Solved	Victims of the Poe Elementary school bombing. Dusty was the perpetrator's son.
John Cecil Fitch Jr.	September 15, 1959	8	Houstan, Texas	Solved	Victims of the Poe Elementary school bombing. Dusty was the perpetrator's son.
Kenyon Clutter	November 15, 1959	15	Holcomb, Kansas	Solved	Murdered with their parents during a robbery
Nancy Clutter	November 15, 1959	16	Holcomb, Kansas	Solved	Murdered with their parents during a robbery
Debbie Walker	December 19, 1959	1	Osprey, Florida	Unsolved	Murdered along with their parents.
Jimmie Walker	December 19, 1959	3	Osprey, Florida	Unsolved	Murdered along with their parents.
Maryann Mitchell	December 28, 1959	16	Philadelphia, Pennsylvania	Solved	Kidnapped, raped and murdered by Elmo Lee Smith, who was sentenced to death and executed in 1962.

=== 1960s ===
Victim(s)	Date of death	Age	Location	Status	Description
Sharon Lee Gallegos	c. July 17–24, 1960	4	Congress, Arizona	Unsolved, identified	Kidnapping and murder victim, abducted outside her house. Her body was found in the desert 10 days after her abduction. The exact cause of death remains undetermined, but was ruled a homicide.
Rene Duperrault	November 12, 1961	7	at sea in the Atlantic, near the Bahamas	Solved	Rene and Brian were murdered alongside their parents and the perpetrator's wife aboard the Bluebelle, followed by the perpetrator scuttling the ship. Perpetrator committed suicide after finding out one of the children, Terry Jo Duperrault, had survived the scuttling of the Bluebelle.
Brian Duperrault	November 12, 1961	14	at sea in the Atlantic, near the Bahamas	Solved	Rene and Brian were murdered alongside their parents and the perpetrator's wife aboard the Bluebelle, followed by the perpetrator scuttling the ship. Perpetrator committed suicide after finding out one of the children, Terry Jo Duperrault, had survived the scuttling of the Bluebelle.
Carol Ann Dougherty	October 26, 1962	9	Bristol Borough, Pennsylvania	Solved	The perpetrator, a man who died in 2002, was identified based on eyewitness testimony and a confession to his stepson, and the case was officially closed in October 2025.
Steven Crawford	July 11, 1963	2	Ashland, Oregon	Unsolved, identified	Crawford was previously unidentified. Jackson County law enforcement used DNA testing and genealogical tracing to identify his remains in 2021.
Carol Denise McNair	September 15, 1963	11	Birmingham, Alabama	Solved	Four girls killed in a bombing by the Ku Klux Klan.
Carole Robertson	September 15, 1963	14	Birmingham, Alabama	Solved	Four girls killed in a bombing by the Ku Klux Klan.
Cynthia Wesley	September 15, 1963	14	Birmingham, Alabama	Solved	Four girls killed in a bombing by the Ku Klux Klan.
Addie Mae Collins	September 15, 1963	14	Birmingham, Alabama	Solved	Four girls killed in a bombing by the Ku Klux Klan.
Mary Theresa Simpson	March 15, 1964	14	Elmira, New York	Solved	In February 2026, Elmira Police Department identified a perpetrator using DNA evidence and genealogical tracing. The identified perpetrator died in 2004.
Troy axe murders	September 28, 1964	5–17	Troy, Michigan	Solved	The perpetrator murdered his daughter with a shotgun and his five step children with an axe. The perpetrator was found guilty of first-degree murder and sentenced to life in prison in 1968.
Eric Hoyt	January 25, 1965	0 (3 months old)	Richford, New York	Solved	Murdered by his serial killer mother, Waneta Hoyt.
Dennis Jurgens	April 11, 1965	3	White Bear Lake, Minnesota	Solved	The perpetrator, Jurgens's adoptive mother, was found guilty and convicted of third-degree murder in 1987.
Kevin Dean Reida	April 25, 1965	5	Orcutt, California	Solved	Victim of 1965 Highway 101 sniper attack. Perpetrator died from self-inflicted gunshot wound.
Sylvia Likens	October 26, 1965	16	Indianapolis, Indiana	Solved	Her caretaker was sentenced to life imprisonment in 1966 and released on parole in 1985.
Jessica Young	November 22, 1965	0 (11 months old)	Aiea, Hawaii	Solved	Killed by their mother during a psychotic episode.
Jeanette Young	November 22, 1965	2	Aiea, Hawaii	Solved	Killed by their mother during a psychotic episode.
Judy Young	November 22, 1965	3	Aiea, Hawaii	Solved	Killed by their mother during a psychotic episode.
Janice Young	November 22, 1965	5	Aiea, Hawaii	Solved	Killed by their mother during a psychotic episode.
James Jr. Young	November 22, 1965	8	Aiea, Hawaii	Solved	Killed by their mother during a psychotic episode.
Mark Gabour	August 1, 1966	16	Austin, Texas	Solved	Victims of the University of Texas tower shooting. Perpetrator killed onsite by police.
Karen Griffith	August 1, 1966	17	Austin, Texas	Solved	Victims of the University of Texas tower shooting. Perpetrator killed onsite by police.
Debra LaRea Sellers	November 12, 1966	3	Mesa, Arizona	Solved	Victim of the 1966 Rose-Mar College of Beauty shooting.
Julie Hoyt	September 5, 1968	0 (6 weeks old)	Richford, New York.	Solved	Murdered by his serial killer mother, Waneta Hoyt.
James Hoyt	September 19, 1968	2	Richford, New York.	Solved	Murdered by his serial killer mother, Waneta Hoyt.
Jane Durrua	November 5, 1968	13	Keansburg, New Jersey	Solved	
Marina Habe	December 30, 1968	17	Los Angeles County, California	Unsolved	Daughter of writer Hans Habe and actress Eloise Hardt. Possible victim of Charles Manson's followers.
Barbara Jean Ringrose	January 1–2, 1969	12	Westernville, New York	Solved	Victims of Westernville New Year's Day shooting.
Milton James Pepper	January 1–2, 1969	14	Westernville, New York	Solved	Victims of Westernville New Year's Day shooting.
Ileana Torres	June 25, 1969	7	Jersey City, New Jersey	Solved	Murdered alongside their mother and older sisters by their father.
Annie Torres	June 25, 1969	10	Jersey City, New Jersey	Solved	Murdered alongside their mother and older sisters by their father.
Victor Torres	June 25, 1969	11	Jersey City, New Jersey	Solved	Murdered alongside their mother and older sisters by their father.
Fay Torres	June 25, 1969	12	Jersey City, New Jersey	Solved	Murdered alongside their mother and older sisters by their father.
Carrie Torres	June 25, 1969	17	Jersey City, New Jersey	Solved	Murdered alongside their mother and older sisters by their father.

=== 1970s ===
Victim(s)	Date of death	Age	Location	Status	Description
Dean Corll victims	September 25, 1970 – August 3, 1973	13–17	Houston, Texas	Solved, unidentified	One victim remains unidentified, Harris County John Doe (1973).
Rhonda Johnson	August 4, 1971	14	Galveston, Texas	Solved	A perpetrator was convicted in 1975. A different murderer confessed to killing them in 1998.
Sharon Shaw	August 4, 1971	13	Galveston, Texas	Solved	A perpetrator was convicted in 1975. A different murderer confessed to killing them in 1998.
Frederick List	November 9, 1971	13	West Field, New Jersey	Solved	The victims' father shot and killed his children, his wife, and his mother. The perpetrator adopted a new identity and evaded law enforcement until he was captured in 1989. He was sentenced to life in prison in 1990.
John List Jr.	November 9, 1971	15	West Field, New Jersey	Solved	The victims' father shot and killed his children, his wife, and his mother. The perpetrator adopted a new identity and evaded law enforcement until he was captured in 1989. He was sentenced to life in prison in 1990.
Patricia List	November 9, 1971	16	West Field, New Jersey	Solved	The victims' father shot and killed his children, his wife, and his mother. The perpetrator adopted a new identity and evaded law enforcement until he was captured in 1989. He was sentenced to life in prison in 1990.
Alphabet murders	November 16, 1971 – November 26, 1973	10–11	Rochester, New York	Unsolved	The victims were Carmen Colón, Michelle Maenza, and Wanda Walkowicz.
Timothy McCoy	January 3, 1972	16	Chicago, Illinois	Solved	Victim remained unidentified until 1986; the first known victim of serial killer John Wayne Gacy and the only victim of his to be stabbed.
Danny Croteau	April 14, 1972	13	Chicopee, Massachusetts	Solved	Suspected perpetrator died as his arrest warrant was being prepared, and the case was subsequently closed.
Linda Hogan	June 28, 1972	10	High Point, North Carolina	Solved	Murdered alongside their mother by serial killer Nollie Martin.
Karen Hogan	June 28, 1972	13	High Point, North Carolina	Solved	Murdered alongside their mother by serial killer Nollie Martin.
Aileen Wells	April 22, 1973	13	Los Angeles, California	Solved	Victim of the 1973 South Los Angeles shootings.
Santos Rodriguez	July 24, 1973	12	Dallas, Texas	Solved	Law enforcement official murdered Rodriguez while attempting to extort a false confession to burglary.
Lisa Ann French	October 31, 1973	9	Fond du Lac, Wisconsin	Solved	Murdered by her neighbor on Halloween night.
Dana Baade	November 17, 1973	13	Lyon County, Iowa	Solved	Victims of the 1973 Gitchie Manitou murders.
Michael Hadrath	November 17, 1973	15	Lyon County, Iowa	Solved	Victims of the 1973 Gitchie Manitou murders.
Joseph Jr. Otero	January 15, 1974	9	Wichita, Kansas	Solved	Smothered and suffocated alongside their parents by Dennis Lynn Rader, also known as the “BTK” killer.
Josephine Otero	January 15, 1974	11	Wichita, Kansas	Solved	
Martha Morrison	September 1974	17	Portland, Oregon	Solved	Victim remained unidentified until 2015.
Linda Pagano	c. 1974	17	Akron or Strongsville, Ohio	Unsolved, identified	In 2018, forensic DNA analysis confirmed the remains were Pagano. Her stepfather, the only potential suspect, died in 1990.
Timothy O'Bryan	October 31, 1974	8	Pasadena, Texas	Solved	Killed by his father in an insurance fraud scheme. His father was later convicted and executed.
John DeFeo	November 13, 1974	9	Amityville, New York	Solved	Victims killed alongside their parents and adult sister by their adult brother in the Amityville murders.
Mark DeFeo	November 13, 1974	12	Amityville, New York	Solved	Victims killed alongside their parents and adult sister by their adult brother in the Amityville murders.
Allison DeFeo	November 13, 1974	13	Amityville, New York	Solved	Victims killed alongside their parents and adult sister by their adult brother in the Amityville murders.
Marcia Trimble	February 25, 1975	9	Nashville, Tennessee	Solved	Perpetrator identified in 2008 and convicted in 2009.
John Rupert	March 30, 1975	4	Hamilton, Ohio	Solved	Victims of the Easter Sunday massacre.
Teresa Rupert	March 30, 1975	9	Hamilton, Ohio	Solved	Victims of the Easter Sunday massacre.
David Rupert	March 30, 1975	11	Hamilton, Ohio	Solved	Victims of the Easter Sunday massacre.
Ann Rupert	March 30, 1975	12	Hamilton, Ohio	Solved	Victims of the Easter Sunday massacre.
Carol Rupert	March 30, 1975	13	Hamilton, Ohio	Solved	Victims of the Easter Sunday massacre.
Micheal Rupert	March 30, 1975	16	Hamilton, Ohio	Solved	Victims of the Easter Sunday massacre.
Leornard Rupert III	March 30, 1975	17	Hamilton, Ohio	Solved	Victims of the Easter Sunday massacre.
Martha Moxley	October 30, 1975	15	Greenwich, Connecticut	Solved	Highly public case due to the perpetrator being a relative of the Kennedy Family.
Tatiana Blackwell	January 24 – February 2, 1976	14	San Mateo County, California	Unsolved	Victims of an unidentified serial killer.
Paula Baxter	January 24 – February 2, 1976	17	San Mateo County, California	Unsolved	Victims of an unidentified serial killer.
Oakland County Child murders	February 1976 – March 1977	10–12	Oakland County, Michigan	Unsolved	Victims of the Oakland County Child Killer. Their deaths triggered a murder investigation which at the time was the largest in U.S. history.
Lori Ann Smith	May 4, 1976	8	Cobb County, Georgia	Solved	Victim of child rape and murder. Perpetrator was sentenced to death in 1976.
Randall Reffett	May 14, 1976	15	Chicago, Illinois	Solved	Victims of serial killer John Wayne Gacy.
Samuel Stapleton	May 14, 1976	14	Chicago, Illinois	Solved	Victims of serial killer John Wayne Gacy.
Michael Bonnin	June 3, 1976	17	Chicago, Illinois	Solved	Victim of serial killer John Wayne Gacy.
William Carroll Jr.	June 13, 1976	16	Chicago, Illinois	Solved	Victim of serial killer John Wayne Gacy.
Cynthia Driggers	July 31, 1976	13	Winter Garden, Florida	Solved	Raped and killed by her uncle, who was sentenced to death and executed in 2026.
James Haakenson	August 5, 1976	16	Chicago, Illinois	Solved	Unidentified until 2017; victim of serial killer John Wayne Gacy.
Rick Johnston	August 6, 1976	17	Chicago, Illinois	Solved	Victim of serial killer John Wayne Gacy.
Lisa Lynn Berry	October 22, 1976	8	Fort Lauderdale, Florida	Solved	Victim of abduction and murder. Perpetrator sentenced to death in 1998.
Kenneth Parker	October 24, 1976	16	Chicago, Illinois	Solved	Victims of serial killer John Wayne Gacy.
Michael Marino	October 24, 1976	14	Chicago, Illinois	Solved	Victims of serial killer John Wayne Gacy.
Gregory Godzik	December 12, 1976	17	Chicago, Illinois	Solved	Victim of serial killer John Wayne Gacy.
Evelyn Colon	c. December 13–19, 1976	15	White Haven, Pennsylvania	Unsolved	Unidentified until 2021; an alleged killer was initially charged, but new evidence led to the dismissal of those charges. The case remains unsolved.
Lori Farmer	June 12, 1977	8	Mayes County, Oklahoma	Unsolved	Three girls murdered while at a summer camp. The prime suspect has since died and DNA samples from the killer are now insufficient to process.
Michele Guse	June 12, 1977	9	Mayes County, Oklahoma	Unsolved	Three girls murdered while at a summer camp. The prime suspect has since died and DNA samples from the killer are now insufficient to process.
Doris Milner	June 12, 1977	11	Mayes County, Oklahoma	Unsolved	Three girls murdered while at a summer camp. The prime suspect has since died and DNA samples from the killer are now insufficient to process.
Beaudoin family mass murder	July 22, 1977	4–12	Prospect, Connecticut	Solved	Perpetrator beat eight children, ages 4–12, to death with a tire iron.
David Galvin	August 26, 1977	14	Mansfield Township, New Jersey	Solved	Victim of the Erie Lackawanna railway shooting.
Robert Winch	November 10, 1977	16	Chicago, Illinois	Solved	Victim of serial killer John Wayne Gacy.
Brian Glenfeldt	January 8, 1978	17	Hialeah, Florida	Solved	Victims of Carol City murders.
Belinda Worley	January 8, 1978	17	Hialeah, Florida	Solved	Victims of Carol City murders.
Trisa Thornley	January 23, 1978	8	Ocala, Florida	Solved	Kidnapped and murdered on her way home from school. Perpetrator was convicted and executed in 1989.
Kimberly Diane Leach	February 9, 1978	12	Lake City, Florida	Solved	Final victim of serial killer Ted Bundy.
Terri Horst	July 16, 1978	15	Oklahoma City, Oklahoma	Solved	Victim of serial killer and mass murderer Roger Dale Stafford.
David Salsman	July 16, 1978	16	Oklahoma City, Oklahoma	Solved	Victim of serial killer and mass murderer Roger Dale Stafford.
David Lindsey	July 16, 1978	17	Oklahoma City, Oklahoma	Solved	Victim of serial killer and mass murderer Roger Dale Stafford.
Anthony Tew	July 16, 1978	17	Oklahoma City, Oklahoma	Solved	Victim of serial killer and mass murderer Roger Dale Stafford.
Rebecca David	August 3, 1978	5	Salt Lake City, Utah	Solved	The victims' mother coerced her older children to jump and threw her younger children from an 11th floor balcony of a hotel. The perpetrator also jumped from the balcony. The victims' father, Immanuel David, had proclaimed himself a divine prophet and ordered the suicides. Immanuel killed himself 3 days before his wife and children died. One child, Rachel David, survived.
David David	August 3, 1978	6	Salt Lake City, Utah	Solved	The victims' mother coerced her older children to jump and threw her younger children from an 11th floor balcony of a hotel. The perpetrator also jumped from the balcony. The victims' father, Immanuel David, had proclaimed himself a divine prophet and ordered the suicides. Immanuel killed himself 3 days before his wife and children died. One child, Rachel David, survived.
Joseph David	August 3, 1978	8	Salt Lake City, Utah	Solved	The victims' mother coerced her older children to jump and threw her younger children from an 11th floor balcony of a hotel. The perpetrator also jumped from the balcony. The victims' father, Immanuel David, had proclaimed himself a divine prophet and ordered the suicides. Immanuel killed himself 3 days before his wife and children died. One child, Rachel David, survived.
Deborah David	August 3, 1978	9	Salt Lake City, Utah	Solved	The victims' mother coerced her older children to jump and threw her younger children from an 11th floor balcony of a hotel. The perpetrator also jumped from the balcony. The victims' father, Immanuel David, had proclaimed himself a divine prophet and ordered the suicides. Immanuel killed himself 3 days before his wife and children died. One child, Rachel David, survived.
Joshua David	August 3, 1978	10	Salt Lake City, Utah	Solved	The victims' mother coerced her older children to jump and threw her younger children from an 11th floor balcony of a hotel. The perpetrator also jumped from the balcony. The victims' father, Immanuel David, had proclaimed himself a divine prophet and ordered the suicides. Immanuel killed himself 3 days before his wife and children died. One child, Rachel David, survived.
Elizabeth David	August 3, 1978	15	Salt Lake City, Utah	Solved	The victims' mother coerced her older children to jump and threw her younger children from an 11th floor balcony of a hotel. The perpetrator also jumped from the balcony. The victims' father, Immanuel David, had proclaimed himself a divine prophet and ordered the suicides. Immanuel killed himself 3 days before his wife and children died. One child, Rachel David, survived.
Bear Brook murders	c. November 1978	0–7 (4 months)	Allenstown, New Hampshire	Solved	Four victims total, three were children and one was an adult female. The adult, oldest and youngest victims were identified in June 2019 as Marlyse Honeychurch, Marie Vaughn and Sarah McWaters. Honeychurch was the mother of the two now-identified children, who were half-sisters. The middle child, determined to be the daughter of serial killer Terry Peder Rasmussen, was later identified as Rea Rasmussen.
Kerry Graham	December 1978	15	Willits, California	Unsolved	Victims remained unidentified until 2015.
Francine Trimble	December 1978	14	Willits, California	Unsolved	Victims remained unidentified until 2015.
Robert Piest	December 11, 1978	15	Chicago, Illinois	Solved	Final victim of serial killer John Wayne Gacy.
Devonna Nelson	c. 1979	14	Missoula, Montana	Solved	Presumed victim of probable serial killer Wayne Nance. She remained unidentified until 2009.
Rebecca Kunash	May 11, 1979	6	Merritt Island, Florida	Solved	Kidnapped, raped and murdered in 1979. Perpetrator sentenced to death and executed in 2025.
Etan Patz	May 25, 1979	6	New York City, New York	Solved, body never found	Perpetrator sentenced to 25-years-to-life in April 2017.
Robin Christine Samsoe	June 20, 1979	12	Huntington Beach, California	Solved	Victim of serial killer Rodney Alcala.
Atlanta murders of 1979–81	July 21, 1979 – March 12, 1981	9–17	Atlanta, Georgia	Solved	24 child victims of a serial killer.
Tammy Vincent	September 1979	16	Tiburon, California	Unsolved	Victim remained unidentified until 2007.
Doreen Levesque	October 13, 1979	17	Fall River, Massachusetts	Solved	Victim of Fall River murders.
Tammy Alexander	November 9, 1979	16	Caledonia, New York	Unsolved, identified	Teenager shot and left in a cornfield in upstate New York. Known previously as only "Caledonia Jane Doe" or "Cali Doe", Alexander remained unidentified until 2015.

=== 1980s ===
Victim(s)	Date of death	Age	Location	Status	Description
Cassidy Johnson	February 25, 1980	2	Blountstown, Florida	Solved	Murdered by serial killer babysitter, Christine Falling.
Suzanne Bombardier	June 22, 1980	14	Antioch, California	Unsolved	The perpetrator arrested on December 11, 2017, through DNA evidence. Bacom was sentenced to life without parole for the murder in June 2022.
Sherri Jarvis	November 1, 1980	14	Huntsville, Texas	Unsolved, identified	Victim remained unidentified until 2021.
Carol Cole	December 1980	17	Bellevue, Louisiana	Unsolved, identified	Victim remained unidentified until 2015.
Redhead murders	c. 1981–1992	9–17	Various	Unsolved, unidentified	Victims of an unidentified serial killer that were left on the side of highways. Not all presumed victims have been verified to be linked.
Adam Walsh	c. July 27, 1981	6	Indian River County, Florida	Solved	Victim of serial killer Ottis Toole.
Frieda Powell	c. 1982	15	Ringgold, Texas	Solved, body never found	Henry Lee Lucas confessed to killing his teenage girlfriend while in Texas. Authorities believe his confession, yet efforts to confirm the remains identified by Lucas to be hers were inconclusive.
Carolyn Eaton	c. February 1982	17	Williams, Arizona	Unsolved, identified	Unidentified and known as Valentine Sally until February 2021.
Amy Gaffney	February 16, 1982	4	Farwell, Michigan	Solved	Victims of the Rock Road massacre.
Tom Gaffney	February 16, 1982	8	Farwell, Michigan	Solved	Victims of the Rock Road massacre.
Angela Gaffney	February 16, 1982	10	Farwell, Michigan	Solved	Victims of the Rock Road massacre.
Shannah Wicklund	April 14, 1982	9	Clearview, Washington	Solved	Murdered along with her mother and a neighbor in a revenge killing.
Dawn Olanick	c. Early July 1982	17	Blairstown, New Jersey	Solved	A teenaged murder victim found at the edge of a cemetery. A couple confessed in 2005 to killing her, but without her identity there was not enough information to put a case together.
Ricky Stetson	August 22, 1982	11	Portland, Maine	Solved	The first of three victims of John Joubert and the only victim murdered in Maine.
Alisha Heinrich	December 3 or 4, 1982	1	Moss Point, Mississippi	Unsolved	A toddler thrown from a bridge into a river. Known only as "Delta Dawn", Heinrich remained unidentified until 2020. Her mother, who disappeared alongside her, remains missing.
St. Louis Jane Doe	February 1983	10	St. Louis, Missouri	Unsolved, unidentified	Found decapitated and naked from the waist down in the basement of an abandoned building.
Jeanine Nicarico	February 25, 1983	10	Naperville, Illinois	Solved	Perpetrator confessed in 1985. The case is notable for the wrongful conviction of Rolando Cruz.
Cheryl Lynn Downs	May 19, 1983	7	Springfield, Oregon	Solved	The perpetrator shot her three children. Two survived with disabilities, and one, Cheryl, died.
Keith Bibbs	July 20, 1983	16	Lake Village, Indiana	Unsolved, identified	Victim of serial killer Larry Eyler. He remained unidentified until 2023.
Danny Joe Eberle	September 18, 1983	13	Bellevue, Nebraska	Solved	Second victim of John Joubert.
Christoper Walden	December 2, 1983	12	Papillion, Nebraska	Solved	Third and final victim of John Joubert.
Colleen Orsborn	March 19, 1984	15	Daytona Beach, Florida	Solved	Victim remained unidentified until 2011.
Mei Lung	April 10, 1984	9	San Francisco, California	Solved	Previous cold case, now revealed to be the first victim of serial killer, Richard Ramirez.
Christy Ann Fornoff	May 9, 1984	13	Tempe, Arizona	Solved	Murdered and raped by Donald Edward Beaty, who was sentenced to death and executed in 2011.
Carlos Reyes	July 18, 1984	0 (8 months)	San Diego, California	Solved	Victims of the San Ysidro McDonald's massacre. Perpetrator killed by police on site.
Claudia Pérez	July 18, 1984	9	San Diego, California	Solved	Victims of the San Ysidro McDonald's massacre. Perpetrator killed by police on site.
Matao Herrera	July 18, 1984	11	San Diego, California	Solved	Victims of the San Ysidro McDonald's massacre. Perpetrator killed by police on site.
David Flores Delgado	July 18, 1984	11	San Diego, California	Solved	Victims of the San Ysidro McDonald's massacre. Perpetrator killed by police on site.
Omarr Alonso Hernandez	July 18, 1984	11	San Diego, California	Solved	Victims of the San Ysidro McDonald's massacre. Perpetrator killed by police on site.
Scott Nelson	September 29, 1984	17	Louisville, Kentucky	Solved	Both perpetrators caught and convicted. One sentenced to life imprisonment and the other sentenced to death.
Richard Stephenson	September 29, 1984	17	Louisville, Kentucky	Solved	Both perpetrators caught and convicted. One sentenced to life imprisonment and the other sentenced to death.
Marcella Bachmann	c. September – October 1984	16	Missoula, Montana	Solved	Presumed victim of probable serial killer Wayne Nance. She remained unidentified until 2006.
Jonelle Matthews	December 20, 1984	12	Greeley, Colorado	Solved	Previous missing person case. Murderer was later convicted in 2022.
Erin Eastburn	May 12, 1985	3	Fayetteville, North Carolina	Solved	Murdered alongside their mother by their father.
Kara Eastburn	May 12, 1985	5	Fayetteville, North Carolina	Solved	Murdered alongside their mother by their father.
Shari Smith	May 31 / June 1, 1985	17	Lexington County, South Carolina	Solved	Abducted and murdered by serial killer Larry Gene Bell.
Debra Helmick	June 15, 1985	9	Richland County, South Carolina	Solved	A girl abducted from her front yard and subsequently murdered by Larry Gene Bell, also responsible for the abduction and murder of Shari Smith. He was later convicted and executed for her murder.
Raymond Charles Fife	September 12, 1985	12	Warren, Ohio	Solved	Two perpetrators were found guilty of aggravated murder and rape of the boy. One of them was sentenced to life imprisonment and later died in prison in 2018, while the other perpetrator was sentenced to death.
Michele Avila	October 1, 1985	17	Angeles National Forest, California	Solved	Two perpetrators found guilty of second-degree murder after holding Avila's head underwater in the Angeles National Forest.
Recife Cosmen	October 30, 1985	2	Springfield Township, Pennsylvania	Solved	Youngest victim of the Springfield Mall shooting.
Christopher Ricco	November 26, 1985	14	Spanaway, Washington	Solved	Shot by Gordon's ex-girlfriend for breaking up with her.
Gordon Pickett	November 26, 1985	15	Spanaway, Washington	Solved	Shot by Gordon's ex-girlfriend for breaking up with her.
Tami Lynne Tinning	December 20, 1985	0 (4 months old)	Schenectady County, New York	Solved	Murdered by her Mother, Marybeth Tinning. She is suspected of killing her eight siblings.
Zosha Lee Pickett	June 27, 1986	2	Tucson, Arizona	Solved	Kidnapped and killed by Daren Lee Bolton, who was sentenced to death and executed in 1996.
Darcie Frackenpohl	1987	17	Sacramento, California	Solved	Victim remained unidentified for several months.
Farrah Newton	April 7, 1987	1 (22 months)	Texas	Solved	Killed alongside their father Adrian by their mother Frances Newton. She was sentenced to death and executed.
Alton Newton	April 7, 1987	7	Texas	Solved	Killed alongside their father Adrian by their mother Frances Newton. She was sentenced to death and executed.
Teresa Mae McAbee	May 11, 1987	11	Mascotte, Florida	Solved	Victim of suspected serial killer James Aren Duckett, who was sentenced to death and executed on July 28, 2026, for first-degree murder.
Newborn daughter	November 18, 1987	0	Ina, Illinois	Unsolved	Victims of the Dardeen family homicides. Ruby Dardeen, the victims' mother, gave birth during the attacks to a daughter. The newborn was killed. Ruby was killed alongside her children, and the father, Keith Dardeen, was found dead in a field one mile away from the house. The lead suspect, a man who confessed to the Dardeen family homicides, was executed in Texas in 2014 for an unrelated 1999 homicide. The suspect's confessions were not consistent, and Keith's living mother, Joeann Dardeen, questions the veracity of his claims.
Peter Dardeen	November 18, 1987	3	Ina, Illinois	Unsolved	
Deanna Criswell	c. November 23, 1987	16	Marana, Arizona	Solved, identified	Victim remained unidentified until 2015.
Barbara Sue Simmons	December 22, 1987	3	Pope County, Arkansas	Solved	Murdered by their Grandfather Ronald Gene Simmons.
Rebecca Simmons	December 22, 1987	8	Pope County, Arkansas	Solved	Murdered by their Grandfather Ronald Gene Simmons.
Marianne Simmons	December 22, 1987	11	Pope County, Arkansas	Solved	Murdered by their Grandfather Ronald Gene Simmons.
Eddy Simmons	December 22, 1987	14	Pope County, Arkansas	Solved	Murdered by their Grandfather Ronald Gene Simmons.
Loretta Simmons	December 22, 1987	17	Pope County, Arkansas	Solved	Murdered by their Grandfather Ronald Gene Simmons.
Micheal McNulty	December 26, 1987	1	Pope County, Arkansas	Solved	Murdered by their Grandfather, Ronald Gene Simmons.
William Simmons III	December 26, 1987	1	Pope County, Arkansas	Solved	Murdered by their Grandfather, Ronald Gene Simmons.
Sylvia McNulty	December 26, 1987	6	Pope County, Arkansas	Solved	Murdered by their Grandfather, Ronald Gene Simmons.
James Doxtator	January 16, 1988	14	Milwaukee, Wisconsin	Solved	Victim of Jeffrey Dahmer.
Lakeisha Clay	March 28, 1988	6	Nashville, Tennessee	Solved	Killed alongside their mother in the Clay family murders in 1988. Perpetrator was sentenced to death and executed in 2025 for the triple murder.
Latoya Clay	March 28, 1988	9	Nashville, Tennessee	Solved	Killed alongside their mother in the Clay family murders in 1988. Perpetrator was sentenced to death and executed in 2025 for the triple murder.
April Tinsley	April 1–2, 1988	8	Fort Wayne, Indiana	Solved	Suspect arrested on July 15, 2018.
Nick Corwin	May 20, 1988	8	Winnetka, Illinois	Solved	Victim of Hubbard Woods Elementary School shooting.
Jennifer Marie Wilson	June 6, 1988	9	Flagstaff, Arizona	Solved	Kidnapped and killed by Richard Lynn Bible, who was sentenced to death and executed in 2011.
Judith Barsi	July 25, 1988	10	Los Angeles, California	Solved	Child actor murdered along with her mother by her father in murder-suicide.
Jaclyn Dowaliby	September 10, 1988	7	Midlothian, Illinois	Unsolved	Victim's stepfather was initially convicted and sentenced to 45 years in 1990, but he was released in 1991 after the conviction was overturned.
Ram Chun	January 17, 1989	6	Stockton, California	Solved	Victims of the Stockton schoolyard shooting.
Sokhim An	January 17, 1989	6	Stockton, California	Solved	Victims of the Stockton schoolyard shooting.
Thuy Tran	January 17, 1989	6	Stockton, California	Solved	Victims of the Stockton schoolyard shooting.
Oeun Lim	January 17, 1989	8	Stockton, California	Solved	Victims of the Stockton schoolyard shooting.
Rathanar Or	January 17, 1989	9	Stockton, California	Solved	Victims of the Stockton schoolyard shooting.
Aundria Bowman	c. March 11, 1989	14	Hamilton, Michigan	Solved	A teenager listed as a missing person for over thirty years, after her adoptive parents reported her as a runaway. Her remains were located in February 2020 after her adoptive father confessed to her murder. He was sentenced to life imprisonment.
Christie Rogers	c. June 1, 1989	14	Tampa, Florida	Solved	Perpetrator drowned them in Tampa Bay alongside their mother.
Michelle Rogers	c. June 1, 1989	17	Tampa, Florida	Solved	Perpetrator drowned them in Tampa Bay alongside their mother.
Emily DeLisle	August 3, 1989	0 (9 months)	Wyandotte, Michigan	Solved	Victims killed by their father after he drove a station wagon into the Detroit River with the family inside. The perpetrator and the victims' mother escaped and survived, and all four children in the car drowned.
Kathryn DeLisle	August 3, 1989	2	Wyandotte, Michigan	Solved	Victims killed by their father after he drove a station wagon into the Detroit River with the family inside. The perpetrator and the victims' mother escaped and survived, and all four children in the car drowned.
Melissa DeLisle	August 3, 1989	4	Wyandotte, Michigan	Solved	Victims killed by their father after he drove a station wagon into the Detroit River with the family inside. The perpetrator and the victims' mother escaped and survived, and all four children in the car drowned.
Bryan DeLisle	August 3, 1989	8	Wyandotte, Michigan	Solved	Victims killed by their father after he drove a station wagon into the Detroit River with the family inside. The perpetrator and the victims' mother escaped and survived, and all four children in the car drowned.
Melissa Heaton	September 1, 1989	8	Warwick, Rhode Island	Solved	Victims of serial killer Craig Price. Killed alongside their mother.
Jennifer Heaton	September 1, 1989	10	Warwick, Rhode Island	Solved	Victims of serial killer Craig Price. Killed alongside their mother.
Sue Ann Huskey	c. September 1989	17	Williamson County, Texas	Unsolved, identified	Victim remained unidentified until January 2020.
Jacob Wetterling	c. October 22, 1989	11	St. Joseph, Minnesota	Solved	Victim remained a missing person for nearly 27 years before the location of his remains was disclosed by Jacob's murderer.

=== 1990s ===
Victim(s)	Date of death	Age	Location	Status	Description
Charlotte Jo Parker	February 2, 1990	9	Walnut, Quitman County, Mississippi	Solved	Murdered alongside their parents Carl and Bobbie Jo.
Gregory Parker	February 2, 1990	12	Walnut, Quitman County, Mississippi	Solved	Murdered alongside their parents Carl and Bobbie Jo.
Daisy Marie Falco	March 25, 1990	16	Bronx, New York City, New York.	Solved	Victims of the Happy Land fire.
Jose Amilcar Alfaro Paz	March 25, 1990	17	Bronx, New York City, New York.	Solved	Victims of the Happy Land fire.
Isabel Lopez	March 25, 1990	17	Bronx, New York City, New York.	Solved	Victims of the Happy Land fire.
Norman Clark	March 25, 1990	17	Bronx, New York City, New York.	Solved	Victims of the Happy Land fire.
Rachanda Pickle	1990	13	Oregon	Solved	Stepfather charged in 2013.
Robin Cornell	May 10, 1990	11	Cape Coral, Florida	Solved	One of the two victims of the 1990 Cape Coral murders. The killer, Joseph Zieler, was caught in 2016, and sentenced to death in 2023.
Curtis Straughter	March 7, 1991	17	Milwaukee, Wisconsin	Solved	Victim of Jeffrey Dahmer.
Konerak Sinthasomphone	May 27, 1991	14	Milwaukee, Wisconsin	Solved	Victim of Jeffrey Dahmer.
Mandy Meyers	July 8, 1991	13	Elfrida, Arizona	Solved	Both victims were raped and murdered by two perpetrators. One perpetrator was jailed 20 years while the other was sentenced to death and executed in 2012.
Mary Snyder	July 8, 1991	13	Elfrida, Arizona	Solved	Both victims were raped and murdered by two perpetrators. One perpetrator was jailed 20 years while the other was sentenced to death and executed in 2012.
Anjelica Castillo	c. July 18, 1991	4	Astoria, New York	Solved	Victim remained unidentified until 2013.
Mandy Lemaire	August 22, 1991	11	Tazlina, Alaska	Unsolved	Suspect's conviction was overturned in 1999. He died before the completion of the second trial.
Amy Ayers	December 6, 1991	13	Austin, Texas	Solved	Four girls raped, shot, and burnt in an I Can't Believe It's Yogurt shop in Austin, Texas.
Sarah Harbison	December 6, 1991	15	Austin, Texas	Solved	Four girls raped, shot, and burnt in an I Can't Believe It's Yogurt shop in Austin, Texas.
Jennifer Harbison	December 6, 1991	17	Austin, Texas	Solved	Four girls raped, shot, and burnt in an I Can't Believe It's Yogurt shop in Austin, Texas.
Eliza Thomas	December 6, 1991	17	Austin, Texas	Solved	Four girls raped, shot, and burnt in an I Can't Believe It's Yogurt shop in Austin, Texas.
Shanda Sharer	January 11, 1992	12	Madison, Indiana	Solved	
Beamon Aton Hill	May 1, 1992	16	Olivehurst, California	Solved	Victims of the 1992 Lindhurst High School shooting.
Judy Davis	May 1, 1992	17	Olivehurst, California	Solved	Victims of the 1992 Lindhurst High School shooting.
Dantrell Davis	October 13, 1992	7	Chicago, Illinois	Solved	Perpetrator accidentally shot Davis while targeting rival gang member, and he confessed the following day to shooting Davis.
Dina Spiro	November 1992	11	Rancho Santa Fe, California	Solved	Perpetrator committed suicide by cyanide during manhunt.
Adam Spiro	November 1992	14	Rancho Santa Fe, California	Solved	Perpetrator committed suicide by cyanide during manhunt.
Sara Spiro	November 1992	16	Rancho Santa Fe, California	Solved	Perpetrator committed suicide by cyanide during manhunt.
Michael C. Castro	January 8, 1993	16	Palatine, Illinois	Solved	Victims of the Brown's Chicken massacre.
Rico L. Solis	January 8, 1993	17	Palatine, Illinois	Solved	Victims of the Brown's Chicken massacre.
Jennifer Odom	February 19, 1993	12	Dade City, Florida	Solved	Odom's case was unsolved for 30 years before the suspect, Jeffrey Crum, was arrested in 2023 after DNA testing linked him to the crime. Crum was convicted of first-degree murder in August 2026.
Derrick Joseph Robie	August 2, 1993	4	Savona, New York	Solved	Victim of Eric Smith.
Holly Piirainen	August 5, 1993	10	Sturbridge, Massachusetts	Unsolved	
Kori Lamaster	August 1993	17	California	Unsolved	Victim remained unidentified until 2013.
Polly Klaas	October 1, 1993	12	Petaluma, California	Solved	Victim of Richard Allen Davis.
Ben Grant	December 14, 1993	17	Aurora, Colorado	Solved	Victims of the 1993 Aurora, Colorado shooting.
Colleen O' Connor	December 14, 1993	17	Aurora, Colorado	Solved	Victims of the 1993 Aurora, Colorado shooting.
Ari Halberstam	March 1, 1994	16	New York City, New York	Solved	Victim of the 1994 Brooklyn Bridge shooting.
Nathaniel Baker	April 16, 1994	17	Gadsden, Alabama	Solved	Victim of the 1994 Popeye's shooting.
Edward Jon "Kim" Zakrzewski III	June 9, 1994	7	Mary Esther, Florida	Solved	Victims of the Zakrzewski family murders. The two children were killed alongside their 34-year-old mother Sylvia Zakrzewski by their father Edward James Zakrzewski II, who was sentenced to death and executed in 2025 for the triple murder.
Anna Zakrzewski	June 9, 1994	5	Mary Esther, Florida	Solved	Victims of the Zakrzewski family murders. The two children were killed alongside their 34-year-old mother Sylvia Zakrzewski by their father Edward James Zakrzewski II, who was sentenced to death and executed in 2025 for the triple murder.
Megan Kanka	July 29, 1994	7	Hamilton Township, New Jersey	Solved	Murdered by her neighbor, a convicted sex offender.
Robert Sandifer	September 1, 1994	11	Chicago, Illinois	Solved	Victim was killed by fellow gang members.
Eric Morse	October 13, 1994	5	Chicago, Illinois	Solved	The two perpetrators, also minors, lethally dropped Morse from a 14th-floor window.
Alexander Tyler Smith	October 25, 1994	1	Union County, South Carolina	Solved	Murdered by their mother.
Micheal Daniel Smith	October 25, 1994	3	Union County, South Carolina	Solved	Murdered by their mother.
Deidra Buenrostro	October 25, 1994	4	San Jacinto, California	Solved	Murdered by her mother.
Vincente Buenrostro	October 27, 1994	8	San Jacinto, California	Solved	Murdered by their mother.
Susana Buenrostro	October 27, 1994	9	San Jacinto, California	Solved	Murdered by their mother.
Erik Freeman	February 26, 1995	11	Lehigh County, Pennsylvania	Solved	Murdered alongside his parents by his brother.
Cuong Vu	March 3–4, 1995	17	New Orleans, Louisiana	Solved	Murdered by Antoinette Frank, a New Orleans Police officer in the Kim Anh murders.
American Kid's Daycare Center	April 19, 1995	0–5 (3 months)	Oklahoma City, Oklahoma	Solved	Victims of the Oklahoma City bombing.
Stephanie Kuhen	September 17, 1995	3	Los Angeles, California	Solved	
Elisa Izquierdo	November 22, 1995	6	Manhattan, New York	Solved	Died from the abuse inflicted by her mother.
Arnold Fritz	February 2, 1996	14	Moses Lake, Washington	Solved	Victims of the 1996 Frontier Middle School shooting.
Manuel Vela Jr.	February 2, 1996	14	Moses Lake, Washington	Solved	Victims of the 1996 Frontier Middle School shooting.
Roland Avanesian	February 6, 1996	4	Glendale, California	Solved	Murdered alongside their mother Turan Avanesian, by their father, Jorjik Avenesian.
Romik Avanesian	February 6, 1996	6	Glendale, California	Solved	Murdered alongside their mother Turan Avanesian, by their father, Jorjik Avenesian.
Rodric Avanesian	February 6, 1996	8	Glendale, California	Solved	Murdered alongside their mother Turan Avanesian, by their father, Jorjik Avenesian.
Ronika Avanesian	February 6, 1996	9	Glendale, California	Solved	Murdered alongside their mother Turan Avanesian, by their father, Jorjik Avenesian.
Rita Avanesian	February 6, 1996	16	Glendale, California	Solved	Murdered alongside their mother Turan Avanesian, by their father, Jorjik Avenesian.
Roobina Avanesian	February 6, 1996	17	Glendale, California	Solved	Murdered alongside their mother Turan Avanesian, by their father, Jorjik Avenesian.
Damico Watkins	April 25, 1996	17	Madison County, Ohio	Solved	An African-American prisoner and juvenile convict murdered in prison by a white supremacist gang.
Christopher Jacobs	May 9, 1996	1 (16 months)	Coos County, Oregon	Solved	Victims of the Bandon massacre.
Jessica Jacobs	May 9, 1996	5	Coos County, Oregon	Solved	Victims of the Bandon massacre.
Damon Routier	June 6, 1996	5	Rowlett, Texas	Solved	Murdered by their mother in an attempt to stage the murders as a robbery gone wrong. She was only convicted of Damon's death.
Devon Routier	June 6, 1996	6	Rowlett, Texas	Solved	Murdered by their mother in an attempt to stage the murders as a robbery gone wrong. She was only convicted of Damon's death.
DeAnn Emerald Mu'min	November 4, 1996	11	Fort Lauderdale, Florida	Solved	Half-sisters Mu'min and Jones were abducted, raped, and murdered by Howard Ault, who was sentenced to death.
Alicia Sybilla Jones	November 4, 1996	7	Fort Lauderdale, Florida	Solved	Half-sisters Mu'min and Jones were abducted, raped, and murdered by Howard Ault, who was sentenced to death.
JonBenét Ramsey	December 26, 1996	6	Boulder, Colorado	Unsolved	
Amber Creek	February 1997	14	Burlington, Wisconsin	Solved	Subject remained unidentified until 1998.
Sarah Jackson	February 16, 1997	16	Donelson, Tennessee	Solved	Victim of serial killer Paul Dennis Reid. Killed alongside her manager, Steve Hampton.
Megan Storm	March 7, 1997	3	Wheeling, West Virgina	Solved	Murdered by their father.
Jessica Storm	March 7, 1997	8	Wheeling, West Virgina	Solved	Murdered by their father.
Andrea Brown	March 23, 1997	17	Hermitage, Tennessee	Solved	Victim of Paul Dennis Reid. Killed alongside her two coworkers.
Tabitha Lillelid	April 6, 1997	6	Greene County, Tennessee	Solved	Victim of the Lillelid murders.
Michelle Mace	April 23, 1997	16	Clarksville, Tennessee	Solved	Victim of Dennis Paul Reid. Killed alongside her coworker, Angela Holmes.
Joey Alan Pugh	July 20, 1997	11	Cane Creek, Alabama	Solved	Joey Pugh and his father Harold Pugh were murdered by a group of five men during a robbery. Two of the perpetrators were sentenced to death, while the remaining three perpetrators received sentences between 15 years and life in prison.
Shelby Alexis Riggs	November 4, 1997	2	Sherwood, Arkansas	Solved	Murdered by their mother.
Justin Dalton Riggs	November 4, 1997	5	Sherwood, Arkansas	Solved	Murdered by their mother.
Kayla Marie Holton	November 30, 1997	4	Shelbyville, Tennessee	Solved	Murdered by their father.
Eric Holton	November 30, 1997	6	Shelbyville, Tennessee	Solved	Murdered by their father.
Brent Holton	November 30, 1997	10	Shelbyville, Tennessee	Solved	Murdered by their father.
Stephen Holton	November 30, 1997	12	Shelbyville, Tennessee	Solved	Murdered by their father.
Nicole Hadley	December 1, 1997	14	West Paducah, Kentucky	Solved	Victims of the 1997 Heath High School shooting.
Kayce Steger	December 1, 1997	15	West Paducah, Kentucky	Solved	Victims of the 1997 Heath High School shooting.
Jessica James	December 1, 1997	17	West Paducah, Kentucky	Solved	Victims of the 1997 Heath High School shooting.
Brittheny Varner	March 24, 1998	11	Jonesboro, Arkansas	Solved	Victims of the 1998 Westside Middle School shooting.
Natalie Brooks	March 24, 1998	11	Jonesboro, Arkansas	Solved	Victims of the 1998 Westside Middle School shooting.
Paige Ann Herring	March 24, 1998	12	Jonesboro, Arkansas	Solved	Victims of the 1998 Westside Middle School shooting.
Stephanie Johnson	March 24, 1998	12	Jonesboro, Arkansas	Solved	Victims of the 1998 Westside Middle School shooting.
Taylor Sorg	March 25, 1998	3	Pine Bluff, Arkansas	Solved	Sorg children killed alongside their mother and their babysitter, Samantha Rhoades.
Sean Sorg	March 25, 1998	5	Pine Bluff, Arkansas	Solved	Sorg children killed alongside their mother and their babysitter, Samantha Rhoades.
Samantha Rhoades	March 25, 1998	12	Pine Bluff, Arkansas	Solved	Sorg children killed alongside their mother and their babysitter, Samantha Rhoades.
Megan Scherer	March 28, 1998	12	Portageville, Missouri	Solved	Murdered by serial killer and mass murderer, Robert Eugene Brashers.
Ben Walker	May 21, 1998	16	Springfield, Oregon	Solved	Victims of Thurston High School shooting.
Mikael Nickolauson	May 21, 1998	17	Springfield, Oregon	Solved	Victims of Thurston High School shooting.
Christina Marie Williams	June 12, 1998	13	Seaside, California	Solved	
Bobby Whitt	July 29, 1998	10	Concord, North Carolina	Solved	Remained unidentified along with his mother until 2019.
Tang Kee Hang	September 3, 1998	5	St. Paul, Minnesota	Solved	Murdered by their mother.
A-ee Hang	September 3, 1998	6	St. Paul, Minnesota	Solved	Murdered by their mother.
Tang Long Hang	September 3, 1998	7	St. Paul, Minnesota	Solved	Murdered by their mother.
Nali Hang	September 3, 1998	8	St. Paul, Minnesota	Solved	Murdered by their mother.
Samson Hang	September 3, 1998	9	St. Paul, Minnesota	Solved	Murdered by their mother.
Koua Eai Hang	September 3, 1998	11	St. Paul, Minnesota	Solved	Murdered by their mother.
Amanda Victoria Brown	September 11, 1998	7	Tampa, Florida	Solved, but body never found	Brown was abducted, raped, and murdered in 1998. The perpetrator, Willie Crain Jr., was found guilty of murder and sentenced to death in 1999.
Geoffrey Flaherty	September 11, 1998	9	Crestview, Florida	Solved	Murdered alongside their mother by their mother's boyfriend, who was sentenced to death and executed in 2025.
Amanda Flaherty	September 11, 1998	7	Crestview, Florida	Solved	Murdered alongside their mother by their mother's boyfriend, who was sentenced to death and executed in 2025.
Logan Flaherty	September 11, 1998	4	Crestview, Florida	Solved	Murdered alongside their mother by their mother's boyfriend, who was sentenced to death and executed in 2025.
Keenan Andre O'Mailia	April 17, 1999	6	North Augusta, South Carolina	Solved	Raped and murdered in 1999. Perpetrator was sentenced to death and executed in 2006 after waiving his appeals.
Steven Curnow	April 20, 1999	14	Columbine, Colorado	Solved	Victims of the Columbine High School massacre. Killed alongside two 18-year-old students, a teacher, and one victim who succumbed to her injuries in 2025.
Daniel Mauser	April 20, 1999	15	Columbine, Colorado	Solved	Victims of the Columbine High School massacre. Killed alongside two 18-year-old students, a teacher, and one victim who succumbed to her injuries in 2025.
Daniel Rohrbough	April 20, 1999	15	Columbine, Colorado	Solved	Victims of the Columbine High School massacre. Killed alongside two 18-year-old students, a teacher, and one victim who succumbed to her injuries in 2025.
Kelly Fleming	April 20, 1999	16	Columbine, Colorado	Solved	Victims of the Columbine High School massacre. Killed alongside two 18-year-old students, a teacher, and one victim who succumbed to her injuries in 2025.
John Tomlin	April 20, 1999	16	Columbine, Colorado	Solved	Victims of the Columbine High School massacre. Killed alongside two 18-year-old students, a teacher, and one victim who succumbed to her injuries in 2025.
Matthew Kechter	April 20, 1999	16	Columbine, Colorado	Solved	Victims of the Columbine High School massacre. Killed alongside two 18-year-old students, a teacher, and one victim who succumbed to her injuries in 2025.
Kyle Velasquez	April 20, 1999	16	Columbine, Colorado	Solved	Victims of the Columbine High School massacre. Killed alongside two 18-year-old students, a teacher, and one victim who succumbed to her injuries in 2025.
Corey DePooter	April 20, 1999	17	Columbine, Colorado	Solved	Victims of the Columbine High School massacre. Killed alongside two 18-year-old students, a teacher, and one victim who succumbed to her injuries in 2025.
Rachel Scott	April 20, 1999	17	Columbine, Colorado	Solved	Victims of the Columbine High School massacre. Killed alongside two 18-year-old students, a teacher, and one victim who succumbed to her injuries in 2025.
Cassie Bernall	April 20, 1999	17	Columbine, Colorado	Solved	Victims of the Columbine High School massacre. Killed alongside two 18-year-old students, a teacher, and one victim who succumbed to her injuries in 2025.
Brandon Wiener	May 3, 1999	3	Costa Mesa, California	Solved	Victims of the Costa Mesa school car attack.
Sierra Soto	May 3, 1999	4	Costa Mesa, California	Solved	Victims of the Costa Mesa school car attack.
Jonah Silk	June 10, 1999	1	Hartford, Connecticut	Solved	Murdered alongside their father Charles Silk, by their mother.
Jennifer Silk	June 10, 1999	3	Hartford, Connecticut	Solved	Murdered alongside their father Charles Silk, by their mother.
Rebecca Gonzales	June 22, 1999	10	Castle Rock, Colorado	Solved	Murdered by their father.
Katheryn Gonzales	June 22, 1999	8	Castle Rock, Colorado	Solved	Murdered by their father.
Leslie Gonzales	June 22, 1999	7	Castle Rock, Colorado	Solved	Murdered by their father.
Mychelle Barton	July 29, 1999	8	Atlanta, Georgia	Solved	Victims of the Atlanta day trading shootings. Murdered by their father alongside their mother before he went on his killing spree.
Matthew David Barton	July 29, 1999	11	Atlanta, Georgia	Solved	Victims of the Atlanta day trading shootings. Murdered by their father alongside their mother before he went on his killing spree.
Kristi Beckel	September 15, 1999	14	Fort Worth, Texas.	Solved	Victims of the Wedgeworth Baptist Church shooting.
Joseph Ennis	September 15, 1999	14	Fort Worth, Texas.	Solved	Victims of the Wedgeworth Baptist Church shooting.
Cassandra Griffin	September 15, 1999	14	Fort Worth, Texas.	Solved	Victims of the Wedgeworth Baptist Church shooting.
Justin Ray	September 15, 1999	17	Fort Worth, Texas.	Solved	Victims of the Wedgeworth Baptist Church shooting.
Jesse Dirkhising	September 26, 1999	13	Rogers, Arkansas	Solved	Controversial murder case.
Ashley Cook	October 11, 1999	12	Warren, Ohio	Solved	One of the three confirmed victims of serial killer Stanley Theodore Adams.
Pamela Irene Butler	October 12, 1999	10	Grain Valley, Missouri	Solved	Abducted from her home in Kansas and taken across state lines to Missouri, where she was raped and murdered. Perpetrator was sentenced to death and executed by the federal government in 2020.
Lauria Bible	December 29–30, 1999	16	Welch, Oklahoma	Solved	Originally a missing persons case. Solved in 2018.
Ashley Freeman	December 29–30, 1999	16	Welch, Oklahoma	Solved	Originally a missing persons case. Solved in 2018.

== 21st century ==
=== 2000s ===
Victim(s)	Date of death	Age	Location	Status	Description
Roberto Jimenez	March 20, 2000	15	Irving, Texas	Solved	Perpetrator was sentenced to death and executed.
Elizabeth Reiser	May 24, 2000	17	New Philadelphia, Ohio	Solved	Kidnapped and murdered.
Molly Bish	c. June 27, 2000	16	Warren, Massachusetts	Unsolved	
Nicholas Markowitz	August 9, 2000	15	Los Angeles, California	Solved	Murdered over a drug feud.
Samuel Malik Harris Jr.	December 28, 2000	15	Philadelphia, Pennsylvania	Solved	Victim of the Lex Street massacre.
Brittney Fisher	April 10, 2001	12	Scottsdale, Arizona	Unsolved	Children of FBI Top Ten Most Wanted fugitive Robert William Fisher.
Bobby Fisher	April 10, 2001	10	Scottsdale, Arizona	Unsolved	Children of FBI Top Ten Most Wanted fugitive Robert William Fisher.
Mary Battaglia	May 2, 2001	9	Dallas, Texas	Solved	Killed by their father.
Liberty Battaglia	May 2, 2001	6	Dallas, Texas	Solved	Killed by their father.
Mary Yates	June 20, 2001	6 months	Clear Lake City, Texas	Solved	Killed by their mother during a psychotic episode.
Luke Yates	June 20, 2001	2	Clear Lake City, Texas	Solved	Killed by their mother during a psychotic episode.
Paul Yates	June 20, 2001	3	Clear Lake City, Texas	Solved	Killed by their mother during a psychotic episode.
John Yates	June 20, 2001	5	Clear Lake City, Texas	Solved	Killed by their mother during a psychotic episode.
Noah Yates	June 20, 2001	7	Clear Lake City, Texas	Solved	Killed by their mother during a psychotic episode.
Stacy Payne	July 11, 2001	15	Spencer County, Indiana,	Solved	Murdered in home invasion.
Tatyana Kukhariskiy	August 20, 2001	9	Sacramento, California	Solved	Murdered alongside their parents by their uncle.
Dimitriy Kukhariskiy	August 20, 2001	10	Sacramento, California	Solved	Murdered alongside their parents by their uncle.
Sergay Soltys	August 21, 2001	3	Sacramento, California	Solved	Murdered by his father.
Michael Aguilar	August 27–28, 2001	6	Sioux City, Iowa	Solved	Murdered by their mother's boyfriend.
Lisa Aguilar	August 27–28, 2001	7	Sioux City, Iowa	Solved	Murdered by their mother's boyfriend.
Larry Aguilar	August 27–28, 2001	9	Sioux City, Iowa	Solved	Murdered by their mother's boyfriend.
Zach Aguilar	August 27–28, 2001	11	Sioux City, Iowa	Solved	Murdered by their mother's boyfriend.
Claudia Aguilar	August 27–28, 2001	12	Sioux City, Iowa	Solved	Murdered by their mother's boyfriend.
Christine Lee Hanson	September 11, 2001	2	Lower Manhattan, New York	Solved	Victims of the hijacked United Airlines Flight 175 during the September 11 attacks.
David Gamboa	September 11, 2001	3	Lower Manhattan, New York	Solved	Victims of the hijacked United Airlines Flight 175 during the September 11 attacks.
Juliana McCourt	September 11, 2001	4	Lower Manhattan, New York	Solved	Victims of the hijacked United Airlines Flight 175 during the September 11 attacks.
Dana Falkenburg	September 11, 2001	3	Arlington County, Virginia	Solved	Victims of the hijacked American Airlines Flight 77 during the September 11 attacks.
Zoe Falkenburg	September 11, 2001	8	Arlington County, Virginia	Solved	Victims of the hijacked American Airlines Flight 77 during the September 11 attacks.
Asia Cottom	September 11, 2001	11	Arlington County, Virginia	Solved	Victims of the hijacked American Airlines Flight 77 during the September 11 attacks.
Bernard Curtis Brown ll	September 11, 2001	11	Arlington County, Virginia	Solved	Victims of the hijacked American Airlines Flight 77 during the September 11 attacks.
Rodney Dickens	September 11, 2001	11	Arlington County, Virginia	Solved	Victims of the hijacked American Airlines Flight 77 during the September 11 attacks.
Laree Slack	November 11, 2001	12	Chicago, Illinois	Solved	Killed from abuse by her parents
Esmeralda Alvarado	January 18, 2002	15	Houstan, Texas	Solved	Victim of the 2002 East End murders.
Danielle van Dam	c. February 2002	7	Sabre Springs, California	Solved	Murdered by her neighbor.
Kimberly Pittman	April 11, 2002	13	Savanah, Georgia	Solved	Murdered alongside her mother, Susan Pittman.
Brett Bowyer	April 18, 2002	12	Russell County, Alabama	Solved	Kidnapped alongside his father and murdered. His father was the sole survivor.
Cody Sharon	August 23, 2002	6	Warsaw, Kentucky	Solved	Perpetrator executed in 2008.
Chelbi Sharon	August 23, 2002	7	Warsaw, Kentucky	Solved	Perpetrator executed in 2008.
Gwen Araujo	October 4, 2002	17	Newark, California	Solved	Victim of gender-related hate crime.
Kacie Woody	December 4, 2002	13	Conway, Arkansas	Solved	The first well-documented case of child murder from an online predator. She initially met the 47-year-old perpetrator (posing as a teen), in a Yahoo! Messenger Christian chat room for teens. The perpetrator murdered Woody and then killed himself.
Craig Sorger	February 15, 2003	13	Ephrata, Washington	Solved	Murdered by his two friends, also minors.
Julissa Quesada	March 11, 2003	3	Brownsville, Texas	Solved	Victims of the 2003 Brownsville child murders. The mother of the victims, Angela Camacho, was sentenced to life imprisonment while her common-law husband John Allen Rubio (biological father of Mary Jane) was sentenced to death.
Mary Jane Rubio	March 11, 2003	0 (2 months)	Brownsville, Texas	Solved	Victims of the 2003 Brownsville child murders. The mother of the victims, Angela Camacho, was sentenced to life imprisonment while her common-law husband John Allen Rubio (biological father of Mary Jane) was sentenced to death.
John E. Rubio	March 11, 2003	1	Brownsville, Texas	Solved	Victims of the 2003 Brownsville child murders. The mother of the victims, Angela Camacho, was sentenced to life imprisonment while her common-law husband John Allen Rubio (biological father of Mary Jane) was sentenced to death.
Sakia Gunn	May 11, 2003	15	Newark, New Jersey	Solved	Victim of sexuality-related hate crime.
Sedona Wesson	March 12, 2004	1	Fresno, California	Solved	Murdered by their father.
Jeva Wesson	March 12, 2004	1	Fresno, California	Solved	Murdered by their father.
Marshey Wesson	March 12, 2004	1	Fresno, California	Solved	Murdered by their father.
Ethan Wesson	March 12, 2004	4	Fresno, California	Solved	Murdered by their father.
Johnathan Wesson	March 12, 2004	7	Fresno, California	Solved	Murdered by their father.
Aviv Wesson	March 12, 2004	7	Fresno, California	Solved	Murdered by their father.
Illabelle Wesson	March 12, 2004	8	Fresno, California	Solved	Murdered by their father.
Elizabeth Wesson	March 12, 2004	17	Fresno, California	Solved	Murdered by their father.
Ashley Hurt	June 4, 2004	1	Midlothian, Illinois	Solved	Perpetrator was sentenced to 50 years imprisonment.
Riley Fox	June 6, 2004	3	Wilmington, Illinois	Solved	Perpetrator confessed to crime in 2010.
Marcela Hope Yellowbear	July 2, 2004	1	Riverton, Wyoming	Solved	Victim was tortured to death by her father. Perpetrator was convicted in April 2006 and subsequently sentenced to life in prison.
Jonathan Gleason	August 6, 2004	17	Deltona, Florida	Solved	Victim of the Deltona massacre.
Bart Jameson Oliver	March 12, 2005	15	Brookfield, Wisconsin	Solved	Victims of the Living Church of God Shooting.
James Isaac Gregory	March 12, 2005	16	Brookfield, Wisconsin	Solved	Victims of the Living Church of God Shooting.
Alicia White	March 21, 2005	15	Red Lake, Minnesota	Solved	Victims of the Red Lake shootings.
Thurlene Stillday	March 21, 2005	15	Red Lake, Minnesota	Solved	Victims of the Red Lake shootings.
Chanelle Rosebear	March 21, 2005	15	Red Lake, Minnesota	Solved	Victims of the Red Lake shootings.
Chase Lussier	March 21, 2005	15	Red Lake, Minnesota	Solved	Victims of the Red Lake shootings.
Dewayne Lewis	March 21, 2005	15	Red Lake, Minnesota	Solved	Victims of the Red Lake shootings.
Paris Talley	August 30, 2005	0 (1 month old)	Dayton, Ohio	Solved	Murdered by her mother. She was placed in a microwave where she was murdered.
Atcel Olmedo	September 2005	2	Naperville, Illinois	Unsolved	The suspects, the victim's parents, vanished when their remaining children were taken into protective custody.
Lillian Entwistle	January 20, 2006	0 (9 months)	Hopkinton, Massachusetts	Solved	Murdered alongside her mother by her father.
Melissa Moore	March 25, 2006	14	Capitol Hill, Washington State	Solved	Victims of the Capitol Hill massacre
Suzanne Thorne	March 25, 2006	15	Capitol Hill, Washington State	Solved	Victims of the Capitol Hill massacre
Katie McCarron	May 13, 2006	3	Morton, Illinois	Solved	Victim was suffocated with a trash bag by her mother.
Marcus Fiesel	August 3–4, 2006	3	Union Township, Ohio	Solved	Suffered abuse at the hands of his foster parents resulting in his murder after being placed in a cabinet and dying of hypothermia.
West Nickel Mines School shooting	October 2, 2006	6–13	Nickel Mines, Pennsylvania	Solved	Victims of West Nickel Mines School shooting.
Luis Julian Escobedo	October 13, 2006	4	Florida's Turnpike, Florida	Solved	The boys and their parents were murdered in a fatal carjacking committed by Ricardo Sanchez Jr. and Daniel Troya, who were both initially sentenced to death by the federal government before their sentences were commuted to life without parole.
Luis Damien Escobedo	October 13, 2006	3	Florida's Turnpike, Florida	Solved	The boys and their parents were murdered in a fatal carjacking committed by Ricardo Sanchez Jr. and Daniel Troya, who were both initially sentenced to death by the federal government before their sentences were commuted to life without parole.
Kirsten Hinckley	February 12, 2007	15	Salt Lake City, Utah	Solved	Victim of the Trolley Square shooting. Perpetrator killed on site by police.
Erika Hill	February 25, 2007	15	Fitchburg, Wisconsin	Solved	Victim remained unidentified until 2015.
Kevin Haines	May 12, 2007	16	Manheim Township, Pennsylvania	Solved	Killed alongside his parents by a friend and classmate.
Rebekah Smallwood	May 29, 2007	2	Fort Campbell, Kentucky	Solved	Murdered by their mother in an attempt to murder her husband to collect his insurance money.
Sam Fagan	May 29, 2007	9	Fort Campbell, Kentucky	Solved	Murdered by their mother in an attempt to murder her husband to collect his insurance money.
Magaly Frayre	May 29, 2007	1	Hudson Oaks, Texas	Solved	Murdered by their mother.
Yaneth Frayre	May 29, 2007	3	Hudson Oaks, Texas	Solved	Murdered by their mother.
Maria Teresa Estrada	May 29, 2007	5	Hudson Oaks, Texas	Solved	Murdered by their mother.
Daniel Benoit	June 22, 2007	7	Fayetteville, Georgia	Solved	Murdered by his father, WWE star Chris Benoit, who committed suicide 2 days later.
Aja Fogle	c. Summer, 2007	5	Washington D.C	Solved	Murdered by their mother.
N'Kiah Fogle	c. Summer, 2007	6	Washington D.C	Solved	Murdered by their mother.
Tatianna Jacks	c. Summer, 2007	11	Washington D.C	Solved	Murdered by their mother.
Brittany Jacks	c. Summer, 2007	17	Washington D.C	Solved	Murdered by their mother.
Ian Williams	August 7, 2007	3	Rowland Heights, California	Solved	Murdered alongside their father, by their mother.
Devon Williams	August 7, 2007	7	Rowland Heights, California	Solved	Murdered alongside their father, by their mother.
Brandon Hebert	August 20, 2007	7	Matthews, Louisiana	Solved	Murdered by their mother.
Camille Hebert	August 20, 2007	9	Matthews, Louisiana	Solved	Murdered by their mother.
Crandon, Wisconsin shooting	October 7, 2007	14–17	Crandon, Wisconsin	Solved	Victims of the Crandon, Wisconsin shooting.
Rowan Ford	November 3, 2007	9	Stella, Missouri	Solved	Raped and murdered in 1999. Perpetrator was sentenced to death and executed in 2024.
Rachel Works	December 9, 2007	16	Colorado Springs, Colorado	Solved	Killed alongside her older sister in the 2007 Colorado YWAM and New Life shootings.
Nathan Anderson	December 24, 2007	3	Carnation, Washington	Solved	Victims of the 2007 Carnation murders. Killed alongside their parents and grandparents.
Olivia Anderson	December 24, 2007	5	Carnation, Washington	Solved	Victims of the 2007 Carnation murders. Killed alongside their parents and grandparents.
Alijah Mullis	January 29, 2008	0 (3 months)	Galveston County, Texas	Solved	Perpetrator, the victim's father, was found guilty and sentenced to death in 2011. He was executed in September 2024.
Matthew Caffey	March 1, 2008	13	Alba, Texas	Solved	Orchestrated by their 16-year-old sister. Currently serving a life sentence with possibility of parole.
Tyler Caffey	March 1, 2008	8	Alba, Texas	Solved	Orchestrated by their 16-year-old sister. Currently serving a life sentence with possibility of parole.
Jamiel Shaw II	March 2, 2008	17	Los Angeles, California	Solved	Shot while walking home.
Eleanor Sueppel	March 23, 2008	3	Iowa City, Iowa	Solved	Murdered alongside their adoptive mother, Sheryl Sueppel by their adoptive father.
Mira Sueppel	March 23, 2008	5	Iowa City, Iowa	Solved	Murdered alongside their adoptive mother, Sheryl Sueppel by their adoptive father.
Seth Sueppel	March 23, 2008	9	Iowa City, Iowa	Solved	Murdered alongside their adoptive mother, Sheryl Sueppel by their adoptive father.
Ethan Sueppel	March 23, 2008	10	Iowa City, Iowa	Solved	Murdered alongside their adoptive mother, Sheryl Sueppel by their adoptive father.
Matthew Bologna	June 22, 2008	16	San Francisco, California	Solved	Killed along with his father and older brother in case of mistaken identity. He was the youngest victim.
Brittney Gary	c. November 2, 2008	17	Jennings, Louisiana	Unsolved	Presumed victim of unidentified serial killer.
Amanda Collette	November 13, 2008	15	Fort Lauderdale, Florida	Solved	Murdered for rejecting a fellow student's sexual advances.
Micheal Andre Ortiz	December 24, 2008	17	Covina, California	Solved	Youngest victim of the Covina massacre.
Corrine Gracy Myers	March 10, 2009	1	Geneva County, Alabama	Solved	Victims of the Geneva County shootings. Perpetrator died from self-inflicted gun wound during manhunt.
Dean James Wise	March 10, 2009	15	Geneva County, Alabama	Solved	Victims of the Geneva County shootings. Perpetrator died from self-inflicted gun wound during manhunt.
Catherine Parente	April 20, 2009	11	Townson, Maryland	Solved	Murdered alongside her older sister and mother by their father.
Brisenia Flores	May 30, 2009	9	Arivaca, Arizona	Solved	Three home invaders were found guilty for their involvement in the shooting and murder of Brisenia Flores and her father.
Emma Niederbrock	September 2009	16	Farmville, Virginia	Solved	Victim of the Farmville murders.
Morgan Damas	September 18, 2009	1 (19 months)	Collier County, Florida	Solved	Murdered alongside their mother by their father.
Megan Damas	September 18, 2009	3	Collier County, Florida	Solved	Murdered alongside their mother by their father.
Marven Damas	September 18, 2009	5	Collier County, Florida	Solved	Murdered alongside their mother by their father.
Maven Damas	September 18, 2009	6	Collier County, Florida	Solved	Murdered alongside their mother by their father.
Meshach Damas	September 18, 2009	9	Collier County, Florida	Solved	Murdered alongside their mother by their father.
Derrion Albert	September 24, 2009	16	Chicago, Illinois	Solved	Perpetrators were caught on videotape brutally beating Albert with a railroad tie. Five perpetrators were convicted for his death.
Shaniya Nicole Davis	November 10, 2009	5	Fayetteville, North Carolina	Solved	Davis's mother was sentenced to 17 years in prison for second-degree murder and selling her daughter to pay off a drug debt, while her accomplice was sentenced to death for murdering Shaniya.

=== 2010s ===
Victim(s)	Date of death	Age	Location	Status	Description
Gianni McStay	February 4, 2010	4	Fallbrook, California	Solved	Perpetrator found guilty in 2019 and was sentenced to death in 2020.
Joseph McStay	February 4, 2010	3	Fallbrook, California	Solved	Perpetrator found guilty in 2019 and was sentenced to death in 2020.
Lydia Schatz	February 6, 2010	7	Paradise, California	Solved	Perpetrators, Schatz's adoptive parents, found guilty in 2011.
Mackenzie Cowell	February 9, 2010	17	Wenatchee, Washington	Solved	Perpetrator accepted plea deal in 2012, though has since recanted.
Baby A	February 18, 2010	0	Philadelphia, Pennsylvania	Solved	Babies illegally aborted by serial killer Kermit Gosnell.
Baby C	February 18, 2010	0	Philadelphia, Pennsylvania	Solved	Babies illegally aborted by serial killer Kermit Gosnell.
Baby D	February 18, 2010	0	Philadelphia, Pennsylvania	Solved	Babies illegally aborted by serial killer Kermit Gosnell.
DeBlase children murders	March 4, 2010 – June 20, 2010	3–4	Alabama	Solved	Both perpetrators were sentenced to death for capital murder.
Lorenzo González Cacho	March 9, 2010	8	Dorado, Puerto Rico	Unsolved	Case became notorious for gossip show SuperXclusivo's coverage along with other factors interrupting the investigation.
Alyssa Lynch	April 9, 2010	8	Evansville, Indiana	Solved	Perpetrator found guilty and was sentenced to death in 2013.
Caleb Lynch	April 9, 2010	5	Evansville, Indiana	Solved	Perpetrator found guilty and was sentenced to death in 2013.
Lexis Roberts	September 10, 2010	12	Catahoula Parish, Louisiana	Solved	Kidnapped and murdered by Thomas Steven Sanders, who was originally sentenced to death under federal law for kidnapping resulting in death, before the sentence was commuted to life.
Zahra Baker	September 24, 2010	10	Hickory, North Carolina	Solved	Perpetrator found guilty of second-degree murder in 2011.
Phylicia Barnes	December 2010	16	Baltimore, Maryland	Unsolved	Barnes went missing in December 2010, and her body was found in the Susquehanna River in April 2011.
Christina-Taylor Green	January 8, 2011	9	Tucson, Arizona	Solved	Perpetrator sentenced November 8, 2012.
Ryan Bennett	January 21, 2011	4	Austin, Indiana	Solved	Murdered by their mother.
Katelynn Bennett	January 21, 2011	9	Austin, Indiana	Solved	Murdered by their mother.
Jasmine Abbott	January 21, 2011	14	Austin, Indiana	Solved	Murdered by their mother.
Calyx Schenecker	January 27, 2011	16	Tampa, Florida	Solved	Perpetrator found guilty of first-degree murder in 2014.
Beau Schenecker	January 27, 2011	13	Tampa, Florida	Solved	Perpetrator found guilty of first-degree murder in 2014.
Seath Tyler Jackson	April 17, 2011	15	Summerfield, Florida	Solved	Murdered by a group of youths after his girlfriend lured him into a house.
Hana Grace-Rose Williams	May 12, 2011	13	Sedro-Woolley, Washington	Solved	Perpetrators charged in 2013, one convicted of manslaughter and the other convicted of "homicide by abuse".
Leiby Kletzky	July 11, 2011	8	Brooklyn, New York City, New York	Solved	Perpetrator charged with second-degree murder and second-degree kidnapping after a plea deal in 2012.
Ame Lynn Deal	July 12, 2011	10	Phoenix, Arizona	Solved	Four perpetrators were charged with several counts of child abuse, and two of the perpetrators were charged with first degree murder.
Scott Dieter	August 7, 2011	11	Copley Township, Ohio	Solved	Perpetrator killed onsite by police.
Amelia Shambaugh	August 7, 2011	16	Copley Township, Ohio	Solved	Perpetrator killed onsite by police.
Autumn Johnson	August 7, 2011	16	Copley Township, Ohio	Solved	Perpetrator killed onsite by police.
Hanna Leigh Suttles	November 20, 2011	8	Gulliford County, North Carolina	Solved	Murdered by Mary Ann Holder. Mary Ann was the mother to Zack and Robert and the Aunt to Richard and Hanna. Makayla was the Girlfriend of Robert.
Zack Smith	November 20, 2011	14	Gulliford County, North Carolina	Solved	Murdered by Mary Ann Holder. Mary Ann was the mother to Zack and Robert and the Aunt to Richard and Hanna. Makayla was the Girlfriend of Robert.
Makayla Woods	November 20, 2011	15	Gulliford County, North Carolina	Solved	Murdered by Mary Ann Holder. Mary Ann was the mother to Zack and Robert and the Aunt to Richard and Hanna. Makayla was the Girlfriend of Robert.
Richard Suttles	November 20, 2011	17	Gulliford County, North Carolina	Solved	Murdered by Mary Ann Holder. Mary Ann was the mother to Zack and Robert and the Aunt to Richard and Hanna. Makayla was the Girlfriend of Robert.
Robert Smith	November 20, 2011	17	Gulliford County, North Carolina	Solved	Murdered by Mary Ann Holder. Mary Ann was the mother to Zack and Robert and the Aunt to Richard and Hanna. Makayla was the Girlfriend of Robert.
Erica Parsons	December 17, 2011	13	Salisbury, North Carolina	Solved	Perpetrators charged in 2019.
Charles Powell	February 12, 2012	7	South Hill, Washington	Solved	Murder–suicide.
Braden Powell	February 12, 2012	5	South Hill, Washington	Solved	Murder–suicide.
Skylar Neese	July 6, 2012	16	Wayne Township, Pennsylvania	Solved	Two perpetrators convicted in 2014. Neese was from West Virginia, and West Virginia signed into law Skylar's Law in response to the case. Skylar's Law modified Amber Alerts in West Virginia to issue an Amber Alert in cases where a child is missing but not suspected to be kidnapped.
Cecilia Schaffhausen	July 10, 2012	5	River Falls, Wisconsin	Solved	Murdered by their father following his divorce from their mother.
Sophie Schaffhausen	July 10, 2012	8	River Falls, Wisconsin	Solved	Murdered by their father following his divorce from their mother.
Amara Schaffhausen	July 10, 2012	11	River Falls, Wisconsin	Solved	Murdered by their father following his divorce from their mother.
Veronica Moser-Sullivan	July 20, 2012	6	Aurora, Colorado	Solved	Victim of the 2012 Aurora theater shooting.
Jessica Ridgeway	October 5, 2012	10	Westminster, Colorado	Solved	
Lucia Krim	October 25, 2012	6	Manhattan, New York City, New York	Solved	Perpetrator, the children's caregiver, convicted in 2018. Governor Cuomo signed into law Lulu & Leo's Law in response to the case. The law makes it a crime to knowingly misrepresent the qualifications of someone applying to be a caregiver.
Leo Krim	October 25, 2012	2	Manhattan, New York City, New York	Solved	Perpetrator, the children's caregiver, convicted in 2018. Governor Cuomo signed into law Lulu & Leo's Law in response to the case. The law makes it a crime to knowingly misrepresent the qualifications of someone applying to be a caregiver.
Nicholas Brady	November 22, 2012	17	Little Falls, Minnesota	Solved	Perpetrator hid in basement lying in wait for suspected burglars, the victims Kifer and Brady. After neutralizing the two teens, the perpetrator proceeded to taunt and kill them. Perpetrator was charged with premeditated first-degree murder in 2013.
Sandy Hook Elementary School shooting	December 14, 2012	6–7	Newtown, Connecticut	Solved	Murder–suicide.
Angelina Griego	January 19, 2013	2	South Valley, New Mexico	Solved	Victims of the 2013 South Valley homicides.
Jael Griego	January 19, 2013	5	South Valley, New Mexico	Solved	Victims of the 2013 South Valley homicides.
Zephaniah Griego	January 19, 2013	9	South Valley, New Mexico	Solved	Victims of the 2013 South Valley homicides.
Hadiya Pendleton	January 29, 2013	15	Chicago, Illinois	Solved	Two perpetrators were found guilty in 2018. Pendleton had performed with her school at the inauguration of Barack Obama, and Michelle Obama attended her funeral service.
Antonio Santiago	March 21, 2013	1	Brunswick, Georgia	Solved	Perpetrator found guilty and sentenced to life without parole in September 2013.
Martin W. Richard	April 15, 2013	8	Boston, Massachusetts	Solved	Victim of the Boston Marathon bombing.
Gabriel Fernandez	May 24, 2013	8	Palmdale, California	Solved	One perpetrator plead guilty in February 2018 and received a life sentence without possibility of parole. The other perpetrator plead not guilty, but he was found guilty of first-degree murder with circumstances of torture. The second perpetrator received the death penalty in December 2017, but since California does not currently allow capital punishment, his execution date remains undetermined.
Cherish Perrywinkle	June 21, 2013	8	Orlando, Florida	Solved	Perpetrator found guilty of first-degree murder and sexual battery and was sentenced to death in May 2018.
Priscilla Perez	July 26, 2013	17	Hialeah, Florida	Solved	Victim of the 2013 Hialeah shooting.
Ethan Anderson	August 3, 2013	8	Boulevard, California	Solved	
Alexis Murphy	August 3, 2013	17	Lovingston, Virginia	Solved	Perpetrator found guilty and given two life sentences in 2014.
Joshua Broussard	September 4, 2013	17	Spring, Texas	Solved	Victim of the Spring High School stabbing.
William Zhuo	October 26, 2013	1	Brooklyn, New York	Solved	Perpetrator pled guilty and was sentenced to life in prison in 2015.
Kevin Zhuo	October 26, 2013	5	Brooklyn, New York	Solved	Perpetrator pled guilty and was sentenced to life in prison in 2015.
Amy Zhuo	October 26, 2013	7	Brooklyn, New York	Solved	Perpetrator pled guilty and was sentenced to life in prison in 2015.
Linda Zhuo	October 26, 2013	9	Brooklyn, New York	Solved	Perpetrator pled guilty and was sentenced to life in prison in 2015.
Emani Moss	October 28, 2013	10	Lawrenceville, Georgia	Solved	Perpetrator was found guilty and sentenced to death in 2019.
Garnett Spears	January 23, 2014	5	Valhalla, New York	Solved	Perpetrator charged with first-degree murder and second-degree manslaughter in 2015.
Hailey Owens	February 18, 2014	10	Springfield, Missouri	Solved	The perpetrator was found guilty in November 2017 and sentenced to death in January 2018.
Reat Underwood	April 13, 2014	14	Overland Park, Kansas	Solved	Victim of 2014 Overland Park shootings. Perpetrator was convicted and sentenced to death in 2016, but died on May 3, 2021.
6 newborn babies	April 13, 2014	0	Pleasant Grove, Utah	Solved	Serial killings committed by their own mother, Megan Huntsman who strangled them and smothered them. One was stillborn. Genders were identified as 5 females and 2 males. Investigators estimate the period of killings between 1996 and 2006.
Felecia Nicole Williams	May 16, 2014	9	Tampa, Florida	Solved	Child rape and murder victim. Perpetrator was convicted and sentenced to death in 2020.
Janaya Makayia Thompson	July 16, 2014	5	Gulfport, Mississippi	Solved	Child rape and murder victim. The killer, Alberto Julio Garcia, pleaded guilty to capital murder and sentenced to death in 2017.
Zachary Stay	July 19, 2014	4	Harris County, Texas	Solved	Victims of the 2014 Harris County shooting.
Rebecca Stay	July 19, 2014	6	Harris County, Texas	Solved	Victims of the 2014 Harris County shooting.
Emily Stay	July 19, 2014	9	Harris County, Texas	Solved	Victims of the 2014 Harris County shooting.
Bryan Stay	July 19, 2014	13	Harris County, Texas	Solved	Victims of the 2014 Harris County shooting.
Elaine Jones	August 28, 2014	1	Lexington County, South Carolina	Solved	Perpetrator killed his five children after picking them up from school and daycare. In 2019, the perpetrator was found guilty and sentenced to death.
Gabriel Jones	August 28, 2014	2	Lexington County, South Carolina	Solved	Perpetrator killed his five children after picking them up from school and daycare. In 2019, the perpetrator was found guilty and sentenced to death.
Nahtahn Jones	August 28, 2014	6	Lexington County, South Carolina	Solved	Perpetrator killed his five children after picking them up from school and daycare. In 2019, the perpetrator was found guilty and sentenced to death.
Elias Jones	August 28, 2014	7	Lexington County, South Carolina	Solved	Perpetrator killed his five children after picking them up from school and daycare. In 2019, the perpetrator was found guilty and sentenced to death.
Merah Jones	August 28, 2014	8	Lexington County, South Carolina	Solved	Perpetrator killed his five children after picking them up from school and daycare. In 2019, the perpetrator was found guilty and sentenced to death.
Eddy Chen	October 8, 2014	7	Guilderland, New York	Unsolved	Victims of the 2014 Chen family killings.
Anthony Chen	October 8, 2014	10	Guilderland, New York	Unsolved	Victims of the 2014 Chen family killings.
Laquan McDonald	October 20, 2014	17	Chicago, Illinois	Solved	Victim of police violence. Perpetrator was found guilty of second-degree murder and 16 counts of aggravated battery with a firearm in 2018. He was sentenced to 81 months in prison in January 2018, and he was released on parole for good behavior in February 2022.
Shaylee Chuckulnaskit	October 24, 2014	14	Marysville, Washington	Solved	Victims of the 2014 Marysville Pilchuck High School shooting. Perpetrator died from a self-inflicted gun wound.
Zoë Galasso	October 24, 2014	14	Marysville, Washington	Solved	Victims of the 2014 Marysville Pilchuck High School shooting. Perpetrator died from a self-inflicted gun wound.
Gia Soriano	October 24, 2014	14	Marysville, Washington	Solved	Victims of the 2014 Marysville Pilchuck High School shooting. Perpetrator died from a self-inflicted gun wound.
Andrew Fryberg	October 24, 2014	15	Marysville, Washington	Solved	Victims of the 2014 Marysville Pilchuck High School shooting. Perpetrator died from a self-inflicted gun wound.
Nina Flick	December 15, 2014	14	Montgomery County, Pennsylvania	Solved	Victim of the 2014 Montgomery County shootings. Perpetrator died from a suicidal overdose during his manhunt.
Philip Savvas Savopoulos	May 14, 2015	10	Washington, D.C.	Solved	Victim of the D.C. mansion murders. Perpetrator was found guilty in October 2018 and sentenced to four life terms in prison without the possibility of parole in February 2019.
Bella Bond	June 2015	2	Boston, Massachusetts	Solved	Victim remained unidentified until September 2015.
Daniel Bever	July 22, 2015	12	Broken Arrow, Oklahoma	Solved	Perpetrators arrested after survivor, Crystal Bever, identified her two brothers, Robert Bever and Michael Bever, as the assailants.
Christopher Bever	July 22, 2015	10	Broken Arrow, Oklahoma	Solved	Perpetrators arrested after survivor, Crystal Bever, identified her two brothers, Robert Bever and Michael Bever, as the assailants.
Victoria Bever	July 22, 2015	5	Broken Arrow, Oklahoma	Solved	Perpetrators arrested after survivor, Crystal Bever, identified her two brothers, Robert Bever and Michael Bever, as the assailants.
Madyson Middleton	July 26, 2015	8	Santa Cruz, California	Solved	The perpetrator was 15 when he committed the crime. While he was initially charged as an adult, due to California law passed in 2019, he had to be charged as a juvenile. The perpetrator was sentenced to juvenile detention in 2021, and he was most recently denied parole in February 2025.
2015 Harris County shooting	August 8, 2015	6–13	Harris County, Texas	Solved	Six of the victims were children ages 6–13. The perpetrator was convicted and sentenced to life in prison without parole in 2019.
Nash Lucas	October 24, 2015	2	Stillwater, Oklahoma	Solved	Victim of 2015 Oklahoma State University homecoming parade attack.
Alexis Cruz	February 2, 2016	10	Chicago, Illinois	Solved	Victims of the 2016 Gage Park stabbings.
Leonardo Cruz	February 2, 2016	13	Chicago, Illinois	Solved	Victims of the 2016 Gage Park stabbings.
May Kieu	February 12, 2016	15	Glendale, Arizona	Solved	Murder–suicide. Killed by ex-girlfriend.
Tyler D. Smith	February 20, 2016	17	Kalamazoo, Michigan	Solved	Victim of the 2016 Kalamazoo shootings. Perpetrator pled guilty in 2019.
Christopher Rhoden Jr.	April 21–22, 2016	16	Pike County, Ohio	Solved	Victim of Pike County shootings.
Brodie Copeland	July 14, 2016	11	Nice, France	Solved	Victim of the Nice Truck attack perpetrated by Mohamed Lahouaiej-Bouhlel. He was murdered alongside his father.
Alayna Ertl	August 20, 2016	5	Cass County, Minnesota	Solved	Killed by her father's coworker.
Victoria Martens	August 23, 2016	10	Albuquerque, New Mexico	Partially solved	Three perpetrators, including Martens' mother and her mother's boyfriend, were arrested at the scene. DNA evidence indicates a fourth unknown perpetrator.
Sarai Lara	September 23, 2016	16	Burlington, Washington	Solved	Victim of the Cascade Mall Shooting. Perpetrator confessed and was charged with five counts of aggravated murder in 2016. He killed himself in his jail cell before facing a conviction or sentencing.
Zymere Perkins	September 29, 2016	6	Harlem, New York	Solved	
Jacob Hall	October 1, 2016	6	Townville, South Carolina	Solved	Hall was mortally wounded on September 28.
Emma Walker	November 21, 2016	16	Knoxville, Tennessee	Solved	In May 2018, the perpetrator was found guilty and sentenced to life in prison without the possibility of parole for 51 years.
Alianna DeFreeze	January 6, 2017	14	Cleveland, Ohio	Solved	The perpetrator was found guilty in 2018, and he was given the death sentence. His execution is scheduled for 2026.
Ashley Zhao	January 9, 2017	5	Jackson Township, Ohio	Solved	Zhao was killed by her parents and concealed in her family's restaurant.
Johnathon Higgins	January 2017	16	Kitsap County, Washington	Solved	The three perpetrators were found guilty in 2024.
Hunter Schaap	January 2017	16	Kitsap County, Washington	Solved	The three perpetrators were found guilty in 2024.
Abigail Williams	February 13, 2017	13	Deer Creek Township, Indiana	Solved	Perpetrator convicted on all counts, sentenced to 130 years in prison.
Liberty German	February 13, 2017	14	Deer Creek Township, Indiana	Solved	Perpetrator convicted on all counts, sentenced to 130 years in prison.
Genesis Cornejo-Alvarado	February 16, 2017	14	Houston, Texas	Solved	The two perpetrators pleaded guilty and were sentenced to 40 years in prison for the murder of Cornejo-Alvarado.
Jonathan Martinez	April 10, 2017	8	San Bernardino, California	Solved	Victim of the 2017 North Park Elementary School shooting. Perpetrator died from a self-inflicted gun wound.
Jordan Edwards	April 29, 2017	15	Balch Springs, Texas	Solved	The perpetrator, a police officer, was found guilty in 2018.
Reese Bowman	May 23, 2017	0 (8 months)	Baltimore, Maryland	Solved	Victim was 8 months old at time of death. She was killed by a daycare worker allegedly because she would not take a nap.
Austin Edwards	May 27, 2017	11	Lincoln County, Mississippi	Solved	Victim of the 2017 Mississippi shootings.
Jase Rackley	June 6, 2017	6	Sandy, Utah	Solved	Perpetrator died from a self-inflicted gun wound on site.
Nabra Hassanen	June 18, 2017	17	Sterling, Virginia	Solved	The perpetrator pleaded guilty to rape and murder in 2018 and received a life sentence without possibility of parole.
Olivia Gant	August 20, 2017	7	Colorado	Solved	Perpetrator, the victim's mother, pleaded guilty to child abuse negligently resulting in death in 2022.
Noah Holcombe	November 5, 2017	1	Sutherland Springs, Texas	Solved	Victims of the Sutherland Church shooting.
Brooke Bryanne Ward	November 5, 2017	5	Sutherland Springs, Texas	Solved	Victims of the Sutherland Church shooting.
Emily Garcia	November 5, 2017	7	Sutherland Springs, Texas	Solved	Victims of the Sutherland Church shooting.
Megan Gail Hill	November 5, 2017	9	Sutherland Springs, Texas	Solved	Victims of the Sutherland Church shooting.
Emily Rose Hill	November 5, 2017	11	Sutherland Springs, Texas	Solved	Victims of the Sutherland Church shooting.
Gregory Lynn Hill	November 5, 2017	13	Sutherland Springs, Texas	Solved	Victims of the Sutherland Church shooting.
Annabelle Renae Pomeroy	November 5, 2017	14	Sutherland Springs, Texas	Solved	Victims of the Sutherland Church shooting.
Haley Holcombe	November 5, 2017	16	Sutherland Springs, Texas	Solved	Victims of the Sutherland Church shooting.
Casey Jordan Marquez	December 7, 2017	17	Aztec, New Mexico	Solved	Victims of the 2017 Aztec High School shooting. Perpetrator died from a self-inflicted gunshot wound.
Francisco "Paco" Fernandez	December 7, 2017	17	Aztec, New Mexico	Solved	Victims of the 2017 Aztec High School shooting. Perpetrator died from a self-inflicted gunshot wound.
Bailey Nicole Holt	January 23, 2018	15	Benton, Kentucky	Solved	Victims of the 2018 Marshall County High School shooting. The perpetrator pled guilty to murder in 2020.
Preston Ryan Cope	January 23, 2018	15	Benton, Kentucky	Solved	Victims of the 2018 Marshall County High School shooting. The perpetrator pled guilty to murder in 2020.
Parkland high school shooting	February 14, 2018	14–17	Parkland, Florida	Solved	Thirteen victims at the Parkland high school shooting were between the ages of 14 and 17.
Ron'Niveya O'Neal	March 18, 2018	9	Riverview, Florida	Solved	Perpetrator was found guilty and given three life sentences without parole in 2021.
Ciera Hart	March 26, 2018	12	Mendocino County, California	Solved	Killed by adoptive parents in a murder–suicide.
Abigail Hart	March 26, 2018	14	Mendocino County, California	Solved	Killed by adoptive parents in a murder–suicide.
Jeremiah Hart	March 26, 2018	14	Mendocino County, California	Solved	Killed by adoptive parents in a murder–suicide.
Devonte Hart	March 26, 2018	15	Mendocino County, California	Solved	Killed by adoptive parents in a murder–suicide.
Hannah Hart	March 26, 2018	16	Mendocino County, California	Solved	Killed by adoptive parents in a murder–suicide.
Lesandro Guzman-Feliz	June 20, 2018	15	Bronx, New York City, New York	Solved	Guzman-Feliz was killed in a case of mistaken identity in gang violence. Five individuals from the Dominican gang Trinitarios were convicted in 2019.
Anthony Avalos	June 21, 2018	10	Lancaster, California	Solved	The two perpetrators, the victim's mother and her boyfriend, were found guilty in 2023 and sentenced to life in prison without the possibility of parole.
Colton Ryan Lee	July 13, 2018	7	Guntersville, Alabama	Solved	Lee and his great-grandmother were among the three victims murdered by paroled convict Jimmy O'Neal Spencer during a robbery spree in July 2018. Spencer was found guilty of multiple counts of capital murder and sentenced to death.
Mary Welch	August 2, 2018	0 (10 months)	Solon Township, Michigan	Solved	Victim died from malnutrition and dehydration. The two perpetrators were charged with first degree murder from child neglect, one convicted in 2020 and the other convicted in 2021.
Blake Shearer	August 6, 2018	16	Elizabethtown, Pennsylvania	Solved	The victim was beaten to death in a public park after refusing to turn down his music. In 2019, the perpetrator pleaded guilty to aggravated assault and involuntary manslaughter.
Bella Watts	August 13, 2018	4	Frederick, Colorado	Solved	The girls' father Christopher Watts admitted to the murder and was sentenced to five life sentences without the possibility of parole.
Celeste Watts	August 13, 2018	3	Frederick, Colorado	Solved	The girls' father Christopher Watts admitted to the murder and was sentenced to five life sentences without the possibility of parole.
Tanner Ernest	January 26, 2019	17	Livingston Parish, Louisiana	Solved	Victim of January 2019 Louisiana shootings.
Sapphire McGlothlin-Pee	April 2019	12	Sumner County, Tennessee	Solved	Victim of 2019 Sumner County murders.
Bianca Devins	July 14, 2019	17	Utica, New York	Solved	Perpetrator was sentenced to life imprisonment.
Stephen Romero	July 28, 2019	6	Gilroy, California	Solved	Victims of the Gilroy Garlic Festival shooting.
Keyla Salazar	July 28, 2019	13	Gilroy, California	Solved	Victims of the Gilroy Garlic Festival shooting.
Javier Rodriguez	August 3, 2019	15	El Paso, Texas	Solved	Victim of El Paso Walmart shooting.
Emma Grace Cole	July–September 2019	3	Smyrna, Delaware	Solved	Perpetrator pleaded guilty in 2023.
Tylee Ryan	c. September 9, 2019	16	Rexburg, Idaho	Solved	Murdered by their mother, Lori Vallow Daybell and her then-lover and now husband Chad Daybell.
J. J. Vallow	c. September 23, 2019	7	Rexburg, Idaho	Solved	Murdered by their mother, Lori Vallow Daybell and her then-lover and now husband Chad Daybell.
Gracie Anne Muehlberger	November 14, 2019	15	Santa Clarita, California	Solved	Perpetrator died from a self-inflicted gunshot wound.
Dominic Michael Blackwell	November 14, 2019	14	Santa Clarita, California	Solved	Perpetrator died from a self-inflicted gunshot wound.
Aleksander Todt	December 2019	13	Celebration, Florida	Solved	The perpetrator, the children's father, confessed and was found guilty in 2022. Their mother, Megan Todt, and the family dog, Breezy, were also murdered.
Tyler Todt	December 2019	11	Celebration, Florida	Solved	The perpetrator, the children's father, confessed and was found guilty in 2022. Their mother, Megan Todt, and the family dog, Breezy, were also murdered.
Zoe Todt	December 2019	4	Celebration, Florida	Solved	The perpetrator, the children's father, confessed and was found guilty in 2022. Their mother, Megan Todt, and the family dog, Breezy, were also murdered.
Harmony Montgomery	2019	5	Manchester, New Hampshire	Solved	Perpetrator charged with second-degree murder in 2024.

=== 2020s ===
Victim(s)	Date of death	Age	Location	Status	Description
Maylan Haynie	January 17, 2020	12	Grantsville, Utah	Solved	Perpetrator was the older brother of the victims. He received five sentences of 25 years to life with parole.
Matthew Haynie	January 17, 2020	14	Grantsville, Utah	Solved	Perpetrator was the older brother of the victims. He received five sentences of 25 years to life with parole.
Alexis Haynie	January 17, 2020	15	Grantsville, Utah	Solved	Perpetrator was the older brother of the victims. He received five sentences of 25 years to life with parole.
Gannon Stauch	January 27, 2020	11	Colorado Springs, Colorado	Solved	Perpetrator convicted of first-degree murder and sentenced to life imprisonment.
Dakota Green	June 4, 2020	17	Valhermoso Springs, Alabama	Solved	Victim of the Valhermoso Springs massacre.
Patricia Jocelyn Alatorre	July 2, 2020	13	Bakersfield, California	Solved	
Hawa Beye	August 5, 2020	0 (7 months)	Denver, Colorado	Solved	Victims Hawa Beye and Khadija Diol were respectively 6-months-old and 22-months old at time of death. Both victims died in an arson attack at their family's home.
Khadija Diol	August 5, 2020	1	Denver, Colorado	Solved	Victims Hawa Beye and Khadija Diol were respectively 6-months-old and 22-months old at time of death. Both victims died in an arson attack at their family's home.
Cannon Hinnant	August 9, 2020	5	Wilson, North Carolina	Solved	Perpetrator entered an Alford plea and was sentenced to life imprisonment.
Joseph Hawatmeh	November 3, 2020	12	Henderson, Nevada	Solved	Perpetrator shot on site by police officers while holding victim hostage.
Haiken Jirachi Myers	December 8, 2020	1	Williamsburg, West Virginia	Solved	Perpetrator died from a self-inflicted gunshot wound.
Arikyle Nova Myers	December 8, 2020	3	Williamsburg, West Virginia	Solved	Perpetrator died from a self-inflicted gunshot wound.
Kian Myers	December 8, 2020	4	Williamsburg, West Virginia	Solved	Perpetrator died from a self-inflicted gunshot wound.
Riley James Bumgarner	December 8, 2020	6	Williamsburg, West Virginia	Solved	Perpetrator died from a self-inflicted gunshot wound.
Shaun Dawson Bumgarner	December 8, 2020	7	Williamsburg, West Virginia	Solved	Perpetrator died from a self-inflicted gunshot wound.
Damia Smith	January 9, 2021	15	Chicago, Illinois	Solved	Victim of 2021 Chicago–Evanston shootings.
Victoria Rose Smith	January 14, 2021	3	Simpsonville, South Carolina	Solved	Murdered by her mother.
Jalaiya Pridgeon	February 22, 2021	1	Muskogee, Oklahoma	Solved	Victims of the 2021 Muskogee shooting.
Jaidus Pridgeon	February 22, 2021	3	Muskogee, Oklahoma	Solved	Victims of the 2021 Muskogee shooting.
Harmony Anderson	February 22, 2021	5	Muskogee, Oklahoma	Solved	Victims of the 2021 Muskogee shooting.
Neveah Pridgeon	February 22, 2021	6	Muskogee, Oklahoma	Solved	Victims of the 2021 Muskogee shooting.
Que'dynce Anderson	February 22, 2021	9	Muskogee, Oklahoma	Solved	Victims of the 2021 Muskogee shooting.
Noah Lesslie	April 7, 2021	5	Rock Hill, South Carolina	Solved	Victims of 2021 Rock Hill shooting.
Adah Lesslie	April 7, 2021	9	Rock Hill, South Carolina	Solved	Victims of 2021 Rock Hill shooting.
Tristyn Bailey	May 9, 2021	13	St. Johns County, Florida	Solved	Perpetrator was sentenced to life imprisonment.
Jackson Sparks	November 21, 2021	8	Waukesha, Wisconsin	Solved	Victim of Waukesha Christmas parade attack.
Hana St. Julianna	November 30, 2021	14	Oxford Township, Michigan	Solved	Perpetrator was sentenced to life imprisonment.
Tate Myre	November 30, 2021	16	Oxford Township, Michigan	Solved	Perpetrator was sentenced to life imprisonment.
Madisyn Baldwin	November 30, 2021	17	Oxford Township, Michigan	Solved	Perpetrator was sentenced to life imprisonment.
Justin Shilling	November 30, 2021	17	Oxford Township, Michigan	Solved	Perpetrator was sentenced to life imprisonment.
Kamarie Holland	December 13, 2021	5	Phenix City, Alabama	Solved	The perpetrator, Jeremy Williams, was sentenced to death.
Xavier Gonzalez	December 26, 2021	14	Garland, Texas	Solved	Victims of the 2021 Garland shooting.
Ivan Noyala	December 26, 2021	16	Garland, Texas	Solved	Victims of the 2021 Garland shooting.
Rafael Garcia	December 26, 2021	17	Garland, Texas	Solved	Victims of the 2021 Garland shooting.
Jose David Lopez	March 7, 2022	15	Des Moines, Iowa	Solved	Victim of 2022 East High School shooting.
Robb Elementary School shooting	May 24, 2022	9–11	Uvalde, Texas	Solved	
Estella Lee	July 1, 2022	3	Vadnais Heights, Minnesota	Solved	Murdered by their mother.
Quadrillion Lee	July 1, 2022	4	Vadnais Heights, Minnesota	Solved	Murdered by their mother.
Phoenix Lee	July 1, 2022	5	Vadnais Heights, Minnesota	Solved	Murdered by their mother.
McKinzie Siau	July 19, 2022	1	East Glacier Park Village, Montana	Solved	Victim was 18 months old at time of death. Perpetrator crashed car into victim and her family before fatally shooting her and her father.
Lula Schmidt	July 22, 2022	6	Jackson County, Iowa	Solved	
Jonael Panjon	July 27, 2022	5	Danbury, Connecticut	Solved	Murdered by their mother.
Joselyn Panjon	July 27, 2022	10	Danbury, Connecticut	Solved	Murdered by their mother.
Junior Panjon	July 27, 2022	12	Danbury, Connecticut	Solved	Murdered by their mother.
Susana Morales	July 26, 2022	16	Gwinnett County, Georgia	Solved	Kidnapped and murdered by Miles Bryant, a 22-year-old Doraville police officer, while she was walking home.
Armani Lester	August 4, 2022	0	Windsor Hills, California	Solved	Victims of the Windsor Crash. Armani was ripped from his mother's womb from the force of the impact. Perpetrator was found guilty of murder in 2026.
Alonzo Quintero	August 4, 2022	0 (11 months)	Windsor Hills, California	Solved	Victims of the Windsor Crash. Armani was ripped from his mother's womb from the force of the impact. Perpetrator was found guilty of murder in 2026.
James Roger Thompson	October 13, 2022	16	Raleigh, North Carolina	Solved	Victim was shot once and stabbed 57 times by his 15-year-old brother. He was the first victim in the 2022 Raleigh shootings.
Alexzandria Bell	October 24, 2022	15	St. Louis, Missouri	Solved	Killed during school shooting at Central Visual and Performing Arts High School.
Britannica Nelson	October 27, 2022	1	Broken Arrow, Oklahoma	Solved	Murdered by their parents.
Kurgan Nelson	October 27, 2022	2	Broken Arrow, Oklahoma	Solved	Murdered by their parents.
Ragnar Nelson	October 27, 2022	5	Broken Arrow, Oklahoma	Solved	Murdered by their parents.
Vegeta Nelson	October 27, 2022	7	Broken Arrow, Oklahoma	Solved	Murdered by their parents.
Brantley Nelson	October 27, 2022	9	Broken Arrow, Oklahoma	Solved	Murdered by their parents.
Brian II Nelson	October 27, 2022	11	Broken Arrow, Oklahoma	Solved	Murdered by their parents.
Fernando Chavez-Barron	November 22, 2022	16	Chesapeake, Virginia	Solved	Victim of 2022 Chesapeake shooting. Perpetrator died from a self-inflicted gunshot wound.
Athena Strand	November 30, 2022	7	Paradise, Texas	Solved	Kidnapped and murdered by delivery driver Tanner Horner. Horner pleaded guilty to capital murder and was sentenced to death in 2026.
Killing of the Haight family	January 4, 2023	4–17	Enoch, Utah	Solved	Michael Haight murdered his wife, mother-in-law, and five children, and then killed himself.
Evelyn Dieckhaus	March 27, 2023	9	Nashville, Tennessee	Solved	Victims of the 2023 Nashville school shooting. Perpetrator fatally shot by police officers on site.
William Kinney	March 27, 2023	9	Nashville, Tennessee	Solved	Victims of the 2023 Nashville school shooting. Perpetrator fatally shot by police officers on site.
Hallie Scruggs	March 27, 2023	9	Nashville, Tennessee	Solved	Victims of the 2023 Nashville school shooting. Perpetrator fatally shot by police officers on site.
Daniel Enrique Laze-Guzmán	April 28, 2023	9	San Jacinto County, Texas	Solved	Victim of the 2023 Cleveland, Texas shootings.
2023 Henryetta killings	May 3, 2023	13–17	near Henryetta, Oklahoma	Solved	Perpetrator murdered his wife Holly Guess, his wife's children Tiffany Guess, Michael Mayo, and Rylee Allen, and two friends of Tiffany, Ivy Webster and Brittany Brewer.
James Cho	May 6, 2023	3	Allen, Texas	Solved	Perpetrator fatally shot by police officer.
Daniela Mendoza	May 6, 2023	11	Allen, Texas	Solved	Perpetrator fatally shot by police officer.
Sofia Mendoza	May 6, 2023	8	Allen, Texas	Solved	Perpetrator fatally shot by police officer.
Jailyn Candelario	June 2023	1	Cleveland, Ohio	Solved	Kristel Candelario abandoned her infant Jailyn Candelario at home while vacationing in Puerto Rico. Kristel received a sentence of life in prison on March 18, 2024.
Chase Doerman	June 15, 2023	3	Monroe Township, Ohio	Solved	Killed by their father in the 2023 Doerman killings.
Hunter Doerman	June 15, 2023	4	Monroe Township, Ohio	Solved	Killed by their father in the 2023 Doerman killings.
Clayton Doerman	June 15, 2023	7	Monroe Township, Ohio	Solved	Killed by their father in the 2023 Doerman killings.
Dajuan Brown	July 3, 2023	15	Kingsessing, Philadelphia	Solved	Victim of the 2023 Kingsessing Shootings.
Wadea al-Fayoume	October 14, 2023	6	Plainfield Township, Illinois	Solved	
Aaron Young	October 25, 2023	14	Lewiston, Maine	Solved	Victim of 2023 Lewiston shootings.
Lizbeth Medina	December 5, 2023	16	Edna, Texas	Solved	Perpetrator convicted and is imprisoned.
Ahmir Jolliff	January 4, 2024	11	Perry, Iowa	Solved	Victim of the 2024 Perry High School shooting.
Angel Nance	January 21, 2024	14	Joliet, Illinois	Solved	Victims of the 2024 Joliet shootings. Perpetrator fatally shot himself during stand-off with police.
Alonnah Nance	January 21, 2024	16	Joliet, Illinois	Solved	Victims of the 2024 Joliet shootings. Perpetrator fatally shot himself during stand-off with police.
Xavier McLaughlin-Le	February 7, 2024	10	East Lansdowne, Pennsylvania	Solved	Victims of the 2024 East Lansdowne shooting. Perpetrator died from a self-inflicted gunshot wound.
Nakayla McLaughlin-Le	February 7, 2024	13	East Lansdowne, Pennsylvania	Solved	Victims of the 2024 East Lansdowne shooting. Perpetrator died from a self-inflicted gunshot wound.
Natalya McLaughlin-Le	February 7, 2024	17	East Lansdowne, Pennsylvania	Solved	Victims of the 2024 East Lansdowne shooting. Perpetrator died from a self-inflicted gunshot wound.
Audrii Cunningham	February 15, 2024	11	Livingston, Texas	Solved	Murdered by family friend during trip to school bus stop. Perpetrator was sentenced to life imprisonment.
Sakurako Oda	March 10, 2024	17	Manoa, Hawaii	Solved	Murdered by their father, Paris Oda, alongside their mother. Paris Oda then killed himself.
Orion Oda	March 10, 2024	12	Manoa, Hawaii	Solved	Murdered by their father, Paris Oda, alongside their mother. Paris Oda then killed himself.
Nana Oda	March 10, 2024	10	Manoa, Hawaii	Solved	Murdered by their father, Paris Oda, alongside their mother. Paris Oda then killed himself.
Mason Schermerhorn	September 4, 2024	14	Winder, Georgia	Solved	Perpetrator was sentenced to life imprisonment without parole.
Christian Angulo	September 4, 2024	14	Winder, Georgia	Solved	Perpetrator was sentenced to life imprisonment without parole.
Rubi Vergara	December 16, 2024	14	Madison, Wisconsin	Solved	Perpetrator died from a self-inflicted gunshot wound.
Josselin Corea Escalante	January 22, 2025	16	Antioch, Tennessee	Solved	Perpetrator died from a self-inflicted gunshot wound.
Brooke Basil Harshman	February 10, 2025	2	Byron, Wyoming	Solved	Murdered by their mother.
Jordan Basil Harshman	February 10, 2025	2	Byron, Wyoming	Solved	Murdered by their mother.
Olivia Blackmer	February 10, 2025	7	Byron, Wyoming	Solved	Murdered by their mother.
Braylee Shae Blackmer	February 10, 2025	9	Byron, Wyoming	Solved	Murdered by their mother.
Austin Metcalf	April 2, 2025	17	Frisco, Texas	Solved	Stabbed to death at track meet.
Olivia Decker	May 30, 2025	5	Wenatchee, Washington	Solved	Suspect was found deceased.
Evelyn Decker	May 30, 2025	8	Wenatchee, Washington	Solved	Suspect was found deceased.
Paityn Decker	May 30, 2025	9	Wenatchee, Washington	Solved	Suspect was found deceased.
Fletcher Merkel	August 27, 2025	8	Minneapolis, Minnesota	Solved	
Harper Moyski	August 27, 2025	10	Minneapolis, Minnesota	Solved	
Arius Thompson	January 2, 2026	4	Humphreys County, Tennessee	Solved	Murdered alongside their grandmother by their mother.
Isaiah Johnson	January 2, 2026	13	Humphreys County, Tennessee	Solved	Murdered alongside their grandmother by their mother.
Jayla Elkins	April 19, 2026	3	Shreveport, Louisiana	Solved	Victims of the 2026 Shreveport shooting. Perpetrator killed seven of his children and one cousin of the children.
Shayla Elkins	April 19, 2026	5	Shreveport, Louisiana	Solved	Victims of the 2026 Shreveport shooting. Perpetrator killed seven of his children and one cousin of the children.
Kayla Pugh	April 19, 2026	6	Shreveport, Louisiana	Solved	Victims of the 2026 Shreveport shooting. Perpetrator killed seven of his children and one cousin of the children.
Layla Pugh	April 19, 2026	7	Shreveport, Louisiana	Solved	Victims of the 2026 Shreveport shooting. Perpetrator killed seven of his children and one cousin of the children.
Braylon Snow	April 19, 2026	5	Shreveport, Louisiana	Solved	Victims of the 2026 Shreveport shooting. Perpetrator killed seven of his children and one cousin of the children.
Khedarrion Snow	April 19, 2026	6	Shreveport, Louisiana	Solved	Victims of the 2026 Shreveport shooting. Perpetrator killed seven of his children and one cousin of the children.
Sariahh Snow	April 19, 2026	11	Shreveport, Louisiana	Solved	Victims of the 2026 Shreveport shooting. Perpetrator killed seven of his children and one cousin of the children.
Markaydon Pugh	April 19, 2026	10	Shreveport, Louisiana	Solved	Victims of the 2026 Shreveport shooting. Perpetrator killed seven of his children and one cousin of the children.
Ryan McFarland Jr.	June 1, 2026	13	Muscatine, Iowa	Solved	Murdered by their father.
Mark McFarland	June 1, 2026	16	Muscatine, Iowa	Solved	Murdered by their father.
Theodore Karolkiewicz	July 24, 2026	5	Grand Haven, Michigan	Solved	Murdered alongside their mother Amanda, by their father, Kristopher.
Smith Karolkiewicz	July 24, 2026	11	Grand Haven, Michigan	Solved	Murdered alongside their mother Amanda, by their father, Kristopher.
Ella Karolkiewicz	July 24, 2026	11	Grand Haven, Michigan	Solved	Murdered alongside their mother Amanda, by their father, Kristopher.
Caroline Karolkiewicz	July 24, 2026	11	Grand Haven, Michigan	Solved	Murdered alongside their mother Amanda, by their father, Kristopher.
Bennett Karolkiewicz	July 24, 2026	12	Grand Haven, Michigan	Solved	Murdered alongside their mother Amanda, by their father, Kristopher.
Keegan Karolkiewicz	July 24, 2026	15	Grand Haven, Michigan	Solved	Murdered alongside their mother Amanda, by their father, Kristopher.
Chloe Ireland	August 23, 2026	9	Billings, Montana	Solved	Murdered by their uncle.
Charlotte Ghekiere	August 23, 2026	12	Billings, Montana	Solved	Murdered by their uncle.
Owen Ireland	August 23, 2026	13	Billings, Montana	Solved	Murdered by their uncle.
Landon Ghekiere	August 23, 2026	15	Billings, Montana	Solved	Murdered by their uncle.
Amari’anna Stone	October 9, 2026	1	Erie, Pennsylvania	Solved	Murdered by their grandfather.
Isiah Stone	October 9, 2026	5	Erie, Pennsylvania	Solved	Murdered by their grandfather.
Rhoam Summer	October 15, 2026	5	Bend, Oregon	Solved	Victim of the Silver Rail Elementary school shooting.

== See also ==
- List of unidentified decedents in the United States
- Parents of Murdered Children Memorial
