= Murder of Audrii Cunningham =

2024 homicide of 11-year-old girl in Texas, U.S.

- Location: Livingston, Texas, United States
- Date: February 15, 2024
- Attack type: Homicide, child murder
- Victim: Audrii Cunningham
- Charges: Capital murder
- Verdict: Pleaded guilty, automatic life sentence without parole
- Convicted: Don Steven McDougal

On February 15, 2024, 11-year-old Audrii Danielle Cunningham (born February 5, 2013) disappeared while traveling to her school bus stop in Livingston, Texas, United States. Her case gained national and significant media attention.

Her body was recovered on February 20 in the nearby Trinity River. A 42-year-old family friend, Don McDougal, was charged with murder in connection to her death.

== Disappearance ==
On February 15, 2024, Cunningham was reported missing after she didn’t show up for the school bus. Her backpack was found near to Lake Livingston. An Amber alert was issued for Cunningham. Five days later, Cunningham's body was found in the Trinity River, Texas.

== Perpetrator ==
42-year-old Don McDougal was taken into custody on charges of aggravated assault on February 16, the day after Cunningham's disappearance. After the discovery of her body, he was charged with murder.

McDougal was a friend of Cunningham's father and lived in a trailer on their property. He sometimes transported Audrii to the bus stop before her disappearance. From 2003 until his arrest, McDougal incurred a lengthy criminal record in Texas, including charges of assault, theft, possession of methamphetamine, and child molestation, which was pled down to “enticing a minor”, allowing him to remain off the sex offender registry. He was sentenced to two years in prison for the latter charge. His latest sentence, two years in prison for unauthorized use of a vehicle, was completed in September 2022. Before his arrest, he posted on Facebook, saying he was "not guilty". He was held without bail. On April 22, McDougal was indicted on two counts of capital murder. On January 17, 2025, Don McDougal pleaded guilty to Cunningham's murder and was automatically sentenced to life without parole.

== Aftermath ==
An autopsy determined that Audrii died of blunt head trauma. A memorial service was held for Cunningham on March 2.

== See also ==
- List of murdered American children
- List of solved missing person cases (2020s)
