= Vadnais Lake =

Lake in Minnesota, United States

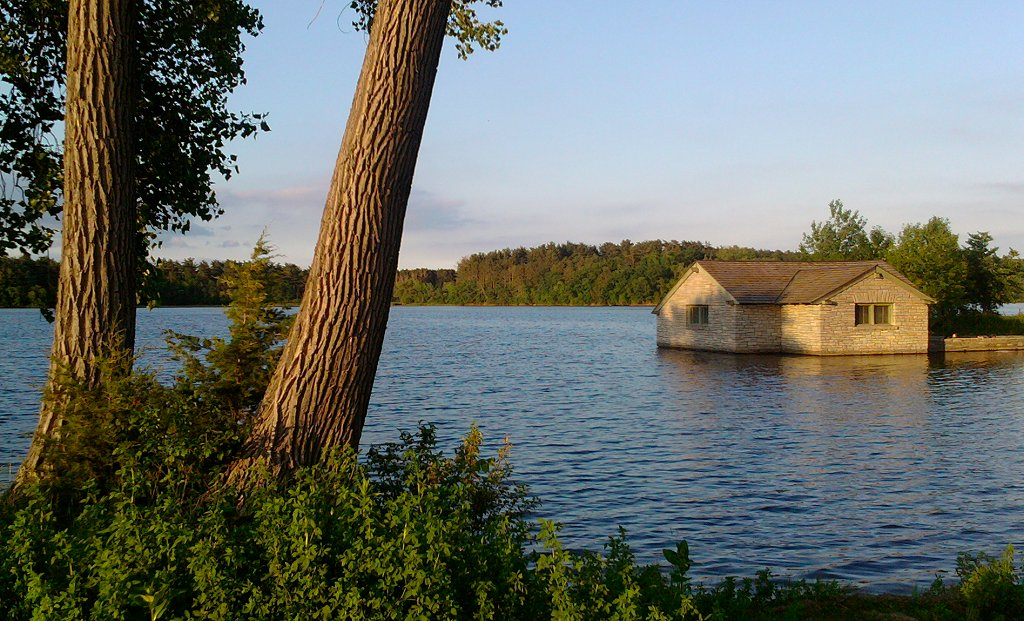

- Location within Minnesota
- Location: Ramsey County, Minnesota
- Coordinates: 45°3′10″N 93°5′30″W
- Type: lake

Vadnais Lake is a lake in Ramsey County, in the U.S. state of Minnesota.

Vadnais Lake was named after John Vadnais, a pioneer settler.

== 2022 murders ==
The area gained national attention, when a statewide alert went out, after a young Hmong mother, Molly Cheng, said she was going to kill herself and her three children, after her husband committed suicide. Authorities were able to track her phone, were the found her car and the children’s shoes on the shores of the lake. The soon found the families bodies in the lake and pulled them out. Autopsies showed the eldest and youngest child died from a mix of smothering and drowning, and the middle child and Molly died from drowning.

The murders prompted discussions of mental health in the Hmong community and leaders took measures to help prevent another tragedy to occur. A Hmong 18 council member criticized the police response as well as social workers, saying they should have kept an eye on Cheng.

== See also ==
- List of lakes in Minnesota
