= Hattie Whitten =

American serial killer

- Born: Hattie Livermore; July 24, 1862; Dover, Maine, U.S.
- Died: November 30, 1902 (aged 40); Dexter, Maine, U.S.
- Cause of death: Suicide by hanging
- Conviction: N/A
- Penalty: N/A

Details
- Victims: 3
- Span of crimes: 1900–1902
- Country: United States
- State: Maine
- Date apprehended: November 29, 1902

Hattie Livermore Whitten (July 24, 1862 – November 30, 1902) was an American serial killer who poisoned her husband and two daughters in the early 20th-century. Arrested after attending her daughter's funeral, Whitten hanged herself while in prison custody, and thus was unable to be put on trial for her crimes.

== Life and crimes ==
As a whole, little is known of Hattie's early life prior to her moving to Dexter. It was reported that she came from a respectable family in Dover, one of two daughters born to David and Esther (née Lord) Livermore. At some point in her life, she married Harry E. Whitten and gave birth to three children: Fannie, Jennie and Lewis. In 1900, Harry died suddenly under suspicious circumstances, most likely as a result of poisoning from his wife. In the following two years, friends and acquaintances noted that Mrs. Whitten's behavior became odd, evidently from a morphine addiction.

Sometime in September 1902, the Whittens moved to Dexter, with Hattie running a boarding house for a short time period. On September 19, 11-year-old Fannie died suddenly, with the coroner ruling the cause of death as meningitis. This was suspicious, however, as the little girl appeared to be in good health, with no obvious signs of any ailment. Nevertheless, Hattie had insured her daughter, receiving $85 from the insurance company.

== Exposure, arrest and suicide ==
About a month after Fannie's death, Jennie and Lewis began to notice that their mother's mental health rapidly deteriorating. Not long after, tragedy struck again - the 9-year-old Jennie also died suddenly on November 27, from what was supposed to be heart failure. But authorities were suspicious, as the Whitten girl was insured for $50 by her mother, and requested that coroner George M. Barrows examine the little girl's corpse. To his shock, Barrows discovered traces of arsenic and strychnine in Jennie's body, which led him to issue an arrest warrant for murder. The day after, Hattie Whitten was arrested at her home immediately after returning from her daughter's funeral.

While Hattie was held in custody, Fannie's body was exhumed and tested as well. While the autopsy results were never publicly disclosed, it is very likely that traces of poison were found in her as well. Not long after, Mrs. Whitten was arraigned before the court for Jennie's murder, pleading not guilty to the charge. She was to be held until Tuesday in the custody of Dep. Leslie Curtis, but stayed the night in the house of her son Lewis, sleeping soundly next to her elderly mother. On November 30, the deputy took the suspected poisoner into his home, where he kept her under house arrest. Around noon, Curtis briefly left the house so he could feed his horse in the barn. Seizing the opportunity, Hattie Whitten took two towels and tied them together into a noose, with which she hanged herself from the bed post. When Curtis found her lifeless body, he called in medical staff to help resuscitate her, but to no avail. Along with her daughters, Hattie was buried at the family plot in Evergreen Cemetery, in Milo.

Some time after her death, some peculiar facts were revealed to the public, including a possible motive for her filicides: ever since coming to Dexter, Hattie had been courted by a weaver named Surto, whom she planned to marry. However, Surto refused to engage with a woman who had children of her own, which likely led to Whitten's decision to end her kids' lives. Circumstantial evidence supporting her guilt was also disclosed, as a day prior to Fannie's death, she was seen buying laudanum, arsenic and castor oil; similarly, while the still-healthy Jennie was out selling wares so she could buy her mother a present for Christmas, Hattie was seen buying the arsenic and strychnine she would later kill her with. Dr. Murphy, who attended both of the children, voiced his opinion that the poisons were likely ingested in the form of oil, so they could easily pass through the stomach into the intestines. When it came to the death of Jennie, Hattie had apparently left a postal card calling for the doctor to treat her, despite him living only half a mile away from her residence, and having a telephone.

== See also ==
- List of serial killers in the United States
