= David family murder–suicide =

American familicide case

Murder–suicide of the David family
- Location: Salt Lake City, Utah, United States
- Date: August 3, 1978; 48 years ago
- Attack type: Murder-suicide
- Deaths: 8 (including the perpetrator)
- Perpetrator: Rachal David (the mother)

The David family murder–suicide refers to a familicide which took place in Salt Lake City, United States, on the morning of August 3, 1978. Rachal David (1939–1978) pushed several of her children off an 11th floor hotel balcony, and convinced at least the three oldest children to jump to their deaths, after which she also jumped. Rachel David died along with six of her children. A 15-year-old girl survived after spending a year in the hospital. Three days earlier, Rachal's husband Immanuel David (1938–1978) had died by suicide.

It is considered to be one of the worst mass murders and familicide in the state of Utah.

== Background ==
Immanuel was born Charles Bruce Longo and changed his name by 1970. He was a member of the Church of Jesus Christ of Latter-day Saints (LDS Church), but was excommunicated in June 1969. Immanuel was introduced to the LDS church while in the US Army. After his time in the military, he was a Mormon missionary in Uruguay. He later met Swedish woman Rachal (formerly Margit Briggita Ericsson) while enrolled at Brigham Young University.

They were married and had several children, before Immanuel said he was a prophet and divine figure and developed a group of followers they called Family of David. David died by suicide in Emigration Canyon near Salt Lake City while under FBI investigation for federal wire fraud.

Three days after his death, Rachel rented a room at the hotel where the deaths occurred. The hotel was then called the International Dunes Hotel, but was a Holiday Inn as of 2014.

The murder-suicide was related to the family's religious beliefs around Immanuel's claimed divine calling and wanting to follow him to the next life. It is also believed the deaths were movitated by a combination of loyalty and altruism, as well as financial concerns.

== Aftermath ==
Following the David family deaths, some of Immanuel's followers continued in the Family of David, and in 2000 some reported awaiting the return of Immanuel.

One of those followers was the surviving daughter, now in a wheelchair after surviving the jump and after several suicide attempts.

== See also ==
- Mormonism and violence
- Immanuel David Isaiah
