= Howard Ault =

American convicted child murderer and sex offender (born 1966)

Howard Steven Ault
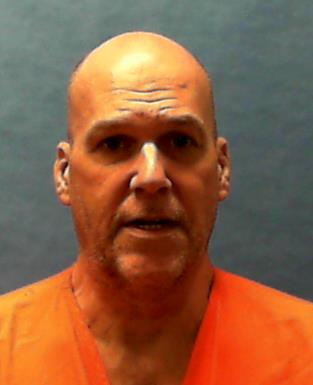
- Born: July 26, 1966 (age 60); Florida, U.S.
- Convictions: 1988; Burglary; Attempted sexual battery; 1999; Sexual battery of victim younger that 12; Attempted sexual battery of victim younger that 12; Kidnapping of victim younger than 13; Lewd, lascivious or indecent assault of child under 16; Lewd assault or sexual battery of victim under 16; Aggravated child abuse; 2000; First-degree murder (2 counts); Sexual battery of victim younger that 12 (2 counts); Kidnapping of victim younger than 13 (2 counts); Aggravated child abuse (2 counts)
- Penalty: 1988; Seven years' imprisonment; 1999; Life imprisonment; 2000; Death

Details
- Victims: 2 murder victims, multiple rape victims
- Date: 1986 – 1996
- Location: Fort Lauderdale, Florida
- Imprisoned at: Union Correctional Institution

Howard Steven Ault (born July 26, 1966) is an American convicted child murderer and sex offender. On November 4, 1996, Ault, who had previous charges for sex crimes against minors, lured a pair of African-American sisters, 11-year-old DeAnn Emerald Mu'min and 7-year-old Alicia Sybilla Jones, into his apartment in Fort Lauderdale, Florida, after promising them some candy. Afterwards, Ault raped the elder sister, Mu'min, before he ultimately murdered both girls. Ault was found guilty of murdering the girls and sentenced to death, although his death sentence was being overturned twice before it was reinstated. Currently, Ault remains on death row awaiting execution.

== Early life ==
Howard Steven Ault was born on July 26, 1966, in Florida. According to media and court sources, Ault did not have a stable childhood, as his father was said to be a harsh disciplinarian, and often beat his children and locked them in their rooms, and his mother was also alcoholic. Ault was also being sexually abused by an older brother multiple times during his childhood.

Before the murders, Howard Steven Ault had a prior criminal record that included several violent and sexual offenses, some involving minors. In 1986, he was arrested for aggravated battery after a knife attack on a couple. He later pleaded guilty to burglary and attempted sexual battery involving a 12-year-old girl and served part of a seven-year sentence. In 1995, he was charged with sexual battery against a 6-year-old girl but received house arrest after a plea agreement. While on house arrest, he was accused of attempting to assault an 11-year-old girl in 1995, though his arrest in that case was delayed.

== 1996 murders of DeAnn Mu'min and Alicia Jones ==
On November 4, 1996, in Fort Lauderdale, Florida, Howard Ault committed the kidnappings and murders of two young girls, who were both sisters. The two sisters, 11-year-old DeAnn Emerald Mu'min and 7-year-old Alicia Sybilla Jones, were last seen walking home from school and on their way back home, they encountered Ault, who had befriended their mother in the past, and they agreed to follow Ault after he promised to give them candy. At that time, Ault was on supervised community release for a 1988 sex crime, and also facing investigation for an unrelated charge of sexually assaulting a 11-year-old girl 11 months earlier. Several witnesses had seen the girls together with Ault in his truck and also at the convenience store where he met and picked up the girls.

After bringing the girls to his apartment, Ault raped the older sister, Mu'min, and also used his finger to sexually penetrate her vaginal area. Afterwards, while Mu'min resisted and screamed, Ault strangled her to death, before he subsequently strangled Jones to death, although Jones was not raped before her death. After murdering the girls, Ault hid the bodies inside his attic. In his confession, Ault admitted to committing the murders to eliminate potential witnesses and prevent his return to prison.

The mother of the girls later reported her daughters missing, after she tried to search for Mu'min and Jones. The police interviewed Ault as part of their investigations into the girls' disappearance, and originally, Ault denied that he saw the girls, before the police received testimonies from multiple witnesses that they last saw the girls with Ault before they went missing. Ault was later arrested, and he confessed that he killed the girls and kept them in the attic, where the police found the bodies.

An autopsy revealed that both girls died from manual strangulation, and that there was also bruising and hemorrhaging of Mu'min's vaginal tissue, proving that she was raped by Ault before her death. It was certified that Mu'min died approximately two days before the body was discovered, while the estimated time of death in Jones's case occurred about 12 to 18 hours after Mu'min was murdered.

The murders of Mu'min and Jones shocked the whole community, and it brought attention to the fact that Ault, a recalcitrant child sex offender, still remained free despite his crimes against minors and it partially contributed to the murders. In response to the public outrage and nature of the double murder, state lawmakers agreed to introduce harsher laws to prevent sexual predators from committing more crimes.

== Murder trial ==
On November 6, 1996, Howard Ault was charged with two counts of murder for the deaths of DeAnn Mu'min and Alicia Jones.

On November 20, 1996, a Broward County grand jury formally indicted Ault on a total of eight criminal charges, which consisted of two counts each of first-degree murder, sexual battery, aggravated child abuse and kidnapping a child under 13.

On August 3, 1999, the trial of Howard Ault began before a Broward County jury.

On August 11, 1999, the jury found Ault guilty of both counts of first-degree murder for the killings of both Jones and Mu'min.

On September 22, 1999, the prosecution sought the death penalty on the basis that Ault had committed the murders of both the girls in callous and inhumane fashion, and his motive was to eliminate witnesses to his crimes, and he also had previous convictions for violent offences like assaulting a police officer and sexual assault of a child in 1986 and 1994 respectively. On the other hand, the defence argued that Ault should not be sentenced to death, on account of his dysfunctional childhood, mainly centering around his past as a victim of sexual abuse by his older brother, the abusive nature of his father and the alcoholism of his mother; at one instance, Ault and his siblings were beaten and locked in their rooms. However, while Ault and his mother testified about his childhood, Ault's two sisters denied that their childhood were unhappy and stated that it was happy despite the harsh disciplinary methods of Ault's father.

On September 30, 1999, by a majority vote of 9–3, the jury recommended the death penalty for Ault on both murders.

On March 14, 2000, Ault was formally sentenced to death via the electric chair by Circuit Judge Marc Gold.

== First re-sentencing trial and appeals ==
On November 7, 2003, Ault's death sentences were overturned by the Florida Supreme Court, after they found that a potential juror who opposed capital punishment was wrongly dismissed by the judge during jury selection.

In August 2007, the re-sentencing trial of Ault began before a Broward County jury, who were presented with the details of the murders. The prosecution argued for the death penalty to be re-imposed, given that Ault had an egregious criminal history and also ruthlessly murdered the two young girls in a heinous fashion, while the defence argued that Ault should be spared the death sentence on humanitarian grounds due to his traumatic experience as a victim of child abuse.

On August 22, 2007, the jury recommended the death penalty for Ault on both counts of murdering the two girls. In the case of Mu'min, the vote was 9–3, while for the killing of Jones, the vote was 10–2.

On October 24, 2007, Circuit Judge Marc Gold formally sentenced Ault to death for the sisters' murders.

On September 30, 2010, the Florida Supreme Court dismissed Ault's appeal against his death sentence.

In 2011, Ault expressed his intention to waive his remaining appeals and be executed as soon as possible. However, on January 22, 2012, Ault's motion was denied after the judge found that he refused to take medications for his psychiatric condition and out of concern that he was potentially not mentally competent to decide on forgoing his appeals and be executed.

== Second re-sentencing trial ==
On March 9, 2017, the Florida Supreme Court upheld Howard Ault's convictions for the murders of DeAnn Mu'min and Alicia Jones, but the death sentences were overturned after the court found Ault was entitled to a new sentencing hearing, given that the sentences were imposed by non-unanimous decisions. A year prior, the U.S. Supreme Court issued a landmark ruling in the Hurst v. Florida case, ruling that the death penalty in Florida was partially unconstitutional due to the judges having too much power compared to juries in sentencing people to death, and the law was amended to allow only unanimous verdicts of death.

In April 2023, while Ault's re-sentencing application was still pending, the state of Florida officially abolished the death penalty laws that required a unanimous vote to impose capital punishment, and Florida Governor Ron DeSantis signed a new law to allow the death penalty be imposed based on a majority vote from a minimum of eight jurors out of the 12-member jury. The law was changed partially due to the fact that Nikolas Cruz, who murdered 17 people and wounded another 17 in a school shooting, evading the death penalty after the jury failed to reach a unanimous vote for capital punishment.

The second re-sentencing trial took place in February 2024. The prosecution once again seek the death penalty for Ault, citing the aggravating circumstances behind the murders and Ault's conduct as their reasons in favour of capital punishment. The confession tapes that recorded Ault's confession were also played in court for the jury.

On February 24, 2024, by a majority vote of 9–3, the jury agreed to sentence Ault to death for both murders.

On June 11, 2024, Broward Circuit Judge Martin Fein formally sentenced 57-year-old Howard Ault to death for the murders of Jones and Mu'min.

As of 2026, Ault remains incarcerated at the Union Correctional Institution.

== See also ==
- Capital punishment in Florida
- List of death row inmates in the United States § Florida
