= Beckettville =

Neighborhood in Danbury, Connecticut, United States

- Neighborhood
- Location in Connecticut Location in the United States
- Coordinates: 41°23′35.34″N 73°28′21.44″W
- Country: United States
- U.S. state: Connecticut
- County: Fairfield
- Region: Western CT
- City: Danbury

Beckettville is a neighborhood in the City of Danbury, Fairfield County, Connecticut, United States. This section is located on the western side of Danbury, with Westville Avenue as its main thoroughfare. It is named after the Beckett family, former residents of the area.

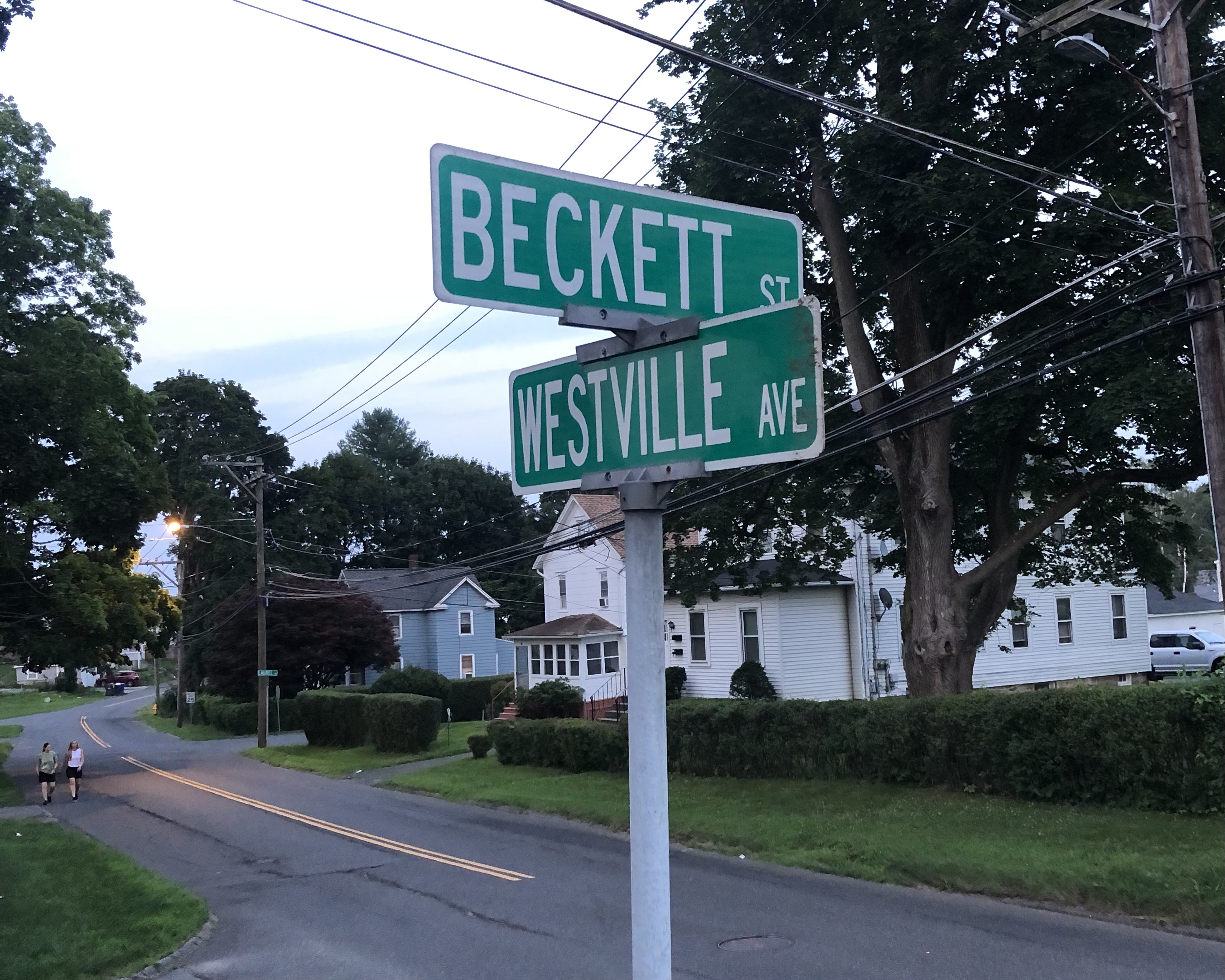

== 2022 murders ==
On July 27, 2022, The area gained national attention when Sonia Lajo, strangled her three children, before committing suicide in the garden shed. The mayor of Danbury, Dean Esposito, issued a statement on the matter; “A truly horrible event occurred in our city yesterday and we mourn the tragic loss of life. In the coming days, mental health and counseling services will be provided through collaboration with the Danbury Public Schools and the City of Danbury. Our community grieves for the innocent lives taken from us. We will get through this together.” In the aftermath of the murders, a support group was open to help those struggling with their mental health in the immigrant community.
