= Russell family shooting =

1925 mass shooting in Hamilton, Ohio, U.S.

- Location: Hamilton, Ohio, U.S.
- Date: June 4, 1925
- Attack type: mass shooting familicide
- Weapon: Two revolvers
- Deaths: 8
- Injuries: 1 (the perpetrator)
- Perpetrator: Francis Lloyd Russell

On June 4, 1925, Francis Lloyd Russell, a 43-year-old man described as having become violently insane, fatally shot eight members of his family while most of them were sleeping in a mass shooting in Hamilton, Ohio, and subsequently attempted to commit suicide by shooting himself in his left lung, causing injury.

== Shootings ==
Russell first shot and killed his 60-year-old mother, his brother, his brother's wife, along with five of their children. One of their children, their 10-year-old daughter, was unharmed after she hid under a bed, escaping his attack. After fatally shooting the victims, Russell continued to shoot his lifeless nieces and nephews. After the shootings, he attempted suicide by shooting himself non-fatally in the left lung. Russell used two weapons to commit the shooting. Russel had fired about 50 rounds in total. According to authorities, Russel "talked incoherently about a mortgage on the home and said he would shoot the pictures off the wall."
