= Westernville New Year's Day shooting =

Mass shooting in New York

- Location: Westernville, New York, United States
- Date: January 1–2, 1969
- Attack type: Mass murder, mass shooting
- Deaths: 5 (including the perpetrator)
- Injuries: 5
- Perpetrator: Ralph MacLachlan

The Westernville New Year's Day shooting was a mass murder that occurred at a family gathering in Westernville, New York, United States on New Year's Day in 1969. Ralph Edwin MacLachlan, 37, a meat cutter and church elder, armed with a semi-automatic .22-caliber rifle, killed four people, including his wife, and injured five others. The next morning, MacLachlan committed suicide by shooting himself following an exchange of gunfire with police. Following the shooting, MacLachlan's brother stated that he had "no indication he was acting abnormally" during a phone conversation around an hour before the shooting. At the time, according to his brother, MacLachlan was watching a New Year's Day bowl game on the television.

== Victims ==
Four people were shot and killed, and a further five were injured. The fatalities include:

- Anita MacLachlan (née Turke), 31, the perpetrator's wife
- Jane Ringrose (née Turke), 35, the perpetrator's sister-in-law
- Barbara Jean Ringrose, 12, the perpetrator's niece
- Milton James Pepper, 14, the family's neighbor

Additionally, the shooter injured his 68-year-old father-in-law Perry Turke, 61-year-old mother-in-law Margaret Turke, 10-year-old niece Anne Ringrose, 35-year-old brother-in-law Robert Ringrose, and 36-year-old neighbor Joyce Pepper, who was the mother of Milton. MacLachlan and Anita's two-year-old and nine-month-old sons were unharmed after Anita hid them in a bedroom closet.
