= Allyson McConnell =

Australian woman who murdered her children

(Counterclockwise from upper right) Allyson McConnell with her then-husband Curtis, her older son Connor, and her younger son Jayden; McConnell killed both children

Allyson McConnell (née Meagher, November 1978 – September 2013) was an Australian resident in Millet, Alberta, Canada who, in 2010, killed her sons by drowning them in a bathtub. She was convicted of manslaughter and deported to Australia. An appeal of her conviction, seeking to return her to Canada for a retrial, was scheduled, but she died by suicide before this could happen.

== Early life ==
Allyson Meagher was born sometime in November 1978 and originated from Gosford, New South Wales.

Meagher was an Instructor with the Australian Air Force Cadets whilst living in NSW. She attained the rank of Corporal (AAFC).

Throughout her life she had engaged in suicide attempts.

== Marriage with Curtis McConnell ==
In 2006 she met Curtis McConnell at the Delta Ski Resort in Kamloops, British Columbia; both were employed by the resort and she was on a working holiday. She married him in January 2007 while the two were in Australia. In July of that year Connor McConnell was born while they were in that country. The couple later purchased a house in Millet.

Their second child, Jayden, was born in March 2009; at that time Allyson McConnell had started a job in Leduc, Alberta. She later stated in court that she did not plan to have a second child. Allyson McConnell worked for an oil company, while her husband worked in a hardware store.

Their marriage encountered problems in the fall of 2009. Curtis McConnell began living in the house's basement. Allyson became upset and depressed as her marriage unraveled.

Curtis filed for divorce in December of that year and moved into his parents' house. At first Allyson McConnell had an amicable relationship with her ex-husband's mother, but then McConnell ended contact with her. The ex-husband and ex-wife entered into a custody dispute; she wanted the children in Australia while he wanted them to remain in Canada. A judge had ruled that the children should remain in Canada.

== Murder ==
Allyson McConnell, 33 at the time, drowned both of her children in a bathtub. Connor was two and a half years old and Jayden was ten months old. It is not known when the children were killed. She then drove to Edmonton and, after having a meal, jumped from an overpass, and landed on a road. She had multiple broken bones.

On February 1, 2010, a police officer in Edmonton called Curtis McConnell, informing him of his wife's injury. The officer was not aware of the location and status of the children. Curtis McConnell returned to the house to check on the welfare of the children and used a knife to open the locked bathroom door. He discovered the children's bodies floating in the bathtub and a wedding ring on the toilet seat.

Curtis McConnell later, citing the placement of the wedding ring, expressed his belief that Allyson McConnell killed the children as a form of revenge against him, stating he initially did not believe this but later re-evaluated his understanding of the case.

== Aftermath, legal outcome and death ==
Allyson McConnell survived her suicide attempt and was placed in the hospital; she said she had no memory of the incident after waking up. After hospitalization was over, she was moved to psychiatric care at Alberta Hospital Edmonton. She served fifteen months there.

The boys' funeral was held five days after the discovery of their bodies. Family members on both sides were mentioned, but the mother was not.

Crown Prosecutor Gordon Hatch tried the case. McConnell was convicted of manslaughter in 2012. Justice Michelle Crighton stated that McConnell did not have sufficient intent for a murder charge; this was given on the grounds that she did not remember the crime and was depressed. McConnell was originally sentenced to six years of prison, but this was later changed to sentenced to 15 months of confinement; she was eligible for release due to the time she spent at the psychiatric hospital. She was scheduled for deportation to Australia.

The Alberta government unsuccessfully tried to block her deportation. Alberta Minister of Justice Jonathan Denis criticized the sentence, saying it was too light, and stated that he would take efforts to have McConnell brought back to Canada for another trial. Hatch stated that he planned to file an appeal and that the McConnell family was not satisfied with the decision. Curtis McConnell also filed a civil suit against Allyson McConnell for $940,000 Canadian dollars ($903,000 Australian dollars).

After her conviction, McConnell was deported to Australia on April 10, 2013, arriving at Sydney Airport. At the time prosecutors in Canada were still attempting to succeed in their appeal and have McConnell returned to Canada to face harsher penalties. The appeal hearing was scheduled for October 30 of that year.

In September 2013 a person found Allyson McConnell's body under the Brian McGowan Bridge in West Gosford, New South Wales, Australia. Her lawyer, Peter Royal, stated that she had committed suicide. Alberta Deputy Premier Thomas Lukaszuk posted a tweet stating that McConnell's death was a "Sad end to what already was a tragedy".

== See also ==
Cases of filicide in Canada:

- Elaine Campione

Cases of filicide attributed to revenge against an ex-spouse:

- John Battaglia
- Amy Hebert
- Murder of the Kumari-Baker sisters
- Charles Mihayo
- Aaron Schaffhausen
