= Killing of Joshua and Luke Laney =

Killings by Deanna Laney of her two oldest sons

- Location: New Chapel Hill, Texas, U.S.
- Date: May 9, 2003; 23 years ago
- Attack type: Blunt force trauma
- Deaths: 2
- Injuries: 1
- Victims: Joshua Laney, aged 8; Luke Laney, aged 6
- Perpetrator: Deanna Laney
- Verdict: Not guilty by reason of insanity

On May 9, 2003, Deanna Laney killed her two sons, Joshua Laney, 8, and Luke Laney, 6, outside their home in New Chapel Hill, Texas. In a 2004 trial, she was found not guilty by reason of insanity.

== Details ==
At roughly 11:30 pm on May 9, 2003, Laney woke and took Joshua, 8, to the yard of her home in New Chapel Hill, Texas, where she lifted a large rock over her head and brought it down against his skull, fatally wounding him. She then dragged her 6-year-old son, Luke, to the same area, and killed him in the same manner. At some point afterward, she attempted to kill her youngest son, 14-month-old Aaron, in his crib with a stone. He was found alive with a pillow placed over his face, having sustained severe head injuries.

During the investigation, Laney claimed God ordered her to bash in her sons' heads. She was a member of an Assemblies of God church, where she sang in the choir. A year earlier, she had told her fellow churchgoers that the world was coming to an end and that God had told her to get her house in order. She later told a psychiatrist that she hoped she and Andrea Yates would end up working together as God's only witnesses at the end of the world.

Five mental health experts were consulted in Laney's case: two each by the prosecution and defense, and one by the judge. All of them arrived at the conclusion that she had psychotic delusions which made her unable to know right from wrong at the time of the killings. A Smith County court found her not guilty by reason of insanity. She was committed to Kerrville State Hospital, spending eight years there until her release in May 2012. She is subject to a list of conditions, including that she have no unsupervised contact with minors and that she submit to regular drug tests to ensure that she takes required medication.

== See also ==
Other cases of filicide in Texas:

- John Battaglia
- Ronald Clark O'Bryan
- Darlie Routier
- Yaser Abdel Said
- Dena Schlosser
- Andrea Yates
