= Amy Hebert =

American murderer

Amy T. Hebert
- Born: Amy Talbot
- Occupation: Teacher's aide
- Spouse: Chad Hebert (div. 2006)
- Children: Camille Catherine Hebert (1998–2007); Braxton John Hebert (2000–2007)
- Status: Incarcerated
- Motive: Revenge against ex-husband
- Conviction: First degree murder (2 counts)
- Penalty: Life imprisonment

Details
- Victims: Camille and Braxton Hebert (her children) and the family dog
- Date: August 20, 2007
- Locations: Mathews, Louisiana, U.S.
- Weapon: Knives

Amy T. Hebert (née Talbot) is a woman from Mathews, Louisiana, United States, who was convicted of murdering her two children in August 2007 in an act of revenge against her ex-husband. She also killed the family dog. She was sentenced to life in prison without the possibility of parole.

== Background ==
Hebert, originally from Lafourche Parish, Louisiana, worked as a teacher's aide at Lockport Lower Elementary School in Lockport. In her criminal trial, experts summoned by the prosecution and the defense stated that she had been severely depressed around the time she committed the crime.

Hebert's husband, Chad, sought a divorce in 2005, which was finalized in April of the following year. He subsequently entered into a relationship with another woman, whom he married in 2008.

At the times of their deaths, Hebert's son, Braxton, attended Lockport Lower, while her daughter, Camille, attended Lockport Upper Elementary School. Chad and Amy held joint custody of the children. Raymond Legendre of Houma Today/The Daily Comet stated that Braxton was "mildly autistic". The family had a dog named Princess.

== Crime ==
On August 20, 2007, Hebert fatally stabbed her children and the family dog; Camille was aged 9 and Braxton was aged 7. She told a psychiatrist that Camille had begged for her life. The children had defensive wounds to their hands and arms; Camille had about 30–35 stab wounds to the front of her torso while Braxton had about 50-55 stab wounds to his torso, with about 30 to the front and 20–25 to the back. All of Camille's vital organs had been hit, and both victims had been stabbed in the heart. Camille was also stabbed on her scalp about 30 times; the blade did not penetrate her skull. Amy Hebert also stabbed herself about 30 times, giving herself wounds in the abdomen, chest, neck, and wrists.

An employee of Jefferson Parish's crime laboratory, Tim Scanlan, stated that while authorities discovered Hebert and the children in bed together, she stabbed herself and them elsewhere. He did not state where Braxton was attacked; psychologist Glenn Ahava stated that Hebert said that she attacked Braxton on a couch. Scanlan believed Camille was likely attacked in Hebert's bedroom and the bathroom, and that Hebert injured herself in one or both of those locations. According to Ahava, Hebert said that Camille had been sleeping in the bed in that room and that she stabbed her in both of those rooms. Scanlan also stated that she attacked the dog in the utility room.

A co-worker who noticed Hebert did not show up to work drove by her house and, after knocking on the door and receiving no response, contacted a member of her family. Chad dialed 9-1-1, asking authorities to check on the welfare of the children. His father, R.J. "Buck" Hebert, came to the house and discovered the crime scene. Deputies of the Lafourche Parish Sheriff's Office subsequently entered the house and used a taser to subdue Hebert. Sheriff Craig Webre of Lafourche Parish stated that as the children's bodies were in rigor mortis upon discovery, they had been dead for more than one hour. They were transported to Jefferson Parish for their autopsies.

Hebert was treated in the intensive care unit at Ochsner St. Anne General Hospital in Raceland. Mark Hebert, a doctor (no relation), stated in records at the Ochsner hospital that her self-inflicted injuries were life-threatening.

== Legal proceedings and punishment ==
After her hospitalization, Hebert was booked to be held at the Lafourche Parish Detention Center in Thibodaux, but instead was held at the Louisiana Correctional Institute for Women (LCIW) in St. Gabriel, the sole state prison for women in Louisiana; this arrangement was made since Lafourche Parish Detention Center could not accommodate a female pre-trial inmate who was accused of committing a felony and who needed medical care. Hebert's bond was set at $1 million.

The prosecuting attorney was the district attorney of Lafourche Parish, Camille "Cam" Morvant II. The defense lawyers were George Parnham, Richard Goorley, and Marty Stroud; the first had defended Andrea Yates and the latter two were from Capital Assistance Project of Louisiana. This was the first capital murder case tried by Morvant.

Morvant stated that Hebert was resentful of Chad, while her defense attorneys argued she was under a form of insanity. Dr. Alexandra Philips, the psychiatrist at Ochsner St. Anne, stated that Hebert, an evangelical Christian, had told her "Satan was in the room laughing at her". Both the prosecution and defense had psychiatrists who supported their respective versions of the events. The prosecutor also presented two suicide notes written by Hebert to Chad and his mother, which stated that he had committed infidelity and that he would not get the children. Sophia Ruffin of The Houma Times characterized the notes as "vitriolic". According to court testimony, Chad's mother encouraged the children to have a relationship with their stepmother, something Hebert disapproved of.

Hebert was convicted of the murders and received two life sentences, one for each child. Even though Goorley asked the judge to let her serve the sentences concurrently, on the grounds that she had no previous criminal record, District Judge Jerome Barbera instead chose to mandate that Hebert's life sentences be served consecutively on the basis that she had killed two people. Jurors voted on whether to give her the death penalty, but the 9-3 vote in favor of death was insufficient to successfully sentence her to death, as the State of Louisiana requires a unanimous decision; therefore, the default punishment of life in prison applied. The trial had a cost of about $100,000.

As a sentenced felon, Hebert is incarcerated at LCIW. In 2011 and 2015 her appeals were denied by the Louisiana Supreme Court.

Subsequently, Hebert entered an appeal in federal court. Her legal representation, based in New Orleans, was Letty S. Di Giulio, who stated that the interviews with mental health experts proved she was insane. The appeal accused the attorney of doing low quality work and the courts of improperly vetting the jury pool. In May 2018, the U.S. Fifth Circuit Court of Appeals denied the appeal. The U.S. Supreme Court denied a hearing of her appeal in April 2019. Joe Soignet, an assistant attorney with Lafourche Parish's courts, stated that the action, which is an example of the length of time an appeals process is completed for a prisoner, as over a decade had elapsed after the conviction, "literally closes the book on the case."

LCIW was damaged by the 2016 floods. As of 2019 Hebert was held in the LCIW temporary facility in the former Jetson Center for Youth in East Baton Rouge Parish.

== Aftermath ==
John DeSantis of The Houma Times wrote, "Residents of local communities reeled from news of the case, horrified by the children's deaths." Visitations of their bodies occurred at Falgout Funeral Home in Lockport, and their funeral was held at the St. Hilary of Poitiers Catholic Church in Mathews. Another memorial service occurred at Victory of Life Church in Lockport. They were buried at Resurrection Memorial Park in Mathews.

The 501(C)(3) Camille and Braxton Hebert Memorial Fund Inc. was used to establish recreational areas/playgrounds at Lockport Lower and Lockport Upper. The playground at Lockport Lower has the text "Braxton's Buddies". Camille's Court, at Lockport Upper, was scheduled to be a basketball court decorated with a plaque and flowerbed. Scholarships in the names of both children for education major students were established at Nicholls State University.

== See also ==
Cases of filicide attributed to revenge against an ex-spouse:

- John Battaglia
- Elaine Campione
- Murder of the Kumari-Baker sisters
- Dora Luz Buenrostro
- Charles Mihayo
- Aaron Schaffhausen
- Simon Peter Nelson
