= Andrea Yates =

American murder defendant (born 1964)

- Yates in 2001
- Born: Andrea Pia Kennedy; July 2, 1964 (age 62); Houston, Texas, U.S.
- Status: Institutionalized
- Spouse: Rusty Yates (m. 1993; div. 2005)
- Children: 5 (Note: Noah Jacob b. February 26, 1994 (aged 7 at death) John Samuel b. December 15, 1995 (aged 5 at death) Paul Abraham b. September 13, 1997 (aged 3 at death) Luke David b. February 15, 1999 (aged 2 at death) Mary Deborah b. November 30, 2000 (aged 6 months at death))
- Motive: Postpartum psychosis Schizophrenia
- Penalty: 2002: Life imprisonment with the possibility of parole after 40 years (overturned 2005)
- Outcome: Found not guilty by reason of insanity in 2006 retrial

Details
- Date: June 20, 2001; 25 years ago
- Killed: 5

Andrea Pia Yates (née Kennedy; born July 2, 1964) is an American woman from Houston, Texas, who drowned her five children in their bathtub on June 20, 2001. The case of Yates—who had exhibited severe postpartum depression, postpartum psychosis, and schizophrenia in the years leading up to the murders—placed the M'Naghten rules, along with the irresistible impulse test for sanity, under close public scrutiny in the United States.

At Yates' 2002 trial, Chuck Rosenthal, the district attorney for Harris County, asked for the death penalty. Yates was convicted of capital murder, but the jury refused the death penalty option. She was sentenced to life in prison with the possibility of parole after forty years. The verdict was overturned on appeal, in light of false testimony by a prosecution witness, forensic psychiatrist Park Dietz.

On July 26, 2006, a Texas jury in her retrial found that Yates was not guilty by reason of insanity. She was consequently committed by the court to the high-security North Texas State Hospital in Vernon, where she received medical treatment and was a roommate of Dena Schlosser, another woman who committed infanticide by killing her infant daughter. In January 2007, Yates was moved to Kerrville State Hospital, a low-security state mental hospital in Kerrville, Texas.

== Background ==
Andrea Yates was born Andrea Pia Kennedy in Houston, Texas, the youngest of the five children of Jutta Karin Koehler, a German immigrant, and Andrew Emmett Kennedy, whose parents were Irish immigrants. Yates suffered from bulimia and depression during her teenage years, and at age 17 spoke to a friend about suicide.

Yates graduated from Milby High School in 1982. She was the class valedictorian, captain of the swim team, and an officer in the National Honor Society. Yates then completed a two-year pre-nursing program at the University of Houston and graduated from the University of Texas Health Science Center at Houston.

From 1986 until 1994, Yates worked as a registered nurse at the University of Texas MD Anderson Cancer Center. In summer 1989, she met Russell "Rusty" Yates, a NASA engineer, at the Sunscape Apartments in Houston. They soon moved in together and were married on April 17, 1993.

Yates and her husband, a devout evangelical Christian, announced that they "would seek to have as many babies as nature allowed" and bought a four-bedroom house in Friendswood, Texas. Their first child, Noah, was born in February 1994, just before Rusty accepted a job offer in Florida, causing them to relocate to a small trailer in Seminole. By the time of the birth of their third child, Paul, they had moved back to Houston and purchased a GMC motor home.

Following the birth of her fourth child, Luke, Yates's depression resurfaced. On June 16, 1999, Rusty found her shaking and chewing her fingers. The next day, she attempted suicide by overdosing on pills, leading to her being hospitalized and prescribed antidepressants. Soon after her release, Yates begged Rusty to let her die as she held a knife up to her neck. Once again hospitalized, she was given several medications, including Haldol, an anti-psychotic drug. Yates's condition improved immediately, and she was prescribed it upon her release. After this incident, Rusty moved the family into a small house for the sake of her health. She appeared temporarily stabilized.

In July 1999, Yates had a nervous breakdown, which culminated in two suicide attempts and two psychiatric hospitalizations that summer. She was subsequently diagnosed with postpartum psychosis.

Yates's first psychiatrist, Dr. Eileen Starbranch, testified that she urged her and Rusty not to have any more children, as it would "guarantee future psychotic depression." They conceived their fifth and final child approximately seven weeks after her discharge. Yates stopped taking Haldol in March 2000 and gave birth to her daughter, Mary, eight months later on November 30, 2000.

Yates seemed to be coping well until the death of her father on March 12, 2001. She then stopped taking medication, mutilated herself, read the Bible feverishly, and stopped feeding Mary. She became so incapacitated that she required immediate hospitalization. On April 1, 2001, Yates came under the care of Dr. Mohammed Saeed; she was treated and released. On May 3, 2001, she degenerated back into a "near catatonic" state and filled the bathtub in the middle of the day; she would later confess to police that she had planned to drown the children that day but had decided against doing it then. Yates was hospitalized the next day after a scheduled doctor visit; her psychiatrist determined she was probably suicidal and assumed she had filled the tub to drown herself.

== Murders ==
At the time of the murders, the Yates family was living in the Houston suburb of Clear Lake City. Yates continued under Dr. Saeed's care until June 20, 2001, when Rusty left for work, leaving her alone to watch the children against Dr. Saeed's instructions to supervise her around the clock. Rusty's mother, Dora Yates, had been scheduled to arrive an hour later to take over for Andrea. In the space of that hour, Andrea Yates drowned all five children.

Yates started with Paul, Luke, and John and then laid them in her bed. She then drowned Mary, whom she left floating in the tub. Noah came in and asked what was wrong with Mary. He then ran, but Yates soon caught and drowned him. She left him floating in the tub, and laid Mary in John's arms in the bed. She then called the police, repeatedly saying she needed an officer but refusing to say why. She then called Rusty and told him to come home right away.

== Trials ==
Yates confessed to drowning her children. Prior to her second trial, she told Michael Welner that she waited for Rusty to leave for work that morning before filling the bathtub because she knew he would have prevented her from harming them. After the murders, police found the family dog locked up; Rusty advised Welner that it had normally been allowed to run free, and was so when he had left the house, leading the psychiatrist to allege that she locked it in a cage to prevent it from interfering with her killing the children one by one. Rusty got a family friend, George Parnham, to act as her attorney.

Prior to her trial, Yates rejected an offer to plead guilty in exchange for a life sentence. Although the defense's expert testimony agreed that Yates was psychotic, Texas law requires that, in order to successfully assert the insanity defense, the defendant must prove that they could not discern right from wrong—in the sense of legal "right from wrong" not "moral" right from wrong—at the time of the crime. In March 2002, a jury rejected the insanity defense and found Yates guilty. Although the prosecution had sought the death penalty, the jury refused that option. The trial court sentenced Yates to life imprisonment in the Texas Department of Criminal Justice with eligibility for parole in forty years.

On January 6, 2005, a Texas Court of Appeals reversed the convictions, because California psychiatrist and prosecution witness Dr. Park Dietz admitted he had given materially false testimony during the trial. In his testimony, Dietz had stated that shortly before the murders, an episode of Law & Order had aired featuring a woman who drowned her children and was acquitted of murder by reason of insanity. Author Suzanne O'Malley, who was covering the trial for O: The Oprah Magazine, The New York Times Magazine, and NBC News, had previously been a writer for Law & Order and immediately reported that no such episode existed. The appellate court held unanimously that the jury might have been influenced by Dietz's false testimony, and therefore a new trial would be necessary (Law & Order: Criminal Intent did air an episode two years later based in part on Yates's case).

On January 9, 2006, Yates again entered pleas of not guilty by reason of insanity. Her lawyers rejected a plea offer for a 35-year sentence for non-capital murder. On February 1, 2006, she was granted release on bail on the condition that she be admitted to a mental health treatment facility. On July 26, 2006, after three days of deliberations, Yates was found not guilty by reason of insanity, as defined by the state of Texas. She was thereafter committed to the North Texas State Hospital–Vernon Campus. In January 2007, she was moved to the Kerrville State Hospital, a low security mental facility in Kerrville, Texas.

Although psychiatrists for both the prosecution and the defense agreed that Yates was severely mentally ill with one of several psychotic diseases at the time she killed her children, the state of Texas asserted that she was, by legal definition, aware enough to judge her actions as right or wrong—despite her mental defect. The prosecution further implied spousal revenge as motive for the killings, despite the conclusion of defense experts that there was no evidence to support such a motive. Although the original jury believed she was legally aware of her actions, they disagreed that her motive was spousal revenge.

=== Rusty Yates ===
According to trial testimony in 2006, Dr. Saeed had advised Rusty Yates not to leave his wife unattended. However, Rusty began leaving her alone with the children in the weeks leading up to the drownings for short periods of time, apparently believing it would improve her independence, despite her doctors' instructions. Rusty had announced at a family gathering the weekend before the drownings that he had decided to leave Yates home alone for an hour each morning and evening, so that she would not become totally dependent on him and his mother for her maternal responsibilities.

Andrea Yates's brother, Brian Kennedy, claimed during a broadcast of CNN's Larry King Live that Rusty expressed to him in 2001, while transporting her to a mental treatment facility, that all depressed people needed was a "swift kick in the pants" to get them motivated. Her mother expressed shock when she heard of Rusty's plan while at the gathering with them, saying Yates wasn't stable enough to care for the children. She noted that Yates demonstrated she wasn't in her right mind when she nearly choked Mary by trying to feed her solid food.

According to authors Suzy Spencer and Suzanne O'Malley, who investigated her story in great detail, it was during a phone call Dr. Saeed made to Rusty during the breaking news of the killings that Saeed first learned that she was not being supervised full time. Yates's first psychiatrist, Dr. Starbranch, says she was shocked to disbelief when, during an office visit with the couple, they expressed a desire to discontinue her medications so she could become pregnant again. She warned and counseled them against having more children, and noted in the medical record two days later: "Apparently patient and husband plan to have as many babies as nature will allow! This will surely guarantee future psychotic depression." Nevertheless, Yates became pregnant with her fifth child, Mary, only seven weeks after being discharged from Dr. Starbranch's care on January 12, 2000.

Rusty stated to the media he was never told by psychiatrists that Yates was psychotic or that she could harm the children, and that, had he known otherwise, he would have never had more children. He believed that his wife was "sick" and could be cured by medication; he had no idea the extent of her condition. "If I'd known she was psychotic, we'd never have even considered having more kids," he told the Dallas Observer." However, Yates revealed to her prison psychiatrist, Dr. Melissa Ferguson, that prior to their last child, "she had told Rusty that she did not want to have sex because Dr. Starbranch had said she might hurt her children." Rusty, she said, simply asserted his procreative religious beliefs, complimented her as a good mother and persuaded her that she could handle more children.

O'Malley highlighted Rusty's continuing sense of unreality regarding having more children:

During the trial, he'd successfully maintained the position that Yates would be found innocent. He had fantasies of having more children with her after she was successfully treated in a mental health facility and released on the proper medication. He worked his way through various fixes for their damaged lives, such as a surrogate motherhood and adoption (horrifying her family, attorneys, and Houston psychiatrists), before giving in to reality.

=== Medical community ===
Rusty contended that as a psychiatrist, Dr. Saeed was responsible for recognizing and properly treating Yates's psychosis, not a medically untrained person like himself. He claimed that, despite his urging to check her medical records for prior treatment, Dr. Saeed had refused to continue her regimen of the anti-psychotic Haldol, the treatment that had worked for her during her first breakdown in 1999:

Rusty testified that he never knew that she had visions and voices; he said he never knew she had considered killing the children. Neither did Dr. Saeed, even though the delusions could have been found in medical records from 1999. [...] [After her release from Devereaux,] Dr. Saeed reluctantly prescribed Haldol, the same drug that worked in a drug cocktail for her in 1999. But after a few weeks, he took her off the drug, citing his concerns about side effects. [...] Though Andrea's condition seemed to be worsening two days before the drownings, when her husband drove her to Saeed's office, Rusty testified, the doctor refused to try Haldol longer or return her to the hospital.

[...]

[Outside the courthouse after the verdict, Rusty said,] "The real question to me is: How could she have been so ill and the medical community not diagnose her, not treat her, and obviously not protect our family from her."

Rusty added that his wife was too sick to be discharged from her last stay in the hospital in May 2001. He said he noticed the staff lower their heads as if in shame and embarrassment, turning away without saying a word. The hospital had no other choice due to the ten-day psychiatric hospitalization insurance constraints of their provider, Blue Cross Blue Shield, subcontracted by Magellan Health Services.

=== Anti-depressants and homicidal ideation ===
Rusty and his relatives claimed a combination of antidepressants improperly prescribed by Dr. Saeed in the days before the tragedy were responsible for Yates's psychotic behavior. According to Dr. Moira Dolan, executive director of the Medical Accountability Network, "homicidal ideation" was added to the warning label of the antidepressant drug Effexor as a rare adverse event in 2005. Yates, she said, had been taking 450 mg, twice the recommended maximum dose, for a month before killing her children.

Dr. Lucy Puryear, an expert witness hired by Yates's defense team, countered this contention regarding the administration of her antidepressants, saying the dosages prescribed by Dr. Saeed are not uncommon in practice and had nothing at all to do with her re-emergent psychosis. She suggested rather that Yates's psychosis returned as a result of the Haldol having been discontinued by her doctor two weeks earlier. The oral form of Haldol takes 4–6 days after discontinuation to reach a terminal plasma level of under 1.5%—a medical standard for "complete" elimination of a drug from the body.

=== Religious influences ===
Media outlets alleged that Michael Woroniecki, an itinerant preacher whom Rusty had met while attending Auburn University, bore some responsibility for the deaths due to certain teachings which were found in his newsletter titled The Perilous Times, which the Yates family had received on occasion, and which was entered into evidence at the trial.

Both Woroniecki and Rusty have rejected these accusations. Rusty said that his family's relationship with Woroniecki was not that close and that Woroniecki did not cause her delusions. Woroniecki maintained that his correspondence with them was intended to help them strengthen their marriage and find the love that he says his own family had found in Jesus. Both men agreed that the alleged connection between his message and her mental state was "nothing more than media-created fiction."

While in prison, Yates stated that she had considered killing the children for two years, adding that they thought she was not a good mother and claiming that her sons were developing improperly. She told her jail psychiatrist: "It was the seventh deadly sin. My children weren't righteous. They stumbled because I was evil. The way I was raising them, they could never be saved. They were doomed to perish in the fires of hell."

== Divorce ==
In August 2004, Rusty filed for divorce, stating that he and Yates had not lived together as a married couple since the day of the murders. The divorce was granted on March 17, 2005, after which Rusty began dating Laura Arnold. They married on March 25, 2006, and had one son. Arnold filed for divorce in 2015.

== Advocacy work ==
The Yates Children’s Memorial Fund (YCMF) was founded by Yates' attorney and friend George Parnham and his wife, Mary Parnham, to provide education and awareness regarding the plight of postpartum mental illness. The organization is now under Postpartum Support International as the PSI Yates Children Memorial Fund Justice and Advocacy Program. The program aims to support families and professionals involved with cases concerning perinatal mental illness in the legal system.

== See also ==
Other cases of filicide in Texas:

- Darlie Routier
- John Battaglia
- Killing of Joshua and Luke Laney
- Ronald Clark O'Bryan
- Dena Schlosser
- Yaser Abdel Said
- Maggie Young – another woman like Yates who drowned her five children in a bathtub
- Khoua Her - another mother who was compared to Yates

Other cases of filicide elsewhere in the United States:

- Killing of the Clancy children – another case attributed to postpartum psychosis

== Sources ==
- Bienstock, Sheri L. Mothers Who Kill Their Children and Postpartum Psychosis, (2003) Vol. 32, No. 3 Southwestern University Law Review, 451.
- Keram, Emily A. The Insanity Defense and Game Theory: Reflections on Texas v.Yates (2002), Vol. 30, No. 4, Journal of the American Academy of Psychiatry and the Law, p. 470.
- Miceli, Barbara. "Infanticide and the Symbolism of Evil in Joyce Carol Oates's 'Dear Husband'", in Anglica, An International Journal of English Studies, 29/1, 2020, pp. 75–85.
- O'Malley, Suzanne, "Are You There Alone?", The Unspeakable Crime of Andrea Yates ISBN 0-7434-6629-2
- Spencer, Suzy, Breaking Point; ISBN 0-312-93871-3
- Vatz, R.E. "Will Justice Be Served on Andrea Yates?", USA Today (March 2005)
