= Dena Schlosser =

American murder defendant (born 1969)

- Born: Dena Leitner; 1969 (age 56–57); New York, U.S.
- Education: Marist College
- Criminal charge: Capital murder (acquitted by reason of insanity)
- Spouse: John Schlosser
- Children: 3 (including Margaret Schlosser)

Dena Schlosser (/ʃlɑːsər/ (née Leitner, born 1969) is an American woman who lived in Plano, Texas, who, on November 22, 2004, used a knife to amputate the arms of her ten-month-old daughter, Margaret, and then decapitated her.

== Early years ==
At the age of eight, Dena Leitner was diagnosed with hydrocephalus. She had eight surgeries to implant shunts into her brain, heart and abdomen before she was 13 years old. She graduated from Marist College in Poughkeepsie, New York, with a bachelor's degree in psychology.

She met her husband, John Schlosser, when they were both students at Marist. Eventually they moved to Texas. In 2004, when Margaret was born, John and Dena had two older daughters, aged 6 and 9.

== Leading up to murder ==
Dena gave birth to her daughter Margaret in 2004. The day after Margaret was born, Schlosser attempted suicide, was hospitalized in a psychiatric ward, and was diagnosed with bipolar disorder with psychotic features. Six days after Margaret's birth, a Child Protective Services (CPS) case was opened after Schlosser was seen running down the street, leaving Margaret and her two daughters alone in their apartment. In response, Schlosser was hospitalized and agreed to see a psychiatrist and get counseling. CPS ordered that she could not be alone with her children and her sister-in-law came to live with them until CPS lifted the order.

Dena Schlosser came to believe that Margaret was destined to marry Doyle Davidson, a veterinarian who had become their pastor. The day before she attacked Margaret, Schlosser told her husband that she wanted to give Margaret to Davidson. Later that day, according to a confidential CPS report, John spanked Dena with a wooden spoon in front of their children.

== Margaret's death ==
On the day of the murder, Dena's husband called a day care center, asking them to check on his wife and daughter. Concerned day care workers called 911 and in response a 911 operator called the Schlosser home. The operator testified that Dena confessed to cutting Margaret's arms off, with the gospel song "He Touched Me" playing in the background. When police arrived they saw Dena calmly sitting down, covered in blood, holding the knife, and singing Christian hymns. Margaret was found with fatal injuries in her crib, and Dena had attempted to remove her own arm in tribute. Hours after her arrest, police heard her repeatedly chanting, "Thank you, Jesus. Thank you, Lord."

== Trial ==
Psychologist David Self testified that Schlosser told him about a disturbing news story she had seen. The news story concerned a boy who was mauled by a lion and she interpreted it as a sign of the coming apocalypse. She said that she heard God commanding her to remove Margaret's arms and then her own. The attack was later described as "religious frenzy".

During the trial, much attention was drawn to Schlosser and her husband attending Water of Life Church, a charismatic church pastored by Davidson. She had been taking antipsychotic drugs for several years prior to Margaret's death. Davidson thought that mental illness was demonic and this belief partly led Schlosser's husband to not buy her medication regularly. Under oath, Davidson testified that in his view, all mental illness is demonic at bottom. Due to viewer outcry after the trial, Davidson's television ministry was canceled everywhere outside the Metroplex.

After nine minutes of deliberation, a jury found Schlosser not guilty by reason of insanity. She was committed to the North Texas State Hospital and until she is deemed to no longer be a threat to herself or others. There, she was a roommate of Andrea Yates, a Texas woman who had drowned her five children in a bathtub.

== Aftermath ==
After Schlosser's arrest, her remaining children were taken by CPS and kept in foster care. CPS said they would only allow her husband to regain custody of them under the condition that his sister live with the family, and he was required to complete psychotherapy and parenting classes. He received full custody of his daughters and raised them as a single father. He subsequently filed for divorce. As part of the divorce settlement, Schlosser was prohibited from ever having contact with him or their daughters again.

On November 6, 2008, it was announced that Schlosser would shortly be released into outpatient care. The order required her to see a psychiatrist once a week, take medication, be on physician-approved birth control, and not have any unsupervised contact with children.

In April 2010, it was reported that Schlosser was recommitted after firefighters from Richardson saw her walking down the street at 2:00 a.m. Her attorney, David Haynes, said that he felt the judge made the correct decision.

Schlosser was later released to outpatient status. She stayed out of the public eye until 2012, when WFAA-TV in Dallas reported that she was working under her maiden name, Leitner, at a Walmart in Terrell. Within hours, they fired her.

As of December 2020, Dena Schlosser was ordered to remain committed to a state hospital.

== In the media ==
Schlosser was briefly seen in the 2005 documentary The God Who Wasn't There, which is critical of Christianity.

There is also a segment about Schlosser in an August 23, 2013, episode of Deadly Women called "Evil Guardians".

== See also ==
- Murder of Zachary Turner
- Filicide in Texas:
  - John Battaglia
  - Deanna Laney murders
  - Darlie Routier
  - Andrea Yates
  - Yaser Abdel Said
