= Elaine Campione =

Canadian murderer

Frances Elaine Campione
- Elaine Campione and her daughters, Serena and Sophia (undated)
- Occupations: Nanny and other
- Spouse: Leo Campione (divorced)
- Children: Serena and Sophia Campione
- Status: In prison
- Motive: Bitter custody battle
- Conviction: First degree murder (both counts)
- Criminal charges: First degree murder
- Penalty: Life imprisonment

Details
- Victims: Serena and Sophia Campione
- Date: October 2, 2006
- Locations: Barrie, Ontario

Frances Elaine Campione is an Ontario woman who murdered her two children in Barrie, Ontario, on October 2, 2006. Canadian prosecutors argued that she wanted to get revenge on her ex-husband and was afraid he would receive custody.

== Background and crime ==
Elaine Campione originated from Coles Island, New Brunswick, living there until she moved to Ontario for work reasons at around age 20. She had attended home support classes at a community college for one year. Christie Blatchford of The Globe and Mail wrote that she had "a normal enough childhood". She went to Ontario to work as a nanny and she had other jobs.

Elaine and then-husband Leo Campione, whom she met in 2000, lived in Bradford, Ontario. The two parties divorced and leading to Leo moving out of the house. The victims, Serena and Sophia, were three years and nineteen months old, respectively, at the time of their deaths.

At the time of the incident, Campione only lived with her children in the Coulter Glen Apartments in northern Barrie. Blatchford wrote that Leo and Elaine Campione were "engaged in a nasty divorce and custody battle". Leo accused Elaine of providing their children substandard conditions at her apartment and asked the authorities for more access to the children and the appointment of a children's lawyer about one week before the deaths. Leo Campione stated that there had been a "mental breakdown" on the mother's end of the part.

On October 2, 2006, Elaine Campione killed the girls by immersing them in a bathtub of water in their house, causing them to drown. She filmed a video addressed to her ex-husband with different segments before and after her daughter's death. Jessica Owen of Village Media described the video as "lengthy". When the drownings were finished, Campione dressed them in pajamas and jewelry, posed them on a bed with objects, and attempted suicide.

== Prosecution and aftermath ==
The Crown (Ontario authorities) charged her with two counts of first degree murder. Mary Cremer served as Campione's lawyer.

The trial took seven weeks. Campione's lawyer argued that she was not criminally responsible by reason of mental disorder; they did not dispute that she had killed the girls.

On November 15, 2010, she was convicted. The jury decided that she was guilty as she knew murder was wrong, despite any presence of mental illness. Campione was sentenced to life imprisonment with a minimum tariff of 25 years. Leo Campione read a victim impact statement.

Campione filed appeals against her conviction in 2010. In 2015, some of them were denied. In 2019, the Parole Board of Canada allowed her to have escorted absences from prison.

== See also ==
Cases of filicide in Canada:

- Allyson McConnell

Cases of filicide attributed to revenge against an ex-spouse:

- John Battaglia
- Amy Hebert
- Murder of the Kumari-Baker sisters
- Charles Mihayo
- Aaron Schaffhausen
- Simon Peter Nelson
