= Yaser Abdel Said =

Egyptian-American murderer and former fugitive (born 1957)

- Photograph of Said taken in 2006

FBI Ten Most Wanted Fugitive
- Charges: Unlawful Flight to Avoid Prosecution; Capital Murder – Multiple
- Reward: $100,000
- Alias: Yaser Abdel Fattah Mohammad Said; Yaser Abdel Saeed

Description
- Born: January 27, 1957 (age 69); El-Arish, Sinai, Egypt
- Gender: Male
- Height: 6 ft 2 in (1.88 m)
- Weight: 180 lb (82 kg)
- Occupation: Taxi driver (former)
- Spouse: Patricia Owens (m. 1987; div. 2009)
- Children: 4
- Criminal information
- Disappeared: January 1, 2008 - August 26, 2020
- Motive: Belief that his daughters had dishonored the family

Details
- Victims: Amina Said; Sarah Said
- Date: January 1, 2008; 18 years ago c. 7:00 – 8:00 pm CST

Status
- Convictions: Capital murder of multiple persons
- Penalty: Life imprisonment without the possibility of parole
- Added: December 4, 2014
- Caught: August 26, 2020
- Number: 504
- Captured

Yaser Abdel Said (Arabic: ياسر سعيد; born January 27, 1957) is an Egyptian convicted murderer. On January 1, 2008, Said fatally shot both of his daughters. Both of their bodies were found in his abandoned taxi cab in Irving, Texas. Said went into hiding, evading arrest for 12 years. He remained a fugitive from law enforcement for the duration of his hiding, and for six of those years, he was on the FBI Ten Most Wanted Fugitives List.

Said, who was very controlling over his family, felt that his daughters Amina and Sarah dishonored the family, primarily due to them dating non-Muslims, as well as for refusing to enter arranged marriages. On January 1, 2008, he lured them into his taxi cab on the pretense of taking them out to eat, where instead, he fatally shot them.

Said was captured on August 26, 2020, in the town of Justin, Texas. His son, Islam, and Said's brother, Yassein, were both arrested in Euless, Texas, for aiding a fugitive. Said was taken into federal custody by the FBI, and was then transferred to Dallas County where he was held until his trial, which commenced in August 2022. Said was found guilty on August 9 after a week-long trial and was sentenced to life in prison without the possibility of parole. As of April 2024 Said is imprisoned at the McConnell Unit located near Beeville, Texas.

== Background and family ==
Said was born in Arish, Egypt. He came to the U.S. on a student visa in 1983. Said met Patricia "Tissie" Owens in when he was 29 and she was 14. After three weeks of dating, they married in February 1987 with the permission of her parents. Patricia later alleged that Said abused her during their marriage. Amina was born in 1989, and Sarah was born in 1990. The couple also had a son named Islam Said, born in 1988, and Said also had a previous daughter, born in 1987, with another woman. Said later became a permanent resident, eventually gaining citizenship in 1997.

== Abuse of Amina and Sarah ==
According to reports, the girls had stated that their father physically and sexually abused them. Amina told authorities she had been penetrated at least once and confirmed that their mother knew about the situation but did nothing to stop it.

Said would often spy on his daughters by video or audio-taping them without their knowledge. Amina stated she was afraid of using the public telephone "because he [Said] gets in everywhere, he knows everything". She also wrote in emails that her father intended to kill her. When she was 16, Said took Amina to Egypt allegedly to arrange a marriage for her to a much older friend of his, but Amina rejected the marriage.

Sarah got an after-school job working in a convenience store. Said began video-taping her at work and punished her for smiling too much at the customers.

Amina began dating a boy named Joseph Moreno, whom she met while taking Taekwondo classes. When Said was out of the country, she felt anxious about meeting Moreno, imagining that Said would be watching her with binoculars. Amina told Moreno not to call or text her if she sent a code word to him because she was afraid that her father would go through her phone. Eventually, Said found a note that she had written to Moreno. Amina told him that these notes were to an imaginary boyfriend. Said, not trusting Amina, continued his search in order to uncover Amina's relationship.

Said moved his family 20 miles (32 km) to a new house in Lewisville, Texas, prompting Amina to make plans to run away with Moreno, get married in Las Vegas, and start a new life. Moreno then dropped out of high school in order to earn money, so that he could save up enough money in order to help her leave. Moreno also stated that Said "regularly threatened to kill Amina, and she knew he meant it." Amina was worried that Moreno would be killed by her father, and she refused to give her father his name while she was beaten, following Said's persistent accusations.

On December 21, 2007, two weeks prior to her murder, Amina sent an email to her teacher telling her that her and her sister were running away saying her father "made our lives a nightmare” and "He will, without any drama nor doubt, kill us.”

== Murders of Amina and Sarah ==
After finding out his daughters had boyfriends, Said put a gun to Amina's head and threatened to kill her, prompting Patricia Owens and her daughters to flee on Christmas Day 2007. With the two girls boyfriends, they were able to rent an apartment in Tulsa, Oklahoma, where Amina's boyfriend had relatives.

Said, after having inundated Patricia with phone calls (from himself and other relatives) that were initially unsuccessful, eventually convinced her to return home with the girls on December 31, 2007. Patricia allegedly told her daughters that December 31 was her mother's death anniversary and that she wanted to drive to East Texas to put flowers on her grave. When Patricia communicated this change of plans to her daughters, Sarah reluctantly agreed to return, while Amina refused, ultimately seeking refuge in her friend's house. Patricia drove to the friend's house and pounded on the door, starting an argument with Amina to try to convince her to return to Said. Amina still refused to go. Patricia insisted and stood unmoved in the doorway, saying that her father had forgiven her and would like the girls to return home.

On January 1, 2008, Yaser Said took Amina and Sarah to his taxi cab, kissed them, and told them he was taking them out to eat. Patricia initially wanted to come along, but Said told her that he wanted to talk to the girls himself. He drove them both to Irving, where he shot both girls to death in the taxi cab. Amina, who was shot twice, died instantly, while Sarah, who sustained nine shots, managed to call 911 before she died, screaming "Help, my dad shot me! I'm dying, I'm dying!"

Said's taxi was soon discovered by another cab driver outside the service entrance of the Omni Mandalay Hotel (now the Omni Las Colinas Hotel).

== Aftermath ==
Said disappeared and although it was first assumed he fled to Egypt, no such record was ever found. After the murders, Owens turned over a green ammo box belonging to Said to the Irving Police Department. According to Detective Randall Johnson, the lead detective on the case, some of the 9mm bullets in the case matched the shell casings found at the murder scene.

Owens filed for divorce in 2009. Alleged sightings of Said driving a taxi in New York City and in Newark, New Jersey, prompted the FBI to issue a statement suggesting he could be in the area.> On December 4, 2014, Said was added to the FBI Ten Most Wanted Fugitives with a $100,000 reward for any information leading to his arrest. Said evaded capture by law enforcement for 12 years and spent six years on the FBI's Ten Most Wanted list.

== Capture ==
A break in the case came on August 14, 2017, when a maintenance worker at an apartment complex in Bedford, Texas, where Yaser's son, Islam Said, rented an apartment, reported seeing a man matching Yaser's description inside of Islam's apartment. When detectives showed him a picture of Yaser Said, the worker identified him as the man he had seen in the apartment. At approximately 6:30 p.m. that evening, an agent came into the apartment to interview Islam. He was upset and allegedly refused to cooperate. He then called someone, saying, "We have a problem." At 1:00 a.m., a search warrant was executed on the apartment, which was empty at the time. However, the police observed a sliding glass patio door open. Below the patio, they noticed a shrub with broken branches, suggesting someone had jumped off the patio and landed on the bush. Next to the flattened bush, they found a pair of eyeglasses, which they collected as evidence. They collected evidence inside the apartment, including several cigarette butts and a toothbrush. The FBI Laboratory in Quantico, Virginia, compared the DNA from those items to the DNA of Amina and Sarah, and determined the DNA most likely came from their biological father.

Three years later, in August 2020, the police began 24-hour surveillance on a home in Justin, Texas. They observed Islam and Yassein entering and exiting the home and the shadow of another man inside the home after the two men had left. After a week of surveillance, the FBI obtained a search warrant and arrested Yaser on August 26, 2020. On the same day in nearby Euless, Texas, they also arrested Islam, age 32, and Yassein Abdulfatah Said, age 59. Said's son and brother were both charged with concealing a person from arrest. Authorities suspect that other people helped Said evade arrest over the years, and a federal criminal complaint said that Islam was in contact with two more of his father's brothers.

== Criminal proceedings ==
=== Yaser ===
Even though Yaser Said was indicted on capital murder charges, prosecutors did not seek the death penalty. After his capture, he was held at Dallas County Jail - North Tower. His trial opened on August 2, 2022. Said argued through a translator that he was not present during the murders, having taken his daughters in his taxi for a ride and that there was a threat following them that made him leave, leaving his two daughters alone as Said had thought he was a target. After hearing closing arguments and three hours of deliberation, the jury found Said guilty of capital murder. Dallas County District Court Judge Chika Anyiam sentenced Said to life in prison without the possibility of parole. As of January 2023, he is incarcerated at Texas Department of Criminal Justice's McConnell Unit in Bee County, Texas.

=== Islam ===
On January 19, 2021, Islam Yaser-Abdel Said pleaded guilty to harboring a fugitive, conspiring to harbor a fugitive, and one count of conspiracy to obstruct justice. On April 27, 2021, he was sentenced to 10 years in federal prison for the aforementioned charges. As of January 30, 2023, he is serving his sentence at Federal Correctional Institution, Big Spring.

=== Yassein ===
According to his defense, Yassein Abdulfatah Said claimed that he hated Yaser for what he did and that he would never have helped him if he had known what would happen. On February 4, 2021, he was found guilty of conspiracy and harboring a fugitive. He was sentenced to 12 years in federal prison on June 4, 2021. As of December 23, 2024, he is serving his sentence at Federal Correctional Institution, Bastrop.

== In popular culture ==
The Price of Honor is a 2014 documentary about the murders of Sarah and Amina Said.

In 2015, The Hunt With John Walsh profiled the killings and Yaser Said's fugitive status.

== See also ==
- Honor killings in the United States:
  - Sandeela Kanwal
  - Noor Almaleki
  - Ali Irsan (killed Gelareh Bagherzadeh and Coty Beavers)
  - Murder of Tina Isa
- Filicide in Texas:
  - John Battaglia
  - Deanna Laney murders
  - Ronald Clark O'Bryan
  - Darlie Routier
  - Dena Schlosser
  - Andrea Yates
- Other notable family child abuse cases:
  - Turpin case
  - Ruby Franke
  - Vallow-Daybell doomsday murders
  - Susan Smith
