= Aaron Schaffhausen =

American murderer

- Spouse: Jessica Schaffhausen (2000-div. 2012)
- Children: Amara Schaffhausen (2000–2012); Sophie Schaffhausen (2003–2012); Cecilia Schaffhausen (2007–2012)
- Status: In prison
- Motive: Revenge against ex-partner
- Conviction: First degree intentional homicide (3 counts)
- Penalty: 3 life sentences without the possibility of parole

Details
- Victims: Amara, Sophie, and Cecilia Schaffhausen (his daughters)
- Date: July 10, 2012
- Location: River Falls, Wisconsin
- Weapons: Knife and hands

Aaron Schaffhausen is an American convicted murderer. He murdered his three daughters at their home in River Falls, Wisconsin in 2012.

== Background ==
Aaron and Jessica Schaffhausen married in 2000 and both filed for divorce in 2011; the divorce was finalized in January of the next year. Jessica, who had primary physical custody, lived with their daughters, Amara, Sophie, and Cecilia in a house in River Falls that they rented from Aaron, while he lived in Minot, North Dakota. The two parties had joint custody. Amara and Sophie attended Greenwood Elementary School.

== Crime ==
On July 10, 2012, Aaron sent a text message to Jessica requesting a visit to their daughters. She was not present at the house, and the babysitter left after he arrived. He slit the girls' throats with a knife. He also strangled Cecilia. They were 11, 8, and 5. He later called Jessica to tell her that he had killed them. A can of gasoline was spilled onto the ground.

Aaron turned himself in at a police station in River Falls. He was charged with three murders and attempted arson. His bond was set to $2 million.

== Trial and punishment ==
On March 29, 2013, Aaron entered a "guilty but insane" plea. Prosecutors accused him of killing the girls to get revenge against Jessica. He stated that this was indeed his motive, but that he did not know right from wrong due to a mental issue. He also pleaded guilty to attempted arson. According to prosecutors, he disliked that Jessica was romantically involved with someone else, and he had resentment over the divorce.

In April 2013 a jury ruled that Aaron was sane when he committed the murders. Jurors took three and a half hours to conclude that he knew right from wrong despite his mental issues. Howard Cameron, the St. Croix County judge, gave him three life sentences without parole, one for each victim. In 2014 Cameron also made him pay over $14,000 in restitution to Jessica; about one-fourth of the money given by his family and any money he earns while in prison will be garnished and given to Jessica. In addition he was asked to pay witness costs of $10,000. In 2015 one of his appeals was denied. He was housed in the St. Croix County Jail during his trial. He entered the Wisconsin Department of Corrections in July 2013.

== Aftermath ==
The girls' funeral was held at the Kilkarney Hills Golf Club in River Falls on Tuesday, July 17, 2012.

Affinity Plus Federal Credit Union acquired the house where the murders took place. Details Construction dismantled it, and its materials were donated to St. Croix Habitat for Humanity. The credit union used the money generated from the sale of the land to fund a park built in honor of the girls. The Tri-Angels Playground at Hoffman Park, accessible to handicapped children and built with designs referring to each of the girls, opened in 2015.

Jessica remarried and had children with her new husband.

== See also ==
- List of homicides in Wisconsin

Cases of filicide attributed to revenge against an ex-spouse:

- John Battaglia
- Elaine Campione
- Amy Hebert
- Murder of the Kumari-Baker sisters
- Charles Mihayo
