= KSH =

KSH or ksh may refer to:

- Kenyan shilling (KSh), the currency of Kenya
- Kerrville State Hospital (KSH), a mental hospital in Kerrville, Texas, USA
- Kodeks spółek handlowych (KSH), article 183, the Commercial Companies Code of Poland, governing Polish limited liability corporations, the Spółka z ograniczoną odpowiedzialnością (Sp. z o.o.)
- KornShell (ksh), a Unix shell developed by David Korn in the early 1980s
- Kölsch language (ISO 639-3 language code: ksh), a Ripuarian dialect spoken in Germany
- Központi Statisztikai Hivatal (KSH), the Hungarian Central Statistical Office
- Potassium hydrosulfide (chemical formula: KSH)
- Shahid Ashrafi Esfahani Airport (IATA airport code: KSH), in Kermanshah, Iran

== See also ==
- Kash Patel (personal monogram: K$H; born 1980), U.S. politician, 9th director of the FBI
