= Park Dietz =

American forensic psychiatrist (born 1948)

- Born: Park Elliot Dietz; August 13, 1948 (age 78); Camp Hill, Pennsylvania, US
- Education: Cornell University (BA); Johns Hopkins University (MD, PhD, MPH)
- Occupation: Psychiatrist
- Years active: 1978–present
- Employer(s): Park Dietz & Associates, Inc; Threat Assessment Group, Inc. UCLA School of Medicine; Forensic Sciences Unit, New York State Police; Critical Incident Response Group, National Center for the Analysis of Violent Crime
- Known for: Forensic psychiatry Expert testimony in high profile criminal cases

Park Elliot Dietz (born August 13, 1948) is a forensic psychiatrist who has consulted or testified in many high-profile US criminal cases, including those of spousal killer Betty Broderick, mass murderer Jared Lee Loughner, filicide defendant Andrea Yates, and serial killers William Bonin, Jeffrey Dahmer, Ted Kaczynski, Richard Kuklinski, Joel Rifkin, and Arthur Shawcross.

He came to national prominence in 1982 during his five days of testimony as the prosecution's expert witness in the trial of John Hinckley Jr., who had attempted the assassination of President Reagan on March 30, 1981. Then an assistant professor of psychiatry at Harvard Medical School, Dietz testified that at the time of the shooting, Hinckley knew that his actions were wrong and had the capacity to control his behavior, and was therefore not legally insane. He now heads a forensic consulting firm, Park Dietz & Associates, and founded the world's first workplace violence prevention company, Threat Assessment Group, Inc.

== Early life and education ==
Dietz was born on August 13, 1948, and raised in Camp Hill, Pennsylvania, a suburb of Harrisburg. His mother Marjorie Dietz had trained as a nurse and did hospital volunteer work, including activities at a local mental institution. His father Raymond Dietz was a physician, as was Dietz's grandfather.

Dietz graduated from Camp Hill High School in 1966 and that same year enrolled at Cornell University to major in Psychology and Biology. He was a member of Cornell's Theta Delta Chi fraternity. In 1970 he graduated with an A.B. cum laude in Psychology, and was a Phi Beta Kappa.

In 1970, Dietz received a senatorial scholarship to study at the University of Pittsburgh School of Medicine, transferring in 1972 to Johns Hopkins University. There, he was among a handful of students in the M.D.-Ph.D. Program in Behavioral Sciences funded by the National Institute of General Medical Sciences and the Grant Foundation of New York. From 1972 to 1975, while completing medical school and course requirements for a Ph.D. in Social Relations, Dietz also earned a Master of Public Health (MPH) degree.

Dietz worked with the school's noted public health professor Susan Baker on a study of drowning cases and their prevention and epidemiology, using the Haddon Matrix paradigm to categorize specific prevention measures for specific injuries. In 2012, Baker wrote that Dietz, "later applied the Matrix to the problem of rape, showing its value in formulating approaches to intentional injury ... and the Haddon Matrix probably played a role in his development of an entire industry addressed to workplace violence prevention."

== Early career ==
After completing his residency in general psychiatry at Johns Hopkins in 1977 and fellowship in forensic psychiatry at the University of Pennsylvania in 1978, Dietz began teaching at Harvard Medical School, where at age 29 he was the school's youngest assistant professor. While teaching at Harvard, Dietz also was the director of forensic psychiatry at Bridgewater State Hospital, a facility for the criminally insane in Bridgewater, Massachusetts.

After four years at Harvard, Dietz became an associate professor at the University of Virginia in 1982, teaching law, behavioral medicine, and psychiatry at the UVA School of Law while also being the medical director at UVA's Institute of Law, Psychiatry and Public Policy. He taught on the Charlottesville campus for six years, and was promoted to Professor of Law in the School of Law and Professor of Behavioral Medicine and Psychiatry in the School of Medicine.

== Significant contributions ==
Dr. Dietz has authored over 100 publications and consulted and/or testified in hundreds of criminal and civil cases. In addition to academic positions, Dr. Dietz has held hospital and administrative appointments; served on institutional committees, national public policy task forces, editorial boards for peer-reviewed scientific journals, and as a technical advisor for numerous TV series and films. In 2010, Dietz was awarded the "Seymour Pollack Award for Distinguished Contributions to Education in Forensic Psychiatry" by the American Academy of Psychiatry and the Law. In 2014, Biography.com listed Dr. Dietz among the 10 most famous psychiatrists in history. Dr. Dietz is a past President of the American Academy of Psychiatry and the Law, a Distinguished Life Fellow of the American Psychiatric Association, and a Fellow of the American Academy of Forensic Sciences. He is a forensic psychiatrist for both the FBI's Behavioral Analysis Unit and the New York State Police Forensic Sciences Unit. He was a member of the National Academy of Sciences Committee on Trauma Research, has conducted numerous studies of sex offenders, mentally disordered offenders, and violent criminals, directed a five-year study for the National Institute of Justice on mentally disordered offenders who threaten and stalk public figures, and headed a two-year privately funded study of risks to the children and families of executives and other public figures. Dietz's contributions to scholarship on sexual behavior and offenses include publications on sexual sadism, sexual masochism, sex offenses against children, exhibitionism, and sex offenses generally. Additionally, Dr. Dietz has authored many works on workplace violence, the stalking of high-profile individuals, and forensic psychiatry as a discipline.

== John Hinckley Jr. trial ==
John Hinckley Jr. attempted to assassinate President Reagan outside Washington, D.C.'s Hilton Hotel on March 30, 1981, and Hinckley's 1982 trial included Dietz as an expert prosecution witness (while he still was teaching at Harvard). In his five days of testimony, Dietz told the jury that Hinckley told him that he felt shooting the president accomplished his goal of trying to impress actress Jodie Foster. Dietz quoted Hinckley as saying, "'Actually, I should feel good because I accomplished everything on a grand scale ... I did it for [Foster's] sake'".

Assistant U.S. Attorney Roger Adelman, the chief prosecutor, argued that Hinckley may have been emotionally unstable at the time of the shooting, but that he was not so mentally disturbed that he could not understand what he did when he shot Reagan. Dietz and the colleagues whom he led wrote the prosecution's 628-page report on Hinckley's mental state.

Dietz diagnosed Hinckley with personality disorders: narcissistic, schizoid, and a mixed personality disorder with passive-aggressive and borderline traits, plus persistent sadness. Hinckley had, according to the Dietz-authored report, "a pattern of unstable relationships; an identity disturbance ... chronic feelings of emptiness and boredom ... inability to sustain consistent work behavior ... lack of self-confidence." But Dietz also told the jury that none of these personality issues free Hinckley from legal responsibility for shooting Reagan. "On March 30, 1981, Mr. Hinckley, as a result of mental disease or defect, did not lack substantial capacity to appreciate the wrongfulness of his conduct."

Dietz used Hinckley's assessment of the assassination location, as Reagan walked outside the Hilton Hotel, as an example of how Hinckley did "appreciate the wrongfulness" of his actions, but nonetheless went forward. Dietz said Hinckley had a, "long-standing interest in fame and assassination", and that he had studied, "the publicity associated with various crimes".

Hinckley's mental health state was clear enough that he knew the type of bullet that would do the most damage, Dietz told the jury, plus the step-by-step movements needed to get close to Reagan on March 30. "He was able to make other decisions on that date", Dietz said. "He decided where to go for breakfast, what to eat ... He made personal decisions of that sort. ... He deliberated and made a decision to survey the scene at the Hilton Hotel. There was no voice commanding him to do that ... He decided, as he tells us, to go to the Hilton to check out the scene to see how close he could get." He also explained that Hinckley summarized, "the situation as having poor security ... He saw that the range was close and within the distance with which he was accurate, and at the precise moment that he chose to draw his revolver there was a diversion of attention from him ... The Secret Service and others in the presidential entourage looked the other way just as he was pulling the gun ... Finally, his decision to fire, thinking that others had seen him ... indicates his awareness that others seeing him was significant because others recognized that what he was doing and about to do were wrong."

Hinckley's defense team argued that he was schizophrenic and thus not criminally responsible for his actions. After eight weeks of testimony, the jury on June 21, 1982, found Hinckley not guilty on all 13 counts by reason of insanity, a verdict that so shocked the nation that Senator Arlen Specter held a hearing of the Senate Judiciary Committee to question the jurors and both the American Psychiatric Association and American Bar Association appointed task forces to work on a revised test of insanity to clarify federal law.

The trial catapulted Dietz into the national spotlight: attorneys took special note of his unique knowledge of deviant behavior, with the FBI also seeking his expertise. His concurrent teaching at the University of Virginia from 1982 to 1988 ended with Dietz moving to Southern California to start his forensic consulting firm.

== Threat Assessment Group, Inc. ==
In 1987, Dietz founded Threat Assessment Group, Inc. (TAG), a Newport Beach, California-based consulting firm focused on preventing and managing workplace violence. The firm grew out of his earlier public health research into intentional injury prevention, including his application of the Haddon Matrix, an injury-prevention framework, to violence-related harm. Public health researcher Susan Baker has written that this line of work "probably played a role in his development of an entire industry addressed to workplace violence prevention."

TAG was among the first firms devoted specifically to workplace violence prevention, and in 1993 began offering formal training in the field. The company is credited with helping originate the cross-functional "Threat Assessment Team" model, in which human resources, security, legal, and mental health professionals jointly evaluate and manage behavioral risk within an organization. This approach has since been adopted more broadly in corporate security and human resources practice.

Dietz continues to serve as TAG's founder and president, overseeing case consultation work performed by a team that includes forensic psychiatrists, psychologists, and former FBI profilers. TAG operates alongside Dietz's earlier firm, Park Dietz & Associates, which provides related forensic and litigation consulting services.

== Jeffrey Dahmer ==
Serial killer Jeffrey Dahmer murdered 17 boys and men from 1978 to 1991, all but one of them in Milwaukee, Wisconsin. Dietz was hired by the prosecution to evaluate Dahmer's claim that he was "guilty but insane". Dietz interviewed him for 18 hours, with the psychiatrist describing Dahmer as, "articulate, rational and motivated to speak the truth." During his two days of testimony, Dietz explained to the jury that Dahmer was not insane or driven to commit murder but, instead, had sexual disorders and exhibited sexually deviant behavior with his victims, but purposely drank himself to the point of intoxication when he killed. Dahmer, he said, also kept the skulls of 11 of his victims: far from being insane, Dietz said Dahmer, calmly and rationally, knew that keeping, "some of his favorite items, these keepsakes, [meant taking] a very big risk of being detected for all these serious crimes."

Dietz was impressed at how Dahmer remembered intricate details of each murder. The two men watched some of Dahmer's cinematic favorites including Star Wars: Return of the Jedi, The Exorcist III, plus gay pornography.

Dahmer also gave Dietz plans for a temple he wanted to build for most of the 11 victims' skulls that he kept, with plans to paint them. "Mr. Dahmer drew for me a diagram of what he had in mind—planned for the temple", Dietz told the jury. "And that diagram of the temple shows 10 skulls on a table, with incense burning on both ends, and two whole skeletons on either end of the black table ... and a special globe lamp to impart an eerie sense of lighting. And he wanted a black leather chair so that he could sit in the leather chair and admire his collection. If he did this, and had it set up this way, he ... could somehow get in touch with some spiritual force or power."

Both the Star Wars and Exorcist films had evil characters that inspired the temple, specifically the emperor in Return of the Jedi and the demon in The Exorcist III. "He identified with the characters", Dietz told the jury, "because he felt that he was thoroughly evil and corrupt."

At the conclusion of his 1992 trial, Dahmer was convicted of the 15 Wisconsin murders to which he had confessed, and received 15 life sentences.

== Andrea Yates ==
Dietz attracted considerable controversy following his testimony in the 2002 trial of Andrea Yates, a woman convicted of drowning her five children in a bathtub. Dietz was the prosecution's lone mental health expert, and testified that shortly before Yates committed the crime, the television crime drama franchise Law & Order had aired an episode about a woman who drowned her children and was found innocent by reason of insanity. However, no such Law & Order episode exists. When the error became known, Yates' murder conviction was overturned by an appeals court, on January 6, 2005. The negative publicity following the Yates trial led Dietz to be dropped as an expert from Marcus Wesson's murder trial.

== Waco ==
As the Waco siege went on, on April 16, 1993, FBI Director William Sessions tried to convince Attorney General Janet Reno to approve an assault on the complex, but she requested more documentation.

After Dietz prepared a written opinion stating that further negotiations were not likely to resolve the crisis, and that Koresh would likely continue abusing the children, that Attorney General Reno, who was known as a child advocate, approved the assault on April 17, 1993.

== The Meese Commission ==
Dietz was one of 12 people appointed in 1985 to President Reagan's Attorney General's Commission on Pornography, better known as The Meese Report after then-U.S. Attorney General Edwin Meese. The commission's final, 1,960-page, five-part, 35-chapter, report was published in July 1986. At the University of Virginia law school library's special collection department, the inventory of Dietz's papers includes 16 boxes dedicated solely to his work on the commission, covering a broad range of sexuality issues from nude sunbathing to bondage publications and Playboy magazine cartoons plus one box bearing a title with the now-antiquated phrase, "dial-a-porn".

In his personal statement in the commission's report, Dietz contrasted his commission work with his many years of studying the psychopathic behavior of killers, writing that when he joined the commission, "the morality of pornography was the farthest thing from my mind ... Thus, I was astonished to find that by the final meeting of the Commission, pornography had become a matter of moral concern to me. While other Commissioners may have learned things about the dark side of life that they had never known, I remembered something about the higher purposes of life and of humanity's aspirations that I had forgotten during too many years working on the dark side."

Dietz also stated in the final report, "In my opinion, we know enough now to be confident in asserting that a population exposed to violent pornography is a population that commits more acts of sexual brutality than it otherwise would and to suggest somewhat less confidently that the same is probably true of a population exposed to degrading pornography."

=== Meese Commission's 8-Point "Medical and Public Health" Problems Involving Pornography ===
Dietz's extensive commission statement outlined eight areas in which pornography creates, or helps foster, "a medical and public health problem". Surveying these issues, Dietz wrote, in part:

- On pornography impacting social behavior: "The person who follows the patterns of social behavior promoted by pornography is a person for whom love, affection, marriage, procreation, and responsibility are absolutely irrelevant to sexual conduct."
- Shaping personal attitudes that create adverse health consequences: "even in experimental samples of mentally stable male college students, exposure to violent pornography leads to measurable, negative changes in the content of sexual fantasies, attitudes toward women, attitudes toward rape, and aggressive behavior within the experimental setting".
- Sexual abuse: "Pornography of all types is used in the sexual abuse of children to instruct them on particular sexual acts and to overcome their resistance by showing them what adults do ... (and) to instruct women in the sexual behaviors that men desire of them (and) to harass women in the workplace and to remind them into whose world they are intruding". However, Dietz added, "there would be no straightforward remedies for these consequences short of reducing the quantity of pornography in circulation."
- Injury to people working in pornography: "they have been exposed to the risk of acquiring sexually transmitted diseases. Some have been supplied with narcotics".
- Sex toys: "Products under the pretext of health and recreation ... are the instruments of injury, both intentional and unintentional. People have suffocated in bondage hoods ... People have had 'sexual aid' devices entrapped in body cavities, requiring extraction at hospital emergency wards. People have died from orally ingesting volatile nitrites (which are) sold as aphrodisiacs."
- Urban concentrations of adult establishments such as bookstores, and strip bars/peep shows: "These establishments signal members of the community and visitors that full vice services may be available nearby through prostitutes and drug dealers and, if not so directly available, are a phone call away through the advertisements found in tabloids, periodicals, and sex-for-sale guides".
- Sexual disinformation: "So much of it (pornography) teaches false, misleading, and even dangerous information about human sexuality. A person who learned about human sexuality in the 'adults only' pornography outlets of America would be a person who had never conceived of a man and woman marrying or even falling in love before having intercourse ... Instead, such a person would be one who had learned that sex at home meant sex with one's children, stepchildren, parents, stepparents, siblings, cousins, nephews, nieces, aunts, uncles, and pets, and with neighbors, milkmen, plumbers, salesmen, burglars, and peepers".

Dietz also wrote that pornography is, "both causal and symptomatic of immorality and corruption. A world in which pornography were neither desired nor produced would be a better world, but it is not within the power of government or even of a majority of citizens to create such a world ... a great deal of contemporary pornography constitutes an offense against human dignity and decency that should be shunned by the citizens, not because the evils of the world will thereby be eliminated, but because conscience demands it."
