= Charles Mihayo =

Tanzanian murderer in prison in Melbourne, Australia

Charles Amon Mihayo
- Born: Tanzania
- Children: Savanna and Indianna Mihayo
- Status: Incarcerated
- Motive: Revenge against ex-wife
- Conviction: Murder
- Criminal charge: Murder
- Penalty: Life imprisonment

Details
- Victims: Savanna and Indianna Mihayo
- Date: 20 April 2014
- Location: Melbourne
- Weapon: Pillow

Charles Amon Mihayo is a Tanzanian man, permanently residing in Australia, who killed his two daughters in Melbourne on 20 April 2014.

== Background ==
Mihayo was born in Tanzania.

Miyaho met a woman in China, moved to Australia, and married her. He became a permanent resident of Australia. They separated in 2011 with divorce occurring a year later.

The murders were committed in Melbourne's north-eastern suburb of Watsonia, at a property on Longmuir Road just near the Greensborough Secondary College. The house in which the girls were murdered belonged to their maternal great-grandmother, Margaret Mills.

== Crime ==
On 19 April 2014, Mihayo sent a text message asking his wife to allow him to see his daughters "one last time." On the following day, which was Easter Sunday, Mihayo bought new clothes for the girls and visited them at the residence of their great-grandmother in Watsonia, Melbourne, Victoria.

Mihayo asked his daughters, Savanna and Indianna, to wear ballerina dresses and sing "Let It Go" from the 2013 American film Frozen. This was recorded on videotape. He also went to play hide and seek with them. He took them into a bedroom, smothered them with a pillow, and put them back into clothes after bathing them post-mortem. He confessed to killing them when police came to arrest him.

Gavin Silbert QC, the chief crown prosecutor, stated that Mihayo was upset since his ex-wife found a new romantic partner. He pleaded guilty in September 2014. He received a life sentence with a minimum tariff of 31 years.

== See also ==
Cases of filicide attributed to revenge against an ex-spouse:

- John Battaglia
- Elaine Campione
- Amy Hebert
- Murder of the Kumari-Baker sisters
- Aaron Schaffhausen
