= Murder of the Kumari-Baker sisters =

British double filicide case

Rekha Kumari-Baker
- Born: Rekha Kumari; 1967 or 1968 (age 58–59); India
- Occupation: Waitress
- Spouse: David Baker (former)
- Children: Davina and Jasmine Kumari-Baker
- Status: Murder
- Motive: Revenge against ex-partner
- Conviction: Murder
- Criminal charge: Murder
- Penalty: Life imprisonment (minimum tariff 33 years)

Details
- Victims: Davina and Jasmine Kumari-Baker
- Date: 13 June 2007
- Locations: Stretham, Cambridgeshire, England
- Weapon: Knives

Davina and Jasmine Kumari-Baker were murdered by their mother who stabbed them to death at their home in Stretham, Cambridgeshire, England, while they slept on 13 June 2007. Rekha Kumari-Baker was sentenced to life imprisonment with a minimum tariff of 33 years. In 2010 the BBC stated that the punishment was "one of the longest jail terms given to a woman in the UK in modern times."

== Murders ==
On the day of the murders, Rekha Kumari-Baker took her two daughters on a shopping trip to the Lakeside Centre, near Thurrock, Essex.

The older daughter Davina, aged 16, was killed first, with Kumari-Baker stabbing her 39 times. The younger daughter Jasmine, aged 13, was found dead in her bed stabbed 29 times. After the murder, Kumari-Baker called a friend of hers, who was a special constable, and admitted that she had murdered her children and said that she had "done something terrible".

The prosecutor stated that Rekha Kumari-Baker killed the girls as a form of revenge against her ex-husband and father of the girls, David Baker. Kumari-Baker had purchased kitchen knives, the murder weapons, from ASDA on 11 June.

Judge Mr Justice Bean said that Rekha Kumari-Baker desired to "retaliate against David Baker and destroy the happiness in his life", but also said that her motive could not be fully determined by investigators. He said that her defense was "flimsy and insubstantial". The jury took 35 minutes to convict her.

== Council review ==
Cambridgeshire County Council conducted a review into the murders and found they could not have been prevented and listed recommendations for social workers in relation to the review.

== See also ==
- Louise Porton – fellow British female double killer who murdered her two daughters in 2018

Cases of filicide attributed to revenge against an ex-spouse:

- John Battaglia
- Elaine Campione
- Amy Hebert
- Charles Mihayo
- Aaron Schaffhausen
