= Alberta Hospital Edmonton =

Psychiatric Hospital in Canada (1923-)

- Alberta Health Services
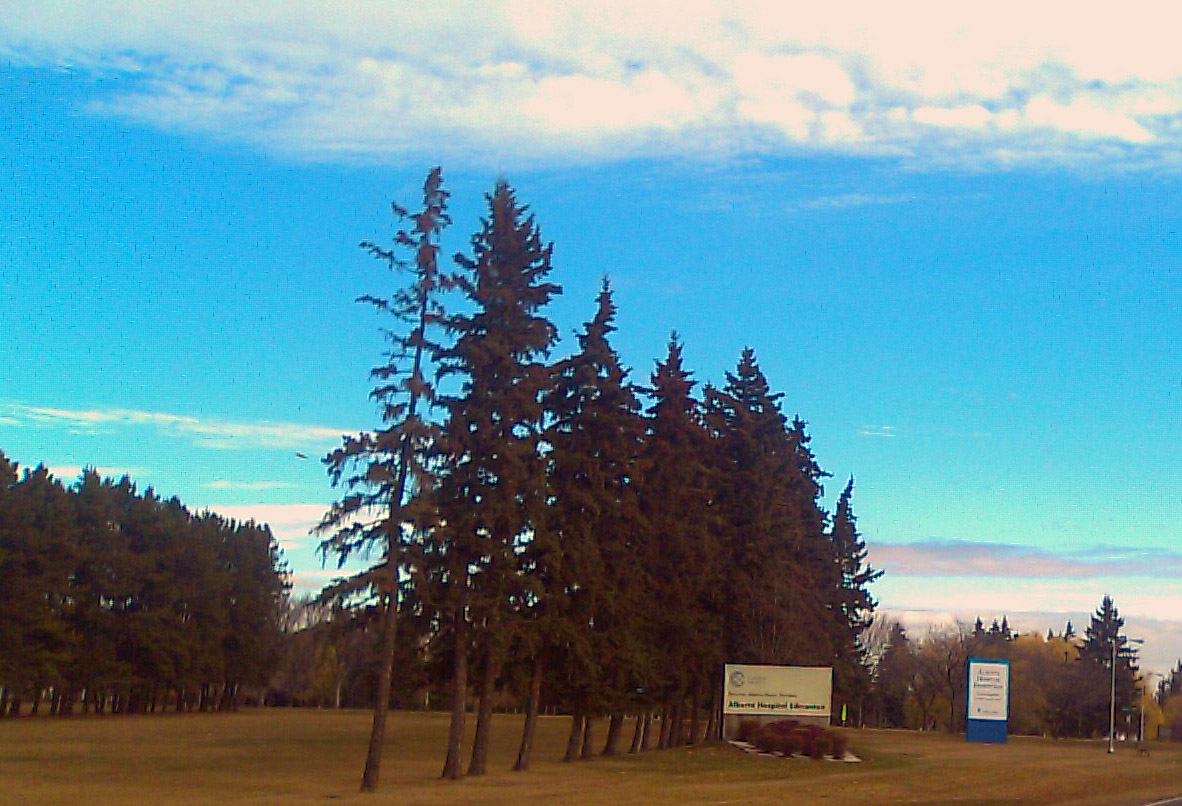
- Alberta Hospital Edmonton's main entrance, off of Fort Road

Geography
- Location: 17480 Fort Road, Edmonton, Alberta, Canada
- Coordinates: 53.6363°N 113.3733°W

Organization
- Care system: Epic System Medicare
- Type: Psychiatric

Services
- Emergency department: No
- Beds: 410

History
- Founded: 1923

Links
- Website: Alberta Hospital Edmonton
- Lists: Hospitals in Canada

Alberta Hospital Edmonton is a psychiatric hospital operating under the governance of Alberta Health Services. It is located in the northeastern portion of Edmonton, Alberta, Canada, and was founded on July 1, 1923. The site is serviced by Edmonton Transit Service bus route 121.

Admission and continuing treatment at Alberta Hospital Edmonton can be voluntary, formal under the Mental Health Act, or in the Forensic Psychiatry Program under the Criminal Code. Referral agents include physicians, mental health professionals, other health care facilities, community agencies, courts, corrections, police, and family, in addition to self-referral.

Each Alberta Hospital Edmonton program has an inpatient and a community component. Interdisciplinary teams are made up of program managers, psychiatrists, psychologists, psychometrists, nurses, psychiatric aides, social workers, occupational therapists, recreation therapists, physiotherapists, therapy assistants, counselors, pharmacists, dietitians, chaplains and support staff.

== History ==
=== Grand Opening ===
- Opened Sunday, July 1, 1923, as the "Provincial Mental Institute, Oliver". For many years, it was a World War I veterans hospital. The first 47 patients arrived in the summer of 1923 from the "Hospital for Returned Soldiers" (later known as Michener Centre) in Red Deer. All 47 patients were veterans of World War I who were mostly suffering from "shell shock," now known as Post-traumatic stress disorder (PTSD). The first physician caring for these veterans was Captain Dr. David L. Dick. He served with the Royal Army Medical Corps 142nd Field Ambulance in 1915-16 on the Western Front. In 1917, he was transferred to the Canadian Expeditionary Force and became Resident Medical Officer for the Strathcona Military Hospital, Edmonton.
- The Grand Opening was a significant event as these were veterans and the official hostess of the occasion was Bridget Velma Henderson, niece of Premier Herbert Greenfield, who later married World War I flying ace Stanley A. Puffer of the Royal Flying Corps. At the Grand Opening, luminaries in attendance included:
  - Dick Reid. the Minister of Health
  - Archie Matheson, the MLA from Vegreville
  - John Edward Brownlee, the Attorney-General

=== Recent History ===
In August 2009, Alberta Health Services announced that it will be closing 106 of the 410 beds at the hospital. The AUPE has been strongly opposed to the closures and have staged many protests and have made several television commercials at an attempt to gain support. Edmonton Zone Day Hospital opened in Building 12 on January 7, 2019.

== Buildings ==
There are 45 buildings at AHE spread over 275 acres (1.11 km^{2}). The buildings on the site were named numerically in the order in which they were built originally but now the order has no relevance.

1 Building

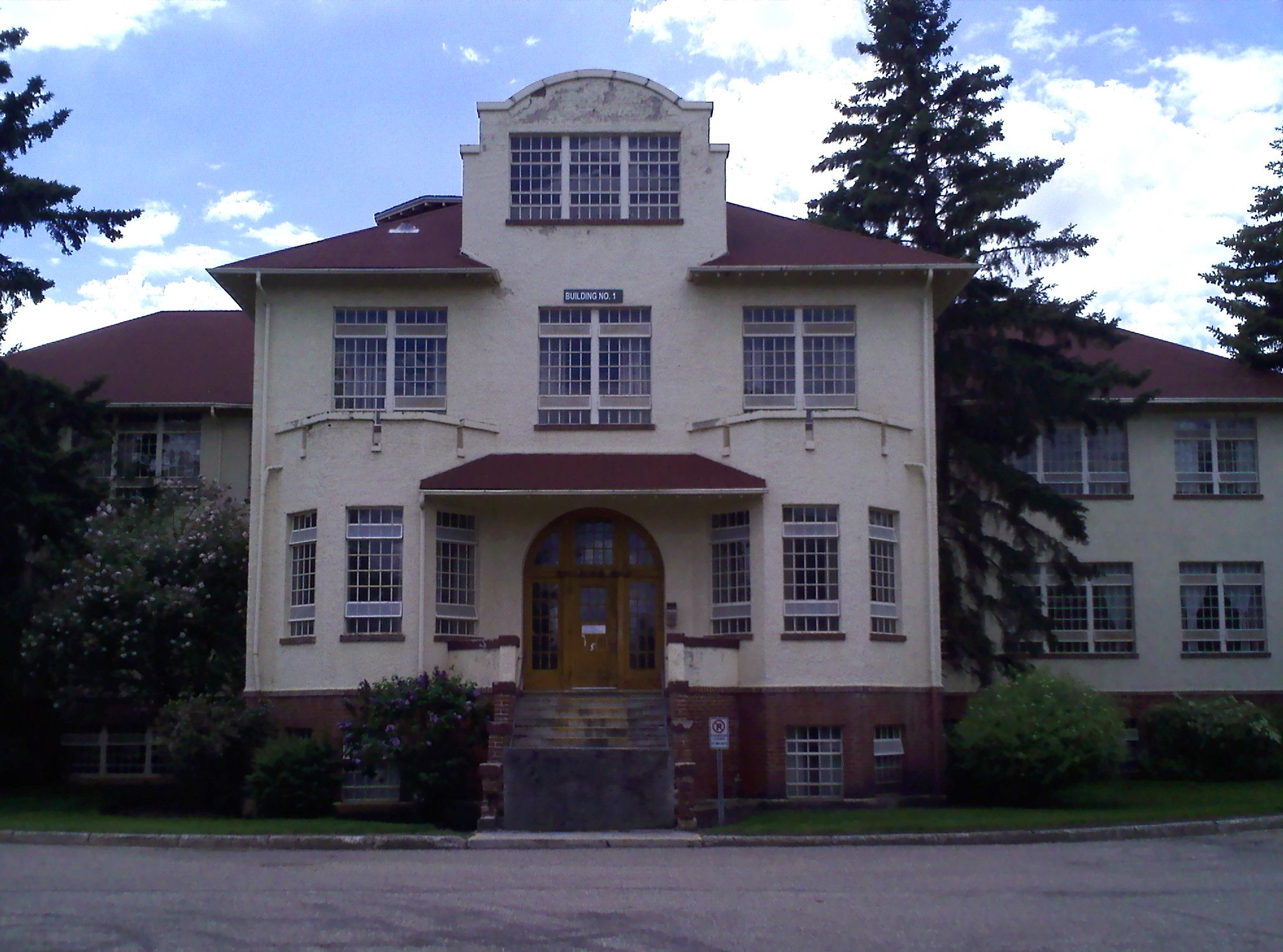
Building 1

- Originally the first dormitory
- contained the apparel shop and Highwood School until closed in 2006

2 Building

- Remains standing, but unused. It used to be a supplementary dormitory where numerous patients were also treated.

Old 3 Building

- Contained 2 units 3B and 3C
- Demolished and replaced with current 3 building

3 Building

- Helen Hunley Forensic Pavilion
- Contains X-ray and CT scanning equipment
- Dorran Auditorium
- Pool and gymnasium

4 Building

- Original building demolished, new building used as new food services which replaces old 17 building
- formerly held patients; following closure for patient care, became a dormitory for staff

5 Building

- Rose Sinclair Pavilion
- Not in use but still standing. Used to be the old Forensic Pavilion until Forensic Psychiatric Services moved to the now 3 Building.

6 Building

- Laundry

7 Building

- Woodwork shop
- Unused as building is condemned

8 Building

- Rachel H. Young Pavilion
- Contains Rehabilitation units; including the Specialized Treatment, Assessment and Rehabilitation Services (S.T.A.R.S.)
- Contains Budz Bistro (coffee shop run by patients as part of a patient program, but is now not in operation)

9 Building

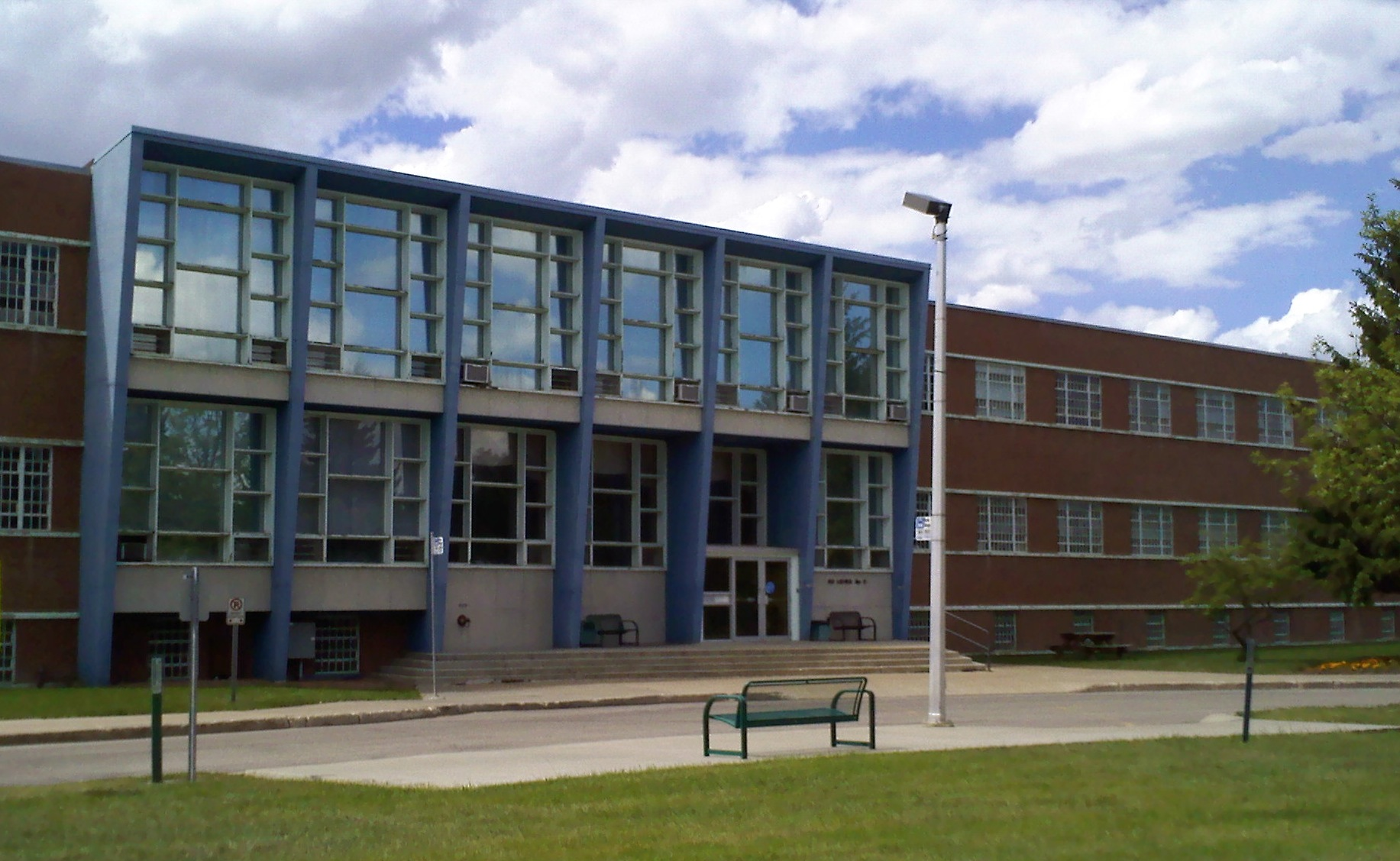
Building 9

- Contains library, pharmacy, pastoral/spiritual care, AV and computer lab
- Contains Central Services, Highwood School and Apparel Shop
- Contains Provincial Protective Services Communications Center
- Contains the Parking Call Centre for Alberta Health Services.

10 Building

- AD MacPherson Pavilion
- Houses Admitting and is part of the Adult Psychiatric Program.
- Contains 4 separate adult psychiatry units: unit 10-1, 10-1A, 10-2, and 10-2A
- unit 10-1 is an adult psychiatric intensive care unit

11 Building

- Cottonwood
- Remains standing but unused

12 Building

- AR Schrag
- ECT therapy
- Geriatric units used to reside here however have been moved to Villa Caritas
- Now has a young adults unit (12A) and the adult Day Hospital on the main floor of the building

14 Building

- Now demolished and replaced by a new Food Services building.

15 Building

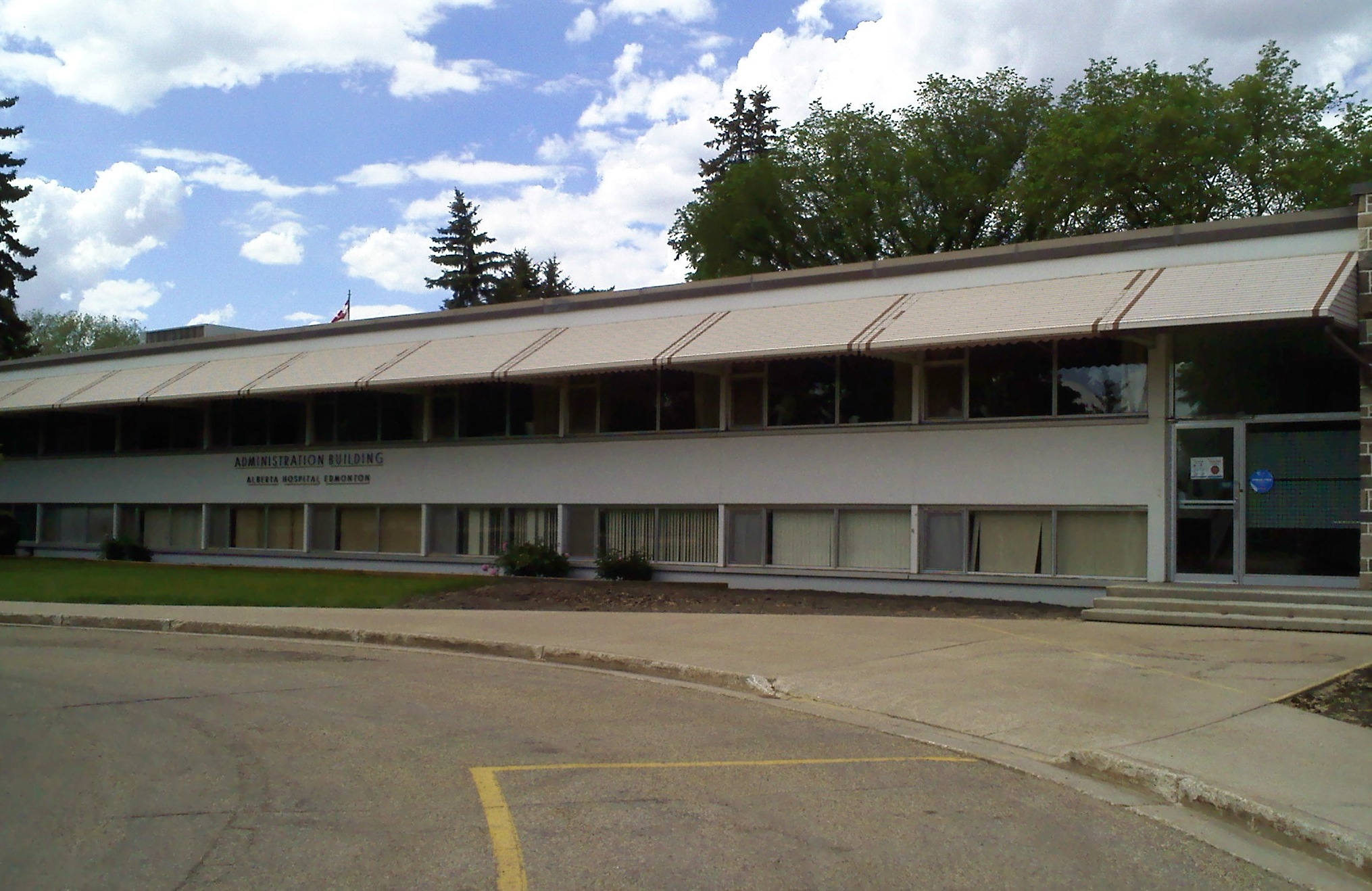
Administration building

- Administration and HR

16 Building

- Used to function as a Fire Hall when AHE had its own fire department, but has been since converted into a car wash, framing shop and bottle depot. 16 Building is run by staff but staffed by patients, who are taking part in patient programs.

17 Building

- Food and Nutrition Services, decommissioned for patient foods and replaced with new building 4 but maintained the cafeteria area.
- Sunshine Cafe

18 Building

- Power plant

19 Building

- Facilities management offices

20 Building

- Greenhouse and RSVP gift shop
- Originally patients were paid a small stipend for working in the greenhouse. However, this is no longer funded. In March 2016 a fire broke out and the building has sustained severe damage and is to be demolished. Temp greenhouse has been erected.

21 Building

- Stores/Receiving
- Patient Transportation
- Regional Surplus

Cameron Hall

- Demolished

Water Tower

- Due to its height, this structure is visible throughout the Alberta Hospital site and to the outlining area.

== Programs ==
- Adult psychiatry (Ages 18–65)
  - CLiP (The Community Living Program) provides support to psychiatric patients within the community upon discharge from the hospital
- The Northern Alberta Forensic Psychiatry Program
- Young Adults Acute Unit

== Notable patients ==
- Jasmine Richardson (Youngest person in Canadian history ever tried for triple murder)
- Allyson McConnell (Australian woman who killed her two children in Millet, Alberta)
