= Suzy Spencer =

American author and journalist

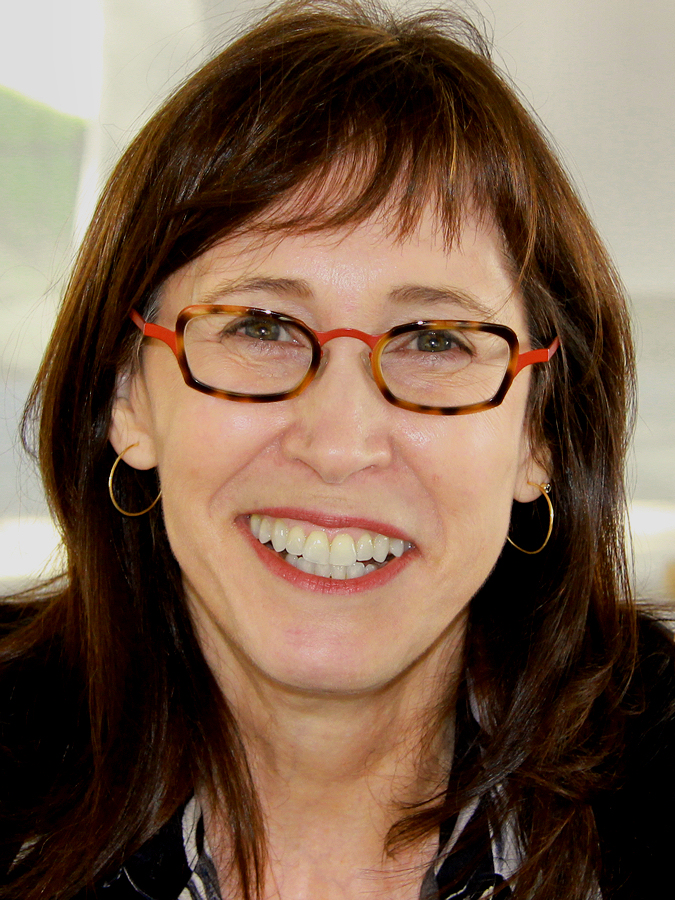
- Suzy Spencer at the 2012 Texas Book Festival
- Born: Lufkin, Texas, U.S.
- Education: Baylor University
- Occupation: Writer
- Years active: 1977–present
- Website: http://www.suzyspencer.com

Suzy Spencer is an American author and journalist who made the New York Times Best Seller list in 1998 with her first true crime book Wasted.

Since then, she has written three additional true-crime books. Her book about alternative sex, Secret Sex Lives: A Year on the Fringes of American Sexuality, was released in 2012.

== Early life and education ==
Spencer was born in Lufkin, Texas, where she graduated from Lufkin High School in 1972. She received a degree in journalism from Baylor University in Waco, Texas.

== Career ==
She moved to New York City and worked as a reporter/researcher for Fortune magazine. Two years later, Spencer was in Los Angeles freelance writing and completing an MBA in finance and marketing and a master's in professional writing from the University of Southern California.

Spencer has appeared on Good Morning America, ABC World News, Primetime, Dateline NBC, Fox News, CNN, MSNBC, Court TV, Oxygen, E! Channel, and Katie on ABC.

== Books ==
Her book Wasted about the 1995 murder of Regina Hartwell in Austin, Texas, made the New York Times Best Seller list in 1998.

In February 2002, St. Martin's Press released Spencer's book, Breaking Point, about Andrea Yates' murders of her five children. After the book's release, Spencer's press credentials to cover the Yates trial was revoked by the court and she sued. The court denied her request, so she stood in line each day with the general public for a daily spectator pass.

Spencer's memoir, Secret Sex Lives, released by Berkley Books in 2012, was featured at that year's Texas Book Festival.

Her book The Fortune Hunter was the basis of the 2021 Lifetime movie Secrets of a Gold Digger Killer starring Julie Benz.

== Reception ==
Spencer was called by ABC's PRIMETIME LIVE program Austin, Texas' best-known true crime writer. Her first four books each earned awards:

- Wasted was a New York Times bestseller and Violet Crown Book Award finalist;
- Wages of Sin was reissued by Kensington Books in December 2010, 10th anniversary of the book's publication;
- Breaking Point was a Book of the Month Club, Doubleday Book Club, Literary Guild and Mystery Guild selection;
- The Fortune Hunter was called "riveting" and "blockbuster" by the Globe
