= Ramon Salcido =

Mexican mass murderer on death row in the U.S. (born 1961)

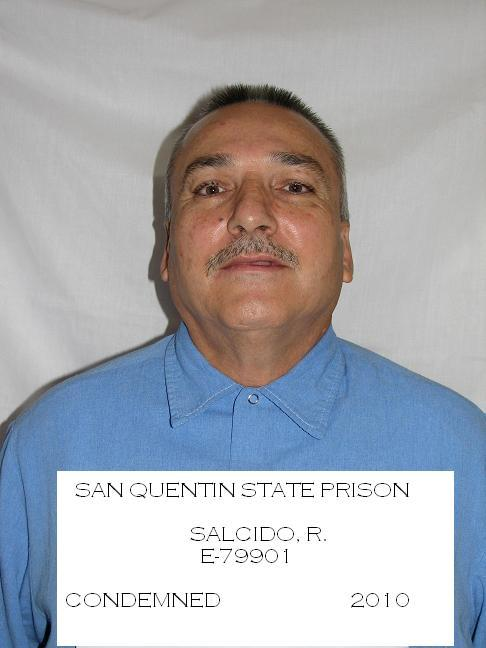
- Born: Ramon Bojorquez Salcido; March 6, 1961 (age 65); Los Mochis, Sinaloa, Mexico
- Occupation: Winery worker
- Convictions: First degree murder with special circumstances (6 counts); Second degree murder Attempted murder (2 counts)
- Penalty: Death; commuted to life imprisonment without parole

Details
- Date: April 14, 1989
- Locations: Sonoma and Cotati, California, United States
- Killed: 7
- Injured: 2
- Weapons: Knife; Ruger .22-caliber handgun

Ramón Bojórquez Salcido (born March 6, 1961) is a Mexican convicted murderer who is currently incarcerated at Richard J. Donovan Correctional Facility. He was convicted for a spree killing that took place on the night of April 14, 1989, in Sonoma County, California, in which he murdered six female family members, including his wife and two of their daughters, and a male co-worker.

In the late 2000s and early 2010s, the murders were the subject of several documentaries. The surviving daughter, Carmina Salcido, authored the 2009 memoir "Not Lost Forever" about the killings and her later life.

== Sonoma County murders ==
On April 14, 1989, after a night of drinking and snorting cocaine, Ramon Salcido drove his three young daughters to a county dump outside of Sonoma, California. Salcido slashed their throats, and threw them into a ditch. Two of them, four-year-old Sofia and 22-month-old Teresa were killed, while three-year-old Carmina survived with a slashed throat and rescued hours later. According to an autopsy report, the girls had all been molested prior to being cut.

Salcido then drove to Cotati, California, where he killed his mother-in-law and her two daughters by slashing their throats as well, with one of them being almost decapitated. He then returned to his home in Boyes Hot Springs, where he shot his wife, Angela Salcido, in the head twice, in the shoulder once, and missed with three other bullets.

Salcido then went to the Grand Cru winery, his place of employment, where he killed a co-worker, Tracey Toovey, by shooting him three times in the head and once in the arm. He then drove to the house of Kenneth Butti, another co-worker, and shot him in the right shoulder.

=== Arrest ===
Salcido fled after the killings to Mexico via Calexico. He was arrested in Guasave, Mexico, on April 19, 1989. When arrested, Salcido told police that he committed the murders because of financial difficulties, suspicions that his wife was having an affair with his coworker Tracy Toovey, and supposed mistreatment at his workplace. He also alleged that his in-laws made derogatory remarks against him for being Mexican.

== Victims ==
- Ángela Salcido, 24, wife of Ramon Salcido
- Sofía Salcido, 4, daughter of Angela Salcido
- Carmina Salcido, 3, daughter of Angela Salcido (survived)
- Teresa Salcido, 1, daughter of Angela Salcido
- Marion Louise Richards, 47, mother of Angela Salcido
- Ruth Richards, 12, daughter of Marion Richards
- Maria Richards, 8, daughter of Marion Richards
- Tracy Toovey, 35, winemaster at Grand Cru winery
- Kenneth Butti, 33, supervisor at the winery (survived)

== Trial and incarceration ==
Salcido's trial had been moved out of Sonoma County due to extensive news coverage of the case. On October 30, 1990, Salcido was found guilty by a jury of six counts of first-degree murder, one count of second-degree murder, and two counts of attempted murder. On November 16, 1990, Salcido was sentenced by a jury to the death penalty. Marteen Miller, Salcido's attorney, contended that his client was under the influence of cocaine and alcohol during the slayings. The defense had sought a verdict of second-degree murder or manslaughter under the circumstance that the drugs had put Mr. Salcido in a state of psychotic depression when the rampage began.

As of 2026, Salcido is incarcerated at Richard J. Donovan Correctional Facility. His death sentence was commuted to life imprisonment without parole on November 5, 2026, when Gavin Newsom commuted all of California’s death row inmates sentences.

== Media ==
Some media reports blamed macho culture for the murders, which has been characterized as cultural stereotyping of Latinos.

Investigation Discovery portrayed the Ramon Salcido case in the docudrama series "Evil I", episode: "Killer in the Sun", originally aired 2012.

The investigative reporting series ABC's 20/20 features exclusive interviews with survivor Carmina Salcido; the episode is titled 'What Happened to Carmina", originally aired in October 2009.

== See also ==
- List of homicides in California
- Capital punishment in California
- List of death row inmates in the United States
- Dora Luz Buenrostro
