= The Last Defense =

American television documentary series

- Genre: Documentary
- Country of origin: United States
- Original language: English
- No. of seasons: 1
- No. of episodes: 7

Production
- Executive producers: Viola Davis; Julius Tennon; Aida Leisenring; Vanessa Potkin; Christine Connor; Lee Beckett; Jeremiah Crowell; Gemma Jordan
- Editors: Anne Barliant; Adrian Murray; Benji Kast; Karim López; Mark Lechner; Peter Schmuhl; Rosella Tursi
- Camera setup: Multi-camera
- Production companies: Lincoln Square Productions; Xcon Productions; JuVee Productions

Original release
- Network: ABC
- Release: June 12 – July 24, 2018

The Last Defense is an American documentary series that explores and exposes flaws in the American justice system through emotional, in-depth examinations. The program ran for one season on the ABC television network during the summer of 2018.

The first season examines the death row cases of Darlie Routier and Julius Jones and seeks to trace the path that led both Routier and Jones to their places on death row, while taking a deep look into their personal stories. Jones' sentence has since been commuted to life without parole while Routier remains on death row.

== Episodes ==
No.	Title	Original release date	U.S. viewers (millions)
1	"Darlie Routier: The Crime"	June 12, 2018	N/A
A Dallas housewife is sentenced to death in 1997 for the murder of her two sons; her husband details the events leading to her arrest.
2	"Darlie Routier: The Trial"	June 19, 2018	N/A
Darlie Routier's trial begins; Darlie's firsthand account of what happened; defense experts examine theories.
3	"Darlie Routier: The Woman"	June 26, 2018	N/A
The prosecution presents a damaging video of Darlie having a party at her children's gravesite.
4	"Darlie Routier: The Fight"	July 3, 2018	N/A
After 21 years, Darlie's defense team explores alternative theories and lays out its strategy for a retrial; Darlie and Darin reveal the agony of love under a death sentence.
5	"Julius Jones: The Crime"	July 10, 2018	N/A
University of Oklahoma student Julius Jones is arrested for the shooting death of a businessman; interview with Julius' former coach; Julius tells his version of events.
6	"Julius Jones: The Trial"	July 17, 2018	N/A
The prosecution's star witness testifies he was there when Julius pulled the trigger; a critical piece of evidence is never seen by the jury; Julius' current lawyers give him hope.
7	"Julius Jones: The Fight"	July 24, 2018	N/A
New evidence comes to light, and a race to win a new trial for Julius Jones begins.
