= Dora Luz Buenrostro =

Mexican-American spree killer

Dora Buenrostro
- Known for: San Jacinto child murders
- Children: 3
- Status: Imprisoned
- Motive: To get back at her husband.
- Penalty: Death (Commuted); Life imprisonment without the possibility of parole

Details
- Victims: Susana Buenrostro, 9; Vicente Buenrostro, 8; Deidra Buenrostro, 4
- Date: October 25–27, 1994
- State: California
- Location: San Jacinto
- Target: Her children
- Weapons: Knives and a ballpoint pen
- Date apprehended: October 29, 1994

Dora Luz Buenrostro (born circa 1959–1960) is a Mexican-American spree killer who murdered her three children from October 25–27 in 1994, in an act of revenge against her husband, and attempted to frame him for it. She was sentenced to death for her crimes, making her the first woman sentenced to death in Riverside County, as well as one of the few Mexican female foreigners sentenced to death in the United States. Her sentence was later commuted to life imprisonment without parole and she awaits a new penalty phase.

== Background ==
Dora Buenrostro married her husband Alejandro Buenrostro in 1982. Dora worked as a file clerk and a translator. The marriage between her and her husband was turbulent, with reports of abuse from Dora of Alejandro beating her. In May 1994, she was granted a restraining order, with her husband prohibited from coming within 100 yards from her.

There were reports from a neighbor, of arguing and neglect going on between Dora and her children. Dora would leave her children and lock the apartment. The children would have to ask the neighbor to use their bathroom.

== Details ==
On October 27, 1994, around 6:00 A:M, Dora Buenrostro made a commotion as she ran into a police station saying her estranged husband, Alejandro Buenrostro, had been in her apartment and she was afraid for her children's safety. Authorities arrived at her apartment and found the bodies of two of her children being 9-year-old Susana Buenrostro and 8-year-old Vincente Buenrosto. The children were laid out on two different sofas with blankets covered on them and were discovered with their throats cut. They also had defensive wounds on their arms. A third child was missing from the scene, 4-year-old Deidra Buenrostro. An alert was put out for Alejandro, in hopes of rescuing Deidra. He was soon detained, but Deidra wasn't found in his vehicle. Around 7:00 P:M in Lakeview, two children told their babysitter that they found the body of a little girl inside an abandoned post office they explored. Not believing them, she followed the two and discovered the body. The little girl was strapped inside a bloody car seat and was described as having a hole in her neck. The babysitter called 9-1-1 and reported of the discovery. Authorities went to the location and identified the girl as Deidra Buenrostro.

=== Questioning and arrest ===
Both Dora and Alejandro were questioned in the murders of their children. Alejandro was let go after giving a credible alibi during the period of his children's deaths. Dora however, was arrested after giving conflicting information. During her arrest she was described as looking nervous before asking; “Well aren’t you going to check things out?”

== Legal proceedings ==
Dora was held on a $250,000 bail and was charged with murder with special circumstances, and was facing the death penalty.

A competency trial was held for Dora to prove if she was sane or not when she committed the murders. The jury found her competent to stand trial.

After four years, she stood trial for the murders of her children in 1998.

== Trial ==
Dora was soon sent to trial, where she maintained her innocence and stuck to her claim of Alejandro being responsible for the murders.

During the trial prosecutors were able to come up with a timeline for the murdered Buenostro children.

=== Timeline of the murders ===
==== Murder of Deidra Buenrostro ====
Between 5:00 and 6:30 PM on October 25, Dora was seen driving in her vehicle with Deidra, Vincente, and Susana. During this time, Dora asked to borrow $10 from one of her neighbors, telling them it was for gas money for a trip to Los Angeles to meet her husband. At this time, Dora was seen with Deidra in the vehicle. The older children weren't in the car since she left them behind at her home. It is believed between 6:30 P:M - 11:00 P:M as she drove from San Jacinto to Los Angeles, Dora would take Deidra, still strapped in her car seat, into the abandoned post office and stabbed her in the throat with a knife and ballpoint pen, killing her. During the stabbing, the knife broke off and became embedded in the little girl's throat. Dora would then abandon Deirda in the building.

==== Arriving at Alejandro’s residence ====
Dora, after murdering Deidra, arrived at Alejandro's residence in Los Angeles, around 11:00 P:M. During her time in the residence, Dora asked Alejandro if she could see his firearm. Alejandro emptied the gun before handing it to her, and then put it up. Afterwards he asked her if the children were ok, she replied they were fine. Afterwards they had sex and fell asleep afterwards. At some point during the night, Dora went to the kitchen and grabbed a steak knife and put on a red glove. She then approached Alejandro, who was still sleeping, while holding the blade. Alejandro woke up, and saw Dora standing over him, making slashing movements with the knife. During this, Dora asked Alex; “Why are you afraid of dying?” Dora continued to threaten Alejandro making comments about hurting him, during this, he called 911. Dora continued thrusting at him with the knife, but he was able to avoid the swings and fled outside. Police arrived at the residence around 1:15 a.m. and saw Dora standing at the entrance of the residence, still holding the knife. Dora complied with the authorities orders when they commanded her to drop the blade. Dora told the police she was there to pick up her daughter, Deidra, whom she accused Alejandro of taking earlier in the day. Authorities while at the residence didn’t see any sign of Deidra in the residence or in Dora's car. They did notice however a car seat was missing in her vehicle. Dora was then advised by the authorities to return to home and make a missing person report. Dora complied and drove off.

==== Murder of Susana and Vincente Buenrostro ====
One of Dora's neighbors testified at the trial. Dora and the neighbor shared a wall together. The neighbor awoke during the night after hearing a loud thump. The neighbor thought the noise was weird, didn't hear anymore noises coming from Dora's apartment that night. It is believed here, Dora would stab to death Susana and Vincente as they slept in the apartment. She would then run to the police station in an attempt to frame her husband.

==== Conviction and sentencing ====
Dora was found guilty of the murders of her children on July 24, 1998. After she was convicted, she reportedly lashed out at the officers, her defense attorneys, and the prosecutors. Dora was then sentenced to death on October 2, 1998.

==== Reversal of death sentence ====
In 2018, Dora's death sentence was reversed, but her conviction stayed in place, as she was resentenced to life imprisonment without parole. She awaits a new penalty phase.

== See also ==
- Darlie Routier
- Susan Smith - another case that happened around the same time
- Ramon Salcido
