= Affinity Plus Federal Credit Union =

US not-for-profit financial cooperative

- Formerly: State Capitol Credit Union
- Founded: 1930
- Headquarters: St. Paul, Minnesota
- Website: affinityplus.org

Affinity Plus Federal Credit Union is a Minnesota-based, not-for-profit financial cooperative with 29 branches and about $1.7 billion in assets. It serves more than 600,000 members with financial products and services including checking and savings accounts, consumer loans, mortgages, credit cards, investment accounts, retirement accounts, and more. The credit union is led by president and CEO Dave Larson, a position he has held since 2013.

== Eligibility ==
A person is eligible to join Affinity Plus if they, a family member, or a household member satisfy one of the following criteria:

1. Is an employee of:

- The State of Minnesota
- The University of Minnesota
- A Preferred Partner company
- Affinity Plus Federal Credit Union
- Any organization that receives funding from the State of Minnesota

2. Is a student or alumnus of any Minnesota State college or university or the University of Minnesota Twin Cities campus.

3. Lives, works, or worships in:

- Arden Hills
- Minneapolis (Downtown)
- Mounds View
- New Brighton
- Roseville
- Shoreview
- St. Anthony
- St. Paul (Downtown)
- White Earth Reservation

4. Is a dues-paying member of the Affinity Plus Foundation
