= North Texas State Hospital =

Psychiatric hospital in Texas, United States

The North Texas State Hospital (NTSH) in the US state of Texas was a trio of inpatient mental health facilities owned by the State and operated by the Texas Health and Human Service Commission's Health and Specialty Care System division. NTSH had three campuses, one in Wichita Falls and two in Vernon. The hospital was separated into two separate facilities, the Vernon State Hospital, and the Wichita Falls State Hospital on September 1, 2025.

== Wichita Falls campus ==
The Wichita Falls campus was a 330-bed facility that treated people with mental illnesses and intellectual disability after being screened by a local mental health facility (generally, a hospital or community mental health/intellectual disability facility). It is Medicare certified. Although not a maximum security facility, the campus is guarded, and buildings (which are not guarded) are constantly locked with very limited access.The facility opened in the 1920s and for years, Wichita Falls State Hospital was the name. Vernon State Hospital was added as an annex in the 1960s. In 1996, the state legislature merged these facilities into the North Texas State Hospital. In 2025, they were separated into distinct hospitals again.

=== New Hospital ===
In 2023, the 88th Texas Legislature set aside $425 million for the construction of a replacement hospital building that will be built behind the existing aged facilities, with construction to start summer 2024. The new facility will have 200 beds: 24 maximum-security, 136 non-maximum-security, 24 adolescent and 16 civil. Construction is estimated for completion in fall 2027. The plans for the existing hospital facilities are still being discussed.

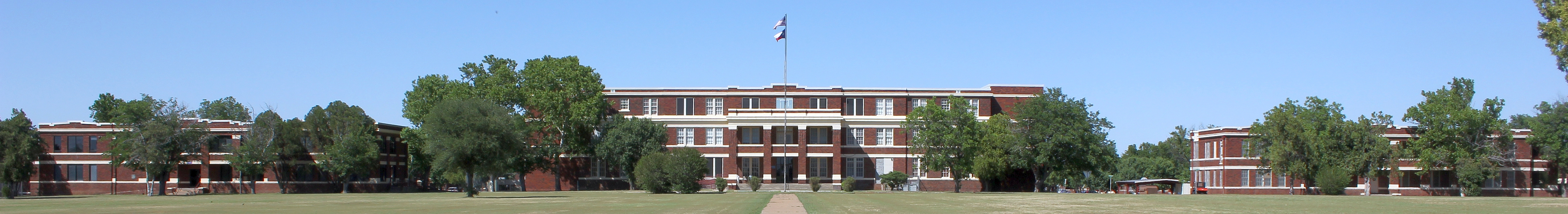
North Texas State Hospital in Wichita Falls

== Vernon campus ==
The Vernon campus has 262 adult beds and 32 adolescent beds. It is a maximum-security facility that services adults with criminal (forensic) issues.

The Vernon campus was mandated by the 70th Texas Legislature to provide services to six populations:

- Persons with felony charges who have been found incompetent to stand trial;
- Persons admitted for pre-trial evaluations for competency and issues of insanity;
- Persons found not guilty by reason of insanity;
- Persons from other state hospitals who have been found to be manifestly dangerous;
- Mentally disabled persons who have been found incompetent to stand trial on misdemeanor or felony charges;
- Persons from the Texas Department of Criminal Justice (TDCJ) and jails who need inpatient psychiatric hospitalization.

== Vernon Campus South ==
In January 2018 the NTSH re-opened the Victory Field location to house adolescents with dually-diagnosed substance abuse and mental health problems. Many of the clients are admitted as a condition of their probation, having had significant involvement with the juvenile justice system.

== Accreditation ==
North Texas State Hospital is accredited by the Joint Commission.

== Notable patients ==
- Andrea Yates
- Dena Schlosser
- Dimitrios Pagourtzis
