= Simon Nelson =

American mass murderer

- Born: Simon Peter Nelson; October 2, 1931; Rockford, Illinois, U.S.
- Died: June 18, 2017 (aged 85); Springfield, Illinois, U.S.
- Spouse: Ann Nelson
- Status: Deceased
- Motive: Revenge against wife over impending divorce
- Conviction: Murder (6 counts)
- Penalty: 100 to 200 years imprisonment

Details
- Date: January 7, 1978
- Country: United States
- States: Illinois and Wisconsin
- Targets: His children, wife, & family dog
- Killed: 6 (and a dog)
- Injured: 1
- Weapons: Knife; Rubber mallet

Simon Peter Nelson (October 2, 1931 – June 18, 2017) was an American mass murderer who was convicted of murdering his six children, aged 12 to 3, after his wife, Ann, said she wanted a divorce in 1978. He also killed the family dog. He was denied parole 18 times and died in prison.

== Early life ==
During his trial, Nelson claimed his father, who committed suicide in 1954, physically abused him as a child. He said he found his father's journal, in which the older man blamed his family for his "despondency." Nelson served in the U.S. Air Force in the early 1950s.

== Murders and trial ==
On January 7, 1978, in Rockford, Illinois, after Ann called him to say she wanted a divorce, Nelson used a knife and rubber mallet to kill his children, 12-year-old Jenny, 10-year-old Simon III, 8-year-old Andrew, 7-year-old Matthew, 6-year-old Roseann, and 3-year-old David, while they were asleep. He also slit the throat of the family dog, Pretzel, who was found lying between two of them. He then drove to Milwaukee and attacked Ann. As he was beating her, he told her that he had killed the children. Police arrested him midway through the attack.

Nelson's defense team pleaded not guilty by reason of insanity. He said he could not recall the killings, claiming he snapped when Ann called to say she didn't love him anymore and was divorcing him. His defense failed, and he was convicted of six counts of murder. The prosecution sought the death penalty, which had been reinstated in Illinois less than six months prior to the murders. Asking for mercy, Nelson's public defender said, "You have to remember that the decision you make today is one you will have to live with for the rest of your life. If electrocuting Simon Peter Nelson will bring back the children, then do it. Or will it be crueler to make Nelson think about every second, every minute, every hour, every day, every month, and every year for the rest of his life what he did? Yesterday I wouldn't ask for mercy. Today I do."

Nelson was spared execution by a lone holdout juror. The jury had voted 11–1 in favor of a death sentence, but the decision needed to be unanimous for a death sentence to be imposed. As such, Nelson was sentenced to six concurrent prison terms of 100 to 200 years, and officials recommended that he never be released from prison. Judge John Ghent told him, "Each day of your life you will recall the grisly nature of the murders, [so] this may not be the most agonizing punishment. Any sentence I give you might seem inadequate."

At his sentencing hearing, Nelson apologized:

"Words cannot express my deep sorrow and humble apology for the loss– the pain–the fear my actions have caused our community. Of the many concerns over the tragedy to my children and family, one is that child not be fearful of his parents [and that] the parents pause and reflect on their responsibility as adults to love and not abuse God's children, either in word or deed."

== Parole hearings ==
Under more lenient laws at the time, Nelson became eligible for parole after serving 11 years, but was denied parole 18 times over the remainder of his life.

At a parole hearing in 2004, Nelson said he had benefited from anger management therapy in prison and would never be violent again. He expressed remorse, saying "I almost feel guilty for the fact that I'm regaining my moral compass. I've put myself back together. The remorse that I feel gets deeper the more I learn about what the weaknesses were that allowed this to happen. If I could change history and there not be a crime, that would be my greatest wish. I can't do that. I do apologize to my family and friends, the Rockford community and everyone else that's been hurt by this event."

When the parole board asked Nelson to detail his crimes, he said he only remembered "bits and pieces of sheer horror." He claimed his last memory beforehand was Ann's phone call. "I felt like it was my dad all over again," he said. He claimed he experienced auditory and visual hallucinations and felt his dead father's presence during the crime. "All I remember is being split somehow and my father being present - and again, this is irrational - and me telling him not to go up the stairs," he said. "This was after I had imagined that I killed myself."

At a parole hearing in 2008, Nelson said he didn't know if he deserved parole, but his job as a prison library clerk, which he had held since the 1980s, was proof he could be a productive member of society. "I think that demonstrates that if I can make a commitment to something, I carry it through," he said. "If you did choose to parole me, you wouldn't have to worry about my life out there, because I would be following Christ. He lives inside me." Although one member of board, Craig Findley, credited him for being a model inmate and making a case for his spiritual conversion being genuine, he said he would never vote in favor of his release. "Almost alone among inmates in custody, he deserves to die in prison," Findley said. "There are not many I would say that about. But this is a crime that can't be forgiven. He can never be released."

At a parole hearing in 2014, Nelson repeated his claims that he didn't remember the crime very well and was a sincere Christian.

== Death ==
Nelson was an inmate at Graham Correctional Center in Hillsboro, Illinois. He died in custody on June 18, 2017, aged 85, at St. John's Hospital in Springfield. He had been awaiting another parole hearing at the time of his death. Over his nearly 40 years in prison, he, whose projected discharge date was in October 2076, never won a single vote in favor of his release.

== See also ==
- List of homicides in Illinois
