= Kerrville State Hospital =

Mental health facility in Texas

Coordinates: 30.0473°N 99.1561°W

Kerrville State Hospital (KSH) is a mental hospital in Kerrville, Texas, operated by health and human services.

The patients of this 202-patient facility, who were judged in state courts as "not guilty by reason of insanity" and/or "incompetent to stand trial," come from throughout the state. The majority were originally patients of North Texas State Hospital Vernon Campus but were moved here because the state determined they needed a longer stay in mental healthcare, while also not being obviously harmful to others.

Kerrville State Hospital is fenced, and it does not have guards carrying weapons.

== History ==
The property, purchased by the State of Texas in 1935, previously served as other healthcare facilities before 1951. The dude ranch My Ranch operated here at the beginning of the 20th century; it began its life as a healthcare area in 1915. From 1915 to 1917 the tuberculosis hospital Mountain Park Sanitorium occupied the site, and from 1917 to 1935 Thompson Sanitorium, run by Dr. Sam E. Thompson, occupied the site. From 1935 until a few years later, it served as a state treatment center for black people with tuberculosis.

In 1951 it opened as a Kerrville branch of a state mental hospital located in San Antonio. In 1952 it became the Kerrville State Hospital, its own institution. Originally it only served residents of specific counties in the Texas Hill Country. The largest treatment building opened in 1992; it houses ten treatment programs.
