= Darlie Routier =

American murderer on death row (born 1970)

- Routier in 1996
- Born: Darlie Lynn Peck; January 4, 1970 (age 56); Altoona, Pennsylvania, U.S.
- Spouse: Darin Routier (m. 1988; div. 2011)
- Children: 3 (including Devon and Damon)
- Status: On death row
- Conviction: Capital murder (with regard to Damon)
- Criminal charges: Capital murder (with regard to Devon; has not faced trial)
- Penalty: Death

Details
- Date: June 6, 1996
- Imprisoned at: Patrick O'Daniel Unit in Gatesville, Texas

Darlie Lynn Peck Routier (born January 4, 1970) is an American convicted murderer from Rowlett, Texas, sentenced to death for the murders of her two sons in 1996. She was only convicted in the murder of Damon and not Devon, since in case the prosecutors couldn’t land a capital murder conviction for Damon’s murder, they could attempt to get a conviction for Devon’s murder.

Damon and Devon were stabbed to death with a large kitchen knife in the Routiers' home, while Routier sustained knife wounds to her throat and arm. Routier told authorities that the crime was perpetrated by an unidentified intruder. During the trial, the prosecution argued that Routier's injuries were self-inflicted, that the crime scene had been staged, and that she murdered her sons because of the family's financial difficulties; the defense argued that there was no reason Routier would have killed her children and that the case did not have a motive, a confession, or any witnesses. In February 1997, the jury found Routier guilty of the murder of Damon and sentenced her to death by lethal injection.

Two appeals filed by Routier, based on allegations of irregularities during the trial, were denied. Since at least 2018, DNA tests have been ordered multiple times after technology has advanced. As of 2026, the results of these tests are still pending. Routier's case has been the subject of multiple books and television shows. Routier's ex-husband believes that she is innocent.

== Murder of Devon and Damon Routier ==
External videos
- Routier's 9-1-1 call

On June 6, 1996, at 2:31 a.m., 9-1-1 dispatchers in Rowlett, Texas, received a call from the Routier residence at 5801 Eagle Drive. Routier told the operator that her home had been broken into and that an intruder had stabbed her children, six-year-old Devon and five-year-old Damon, and cut her throat. Police arrived within three minutes of the 9-1-1 call. They discovered a window screen in the garage had been cut, which indicated a possible entry point for an intruder. A search of the house and grounds did not locate an intruder. Having thus secured the site, police permitted paramedics to attend to the victims.

Routier told the police that she had fallen asleep on the couch while watching television with her two sons, waking up later and discovering an unknown man in her house. She stated that as she approached him, the man fled, dropping the knife in a utility room as he ran. After picking up the knife and chasing him away, Routier said she realized that she and her children had been wounded and called 9-1-1. Police found it highly suspicious that Routier claimed she had only awoken after the attack that severely wounded her and her sons.

Routier told police that the assailant escaped through the garage. Investigators said that the garage contained no blood drops and added that indications were that no one had run through there at all. The window sills in the garage had untouched layers of dust, including the window that had been cut, implying that no one had actually climbed through it, and the mulch in the flower beds between the garage and the backyard gate was undisturbed. However, a fingerprint was found on the windowsill which was determined in 2002 not to belong to anyone in the family. Fingerprint expert Pat Wertheim would later testify before an appeals court that he could not rule out Darlie Routier's right ring finger as the source of the print. A bloody sock was discovered 75 yards (69 m) away from the house. Lab tests revealed it had blood from both of Routier's sons on it. It also matched other socks from the Routier house which belonged to her husband Darin.

Both Damon and Devon sustained fatal injuries. Her wounds, described as superficial, came within two millimeters of her carotid artery. Routier was treated at a hospital and released two days later. Her youngest son, seven-month-old Drake, was asleep upstairs with her husband Darin at the time of the murders; both escaped harm. Newscasts showed Routier and other family members holding a birthday party at the boys' grave to posthumously celebrate Devon's seventh birthday eight days after the murders. She was shown smiling and laughing as she sprayed Silly String on the graves in celebration, singing "Happy Birthday". Family members point out that the newscasts did not show an earlier video that depicted a solemn ceremony honoring the children. Four days later, on June 18, Routier was arrested and charged with capital murder. Routier later commented on the video, saying, "He wanted to be seven. I did the only thing I knew to do to honor him and give him all his wishes because he wasn't here anymore. But how do you know what you're going to do when you lose two children? How do you know how you're going to act?"

== Trial ==
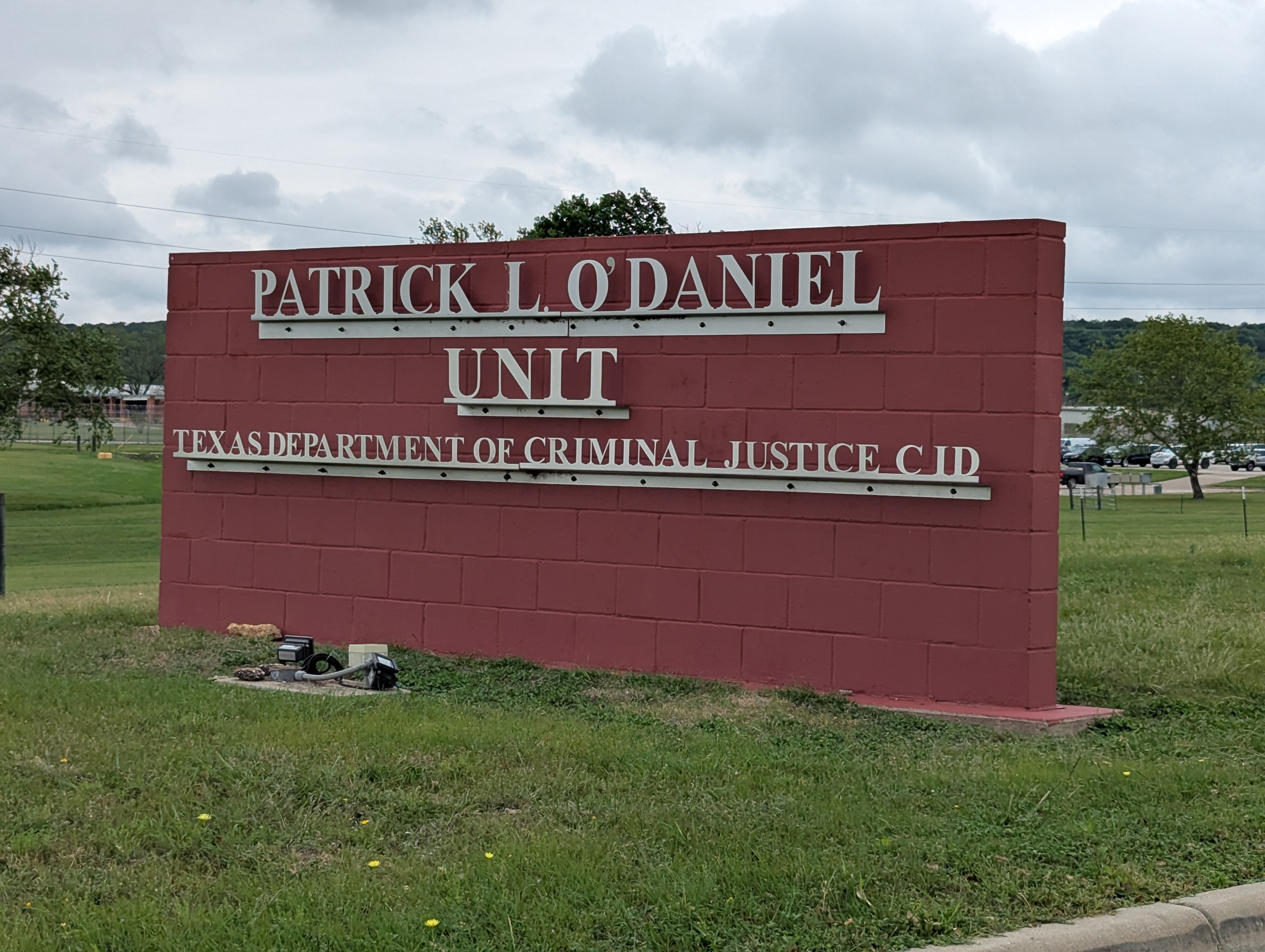
Patrick O'Daniel Unit, where Routier is located

Routier's trial began on January 6, 1997, in Kerrville, Texas. The prosecution suggested that Routier murdered her sons because of the family's financial difficulties and described Routier as "...a self-centered woman, a materialistic woman, and a woman cold enough, in fact, to murder her own two children". Jurors also saw the Silly String video. Crime scene consultant James Cron testified that evidence suggested the scene inside the Routier residence had been staged.

The prosecution also suggested there was a financial motive for the murders since both boys had a life insurance policy on them. The defense contended that this amounted to only $10,000, not enough to cover their funeral expenses. Furthermore, they asked why, if she was willing to murder for money, she did not kill her husband instead as he had an $800,000 life insurance policy. The defense also questioned why, if she killed her sons to preserve her lavish lifestyle, she left her youngest son, seven-month-old Drake, alive and unharmed. Also during the prosecution, they laid out alleged abuse allegations with one such incident at Devon’s 5th birthday party, where she shoved a piece of cake into Devon’s mouth since he wouldn’t stop spraying her with his water gun.

Routier was represented at trial by lawyer Douglas Mulder. Defense attorneys said that there was no reason why she would have killed her children and that the case did not have a motive, a confession, or any witnesses. They asserted that it was unrealistic to accuse Routier of staging a crime scene. Her attorneys advised her not to appear on the witness stand, but she testified anyway and "withered under cross-examination by prosecutor Toby Shook".

San Antonio chief medical examiner Vincent DiMaio testified that the wound to Routier's neck came within two millimeters of her carotid artery and that it was not consistent with the self-inflicted wounds he had seen in the past. That differed from the assertions of her treating physicians, who had told police officials that the wounds might have been self-inflicted. Tom Bevel testified that cast-off blood found on the back of Routier's nightshirt indicated that she had raised the knife over her head as she withdrew it from each boy to stab again.

One crucial aspect of the defense case was the bloody sock found outside the house. While the police contended that this was merely a ruse designed to falsely implicate an intruder had fled the scene, the defense contended that it proved Routier could not have committed the crime. Damon was alive when the paramedics arrived on the scene and the medical examiner testified that the boy could only have survived approximately eight minutes after receiving his injuries. Routier was on the phone with 9-1-1 for almost six minutes. The defense argued that this did not leave enough time for Routier to cut herself, stage the crime scene, plant the sock outside the house, and then return before the paramedics arrived. They also stated that, despite her injuries, Routier's blood was not found in the garage or anywhere outside the home. The prosecution countered that Routier could have planted the sock before self-inflicting her own injuries, and the medical examiner's stated survival time for Damon after he was stabbed was only an estimation. On February 1, Routier was convicted of murdering Damon. On February 4, she was sentenced to death by lethal injection. Women sentenced to death under Texas law are housed in the Patrick O'Daniel Unit (formerly Mountain View Unit) in Gatesville, Texas.

== Post-trial claims and appeals ==
Defense attorneys allege numerous errors were made during Routier's trial and in the official transcript of it, as well as the investigation of the murders, especially at the crime scene. An appeals court dismissed these claims, as did a court ruling on her habeas corpus petition. In June 2008, Routier was granted the right to new DNA tests. Her appeals were remanded to the state level for improved DNA testing. On January 29, 2014, then-Chief Judge of the United States District Court for the Western District of Texas Samuel Frederick Biery Jr. granted a request from prosecution and defense for her case for further DNA tests vital to the defense to be performed on a bloody fingerprint found in the house, a bloody sock and her nightshirt. In 2018, the Criminal District Court No. 3 ordered a third round of DNA testing with the backing of both prosecution and defense.

== Divorce ==
In June 2011, Darin Routier filed for divorce from his wife, saying that the decision was mutual and "very difficult" and that he still believes his wife is innocent. He said that they decided to divorce to end the "limbo" that they had been in since her arrest and conviction.

== In media ==
=== Books ===
The 1999 book Precious Angels: A True Story of Two Slain Children and a Mother Convicted of Murder by Barbara Davis accounted for Routier's guilt. The author has since changed her mind and now supports Routier by donating all the income from the book to her family.

In the 2015 book Dateline Purgatory: Examining the Case that Sentenced Darlie Routier to Death journalist Kathy Cruz engages legal experts for their assessments on Routier's trial transgressions and highlighting the controversies of the death penalty conviction. Throughout the book Cruz collaborates with a former FBI special agent on her examination of the case.

=== Television ===
An October 1999 episode of the TLC documentary series Forensic Files titled "Invisible Intruder" (S4; E1), reports on how detectives discovered who the killer was by analyzing the crime scene's blood spatter, Darlie's 911 call and the offender profiling of her behavior.

External videos
- 48 Hours: Precious Angels, full episode – CBS News video

An episode of the CBS News series 48 Hours titled Precious Angels is derived from the true-crime book of the same title, authored by Barbara Davis, which first aired August 10, 2001. CBS correspondent Bill Lagattuta interviewed Darin Routier, the incarcerated Darlie Routier and Davis about the slayings; associated public officials and defense attorneys were also interviewed.

Investigation Discovery series Deadly Women covered the case in Season 5, Episode 4, called "Kill Their Own", on August 19, 2011.

The Investigation Discovery network aired an episode of Werner Herzog's series On Death Row titled "Darlie Routier" that covered the case in Season 2, Episode 2, broadcast on September 10, 2013.

The case features in the documentary Death Row Stories, Season 2 Episode 1 “Mother V. Texas", available on Amazon on August 9, 2015. The documentary series are executive produced by Alex Gibney and Robert Redford, and narrated by Susan Sarandon.

The American Broadcasting Company (ABC) seven-episode documentary series The Last Defense examines the death row cases of Darlie Routier and Julius Jones. The series premiered on June 12, 2018, profiling Routier's case in a four-part episode:

- "Series Premiere – Darlie Routier: The Crime", S1; E1
- "Darlie Routier: The Trial", S1; E2
- "Darlie Routier: The Woman", S1; E3
- "Darlie Routier: The Fight", S1; E4

Jones's sentence has since been commuted to life without parole, while Routier remains on death row.

In 2019, ABC also aired a two-part documentary about Routier's case as part of its 20/20 newsmagazine.

In 2020, ITV broadcast the documentary Death Row's Women with Susanna Reid in which the British journalist Susanna Reid traveled to Texas to interview Routier face to face over the course of an hour.

Unsolved Mysteries aired a "Final Appeal" episode, with Robert Stack and re-aired under Dennis Farina.

== See also ==
- Susan Smith
- Dora Luz Buenrostro
- List of women on death row in the United States
- List of women executed in the United States since 1976
