= John Battaglia =

American murderer (1955–2018)

- Battaglia from the Texas Department of Criminal Justice Death Row Information page
- Born: John David Battaglia Jr. August 2, 1955; Enterprise, Alabama, U.S.
- Died: February 1, 2018 (aged 62); Huntsville Unit, Texas, U.S.
- Spouses: Michelle Ghetti; Mary Jean Pearle (m. 1991, div. 2000)
- Children: 3
- Status: Executed by lethal injection
- Motive: Revenge against his estranged wife
- Convictions: Capital murder (Note: "PENAL CODE TITLE 5. OFFENSES AGAINST THE PERSON CHAPTER 19. CRIMINAL HOMICIDE." Note that the death penalty procedure is from "CODE OF CRIMINAL PROCEDURE TITLE 1. CODE OF CRIMINAL PROCEDURE CHAPTER 37. THE VERDICT."); Assault
- Penalty: Death

Details
- Victims: 2
- Date: May 2, 2001
- Country: United States
- State: Texas
- Locations: Deep Ellum, Dallas, Texas, U.S.
- Weapon: Gun

John David Battaglia Jr. (August 2, 1955 – February 1, 2018) was an American convicted murderer who was executed by the state of Texas for killing his two young daughters in May 2001 in an act of "ultimate revenge" against his estranged ex-wife, Mary Jeane Pearle, who had separated from him after his numerous instances of assault and violence. Battaglia was executed for the murders on February 1, 2018.

== Background ==
Battaglia was of Italian ancestry and was born on a military base in Enterprise, Alabama. As a child, he moved across the country and to Germany. His father left the military in 1970. He attended high school in Oregon and later moved to Dumont, New Jersey, ultimately graduating from Dumont High School. He attended Fairleigh Dickinson University, being an accounting major after initially being a pre-med major, but dropped out in 1976 at the urging of a friend. After getting into trouble with the law for using illegal drugs, he joined the Marines. He became a sergeant and left the Marines to become an accountant. He moved to Dallas because his father lived there, and he took night classes to become a Certified Public Accountant (CPA) and did modeling. He ultimately became an accountant.

Battaglia had a daughter, Christie, from a previous marriage to Michelle Ghetti (née LaBorde) in Dallas. At one point Ghetti, an attorney, filed a request for Battaglia to be arrested on grounds of harassment. He had committed domestic violence against Ghetti: on one occasion he assaulted her outside of the school Christie attended; on another, he caused her a broken nose, and, in another, he assaulted her at a bus stop in retaliation for the arrest request, causing her to be admitted to a hospital. In 1987 Battaglia admitted guilt to a misdemeanor charge and was punished with probation for a two-year period.

The woman who would become his second wife, Mary Jean Pearle, resided in Highland Park, Texas, in the Dallas-Fort Worth metroplex. They married on April 6, 1991. His two daughters with Pearle, Mary Faith and Liberty Mae Battaglia, were students at John S. Bradfield Elementary School in Highland Park.

In January 1999, Pearle separated from Battaglia after verbal abuse, and he was not permitted to live with her. At Christmas 1999, Battaglia was on a visit to see Faith and Liberty when he attacked Pearle in a domestic violence incident. As a result, he pleaded guilty to a misdemeanor-level assault charge and was given two years' probation. Pearle filed for divorce immediately after the incident, and the divorce was finalized in August 2000.

Pearle was attempting to have Battaglia's parole revoked because he had harassed her over the telephone. He was not supposed to send messages to her, and she contended that he should be incarcerated because of his history of domestic violence. He also used marijuana, which violated the terms of his probation.

Up to that point, Battaglia had not hit either of his daughters. Pearle stated that he previously doted upon them and, until he killed the girls, she did not believe he was willing to harm them despite his earlier domestic violence towards adult women. He was allowed to have periodic visits with them. To his acquaintances, he made negative statements about his ex-wives while making positive statements about his daughters. Jacquielynn Floyd, a columnist for The Dallas Morning News, stated that "He fooled people into believing he was a devoted father."

== Murders ==
On May 2, 2001, Pearle left her daughters with Battaglia for a planned dinner at the mall, but instead he took them into his apartment in the Adam Hats Lofts in Deep Ellum in Dallas. Battaglia called Pearle from the apartment. With Pearle on the phone he shot and killed their daughters, ages six and nine. During the phone call, he asked Faith to ask Pearle, "Why do you want Daddy to go to jail?" Before her death, she cried, "No, Daddy!" "Please don't!" "Don't do it!" Pearle then told the girls to run but it was too late. Battaglia grabbed his gun and shot Faith three times and shot Liberty five times with his gun. He told Pearle, "Merry fucking Christmas", in reference to the Christmas 1999 assault. Pearle terminated the call and dialed 9-1-1. After the killings, Battaglia left a message on the answering machine in the girls' bedroom:

"Good night my little babies. I hope you're resting in a different place. I love you. I wish that you had nothing to do with your mother. She was evil, vicious, stupid. You will be free of her. I love you very dearly. You were very brave girls. Very brave. Liberty, you were oh so brave. I love you so much. Bye."

Battaglia then visited a tattoo parlor and got two roses, representing his daughters, on his left biceps. He was apprehended shortly afterward and got into a fistfight with the arresting police officers which left him with a black eye. Police confiscated sixteen firearms from the house. Texas authorities stated that Battaglia killed his daughters out of retaliation because Pearle had complained to his probation officer.

The funeral for the two girls was held at Our Redeemer Lutheran Church in North Dallas, and they were buried at Hillcrest Cemetery, in North Dallas, with Pearle's father.

== Legal proceedings and execution ==
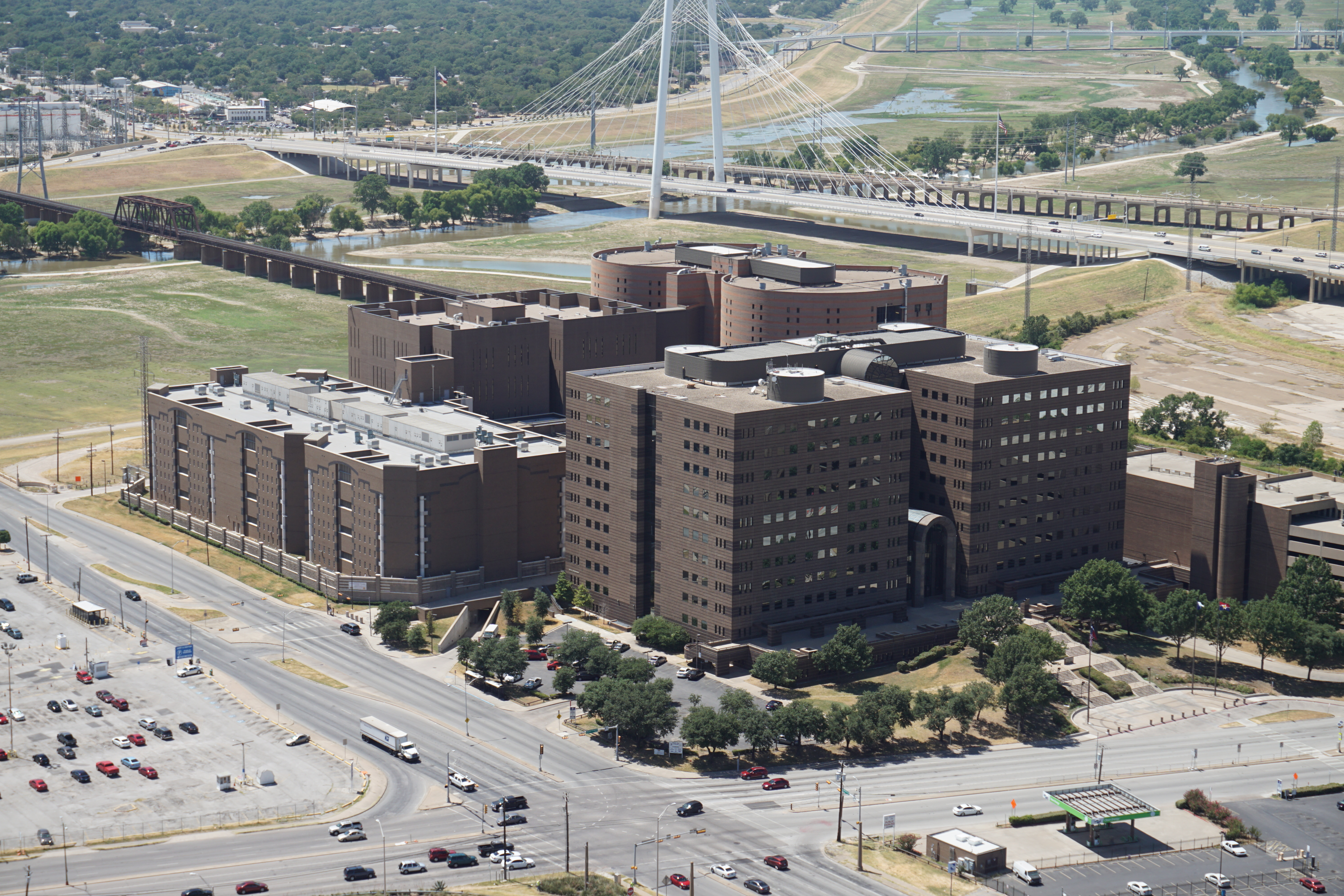
Frank Crowley Courts Building, the site of Battaglia's trial

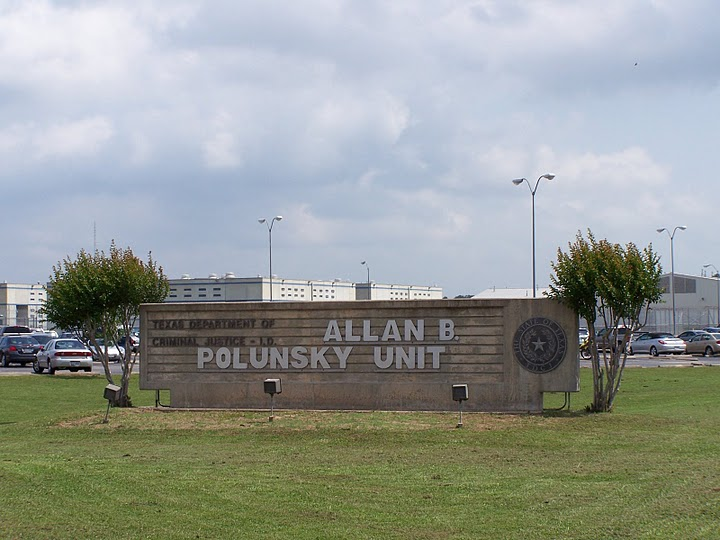
Polunsky Unit, which houses Texas men's death row

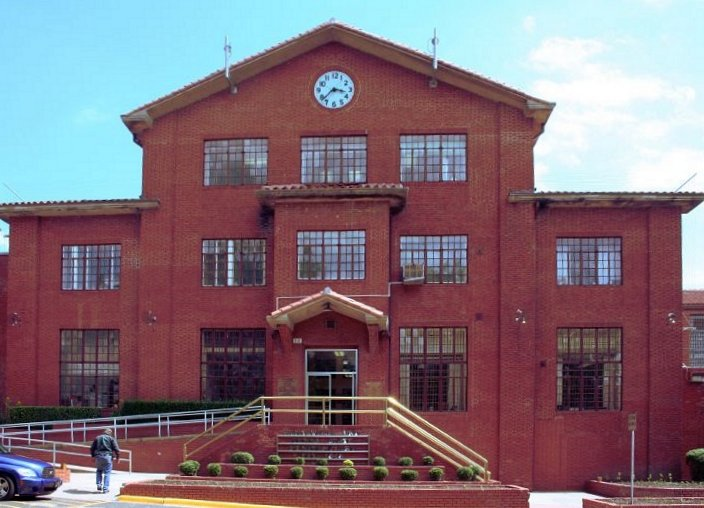
Huntsville Unit, where the Texas execution chamber is located

Battaglia's capital murder trial began on April 22, 2002, and was held at the Frank Crowley Courts Building in Dallas. Howard Blackmon was the lead prosecutor; Battaglia was represented by Paul Johnson and Paul Brauchle. Jurors deliberated for 19 minutes before convicting Battaglia of the highest charge, capital murder. During the penalty phase of the trial, Battaglia's lawyers argued that their client should not receive the death penalty because he had bipolar disorder. On April 30, 2002, the same jury sentenced Battaglia to death.

After he received his sentence, Battaglia was held at the Polunsky Unit near Livingston. After the sentencing, his ex-wife told him to "burn in hell forever". She also said: "You are one of the most heinous murderers of modern times. I would like to say the next time you see me is when they put the needle in your arm....But I'm not going to waste the time to be there." Pearle changed her mind and witnessed the execution nearly sixteen years later. Christie Battaglia publicly expressed support for Battaglia's execution, as did Ghetti.

Death sentences are automatically appealed, and Battaglia's appellate attorneys fought to have his sentence commuted from death to life-without-parole. Battaglia was scheduled to be executed on March 30, 2016, but the Fifth U.S. Circuit Court of Appeals issued a stay so that the court could rule on his attorneys' claims that he was not mentally competent to be executed. The State of Texas did not challenge this stay, and his execution was postponed. On August 15, 2016, Battaglia was given an execution date of December 7, 2016. On December 2, 2016, the Texas Court of Criminal Appeals issued a stay of execution for Battaglia due to questions concerning his mental competency. The ruling gave his attorneys 60 days to argue before the Court of Criminal Appeals.

On September 20, 2017, the Texas Court of Criminal Appeals dismissed Battaglia's claim of mental incompetence. At a competency hearing in November 2016, a mental health expert testified that Battaglia was likely faking symptoms of mental illness in an attempt to delay his execution. The appeals court affirmed this, stating that Battaglia was likely malingering. Before making the challenges of mental capacity, Battaglia read about relevant legal cases at Polunsky Unit's law library.

On October 31, 2017, Battaglia's death warrant was signed, and a new execution date was set for February 1, 2018. Subsequent appeals failed. Battaglia was executed by lethal injection at 9:40 p.m. CST on February 1, 2018, at the Huntsville Unit in Huntsville, nearly sixteen years after his original sentencing. No one was in the convict's side of the witness room. Mary Jean Pearle was in the victims' side of the death chamber viewing area to watch him die; upon seeing his ex-wife in the witness room, Battaglia said "Well, hi Mary Jean", then, turning to the warden, stated "I'll see y'all later. Bye. Go ahead, please." As she walked away from the glass window that separated her from Battaglia, Pearle said, "I've seen enough of him."

== Aftermath ==
During the 2000s, this was one of a spate of domestic homicides related to the Park Cities, Highland Park and University Park, two wealthy enclaves in the metroplex. Stephen Michaud of the Dallas Observer wrote: "never in memory have the Park Cities been jolted by such unspeakable, and apparently similar, family homicides as the three most recent killings, all of which occurred in a 25-month cluster."

No, Daddy, Don't!: A Father's Murderous Act of Revenge, a 2003 nonfiction book by Irene Pence, is about the murders.

As a result of the crime, Toby Goodman sponsored a bill in the Texas State Legislature that would ask judges to consider history of domestic violence when considering whether or not parental visits with children would be supervised. The Texas Senate unanimously passed Bill 140, which was signed into law by Texas Governor Rick Perry, taking effect on September 1, 2001.

Hannah's House, a supervised visitation facility was founded as a direct result of this case and SB 140. A chance meeting at the courthouse during the sentencing phase between Mary Jean Pearle and the founder/executive director Wayne Whitworth ultimately resulted in her joining the board of directors for a short while. Later, Faith And Liberty's Place, a center for supervised visits of children operated by the Dallas domestic abuse shelter The Family Place, was established in memory of the victims.

Dallas County Family Court Judge David Finn had dismissed Battaglia's assault charge in a previous hearing. The year after the killings, he resigned his position as a judge and ran against incumbent Bill Hill for election as Dallas County district attorney. Pearle campaigned against Finn, stating that his ruling kept Battaglia out of prison, which allowed the father to kill his daughters. Finn lost the March 12 election when he received only 25% of the vote.

== See also ==
- List of people executed in Texas, 2010–2019
- List of people executed in the United States in 2018

== Further media ==
- "Deadly Affection: John Battaglia". The Dallas Morning News. February 21, 2014.
- "One Of Dallas' Most Notorious Killers To Be Executed Tonight". KTVT (CBS DFW). February 1, 2018.
- "Texas man executed for killing his daughters". Washington Post. February 1, 2018.

Executions carried out in Texas
Preceded by William Earl Rayford January 30, 2018	John David Battaglia Jr. February 1, 2018	Succeeded by Rosendo Rodriguez III March 27, 2018
Executions carried out in the United States
Preceded by William Earl Rayford – Texas January 30, 2018	John David Battaglia Jr. – Texas; February 1, 2018	Succeeded by Eric Scott Branch – Florida February 22, 2018
