= June 1969 =

Month of 1969

<<	June 1969					>>
Su	Mo	Tu	We	Th	Fr	Sa
1	2	3	4	5	6	7
8	9	10	11	12	13	14
15	16	17	18	19	20	21
22	23	24	25	26	27	28
29	30

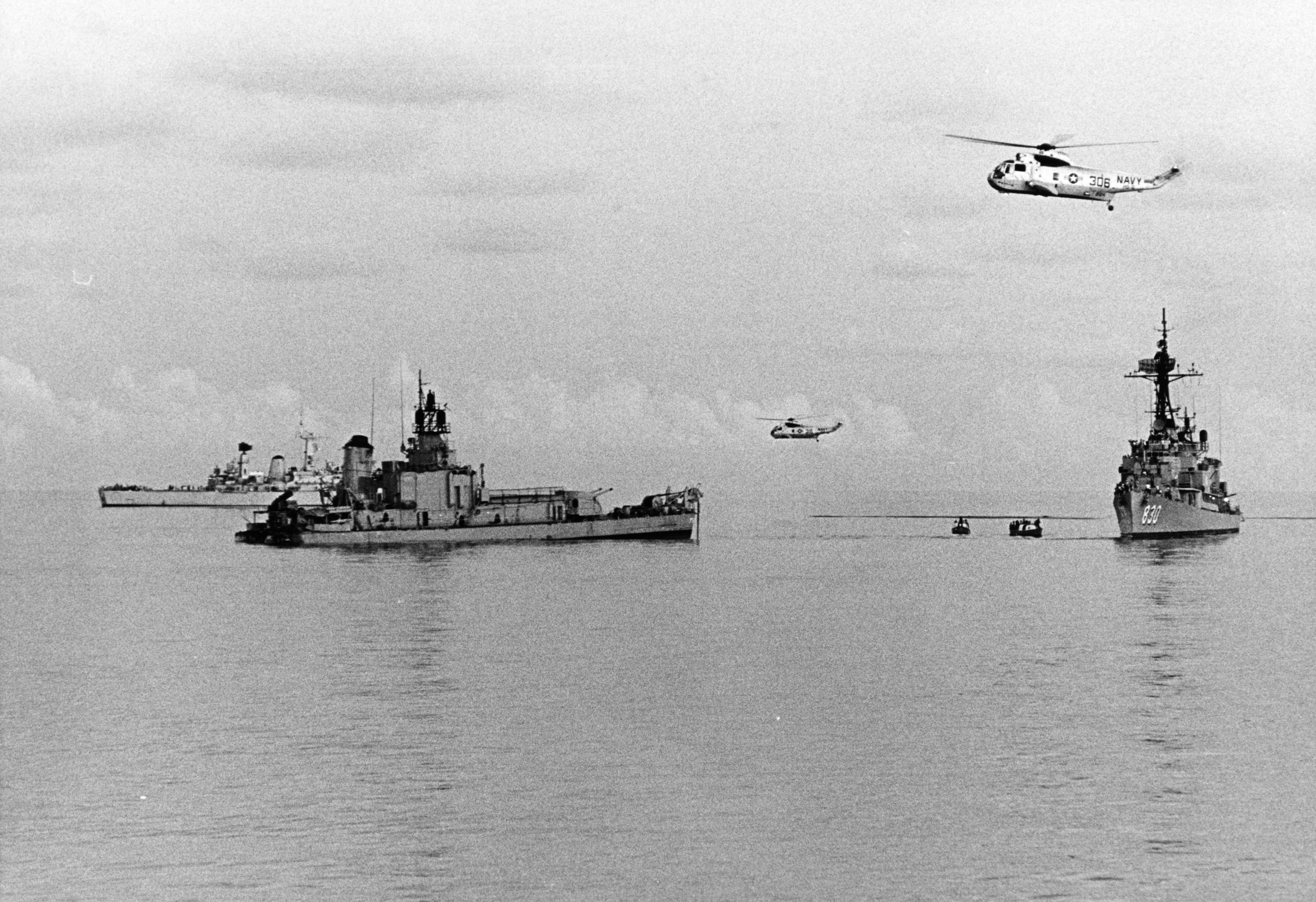
June 3, 1969: Destroyer USS Frank Evans sliced in two by Australian carrier, 74 seamen killed

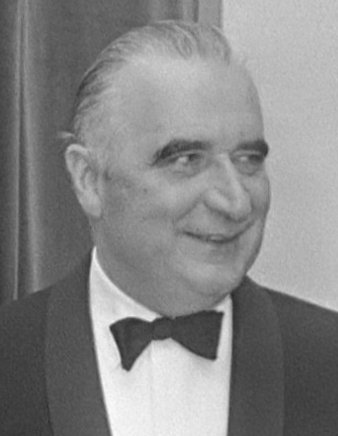
June 20, 1969: Pompidou elected new French President

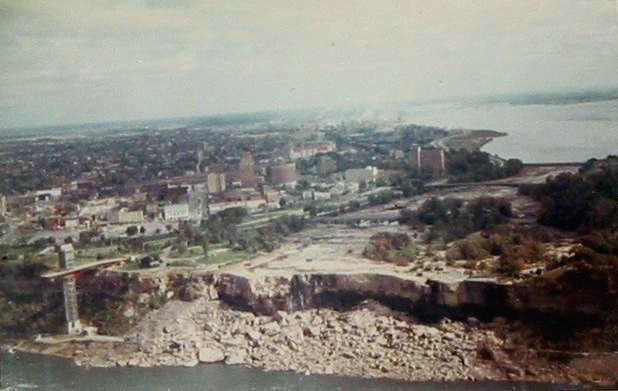
June 12, 1969: Niagara Falls "turned off" for five months on American Falls side

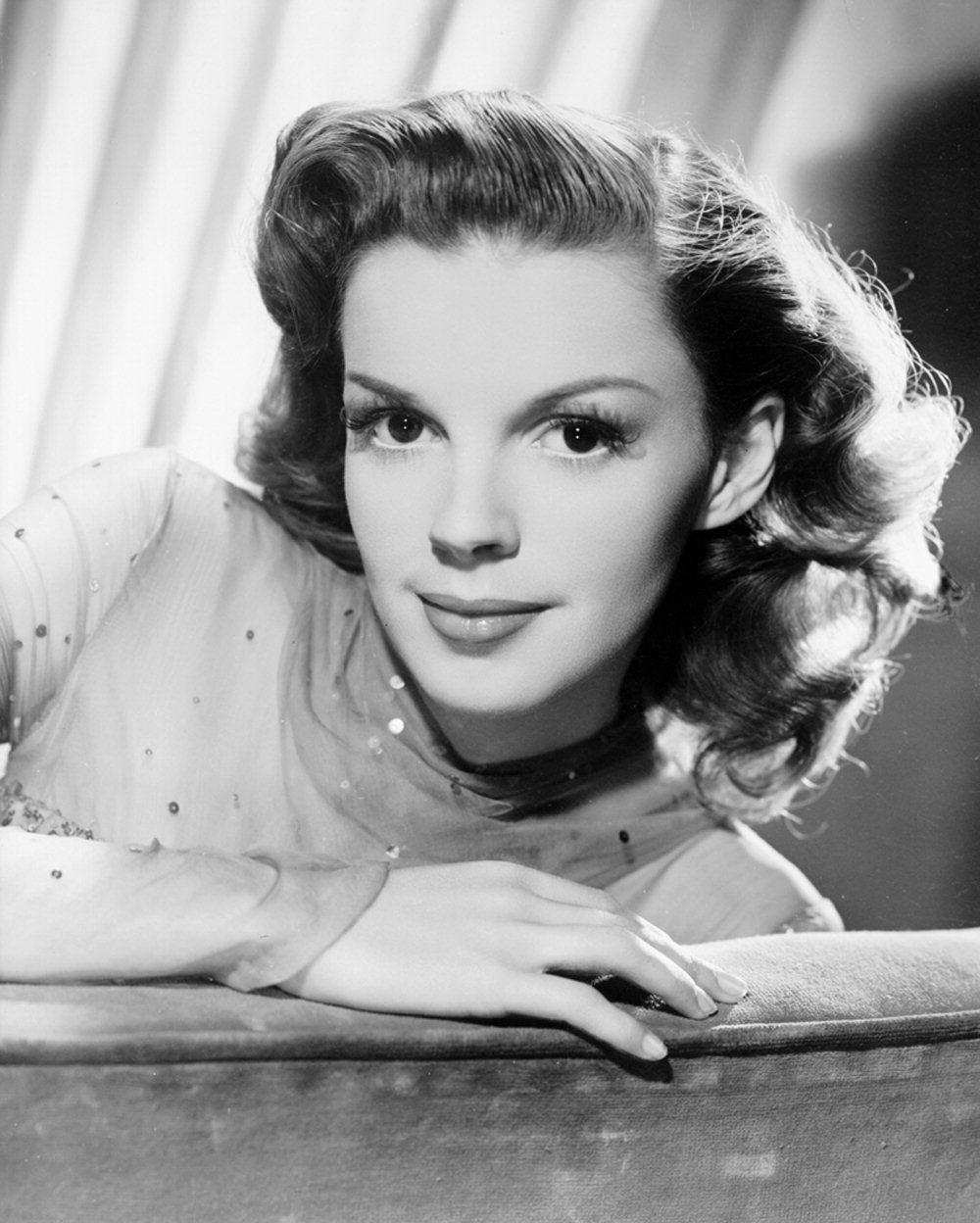
June 22, 1969: Judy Garland dies of drug overdose

The following events occurred in June 1969:

== June 1, 1969 (Sunday) ==
- Former Prime Minister Georges Pompidou and Acting President of France Alain Poher finished first and second in a field of seven candidates in the first round of the French presidential election. Pompidou received almost 45% of the ballots cast, and Poher edged Communist Party candidate Jacques Duclos split another 44% of the votes, with Poher getting 23% to Duclos's 21%. Because none of the candidates received a majority of the votes, a runoff election between Pompidou and Poher was set for two weeks later.
- Died:
  - Attilio Degrassi, 81, Italian archaeologist and specialist in epigraphy, the collection and analysis of information from inscriptions on ancient works.
  - Ivar Ballangrud, 65, Norwegian speed skater who won three gold medals at the 1936 Winter Olympics

== June 2, 1969 (Monday) ==
- The United States Supreme Court voted 6 to 2 in the case of Boykin v. Alabama to set aside a death sentence meted out to an African-American who had pleaded guilty to the armed robbery of five stores in Mobile, Alabama, holding that it was clear from the transcript of the case that Edward Boykin's plea had been made without any indication that he had been made aware of its consequences. Writing for the majority, Justice William O. Douglas said "A plea of guilty is more than an admission of conduct; it is a conviction... Ignorance, incomprehension, terror, inducements, subtle or blatant threats might be a perfect cover-up of unconstitutionality. What is at stake for an accused facing death or imprisonment demands utmost solicitude of which courts are capable, in canvassing the matter with the accused, to make sure he has a full understanding of what the plea connotes and of its consequence... So far as the record shows, the judge asked no questions of [Boykin] concerning his plea, and [Boykin] did not address the court. Boykin had been scheduled to go to the electric chair in June 1968 despite the fact that nobody had been killed in the robberies, and the only injury had been when a girl was struck in the leg by the ricochet of a bullet. The Court did not reach the question of whether a state could impose the death penalty for armed robbery without fatalities.

== June 3, 1969 (Tuesday) ==
Paths taken by HMAS Melbourne and USS Frank E. Evans in the minutes leading up to the collision

- Seventy-four U.S. Navy men were killed when their destroyer, the USS Frank E. Evans, was accidentally rammed and sliced in two by the Australian aircraft carrier HMAS Melbourne. The Frank E. Evans had a crew of 273 when the collision took place during pre-dawn maneuvers at 4:12 in the morning Philippine Time (0812 Monday UTC). The Melbourne was able to lash the stern of the American destroyer to its side to keep it upright, and the 197 people on board that section of the ship survived. All but two of the other 76 people remaining at the front of the Frank E. Evans sank with the bow in 1,400 feet (430 m) of ocean; most of them had been sleeping in their quarters beneath decks. Three of the dead were brothers, Cary Sage, Gregory Sage and Kelly Sage of Niobrara, Nebraska. The ships had been maneuvering in the South China Sea as part of maneuvers among the navies of the SEATO, the Southeast Asia Treaty Organization. A subsequent investigation by a joint Australian and American board of inquiry found that on May 31, the Melbourne had come within 50 feet (15 m) of colliding with another American ship, the USS Everett F. Larson.
- The 79th and last original episode of Star Trek, "Turnabout Intruder", was telecast on NBC as the network shifted the series from its 10:00 p.m. Eastern time slot to a regular 7:30 p.m. Tuesday night location for its summer re-runs. By then, NBC had announced that it would not renew the science fiction drama for a fourth season. The episode had been scheduled for March 28 but had been preempted by a news report about the life of Dwight D. Eisenhower, who had died earlier that day. With an earlier broadcast time, the reruns drew more viewers than the original shows had received, a precursor to what would happen next. Never high in the Nielsen ratings during its years on NBC, the show would attain greater popularity in broadcast syndication, starting as early as September 15.

== June 4, 1969 (Wednesday) ==
- Armando Socarras Ramirez, a 22-year-old refugee from Cuba, arrived in Madrid on Iberia Airlines Flight 942 from Havana, after he and a companion climbed into the wheel compartments of the Douglas DC-8 as it was taxiing for takeoff. Ground crew workers in Madrid were surprised when Socarras, nearly frozen from a seven-and-a-half hour ride in the unpressurized wheel compartment, fell out of the right wheel well after the airliner came to a stop. Socarras had endured an air temperature as low as 40 °F (4 °C) and with little oxygen when the DC-8 was cruising at an altitude of 29,000 feet (8,800 m) over the Atlantic Ocean, and reports at the time concluded that he "is believed to be the first person in medical history, apart from heart transplant patients, who has been frozen alive and recovered." Socarras told investigators that the other stowaway, 16-year-old Jorge Perez Blanco, had climbed into the left side wheel well and was believed to have fallen to his death after the airline pilot noticed that the landing gear had not fully retracted and had lowered it a second time. Two weeks later, however, several new arrivals from Cuba reported that Perez Blanco had apparently tumbled onto the runway while the plane was taxiing for a takeoff, and that he had been taken to jail.
- All 79 persons on board Mexicana Flight 704 were killed when the Boeing 727 crashed while making its approach to Monterrey on a flight from Mexico City. Approaching the airport in a torrential rain and with low visibility, the Mexican airplane turned left rather than right when ordered to enter a holding pattern, and struck a vertical face of the Fraile del Cerro, a 6,000-foot (1,800 m) peak in the Sierra Madre Oriental.
- Died:
  - Rafael Osuna, 30, Mexican professional tennis player and winner of the 1963 U.S. Open and three Grand Slam doubles titles, was killed in the crash of Mexicana Flight 704.
  - Carlos A. Madrazo, 53, Mexican politician and former Chairman of Mexico's ruling political party, the PRI, was killed in the crash of Mexicana Flight 704.

== June 5, 1969 (Thursday) ==
- In the first authenticated case of falling space debris causing damage on Earth, the Japanese freighter ship Dai Chi Chinei was heavily damaged by wreckage from a Soviet spacecraft that had re-entered Earth's atmosphere. Five of the crewmen on the Dai Chi Chinei were seriously injured by a chunk of debris while the freighter was traversing the Strait of Tartary between the island of Sakhalin and mainland Siberia, and the accident was then investigated and confirmed by the United Nations. According to the Japanese crew, two Soviet Navy ships arrived at the site shortly after the freighter had been struck.
- "Rivet Amber", a U.S. Air Force RC-135E reconnaissance spy plane similar to one shot by North Korea a month earlier, disappeared along with all 19 of its crew while flying an exercise over the Aleutian Islands in Alaska. Although the plane was not shot down, it sent a distress call to Elmendorf Air Force Base as it traveled between the island of Shemya and Eielson Air Force Base, and was believed to have been monitoring Soviet radar and radio communications from a distance. No trace of the aircraft nor its crew has ever been found.
- Moscow hosted the International Meeting of Communist and Workers Parties, a gathering of the leaders and representatives of the communist parties of the world's nations.
- The Tupolev Tu-144 supersonic jet became the first civilian airliner to be test flown faster than the speed of sound.
- Born: Jack Smith, American attorney, Special Counsel for the U.S. Department of Justice; in Syracuse, New York
- Died: British Army General Miles Dempsey, 72, known for commanding the British Second Army assault on Gold, Juno and Sword Beaches on D-Day, the Allied invasion of Normandy. General Dempsey's passing took place the day before the 25th anniversary of D-Day.

== June 6, 1969 (Friday) ==
- The United States Court of Appeals voided the "Hershey Directive" that had been sent to American draft boards by General Lewis B. Hershey, the director of the Selective Service System. In a letter sent on October 24, 1967, General Hershey had suggested that local draft boards reclassify the status of any anti-government protesters who had a deferment, with an upgrade to 1-A permitting immediate induction into the selective service. The court wrote that the Hershey letter was a "declaration of war against anti-war protesters" that had no basis in the law but that was made "full-grown from the head of General Hershey without benefit of reference of any provision" of the draft law.
- New York Jets quarterback Joe Namath called a press conference to announce, with tears in his eyes, that he was retiring from professional football, less than six months after being the Most Valuable Player of Super Bowl III, in the wake of a threatened suspension by pro football commissioner Pete Rozelle. Namath had been ordered to sell his one-half interest in a New York restaurant, Bachelors III, because some of the restaurant's regular customers were bookies who were taking gambling bets on the restaurant premises and others were members of organized crime. Namath would reverse his position a few weeks later and report to the Jets' training camp in July.

== June 7, 1969 (Saturday) ==
- The long-awaited debut of Eric Clapton and Steve Winwood performing together in the short-lived "supergroup" Blind Faith took place in front of 100,000 people in London's Hyde Park. Guitarist/vocalist Clapton and drummer Peter "Ginger" Baker came from the recently disbanded rock group Cream; Winwood had been playing keyboards and was lead singer for Traffic, the first supergroup. Bassist Ric Grech from Family completed the quartet. Blind Faith would release their only album in August, and do concerts in Europe and the United States for eleven weeks before playing their final show in Honolulu on August 24.
- The American Echo 2 communications satellite, the largest (135-foot (41 m)) artificial Earth satellite of all time, re-entered the atmosphere and burned up after having been visible by most of the world's residents since its launch on January 25, 1964. Consisting of a rigid mylar and aluminum balloon, Echo 2 was last seen at 7:36 in the morning local time (1036 UTC) from Comodoro Rivadavia in Argentina and was estimated to have burned up over Great Britain by 7:00 in the afternoon local time (1900 UTC).
- The U.S. Department of Defense expanded its AUTOVON (an acronym for AUTOomatic VOice Network) to its military posts worldwide, giving priority to all defense-related phone calls over civilian phone lines.
- Born: Kim Rhodes, American television actress; in Portland, Oregon
- Died: Dan Bullock, 15, United States Marine and the youngest American serviceman to be killed in the Vietnam War. Bullock, an African-American living in Brooklyn after moving from North Carolina, had been only 14 years old when he altered his birth certificate to show that he was 18 years old. He was killed while guarding the An Hoa Combat Base in South Vietnam.

== June 8, 1969 (Sunday) ==
- Twelve members of one family— two parents and 10 of their children ranging in age from six months old to 17 years old— were killed in an arson fire that destroyed their home in Parkersburg, West Virginia. The only survivors were two of the other children, aged 15 and 13, and their grandfather. Two days later, the surviving teenagers were arrested after police said that the 15-year-old girl had told them that they intentionally set the blaze following an argument with their parents. After the teens were indicted for murder and the case scheduled for trial, the Wood County, West Virginia, circuit court would rule "that an alleged confession [by the girl] and subsequent evidence turned up by the confession were obtained without her knowingly and intelligently waiving her rights" and were thus inadmissible. On April 17, 1970, the murder charges would be dismissed because the only evidence linking the teenagers to the crime was no longer available.
- Following a meeting at Midway Island between U.S. President Richard Nixon and South Vietnamese President Nguyễn Văn Thiệu, President Nixon announced that 25,000 American troops would be withdrawn from the Vietnam War by the end of September. The first group to be removed from South Vietnam would be 900 combat infantrymen from the 9th Infantry Division of the United States Army, who would be "airlifted to the continental United States for inactivation", according to Secretary of Defense Melvin Laird. Withdrawal would be completed between July 8 and August 28.
- Died: Robert Taylor (stage name for Spangler Brugh), 57, American film and television star, died from lung cancer.

== June 9, 1969 (Monday) ==
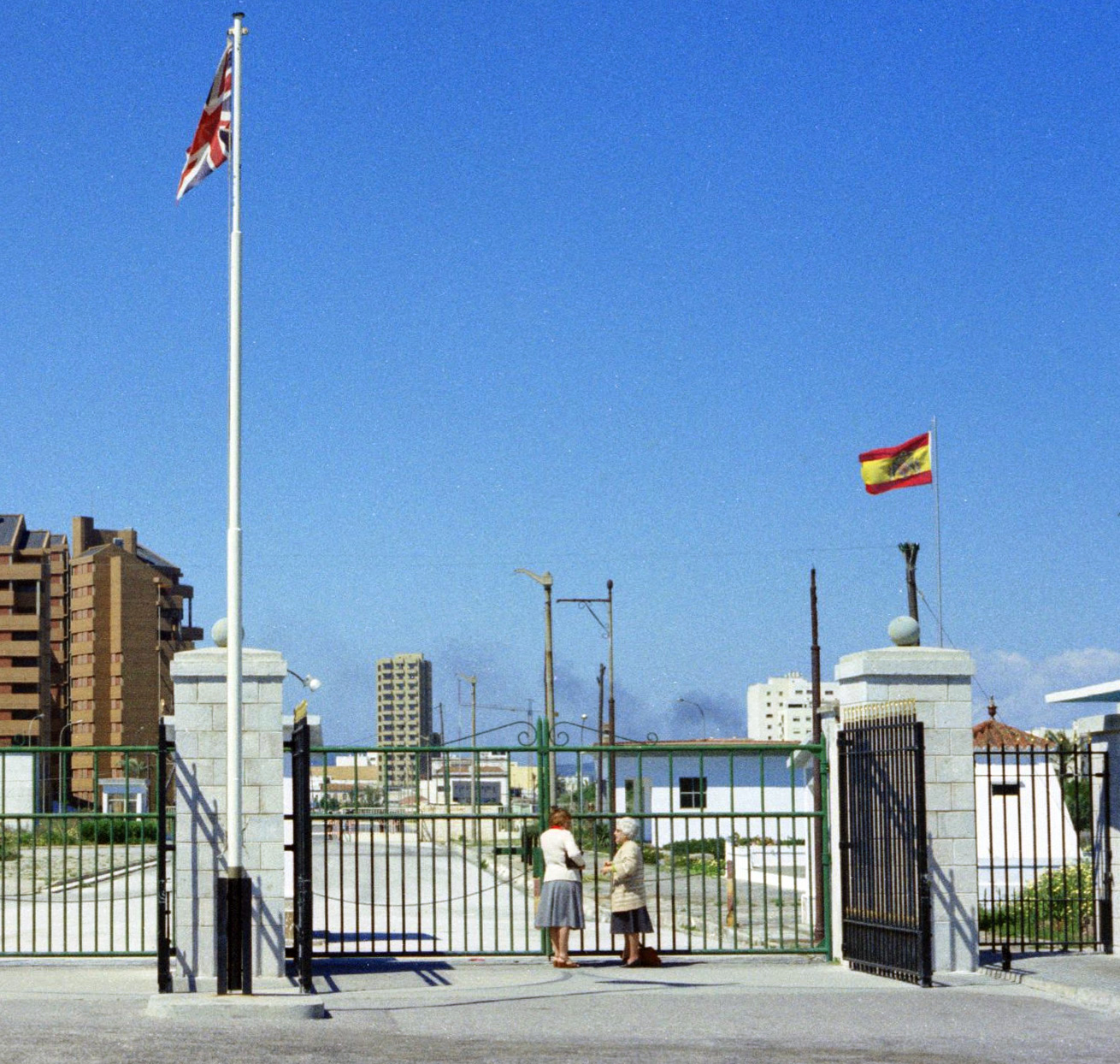
The Green Gate in 1977

- Shortly after midnight, the government of Spain closed its border with the British Overseas Territory of Gibraltar, located on the south of the Iberian peninsula. While Gibraltarians had been barred from Spain since May 1968, about 4,800 Spanish citizens had been allowed to work in Gibraltar (which had a resident population of about 24,500 at the time) and would no longer be allowed to work there. On June 28, Spain halted the ferry service that brought tourists to Gibraltar from its Mediterranean Sea port of Algeciras in the Province of Cádiz. After more than 13 years, the border closing would be partially lifted on December 15, 1982, and the "big green gate" at the Spanish town of La Línea de la Concepción would be opened for thousands of Spanish citizens and Gibraltarians were allowed to walk through. The frontier gate across the road crossing would remain closed for more than 15 years until 30 seconds past midnight, local time, on February 5, 1985.
- For the first time in American history, the Federal Reserve Board of Governors approved an increase of a full percentage point in the U.S. prime rate — the minimum interest rate for an American bank to loan money. Although previous increases had been for one-half or one-quarter of a point, the rate was increased from 7 1/2% to 8 1/2%, the highest up to that time. The rate would be lowered to 8% on March 25, 1970, and continue to drop during the Nixon administration, reaching a low of 4 1/2 on February 16, 1972, then begin rising, reaching 12% by the time of Nixon's resignation in 1974, before dropping again during the presidency of Gerald Ford; during the administration of Jimmy Carter, the rate would rise from 6 1/4% to a record high of 21 1/2% on December 19, 1980. The "prime rate" is that which is reserved for borrowers with the highest credit, with higher interest rates than prime permitted for borrowers considered to be at risk for default.
- President Nixon's nomination of Warren E. Burger for Chief Justice of the United States was confirmed by the Democrat-dominated United States Senate, 74 to 3, with only Stephen M. Young of Ohio, Gaylord Nelson of Wisconsin, and Eugene J. McCarthy (from Burger's home state of Minnesota), all Democrats, voting no.

== June 10, 1969 (Tuesday) ==
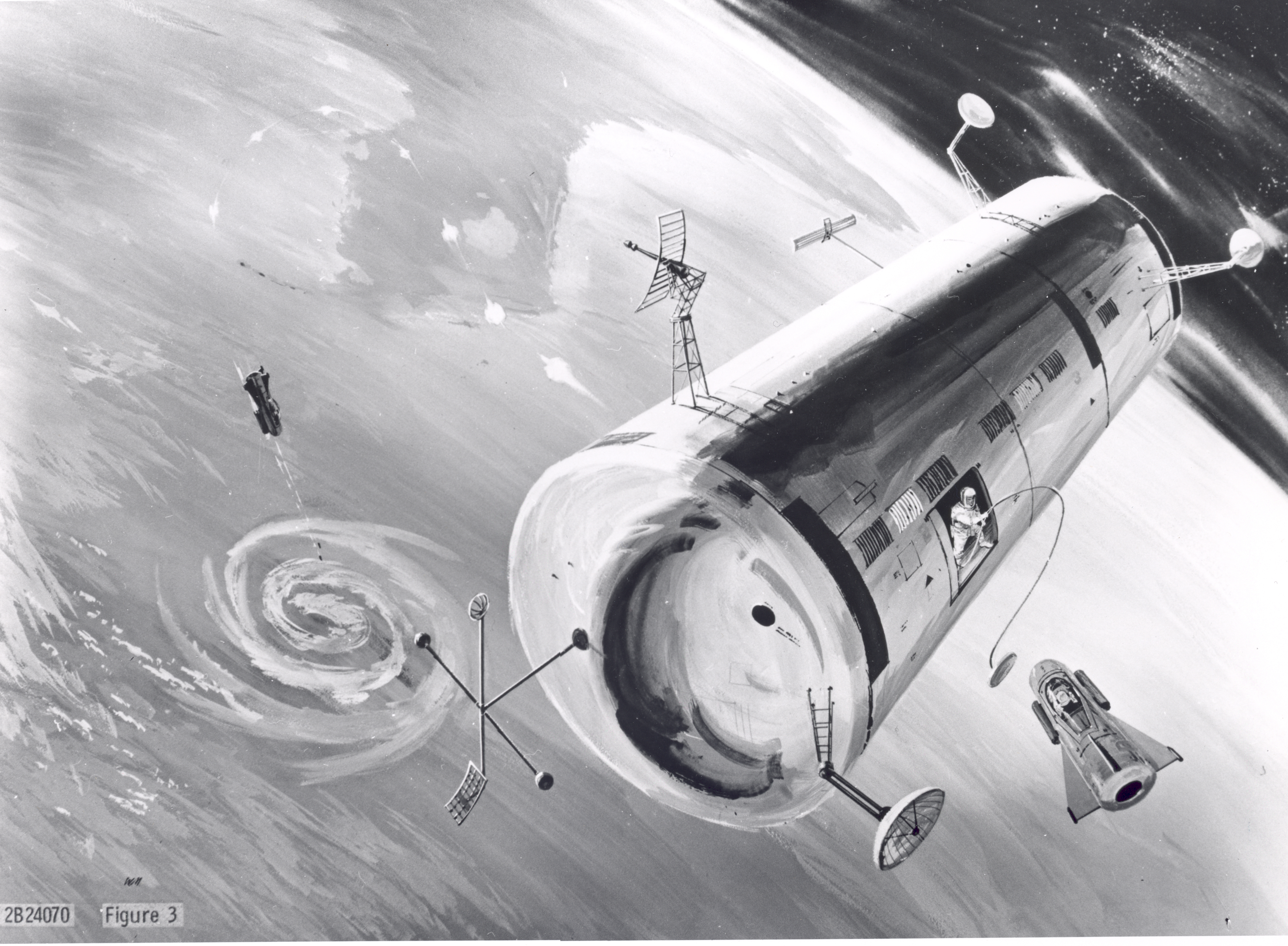
Artist's conception of the MOL

- Further work on the Manned Orbiting Laboratory (MOL), the U.S. Air Force's planned military space station, was halted on orders of American President Richard Nixon as part of a cut of the defense budget. Ever since the first announcement in 1963 of the planned MOL (which would have featured two USAF astronauts working for 30 days at a time "to inspect and destroy, if necessary, hostile satellites"), $1.3 billion had been spent on the project and another $1.5 billion was projected to be paid over until completion in 1974, which was already 2 1/2 years behind schedule and was 50% more expensive than originally projected. The end of the American program, in effect, brought an end to the need of the MOL's counterpart in the Soviet Union, the Almaz ("Diamond") space station (which would be modified for launch as the civilian Salyut 2 station). By 1969, however, the reconnaissance features of both the MOL and Almaz had been made obsolete by unmanned spy satellites.
- Pope Paul VI became the first Pontiff of the Roman Catholic Church to visit Switzerland, landing in Geneva for 12 hours to visit the headquarters of the World Council of Churches in the traditional "intellectual center of Protestant thought". The Pope was greeted by the Reverend Eugene Carson Blake, an American Presbyterian minister and General Secretary of the World Council, where the two discussed issues relating to future Christian unity. The Council itself was composed of representatives of 234 different denominations of Protestant and Orthodox organizations, and the event marked the highest-level meeting of the leaders of Catholic and non-Catholic Christians. The Pope also delivered a speech at the annual world meeting of the International Labour Organization, which was celebrating its 50th anniversary, and which had 1,700 delegates from 121 nations.
- The Viet Cong organization, officially called the National Liberation Front of South Vietnam (NLF), announced that it had selected leaders for its "Provisional Revolutionary Government of the Republic of South Vietnam" (PRG), a "government in exile" to assume leadership if the Viet Cong and North Vietnam were successful in conquering South Vietnam. Former South Vietnamese lawyer and NLF president Nguyễn Hữu Thọ was named as chairman of the advisory council to the PRG, and Huỳnh Tấn Phát was named the PRG Council President. After the fall of Saigon to Communist forces on April 30, 1975, the two men would administer South Vietnam on behalf of North Vietnam until the official reunification of the two nations as the Socialist Republic of Vietnam on July 2, 1976.
- A column of Soviet troops and tanks crossed the border from the Kazakh SSR (now the nation of Kazakhstan) into the Xinjiang autonomous region of the People's Republic of China, moving through Yumin County, where shots were exchanged between Chinese borders guards and the invaders. The Soviets denied invading China and accused the Chinese of provoking an attack by sending a group of soldiers roughly 400 metres (1,300 ft) into Soviet territory. Although the Soviets and Chinese had fought in March on a disputed island in the Ussuri River, the border crossings were the first penetrations over the land boundary between the two nuclear superpowers.

== June 11, 1969 (Wednesday) ==
- Mankind's first trip by sled across the Arctic Ocean came to a successful conclusion as a pair of helicopters picked up the four members of the British Trans-Arctic Expedition — Wally Herbert, Roy Koerner, Allan Gill, and Kenneth Hedges — from the Norwegian island of Vesle Tavleøya and transported them to the Royal Navy patrol ship HMS Endurance; Herbert would tell reporters later that "We envisaged the grand finale with the four dog teams and sledges pulling close to the ship or, even better, the party landing on West Spitsbergen island and sledging down the fjord and over the glaciers to meet the Endurance," rather than having to end the journey with a helicopter flight. The four had departed, along with their 34-dog team of huskies, from Point Barrow, Alaska, on February 21, 1968, going northward on the 156th meridian west, passing the North Pole on April 5, 1969, and then proceeding in a straight line southward along the 24th meridian east, arriving at Tavleøya on May 29, 1969, and finishing a journey of 3,620 miles (5,830 km).
- Born: Peter Dinklage, American stage, film and television actor who was born with dwarfism; known for portraying Tyrion Lannister on Game of Thrones; in Morristown, New Jersey
- Died: John L. Lewis, 89, American labor leader who built the United Mine Workers of America into one of the most powerful labor unions in America during his 40 years as UMWA President.

== June 12, 1969 (Thursday) ==
- For the first time in history, part of Niagara Falls was "turned off", as a cofferdam was put in place behind the American Falls portion of the U.S. and Canadian waterfall. Horseshoe Falls and the Bridal Veil Falls continued to flow without interruption, but the American Falls were allowed to run dry. For the next five months and 13 days, repairs were made to prevent erosion of the riverbed and tourists were allowed to walk across part of the area where the river had run its course. The dam would be removed on November 25 and all three portions of Niagara Falls have flowed continuously since then.
- NASA announced that Apollo 11 was cleared for launch on July 16 for the first manned landing on the Moon. U.S. Air Force Lieutenant General Samuel C. Phillips, the director of the Apollo program, gave the go-ahead after an 80-minute telephone conference between NASA officials at Houston, Cape Kennedy, Huntsville and Washington. The alternative would have been to postpone the launch until August. NASA released a timetable four days later, with the original date of Neil Armstrong's first steps on the Moon being set for Monday, July 21, at 2:22 in the morning Eastern Time (0722 UTC). However, NASA would accede to American public demand for the event to be seen on prime time television, and allow Armstrong to descend from the craft six and a half hours after landing rather than ten hours. Mankind's first steps on the Moon would take place at 9:56 p.m. Eastern on July 20 (0256 UTC).
- Canada's Criminal Law Amendment Act, 1968–69, decriminalizing abortion and homosexual relationships, was approved by voice vote in the Senate of Canada following its third reading, after having passed Commons on May 14. The legislation (which still required royal assent before taking effect) legalized abortion in Canada on condition that a pregnancy could be terminated if a consensus of three physicians at a licensed hospital determined that the mother's health, not otherwise defined, was in danger. The bill also allowed gay relations between two consenting adults (age 21 or older) in private dwellings.
- Died: Aleksandr Deyneka, 70, Soviet Russian painter

== June 13, 1969 (Friday) ==
- The "Amen break", a 6-second drum solo that would become "the most sampled musical track of all time", was recorded for the first time. Drummer Gregory C. Coleman of The Winstons performed the 4-bar beat 86 seconds into the song "Amen, Brother", which then became the "B-side" of the 45 rpm vinyl recording of The Winstons' hit single "Color Him Father". For 15 years, "Amen, Brother" would be forgotten until the mid-1980s, when "sampling" came into use when DJs in hip hop music dance clubs used Coleman's six-second "snare-and-cymbal sequence" to make the transition between one song and the next. By 2015, the "Amen break" would be part of more than 1,500 songs and the number would approach 3,000 within the first 50 years after it was recorded.
- Born: Søren Rasted, Danish musician and co-founder of the group Aqua; in Blovstrød
- Died: Clarence 13X, 41, American religious leader and the founder of the Five-Percent Nation, was shot to death.

== June 14, 1969 (Saturday) ==
- Dr. Joseph Weber, a physicist at the University of Maryland, announced the first detection and measurement proving the existence of gravitational waves, confirming a theory that had been postulated by Dr. Albert Einstein in 1916 as part of his general theory of relativity. An astronomer at Maryland, Dr. Gart Westerhout, told a press conference "This is a discovery comparable to the discovery of radio waves." Weber and Westerhout reported that the waves had been measured by detectors at both the university in College Park, Maryland, and at the Argonne Laboratory in Chicago. Weber had been attempting to find the gravitational wave since 1958, when he built a 3,000 pound aluminum cylinder as a detector for that purpose. Ten years later, it would be reported that "The response from the scientific community was almost unanimous in its hostility," and as other groups failed to detect the same results after building the same detection equipment, Weber would be referred to by some physicists as "The Don Quixote of College Park". Scientists would continue to search for confirmation of the gravitational wave and on September 14, 2015, almost 15 years after Weber's death on September 30, 2000, physicist Rainer Weiss of the Massachusetts Institute of Technology (MIT) would measure a gravitational wave for the first time using the Laser Interferometer Gravitational-Wave Observatory (LIGO).
- Dennis Martin, a six-year-old resident of Knoxville, Tennessee in the U.S., was visiting the Great Smoky Mountains National Park along with his father, grandfather and older brother on Father's Day weekend. Dennis apparently wanted to surprise the adults with his brother and other children from a separate family and decided to hide behind a bush, which was the last time he was seen by his father. After not seeing him for about five minutes and when all of the other children had returned to the camp site, his father became concerned and began searching for him. His father ran down the trail for nearly two miles, until he was sure he could not have gotten any farther. After several hours, they sought help from the National Park Service rangers. After years of searching, Dennis Martin's body was never found and it has been speculated that he had been attacked by wild animals because the forest had been known to have dangerous wildlife.
- Born: Steffi Graf, German professional tennis player, and winner of 22 championships in the four Grand Slam tournaments, including all four (Wimbledon and the Australian, French and U.S. Open) in 1988; in Mannheim, West Germany

== June 15, 1969 (Sunday) ==
- Hee Haw, an American television show aimed at fans of country music, was aired for the first time, appearing on the CBS network at 9:00 Eastern time. Popular with viewers, and hated by TV critics, the show was described by one reviewer as "a hayseed version of Laugh-In" with "probably the worst title of any show to come along this season" while another wrote "Country-Western it is. 'Laugh-In' it ain't." Hosted by Roy Clark and Buck Owens, the show filled the time slot formerly held by the Smothers Brothers and would run on CBS for two years, then spend 22 years in syndication.
- Former Prime Minister Georges Pompidou was elected as the new President of France, defeating Acting President Alain Poher in the runoff vote by a 58% to 42% margin. Pompidou and Poher had finished first and second in the first round of voting on June 1.
- Born:
  - Jansher Khan, Pakistani squash player who was ranked number one in the world from 1988 to 1998, winner of eight World Opens and six British Opens; in Peshawar
  - Ice Cube (stage name for O'Shea Jackson Sr.), American rap music star and actor, as well as co-founder of the BIG3 pro basketball league; in Los Angeles
  - Oliver Kahn, German goalkeeper for Bayern Munich and the Germany national team; in Karlsruhe, West Germany
  - Maurice Odumbe, Kenyan cricketer who was banned for five years from the sport for match-fixing; in Nairobi

== June 16, 1969 (Monday) ==
- The U.S. Supreme Court ruled, 7 to 1, that the U.S. House of Representatives had acted improperly in voting not to allow Adam Clayton Powell Jr. to take his seat in Congress after the 1966 elections. On March 1, 1967, the House had voted, 248 to 176, to bar Powell from representing New York's 18th Congressional District. After Powell had been elected again in 1968, the House had seated him but voted not restore his seniority for purposes of committee selections, treating the 24-year veteran instead as a first-time member of Congress and fining him $25,000. Writing for the majority, outgoing Chief Justice Earl Warren said that since Powell "was duly elected by the voters... and was not ineligible to serve under any provision of the Constitution, the House was without power to exclude him from its membership." Powell's suit was remanded to District Court for consideration of his claim for $60,000 in back pay for the two years of his 1967–69 term.
- Born:
  - MC Ren (stage name for Lorenzo Patterson), American rapper, songwriter, and record producer; in Compton, California
  - Sam Register, American television producer and President of Warner Bros. Animation; in New York City
- Died: Sir Harold Alexander, 77, British Army Field Marshal, Supreme Allied Commander of the Mediterranean Forces in World War II, and later the Governor General of Canada from 1946 to 1952.

== June 17, 1969 (Tuesday) ==
- Voters in New York City's primary elections rejected the nominations of incumbent Mayor John V. Lindsay (who was campaigning for re-election as a Republican) and of former Mayor and Democrat candidate Robert F. Wagner Jr. The two major party candidates for November instead were Republican John J. Marchi and Democrat Mario Procaccino. Mayor Lindsay, however, would win re-election in November anyway after running as a third-party candidate for the Liberal Party of New York. With almost 7.9 million citizens, New York was the largest city in the United States and, at the time, second to Tokyo as the largest in the world.
- Boris Spassky became the new World Chess Champion when Tigran Petrosian elected to accept a draw rather than to continue playing the 23rd game in the 24-game series. The game had adjourned the night before following the 41st move. With a win counting for one point and a draw worth half a point, Spassky had a 12-point to 10-point lead over Petrosian. Under the rules of FIDE, the World Chess Federation, the champion would retain the title even if the series ended at 12–12; the challenger needed 12½ points to win, and Petrosian's concession to have Game 23 end as a draw gave Spassky the 12½ to 11½ victory in the match.
- Born: Paul Tergat, Kenyan long distance runner, who held the world record for fastest 10,000m (26:27.85) from 1997 to 1998, and for fastest time in the marathon (2:04:55) from 2003 to 2007; in Riwo, Baringo District
- Died: Brian Sullivan, 49, American opera tenor with New York's Metropolitan Opera

== June 18, 1969 (Wednesday) ==
- The Students for a Democratic Society (SDS) began their national meeting at the Chicago Coliseum, and the 1,400 members ended up splitting into two factions. After reporters refused to pay a $25 fee for the right to watch the convention, or to sign an affidavit pledging not to divulge any information about the SDS or its members before any investigative body, the press was barred from the building. Bernardine Dohrn, the SDS press secretary, then issued a statement that "The capitalistic press will not be admitted to the convention under any circumstances." Although the Worker Student Alliance faction had 900 delegates, Dohrn and her followers organized as the Revolutionary Youth Movement which they would later rename the Weather Underground. By the time the convention adjourned on Sunday, the "Weathermen" had taken possession of the SDS national headquarters in Chicago and its records.
- Born: Haki Doku, Albanian paracyclist and holder of world records for greatest distance traveled in a manual wheelchair 121 kilometres (75 mi) in 2015 and most stairs descended in one hour (2,176); in Krujë
- Died: Edgar Anderson, 71, American botanist and geneticist

== June 19, 1969 (Thursday) ==
- Voting was held in Ireland, with 372 candidates competing for the 144 seats in the lower house of Parliament, the Dáil Éireann. Despite a forecast that Prime Minister Jack Lynch's Fianna Fáil party would lose its slim majority (75 of 144 seats) in the Dail to a coalition of the opposition parties, Fine Gael and Labour, Lynch retained office and Fianna Fail retained its 75 seats.

== June 20, 1969 (Friday) ==
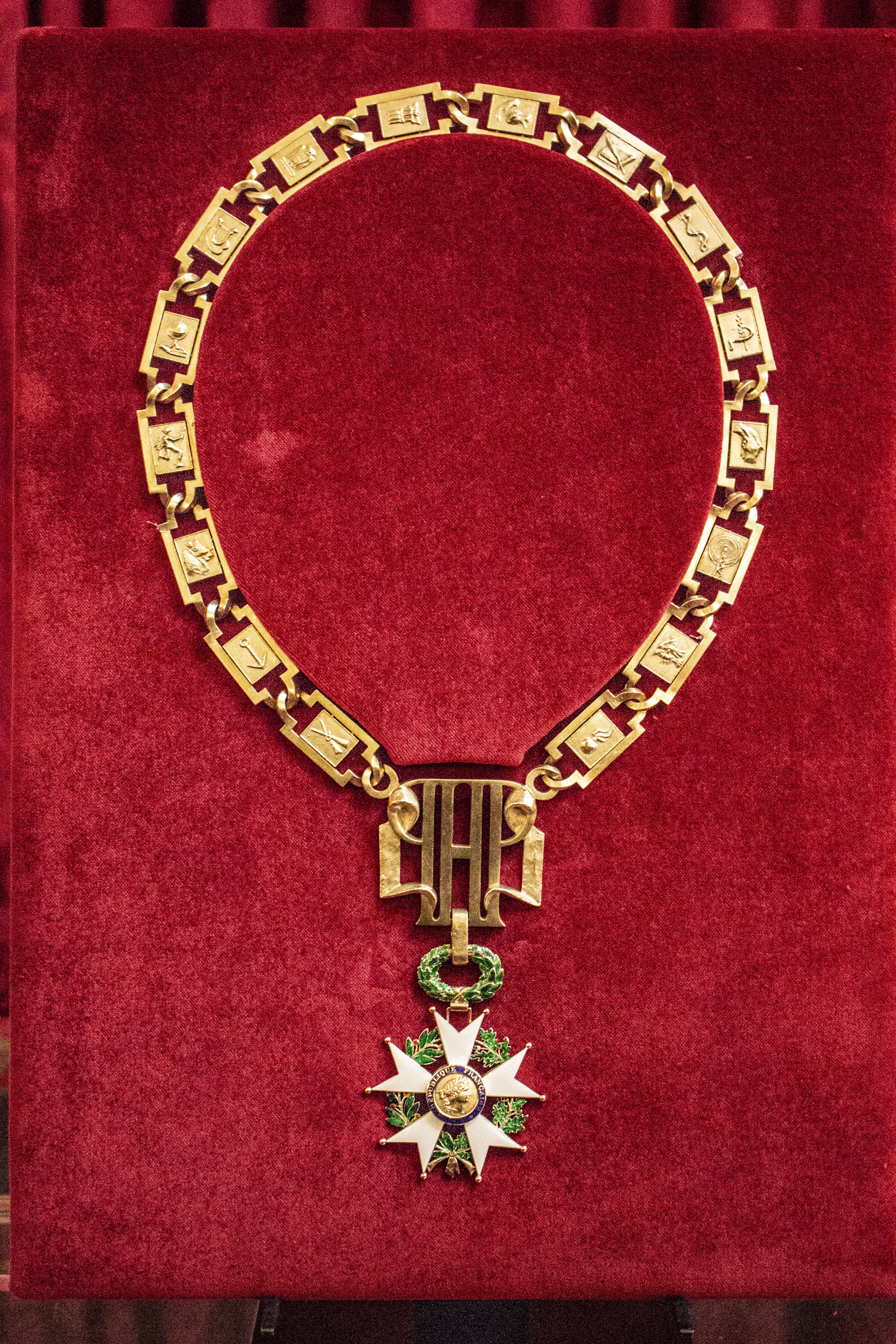
France's presidential collar

- Georges Pompidou took office as the 19th President of France at a ceremony inside the Élysée Palace in Paris. In accordance with French tradition, the Grand Collar of the Legion of Honor was bestowed upon Pompidou who, as President of the Republic, was also the Grand Master of the Legion. Admiral Georges Cabanier, the Grand Chancellor of the Legion of Honor, placed the symbol of the presidency upon Pompidou, after which the new President made a brief acceptance speech. As his first order of business, President Pompidou then named Jacques Chaban-Delmas as the new Prime Minister of France. Inaugurated for a 7-year term of office, Pompidou would serve for less than five years before his death from cancer on April 2, 1974.
- Voters from Rhodesia's mostly-white electorate overwhelmingly approved completing the southern African nation's last ties with the United Kingdom and making Rhodesia a republic with a President as its head of state. Out of a population of more than five million people, only 94,686 were eligible to vote and of that number; of those, only 6,634 were black Africans (0.14% of the 4,800,000), and another 2,307 were coloured Africans of mixed race or Asian descent. The other 85,745 were white, about 39% of the 228,000 white Rhodesians. The official result was 61,130 for a republic and 14,327 against.
- Born: Paulo Bento, Portuguese-born soccer football player for the Portugal national team, and later the manager of the South Korea national team; in Lisbon
- Died: Mohamed Siddiq El-Minshawi, 49, Egyptian Qur'anic reciter and Qur'an scholar

== June 21, 1969 (Saturday) ==
- Royal Family, a candid television documentary about the home life of Queen Elizabeth II, her husband and her four children, was broadcast for the first time and proved to be one of the most highly watched programs in the United Kingdom. The 110-minute feature, directed by Richard Cawston, brought cameras inside Buckingham Palace, aired at 8:00 in the evening on BBC-1 and was watched by an estimated 30,000,000 viewers. It aired again at 8:25 p.m. on June 29 on ITV, which had shared the expense of the production with BBC. American viewers, who had been alerted to the documentary in June, would be treated to a 90-minute version (including commercials) starting at 7:30 p.m. on September 21 on CBS. After 1969, the documentary was rebroadcast in 1972 and 1977 and never again, though a small clip was shown at the National Portrait Gallery in 2011.

== June 22, 1969 (Sunday) ==
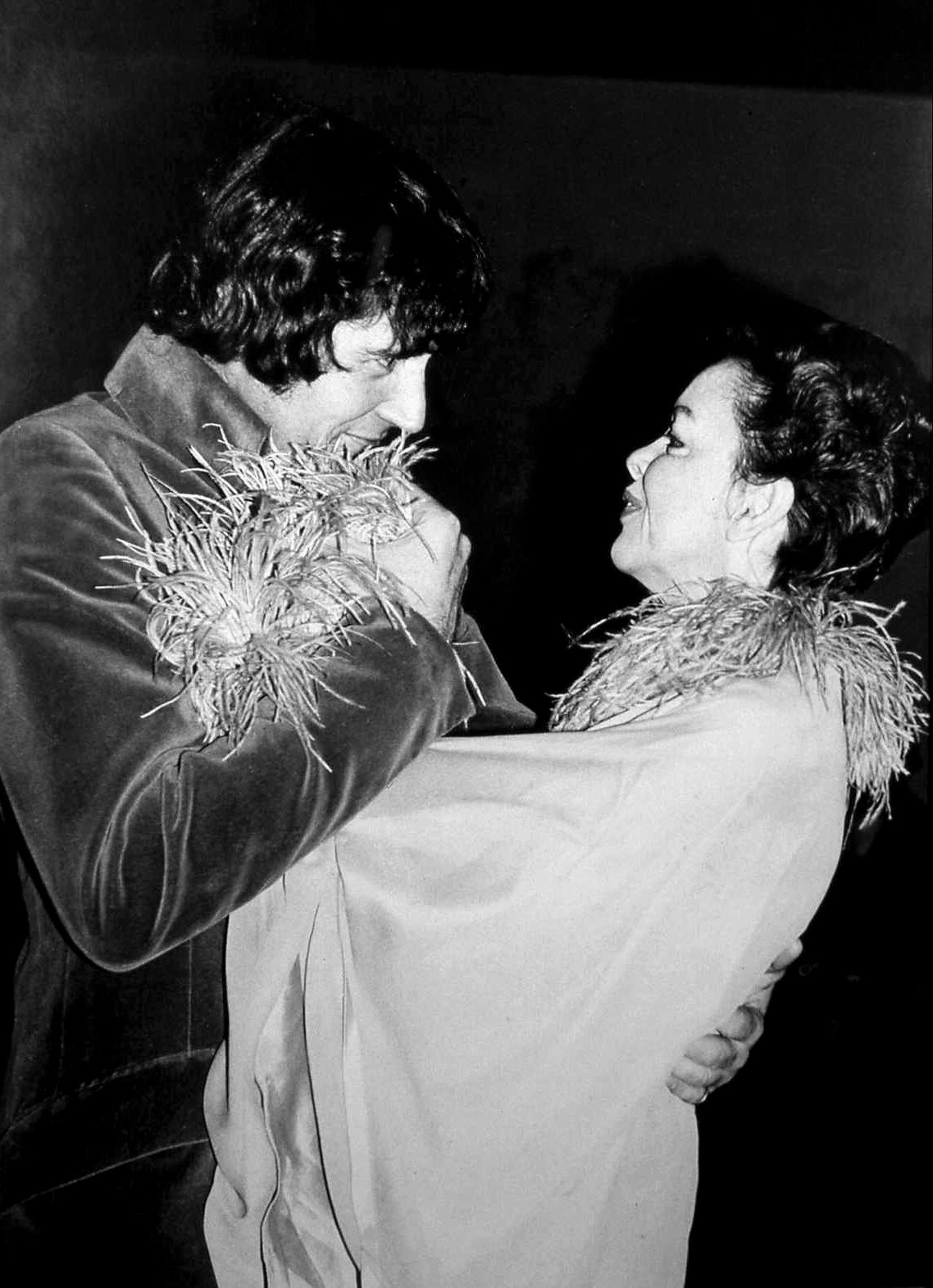
Garland and Deans in March 1969

- Actress and singer Judy Garland, aged 47, was found dead of a drug overdose in her London home on Cadogan Lane, three days after she had returned from a New York business trip with her fifth husband, Mickey Deans, whom she had married on March 15. Garland, who had been born in 1922 in Grand Rapids, Minnesota, as Frances Ethel Gumm, had been known for The Wizard of Oz, Meet Me in St. Louis and A Star Is Born but was plagued by drug and alcohol addiction during her adult life. The cause of death was attributed to an accidental overdose of barbiturates that Garland used for insomnia.
- The Cuyahoga River at Cleveland, Ohio caught fire after an oil slick floating on the river ignited. Factories along the Cuyahoga had regularly dumped their waste products into the waters for decades. Before it was extinguished, the floating blaze burned two wooden railroad trestles and warped the tracks, with an estimated repair cost of $50,000. Cleveland Mayor Carl B. Stokes, citing that the city of Cleveland had no legal jurisdiction over the river, called upon the state of Ohio to take action against the licenses of industries that polluted the river. In later statements, Stokes told a crowd that "We have the only river in the country which has been legally described as a fire hazard." The incident of the burning river would help spur an unprecedented American campaign against water pollution, leading to passage of such legislation as the Clean Water Act and the Great Lakes Water Quality Agreement. More broadly, the accident would focus attention on the threats to pollution in the air and the ground as well and would lead to the creation of a new federal government agency, the Environmental Protection Agency (EPA).

== June 23, 1969 (Monday) ==
- In the Soviet Union, 120 people were killed when a civilian airliner flew into the path of a faster moving Soviet Air Force transport and collided at an altitude of 2,935 metres (9,629 ft). The military plane, an Antonov An-12 had taken off at 1:25 in the afternoon from the Kėdainiai Air Base and was carrying 91 paratroopers and a crew of five as part of a formation of four An-12s on the way to the Dyagilevo air base. Almost 45 minutes later, at 2:07 p.m., an Ilyushin Il-14, Aeroflot Flight 831 departed with 19 passengers and five crew from Bykovo Airport, near Moscow, on a flight to Chernihiv. At 2:41, the Aeroflot plane began climbing from 2,700 metres (8,900 ft) due to turbulence, despite the ground control directive to maintain its altitude, at 2:52, the plane struck the An-12 about 28 kilometres (17 mi) southeast of Yukhnov. All people on both planes were killed, with the wreckage of the Aeroflot found near the village of Troitsa and the transport coming apart near the village of Vypolzovo.
- Six bystanders on a busy Miami street were killed, and 12 others injured, when Dominicana Air Lines Flight 401, a cargo plane, crashed and burned shortly after takeoff. All four of the crew died as the crippled DC-4 glided down NW 36th Street at 3:45 and impacted with a building on the corner of 34th Avenue, housing Charley's Auto Body Shop and apartments on the second floor.
- Warren E. Burger was sworn in as the new Chief Justice of the United States. Retiring Chief Justice Earl Warren administered the oath of office to his successor.
- Born:
  - Fernanda Ribeiro, Portuguese long-distance runner, gold medalist in the women's 10,000m race in the 1996 Summer Olympics and in the 1995 World Championships; in Penafiel
  - Martin Klebba, American actor and stuntman, known for portraying Captain Sparrow's crewman Marty in the Pirates of the Caribbean film series; in Troy, Michigan

== June 24, 1969 (Tuesday) ==
- A state of emergency was declared in the Netherlands and in three of West Germany's states for all communities fronting a 200 miles (320 km) stretch of the heavily polluted Rhine River. The declaration came after the discovery that millions of fish in the Rhine had been killed by an unidentified poison during the past week. The emergency was lifted three days later in West Germany after water samples showed that the river's toxicity had reached acceptable levels. The German government announced that the poisoning itself had been traced to the dumping of insecticide from an industrial barge as it passed the village of Geisenheim in the West German state of Hesse, about 8 kilometres (5.0 mi) from the town of Bingen am Rhein, where the first dead fish were discovered.
- Voters in Denmark overwhelmingly rejected a proposal to lower the voting age in Denmark from 21 to 18. Despite predictions that the amendment would win approval at the polls, an unusual number of older voters turned out and voted Nej by a margin of almost 4 to 1, with 78.6% against. Political observers speculated that the result may have been a response to rioting weeks earlier. On May 8, thousands of youths and student demonstrators in Copenhagen had clashed with riot police during a protest against a cinema showing the war movie The Green Berets.
- After white voters in Rhodesia voted to make their nation a republic, the last ties with the United Kingdom were severed as the British Governor, Sir Humphrey Gibbs, tendered his resignation. Michael Stewart, the British Secretary of State for Foreign and Commonwealth Affairs, announced also that the British mission in the Rhodesian capital, Salisbury (now Harare, Zimbabwe) would be closed, as would the Rhodesia House in London.
- Born:
  - Rich Eisen, American sports journalist; in Brooklyn
  - Sissel Kyrkjebø, Norwegian soprano; in Bergen
- Died: Westbrook Pegler, 75, conservative American newspaper columnist

== June 25, 1969 (Wednesday) ==
- Peru's President, General Juan Velasco Alvarado, announced the largest land reform law in the nation's history, limiting the size of land that could be owned and paving the way for expropriation of foreign-owned lands. The new law also authorized a government bond issue to borrow $275,000,000 in U.S. dollars to compensate land owners for the properties taken over, including land, livestock and equipment. Most heavily affected were the American-owned Cerro de Pasco Mining Company, the sugar plantation and pulp mills owned by W. R. Grace and Company, and the International Basic Economy Corporation.
- In Jersey City, New Jersey, 40-year-old Rafael Torres, a grocer, would use a baseball bat and knife to violently bludgeon and stab his wife, six of his daughters, and one of his sons to death while injuring another son in their home on Palisade Avenue. The massacre would become the worst mass murder in New Jersey’s history since Howard Unruh’s rampage in 1949 and one of the worst cases of familicide in American history. He was never convicted of the crime, but was convicted of an unrelated one. He was sentenced to 15-20 years in prison.

== June 26, 1969 (Thursday) ==
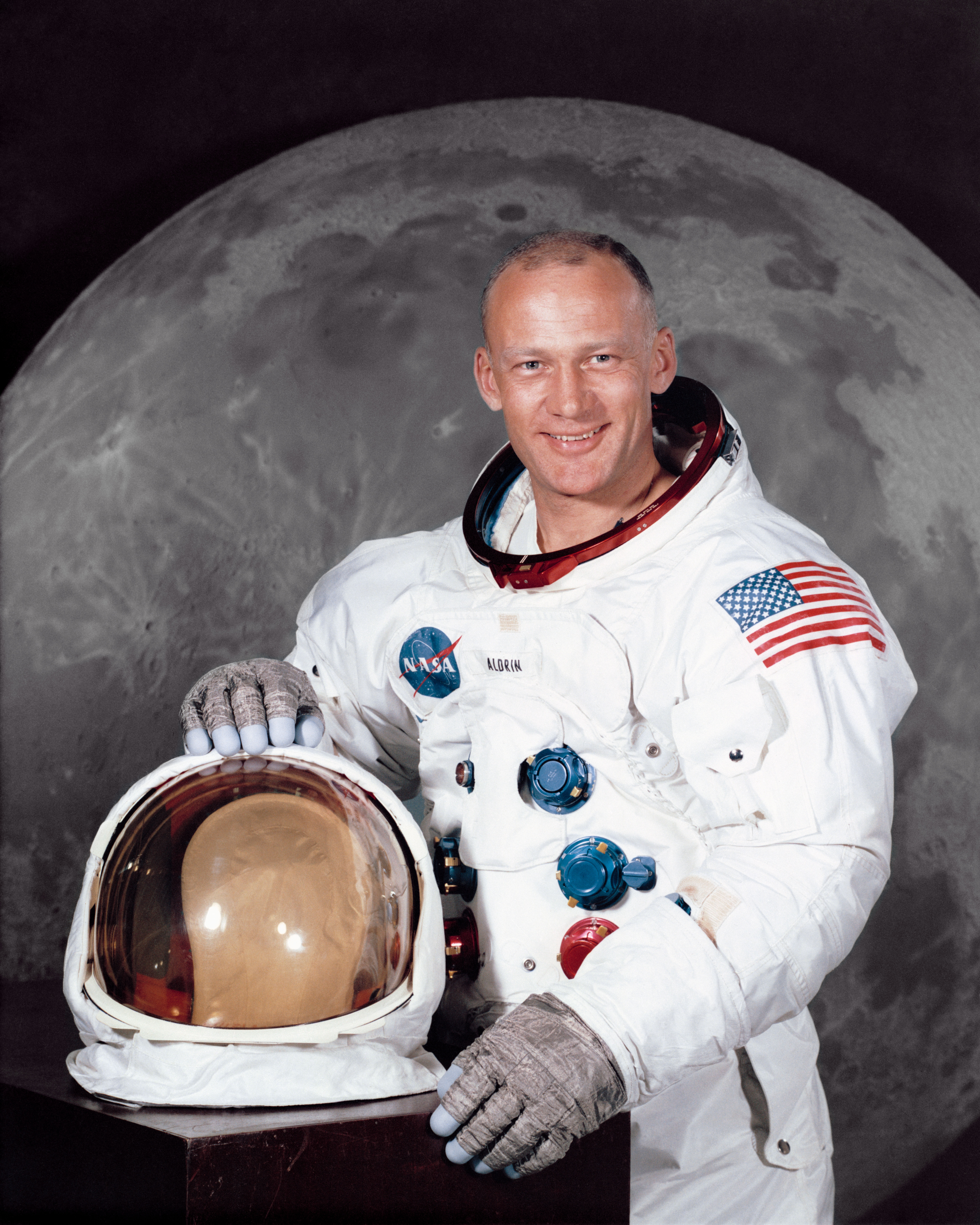
Aldrin

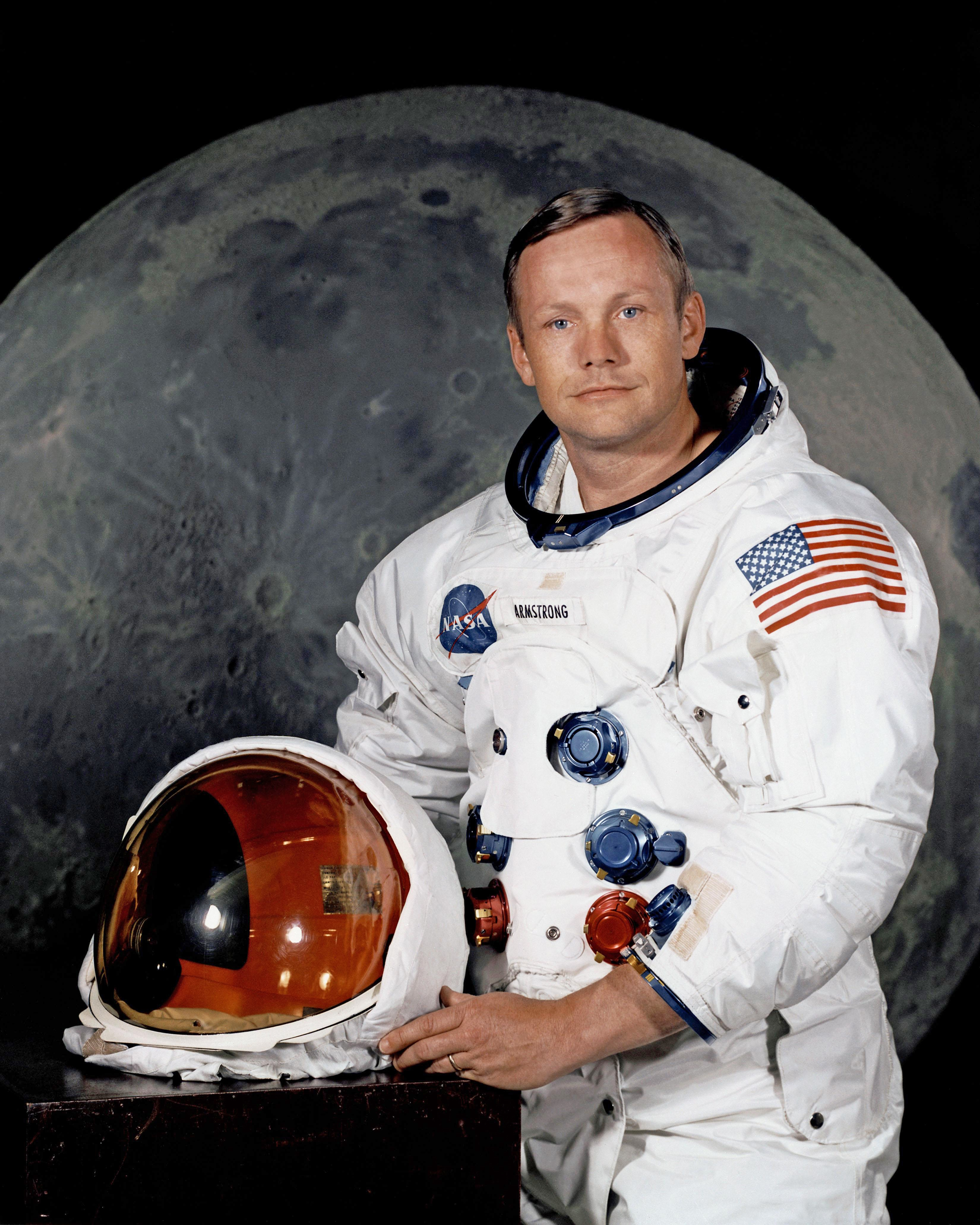
Armstrong

- A former NASA official told reporters in Houston that lunar module pilot Edwin "Buzz" Aldrin had originally been scheduled to become the first man to set foot on the Moon during the upcoming Apollo 11 mission, but that mission commander Neil Armstrong was "not unaware" of the importance of being first and that Armstrong decided to supersede Aldrin. "It shouldn't be that he pulled rank," said Paul Haney, the former public affairs officer for the Manned Spacecraft Center, "but I think he was not unaware of the importance of the first man who stepped onto the moon and he looked at it very carefully and decided that perhaps it should be the commander's prerogative." Haney added that the decision for Armstrong to be first had been made in mid-April, "Precisely why the change, I don't know, but I do know that it caused quite an upset."
- Born: Mike Myers, American baseball pitcher who played for nine different teams in a 13-season career from 1995 to 2007; in Arlington Heights, Illinois

== June 27, 1969 (Friday) ==
- In one of the most contentious qualifying matches in soccer football history, El Salvador defeated Honduras, 3 to 2 in extra time, at a neutral site in Mexico City. The win advanced El Salvador to the four team semifinal round to determine the CONCACAF representative in the 1970 World Cup; Mexico, as World Cup host, had already qualified automatically qualified as the other team from CONCACAF (the Confederation of North, Central American and Caribbean Association Football). Although the players of the teams shook hands after the match, violence in El Salvador and Honduras against each other's citizens had escalated after the teams had split their two games on June 8 and June 15 to force the third tiebreaker game, and by June 27, the armies of both nations had mobilized along the border that they shared in Central America. On July 14, the tensions would escalate into what would later be known as the Soccer War (or the Football War) with the Salvadoran Air Force bombing Honduran targets.
- Convicted murderer Winnie Ruth Judd, known as "The Tiger Woman" for the gruesome 1931 killing of two women friends, was arrested after almost seven years as a fugitive. Judd, now 64 years old, had been working as a housekeeper under the alias "Marion Lane". Originally sentenced to hanging, Judd was determined after her conviction to be insane, and was transferred to a mental institution, the Arizona State Hospital in Phoenix, before the execution could be carried. From 1939 to 1962, Judd escaped several times, the last instance being on October 8, 1962. Judd would be released two years later at the age of 66, and would pass away in 1998 at the age of 93.
- Criminal penalties against homosexuality and against abortion were eliminated in Canada, subject to certain conditions, as royal assent was given to the C-150 bill that had passed the House of Commons on May 14 and the Canadian Senate on June 13. Gérald Fauteux one of the justices of the Supreme Court of Canada, gave the assent to C-130 as eleven other laws on behalf of the Queen, and acting in place of the absent Governor-General, Roland Michener.

== June 28, 1969 (Saturday) ==
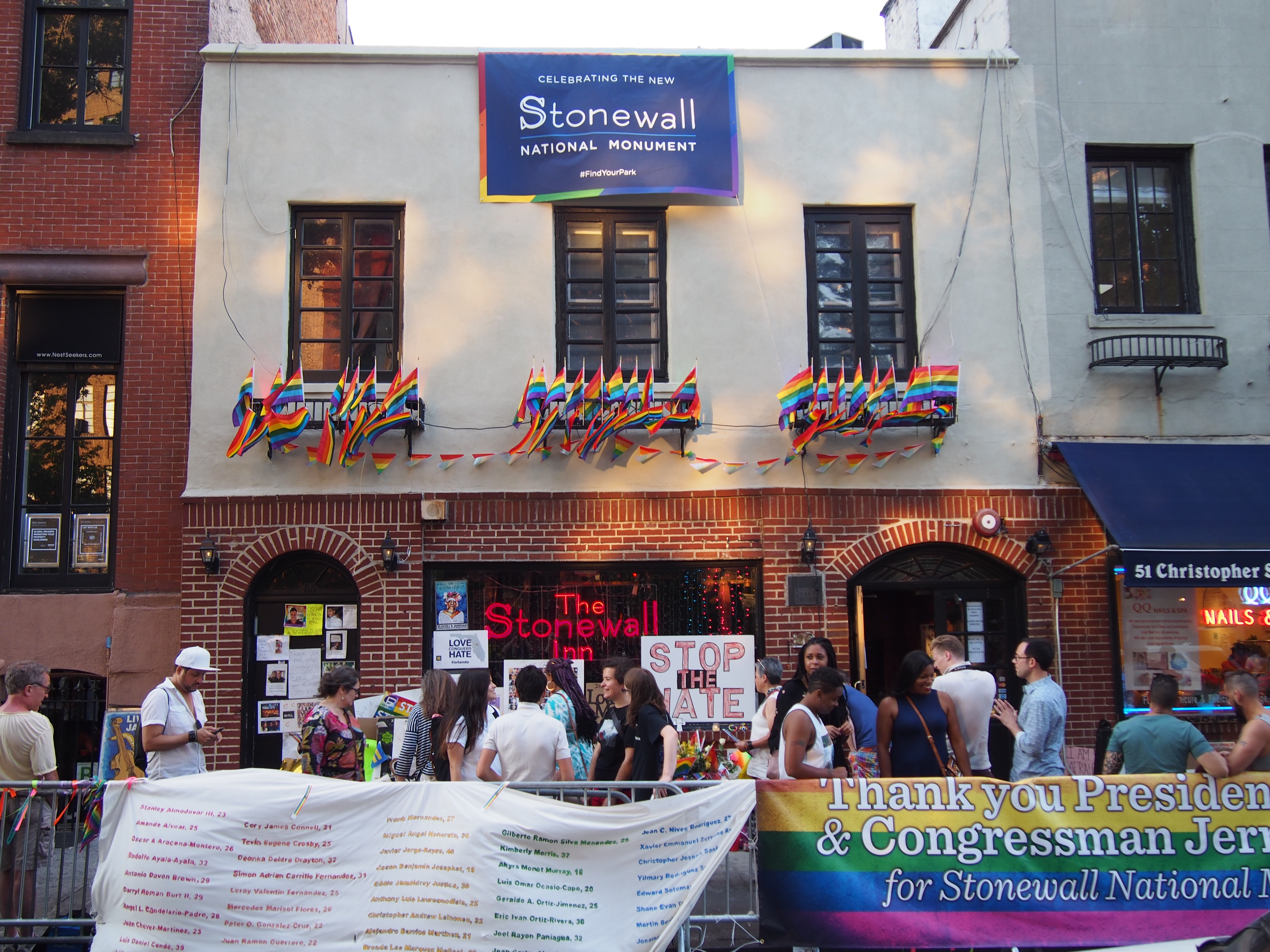
Stonewall National Monument

- The Stonewall riots, a milestone in the modern gay rights movement in the United States, began in New York City when an angry crowd of bystanders began throwing bottles, rocks and even a parking meter at NYPD patrolmen who were carrying out a routine raid on the Stonewall Inn, a gay hangout at 53 Christopher Street in the Greenwich Village section of Manhattan. At 1:28 in the morning, seven policemen came in to the Stonewall Inn, locked the doors, arrested the employees, and began lining up the patrons to transport them to a detention center and then releasing them, the usual practice for roundups. As one author would note later, "On that night, though, the customers did not slink off into the darkness. On that night, they stayed, gathering outside the Stonewall Inn. These raids— and the horrible treatment of gay people— had to stop." The trigger, on one of the hottest and most humid days of the summer, was when the police were forcing their way through the angry crowd to put one of the last customers into a police van. Accounts differ as to whether it was a lesbian who resisted arrest or a transvestite man who was violently shoved into the van.
- The United States launched Bonny, a pig-tailed macaque monkey, into Earth orbit at 10:16 p.m. (0316 June 29 UTC) as a passenger on Biosatellite 3. The intent was to keep him in the weightlessness of outer space for 30 days, longer than any living creature up to that time. Bonny, imported from Thailand and designated by the American press as an "astromonk" (as opposed to the chimpanzees used in earlier American missions, referred to as "chimponauts"), had been trained to operate a food dispenser that rewarded him for pushing one of four symbols on a screen. However, Bonny's health deteriorated over the next few days and he was returned to Earth on July 6.
- Born: Tichina Arnold, African-American TV actress known for Everybody Hates Chris and Martin; in Queens, New York

== June 29, 1969 (Sunday) ==
- The "Mailgram" was given its first test in a joint venture of Western Union and the United States Post Office Department as an experimental service to be introduced in 1970. Combining features of the more expensive telegram and first-class mail, the mailgram transmitted messages directly to the selected post offices which would then print them out and send them by a letter carrier the same day to the intended address. Western Union President Russell W. McFall, the President of Western Union, sent the first mailgram to Washington for delivery to Postmaster General Winton M. Blount.
- Nine passengers on an overloaded oyster boat, the Red Bank, died when the craft capsized in Ireland's Galway Bay near New Quay in County Clare. The Red Bank, launched earlier in the day, was giving local residents free trips around the bay when the disaster occurred.
- Died:
  - Moise Tshombe, 49, former Congolese Prime Minister who later led a secession of the Katanga province, had a fatal heart attack while imprisoned in Algeria.
  - Bart Lytton, 56, American financier who lost most of his fortune in the real estate market, died of a heart ailment

== June 30, 1969 (Monday) ==
- Nigeria blocked most humanitarian aid to the starving residents of the breakaway Republic of Biafra by telling the International Committee of the Red Cross and 19 other relief agencies that they would no longer be permitted to send relief planes to the starving Biafran population.
- Spain officially handed over Ifni, now Sidi Ifni city and territory to Morocco after 109 years of Spanish acquired it.
- Died: Augusto Vandor, 46, Argentine labor leader and President of the Argentina's largest labor union, the Unión Obrera Metalúrgica (Metal Workers Union), was shot to death in his office. Earlier, he had come under criticism from other labor leaders within the CGT (Confederación General del Trabajo or General Labor Confederation) for refusing to have the steel workers participate in a nationwide strike.
