= Flight 831 =

Flight 831 may refer to

- Trans-Canada Air Lines Flight 831, crashed on 29 November 1963
- Aeroflot Flight 831, mid-air collision on 23 June 1969
- Vietnam Airlines Flight 831, crashed on 9 September 1988
