= May 1969 =

Month of 1969

<<	May 1969					>>
Su	Mo	Tu	We	Th	Fr	Sa
				1	2	3
4	5	6	7	8	9	10
11	12	13	14	15	16	17
18	19	20	21	22	23	24
25	26	27	28	29	30	31

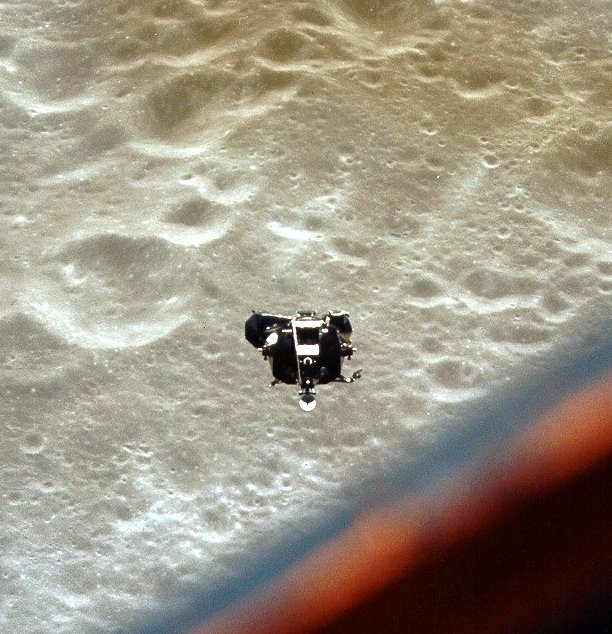
May 22, 1969: Apollo 10 astronauts descend to within 10 miles (16 km) of the Moon's surface

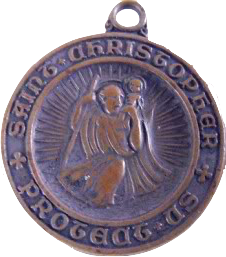
May 9, 1969: Saint Christopher removed from Catholic saints list

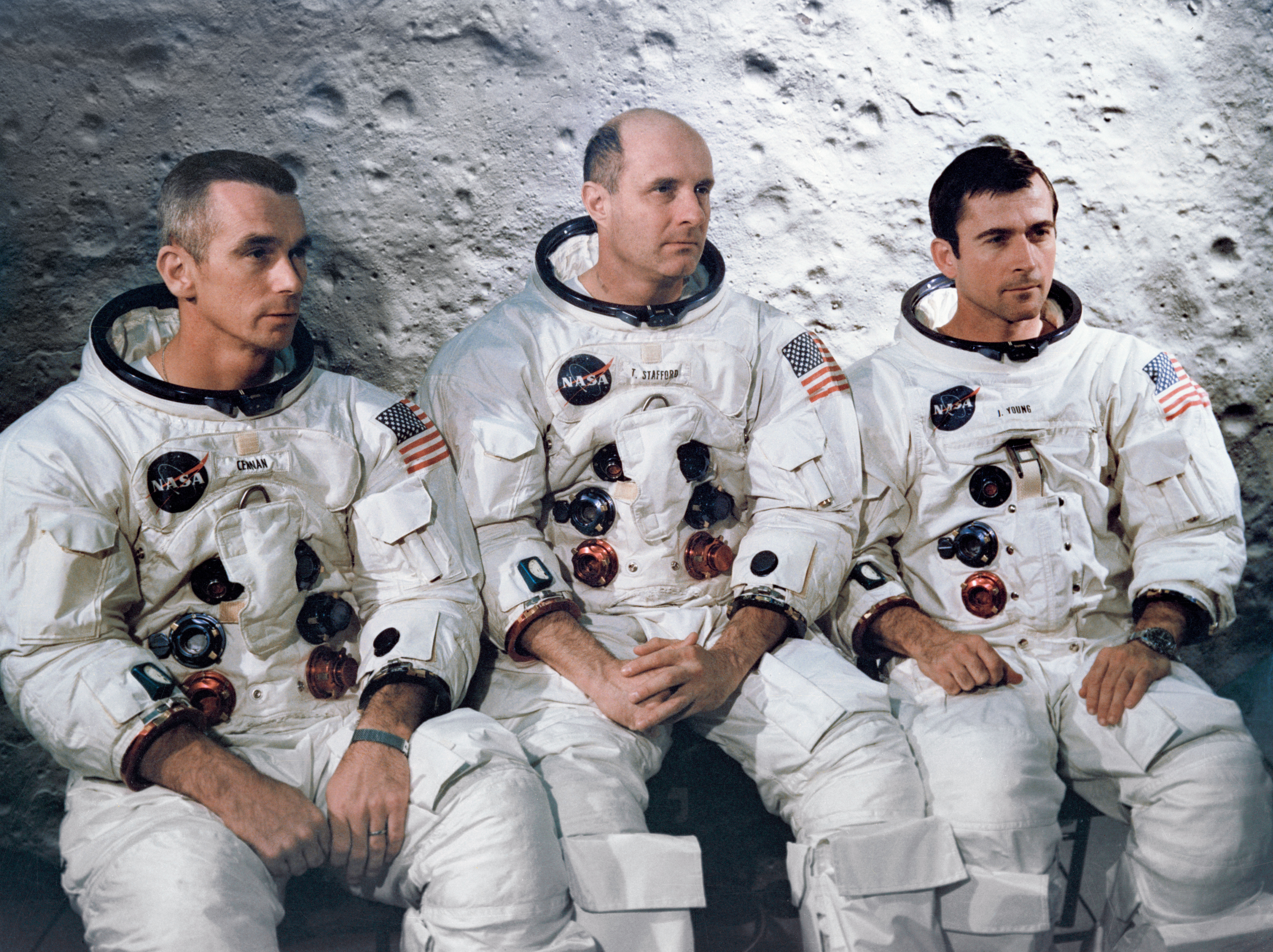
Astronauts Cernan, Stafford and Young

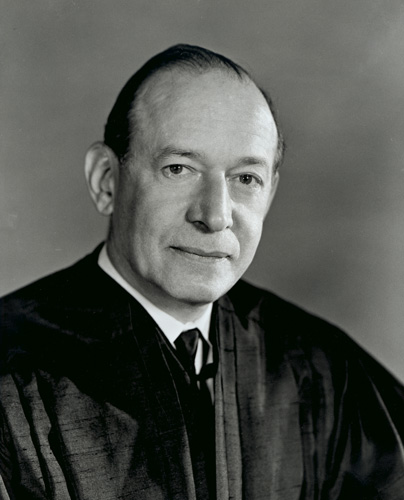
May 15, 1969: Supreme Court Justice Abe Fortas forced to resign

The following events occurred in May 1969:

== May 1, 1969 (Thursday) ==
- James Chichester-Clark became the new Prime Minister of Northern Ireland by being elected the new leader of the Ulster Unionist Party in voting by the 33 members of the Parliament of Northern Ireland. Chichester-Clark defeated party rival Brian Faulkner by a margin of one vote (17–16) and took office immediately to replace outgoing prime minister Terence O'Neill.
- Born: Wes Anderson, American film director and screenwriter known for The Royal Tenenbaums and The Grand Budapest Hotel; in Houston, Texas
- Died: Ella Logan (stage name for Georgina Allen), 59, Scottish-born American Broadway stage actress and singer, died from cancer.

== May 2, 1969 (Friday) ==
- The world's newest ocean liner, Queen Elizabeth 2 of the Cunard Line, set off from Southampton on its maiden voyage with 1,000 passengers and 400 crew. The $72,000,000 ship made the first private use of a satellite Global Positioning System, relying on "four U.S. Navy satellites to pinpoint her position within 100 feet" for navigation. An Associated Press reporter commented days later, "it means the days of dead reckoning and sextant are over." The "QE2", commanded by Captain William Warwick, arrived at New York City on May 7 and docked at the West 52nd Street pier.
- The farewell episode of Gomer Pyle, U.S.M.C. was telecast on U.S. television, with Private Pyle transferring out of fictional Camp Henderson after five seasons. Although the military situation comedy was the second most watched television show in its fifth season, Jim Nabors decided to retire from the program in order to pursue his own short-lived variety show, The Jim Nabors Hour, where his co-star, Frank Sutton ("Sergeant Carter"), would be a recurring guest.
- Born: Brian Lara, batsman for the West Indies cricket team 1990 to 2007, known for the highest individual score in first-class cricket history, with a score of 501 (in 1994); in Santa Cruz, Trinidad and Tobago
- Died: Franz von Papen, 89, former Chancellor of Germany prior to Adolf Hitler's taking of the office. Von Papen had been acquitted of all charges of war crimes at the Nuremberg Trial.

== May 3, 1969 (Saturday) ==
- Varahagiri Venkata Giri, more commonly known as V. V. Giri, was sworn in as the Acting President of India a few hours after the sudden death of President Zakir Husain from a heart attack. President Husain had returned to New Delhi the night before from a tour of India's eastern region and had been preparing for a scheduled checkup from his team of physicians when he was found collapsed in his room at 11:20 in the morning, and doctors were unable to resuscitate him after 40 minutes. Vice-President Giri had been in Bhopal to begin a tour of the Madhya Pradesh state. After being told the news, Giri was flown back to New Delhi and sworn into office after his arrival.
- Majestic Prince finished ahead of Arts and Letters and seven other thoroughbred horses to win the 1969 Kentucky Derby. Majestic Prince would beat Arts and Letters again to win the second stage of the American horse racing Triple Crown, the Preakness Stakes, but would sustain an injured tendon in the process. Against the advice of trainer Johnny Longden, owner Frank M. McMahon would reverse a decision to keep Majestic Prince out of the final jewel of the Triple Crown, the Belmont Stakes. This time, Majestic Prince finished second to Arts and Letters and suffered a career-ending injury.
- Italy created the world's first police division to specialize in investigating and combating crimes involving antiquities works of art. T.P.C. ("il nucleo Tutela Patrimonio Artistico, the Division for the Protection of Artistic Heritage) is a commando unit of the Carabinieri police force within the Italian Ministry of Defense.
- Died:
  - Karl Freund, 79, German cinematographer known for his invention of the unchained camera technique, for the 1927 sci-fi classic Metropolis, and for TV's I Love Lucy.
  - Amy Ashwood Garvey, 72, Jamaican political activist, wife of Marcus Garvey from 1919 to 1922

== May 4, 1969 (Sunday) ==
- James Forman, a militant black leader who had formed the National Black Economic Development Conference (NBEDC) and had issued what he called the "Black Manifesto" seeking $500,000,000 in reparations from white Christian churches and Jewish synagogues, followed through with his April 29 pledge to disrupt church services by appearing at New York City's venerable Riverside Church during interdenominational Christian services. Reverend Ernest T. Campbell signaled the organist and choir to play a recessional hymn to drown out Forman's attempt to speak while he led a walkout of the congregation. Campbell would later read Forman's manifesto and preach a controversial sermon, "The Case for Restitution", though the Riverside Church would decline Forman's demands for 60 percent of the church's income from investments. At least one house of worship, the Washington Square United Methodist Church in New York's Greenwich Village, would donate $15,000 to Forman's fund.
- In a repeat of the previous season's finals, the Montreal Canadiens completed a four-game sweep of the National Hockey League's best-of-seven championship series to win the Stanley Cup. The Canadiens defeated the St. Louis Blues 2–1 before a St. Louis crowd of 16,126 fans. The Blues had taken a 1–0 lead midway through the second period, but Montreal's Harris and Ferguson scored back-to-back goals in the first three minutes of the final stanza.

== May 5, 1969 (Monday) ==
- The Boston Celtics won the National Basketball Association (NBA) championship by two points in the seventh game of the best-of-seven series, beating the Los Angeles Lakers 108 to 106. The Lakers had overcome a 17-point deficit in the game's final 10 minutes, closing from being down 100–83 to within one point (103–102) before falling behind again 108–102. During the 1960s, with the exception of the 1966–67 season, the Celtics won nine of the ten championships played during the decade.
- Born: Hideki Irabu, Japanese-born baseball pitcher who played for Japan's Pacific League Chiba Lotte Marines (1988–1996) and in American Major League Baseball (1997–2002) for the Yankees, Expos and Rangers; in Hirara, Okinawa (committed suicide, 2011)

== May 6, 1969 (Tuesday) ==
- The United States Navy announced that it would not seek a court-martial against any of the crew of the USS Pueblo, whose crew had been held captive in North Korea for 11 months after the ship's seizure in 1968, and then were questioned in 80 days of testimony taken by the Naval Court of Inquiry in Coronado, California. U.S. Secretary of the Navy John Chafee disclosed that the court of inquiry had recommended a general court-martial against the Pueblo skipper, Commander Lloyd M. Bucher and the officer in charge of the ship's intelligence section, Lieutenant Stephen R. Harris, for allowing the ship, equipment and codebooks to fall in the hands of the enemy. Secretary Chafee said that he had overruled the recommendation because the crew of the Pueblo "have suffered long enough" and added that "I am convinced that neither individual discipline, nor the state of discipline or morale of the Navy, nor any other interest requires further legal proceedings."
- Thirty-four servicemen were killed, and 35 others injured, in the most deadly helicopter crash of the Vietnam War when the U.S. Army CH-47 Chinook helicopter experienced mechanical failure while flying near Khe Sanh. All but two of the dead were South Vietnamese Army infantrymen and officers; the other fatalities were the American helicopter crew.
- Born: Jim Magilton, midfielder for the Northern Ireland soccer football team from 1991 to 2002; in Belfast
- Died: Don Drummond, 37, Jamaican ska trombonist, died of natural causes in the Bellevue Asylum prison in Kingston.

== May 7, 1969 (Wednesday) ==
- The Oakland Oaks won the second American Basketball Association championship, 4 games to 1, over the Indiana Pacers in overtime, 135 to 131.
- Born: Anies Baswedan, Indonesian politician, education minister (2014 to 2016) and Governor of Jakarta from 2017 to 2022; in Kuningan

== May 8, 1969 (Thursday) ==
- The Sysco Corporation, the world's largest private distributor of food and related products to hospitals, schools, hotels, industrial caterers and other institutions ordering lower-cost foods in mass quantities, was founded in Texas by John F. Baugh, Herbert Irving and Harry Rosenthal. Sysco is an acronym for Systems and service company.
- The 1969 Cannes Film Festival opened.

== May 9, 1969 (Friday) ==
- Saint Christopher, formerly venerated in the Roman Catholic Church as the patron saint of travelers, was dropped from the Church's liturgical calendar along with more than 40 other names of people who had been designated as saints. The image of St. Christopher had been on millions of medallions as a symbol of a prayer for safe travel, and the Caribbean Sea nation of Saint Kitts and Nevis commemorates his name as well. The 40 names had been dropped following research within the Vatican that concluded that the persons identified as saints had never actually existed. In addition to Christopher, Saint Susanna — for whom a Roman Catholic Church for American visitors to Rome was built — was also dropped from the list.

== May 10, 1969 (Saturday) ==
- "Zip to Zap", the invasion of the 339-person town of Zap, North Dakota, by more than 2,000 college students and young revelers, was brought to a quick end by the North Dakota National Guard and local law enforcement. The uninvited visitors "transformed the main street of this tiny village into a shambles overnight", breaking windows, setting bonfires in the middle of the street, and destroying retail merchandise. The heaviest damage was to Zap's two beer taverns, "Lucky's Bar" (whose owner had stocked a side room with 10,000 cases of beer "in anticipation of the revelry" and had "left some young employees in charge") and "Paul's Bar". The event had started as a joke in the student newspaper at North Dakota State University, which suggested that students could come to the "Fort Lauderdale of the North" for a celebration. Village Mayor Norman Fuchs had endorsed the idea in a letter to several of the state's colleges, welcoming students to "good, clean, beer-bust, food-munching, tear-jerking, rib-ticklin' fun."
- The Battle of Hamburger Hill, which would prove to be the most costly U.S. offensive of the Vietnam War (with 72 Americans killed, seven MIA and more than 400 wounded) began as an air strike during Operation Apache Snow. Major General Melvin Zais ordered a U.S. Army jet and helicopter assault against North Vietnamese artillery on Hill 937 of the South Vietnamese mountain range of Dong Ap Bia, and paratroopers from the 101st Airborne Division were sent in the next day.
- Born: Dennis Bergkamp, Netherlands soccer football forward for Ajax Amsterdam, Inter Milan and Arsenal F.C. (1986 to 2006), as well as the Dutch National Team; in Amsterdam

== May 11, 1969 (Sunday) ==
- A fire broke out at the Rocky Flats nuclear weapons factory near Golden, Colorado, causing an estimated $40,000,000 in damage from plutonium contamination in two buildings. The Atomic Energy Commission did not disclose the extent of the destruction until May 20.
- Died:
  - Salomão Barbosa Ferraz, 89, Brazilian priest and minister for the Presbyterian Church, the Anglican Church and later the Roman Catholic Church, where he was one of the few married Catholic priests in modern Catholic Church history.
  - Fred A. Hartley, Jr., 67, U.S. Representative for New Jersey from 1929 to 1949, known as the co-author of the Taft-Hartley Act that guaranteed the right of workers not to join a labor union.

== May 12, 1969 (Monday) ==
- Winnie Madikizela-Mandela, the wife of jailed South African anti-apartheid fighter Nelson Mandela since 1957 and the most prominent woman associated with the African National Congress, was arrested by South African police and imprisoned in Pretoria. She would be held in solitary confinement for nine months without charges filed (as permitted by the Terrorism Act, 1967) before being indicted for violating the Suppression of Communism Act, 1950. In all, she would spend 16 months in prison and would write about the experience in the 2014 autobiography 491 Days: Prisoner Number 1323/69.
- The U.S. Naval Weapons Center began its classified "Project Gulf Q", a series of weather modification experiments in conjunction with the Naval Weather Research Facility and the Atmospheric Sciences Laboratory. In five of the 16 tests done over an 18-day period in the Gulf of Mexico, the Center was able to cause rain to fall within 10 minutes of the seeding of warm cumulus clouds. The report would be approved for public release in 1974.
- Born: Kim Fields, American television actress who portrayed "Tootie" on The Facts of Life and "Regine" on Living Single; in New York City

== May 13, 1969 (Tuesday) ==
- The Senate and House of Representatives of the U.S. state of Florida unanimously approved the Nineteenth Amendment to the United States Constitution, almost 50 years after the amendment had granted American women the right to vote. The amendment had taken effect on August 18, 1920, when Tennessee became the 36th of the then 48 U.S. states to approve it, and before the Florida legislature had acted upon ratification. Florida became the first to ratify since Alabama in 1953; South Carolina, Georgia, Louisiana and North Carolina would follow in the next two years, while Mississippi would not get around to giving its ratification until March 22, 1984.
- A U.S. Air Force F-101 Voodoo jet fighter narrowly missed crashing into a school at the English village of Steeple Aston in Oxfordshire. Major Robert Fipes, who was killed in the accident, was credited by the British press with steering the plane away from the school and more than 50 students, rather than ejecting after he encountered trouble. Fipes, a 35-year-old officer from Jackson, Tennessee, had encountered engine failure shortly after taking off from RAF Upper Heyford.
- More than 200 people were killed in Malaysia as fighting broke out in Kuala Lumpur between members of Malaysia's citizens of Chinese ancestry and the Malays who made up a majority of the population.
- Born:
  - Buckethead (stage name for Brian Patrick Carroll), American guitarist; in Pomona, California
  - Nikos Aliagas, Greek-French television host and singer; in Paris

== May 14, 1969 (Wednesday) ==
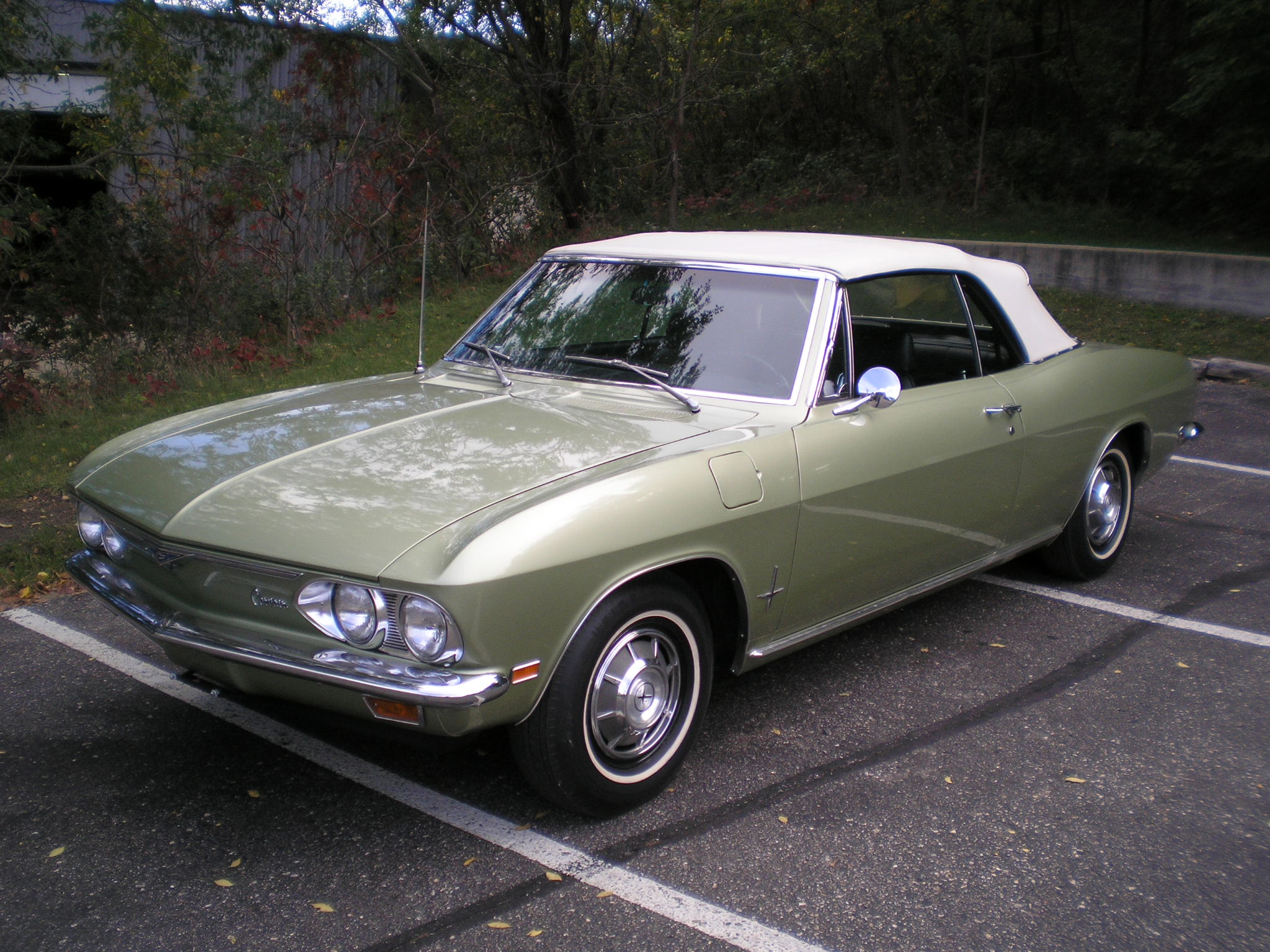
A 1969 Corvair

- The 1,710,018th and last Chevrolet Corvair, a 1969 Corvair Monza sport coupe, was produced, coming off of GM's Willow Run Assembly near Ypsilanti, Michigan. During its 10 years since the 1960 model's introduction, the Corvair was one of the most popular and most controversial cars, with sales falling after it was profiled in Ralph Nader's book Unsafe at Any Speed.
- The House of Commons of Canada voted, 149 to 55, to approve Bill C-150, a massive overhaul of the Criminal Code, including the first legalization of abortion of pregnancy. Formerly outlawed, abortions could be carried out at an accredited hospital if a panel of three physicians judged that continuation of the pregnancy would be likely to endanger a woman's health; because of the lack of a definition for the word "health" in the new law, anti-abortion groups have commented that the law "subsequently received broad interpretation" by the panels and by courts and that "[t]he mental health criteria served to cover up abortions done for convenience and socio-economic factors." The Criminal Law Amendment Act, 1968–69 would pass the Canadian Senate and then receive Royal Assent on June 27.
- Bill C-150 also amended the law to legalize homosexuality among two consenting adults aged 21 and over, formerly a crime prosecuted under the national law against "gross indecency", removed prohibitions against the advertising or sale of contraceptives, and set the first national standards regarding drunk driving (requiring drivers to submit to a breathalyzer test and making a 0.08 concentration of alcohol a statutory offense).
- Born:
  - Cate Blanchett, Australian stage and film actress, known for The Lord of the Rings film series, winner of two Oscars and three Tony Awards, as well as seven Australian Academy Awards and three British Academy Film Awards; in Ivanhoe, Victoria
  - Danny Wood, American singer and songwriter for the boy band New Kids on the Block; in Dorchester, Massachusetts
- Died:
  - Frederick Lane, 89, Australian swimmer and winner of two gold medals at the 1900 Summer Olympics"Frederick Claude Vivian Lane (1879–1969)". Lane, Frederick Claude Vivian (1879–1969). National Centre of Biography, Australian National University.
  - Enid Bennett, 75, Australian-born American silent film star

== May 15, 1969 (Thursday) ==
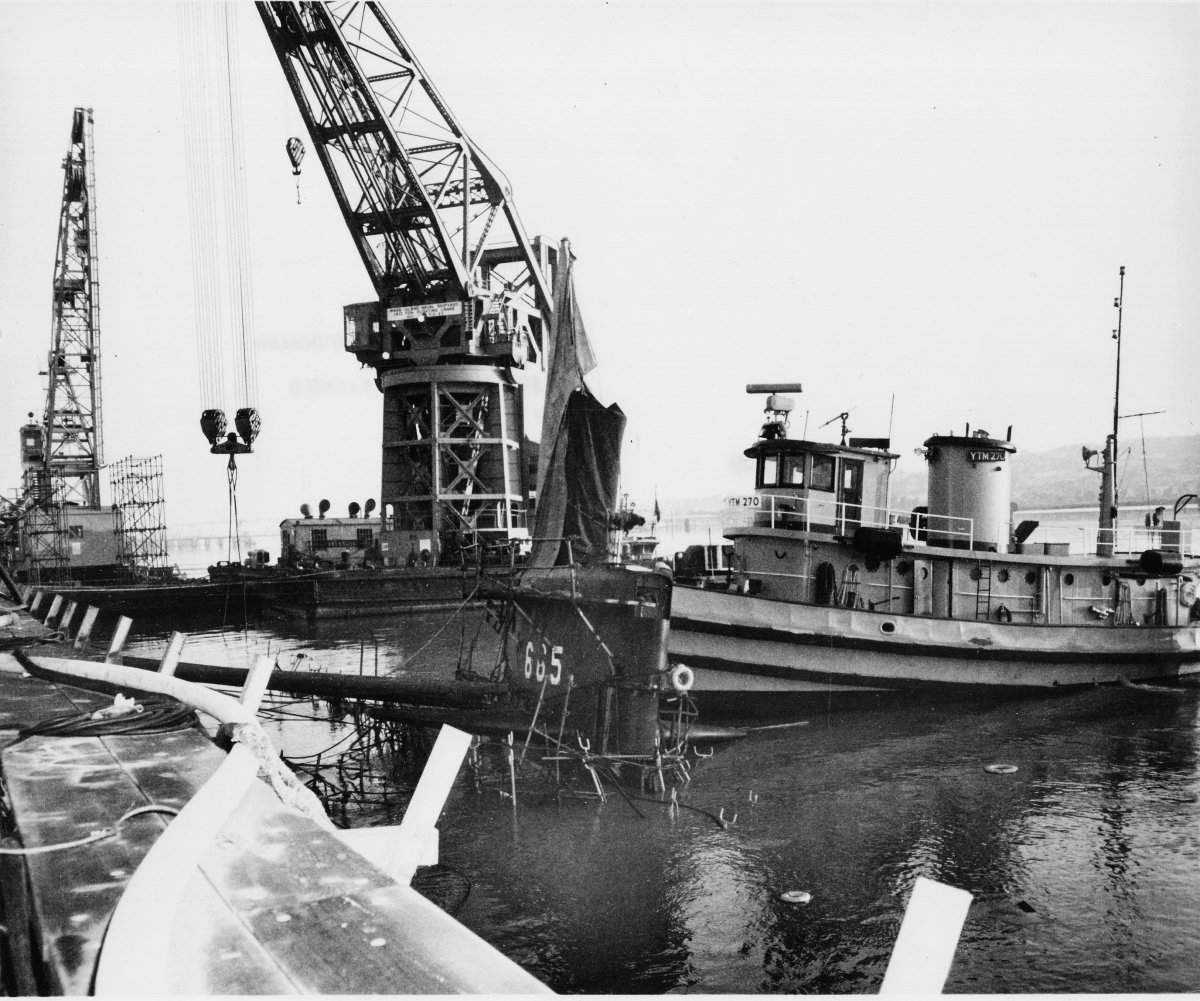
USS Guitarro

- The American nuclear submarine USS Guitarro (SSN-665) became stuck in the bottom of California's Napa River. Damages of over 15 million dollars, made by mistakes by two construction crews, had caused the submarine to take on water. Before the vessel could be raised, a U.S. Navy salvage team had to pump out 1,300 tons (1,200 metric tons) of seawater without letting the Guitarro roll over. About 10 feet (3.0 m) of the submarine's conning tower remained above water; Rear Admiral Norbert Frankenberger commented that "The sub's nuclear reactor was not aboard, thank God." The accident was traced by a Congressional investigation to a lack of communication between two civilian construction groups, with neither group aware of what the other one was doing, and both filling ballast tanks at opposite ends of the sub with water as part of calibrating instruments. The front of the submarine dipped low enough that water began pouring into an open hatch while the crew at the front was away for a 30-minute dinner break. Because of the number of cables and lines running through openings, responders were unable to seal the sub's watertight doors and hatches as water poured in. Not including the cost of refloating, the cost of repairing and replacing damaged equipment and electronics was estimated at between $15,200,000 and $21,850,000 in 1969, equivalent to between $105 million and $150 million in 2018. The Guitarro would be commissioned in 1972 and would serve the U.S. Navy until 1992.
- Abe Fortas became the first U.S. Supreme Court justice to resign as the result of a scandal. In 1966, while serving on the Court, Fortas entered into an agreement with a charitable foundation funded by financier Louis Wolfson, which contemplated that Fortas would receive $20,000 per year for life for services. The story of the pact with the Wolson Family Foundation — and Fortas's acceptance of a $20,000 payment — was revealed on May 4 by Life magazine. After the news was removed, Fortas informed Chief Justice Earl Warren of the details of the arrangement. The seat vacated by Fortas would remain empty for the entire 1969–70 U.S. Supreme Court term, until filled after 389 days by Justice Harry Blackmun on June 9, 1970. The U.S. Supreme Court vacancy would remain a record until 2017, when Neil Gorsuch's succession to the seat of Antonin Scalia following a 422-day vacancy.
- Robert Rayford, a 16-year-old black American teenager identified years later as "Robert R.", died at the Washington University medical center in St. Louis, Missouri, of complications from a baffling medical condition that caused lesions of Kaposi's sarcoma. In 1986, after the human immunodeficiency virus (HIV) had been found to be the cause of AIDS, Robert R.'s tissue samples would be examined and found to have had the antibodies to HIV and the P24 antigen, making Robert R. the earliest confirmed case of AIDS in America.
- Born: Emmitt Smith, American NFL running back primarily for the Dallas Cowboys, College Football and Pro Football Hall of Fame inductee, and the NFL record holder for most yards (18,355) in a career; in Pensacola, Florida
- Died: Joe Malone, 79, Hockey Hall of Fame inductee who holds the standing record for most goals scored in a National Hockey League game, with 7 for the Quebec Bulldogs on January 31, 1920.

== May 16, 1969 (Friday) ==
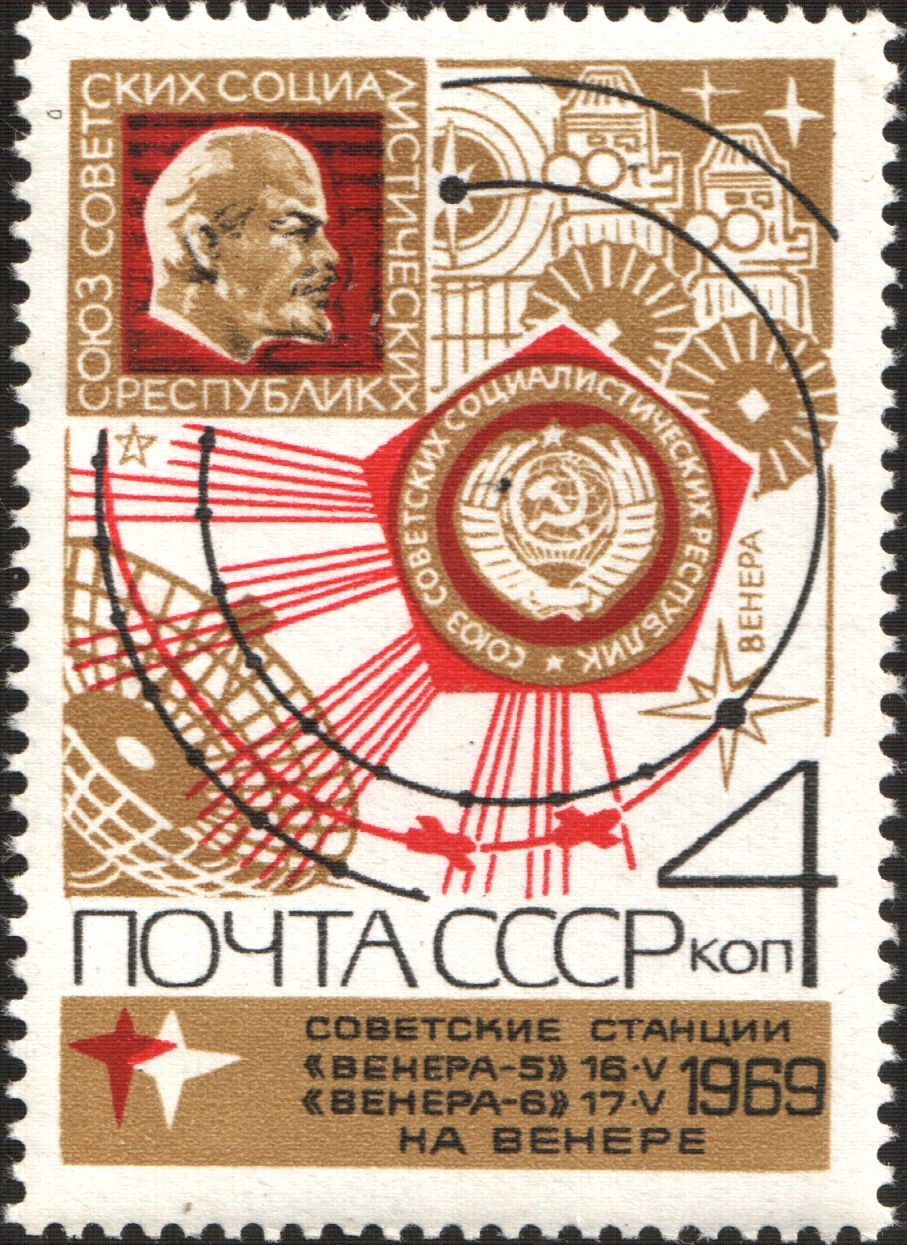
Venera 5

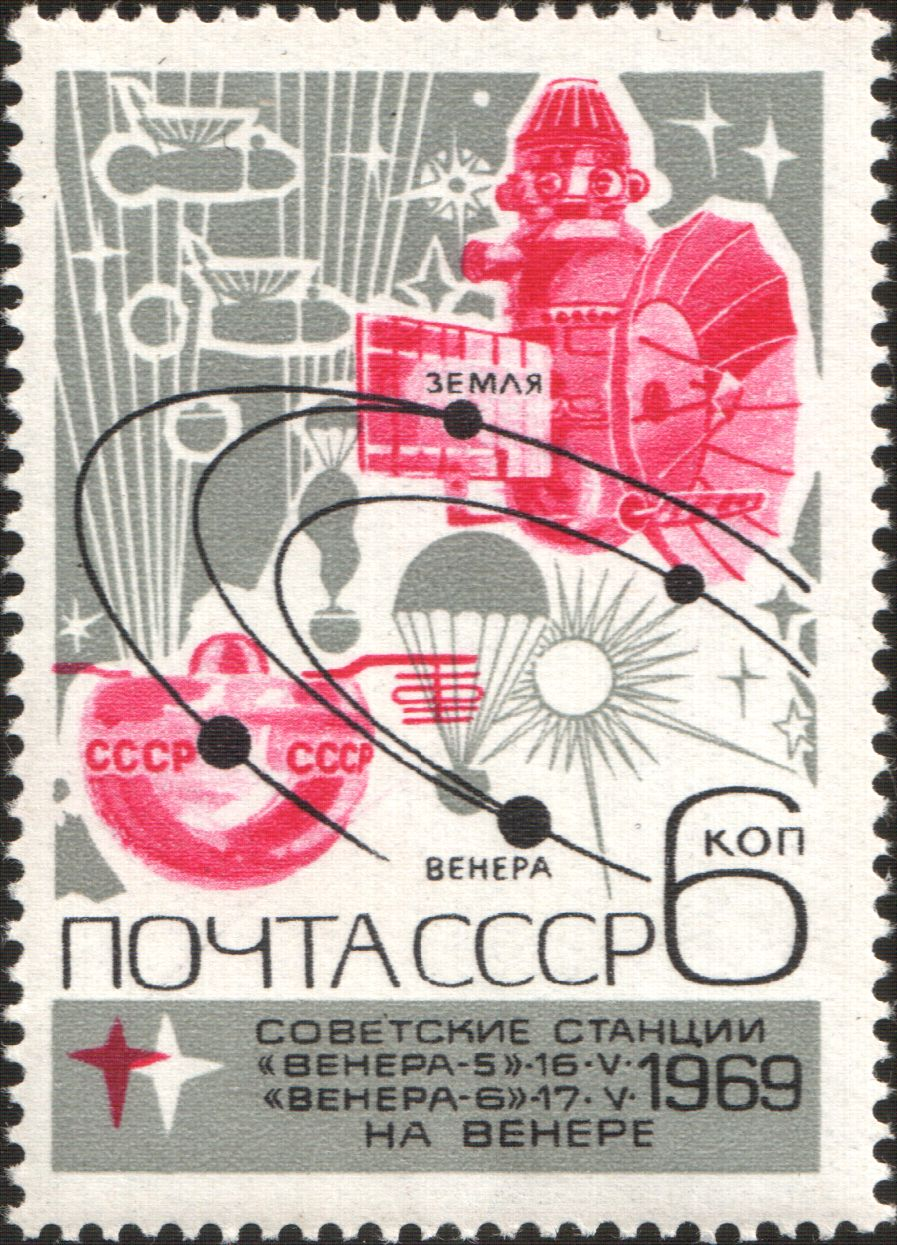
Venera 6

- Venera 5, a Soviet Union space probe launched on January 5, landed on Venus but ceased transmitting data back to Earth after 43 minutes of its descent through the Venusian atmosphere. It entered the atmosphere of Venus at 6:01 UTC and ceased transmission a 6:44 UTC.
- Born:
  - Tucker Carlson, American conservative political commentator who has hosted shows on Fox, CNN and MSNBC; in San Francisco
  - Steve Lewis, American sprinter and gold medalist in the 1988 and 1992 summer Olympics; in Los Angeles
  - David Boreanaz, American television actor known for Buffy the Vampire Slayer and as the star and title character of its spinoff Angel; in Buffalo, New York

== May 17, 1969 (Saturday) ==
- The Soviet probe Venera 6, launched five days after Venera 5, arrived after its predecessor and began to descend into Venus' atmosphere at 6:05 UTC. It transmitted atmospheric data for 51 minutes, ending at 6:56 UTC, before being crushed by pressure.

== May 18, 1969 (Sunday) ==
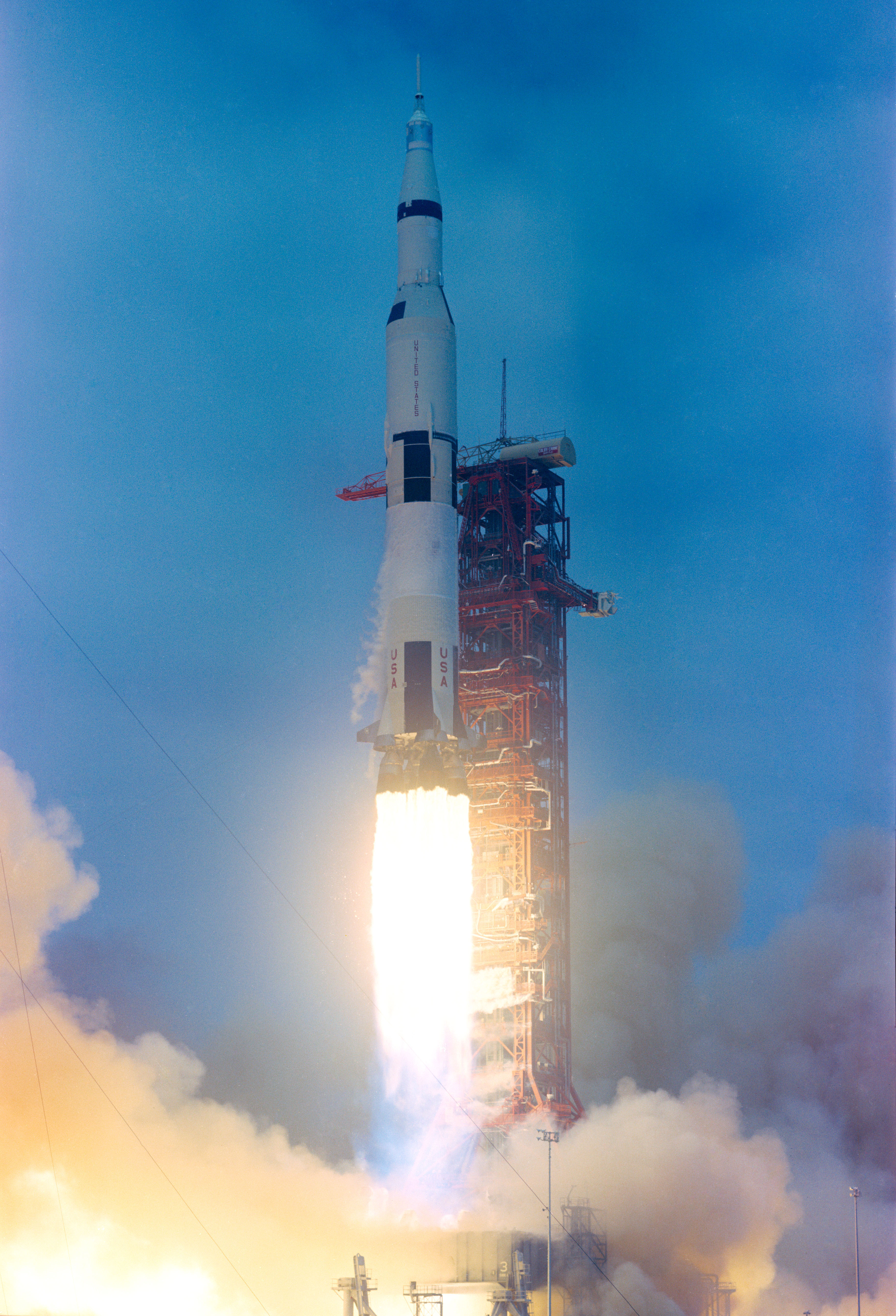
May 18, 1969: Launch of Apollo 10

- At 12:49 in the afternoon local time, Apollo 10 was launched from Cape Kennedy for what the Associated Press called "a dress rehearsal of a lunar landing mission" with the crew detaching the Apollo Lunar Module from the lunar orbiter and descending (but not actually landing) on the Moon's surface. After the ship made two orbits of the Earth, the engines were fired for the trip to the Moon at 20,000 miles per hour (32,000 km/h). When the ship was 23,000 miles (37,000 km) from Earth, the astronauts turned the camera toward the planet below to show television viewers on Earth "its first color portrait" to be seen live. Tom Stafford, Gene Cernan, and John Young were scheduled to orbit the Moon, with the most critical portion being Stafford and Cernan taking photos of "Apollo site two", within the Sea of Tranquility, from low altitude in order to prepare for the safe landing of the Apollo 11 module.
- Diane Toney became the first of three young girls in Connecticut to be kidnapped and murdered in the same fashion in a 13-day period. Diane, age 11, vanished from her neighborhood in New Haven after going to watch a parade. On May 27, 10-year-old Mary Mount failed to return home from playing in a park near her home in New Canaan, 35 miles (56 km) west of New Haven. Three days later, 14-year-old Dawn Cave vanished after walking away from her home in Bethany, about 10 miles (16 km) north of New Haven. The bodies of all three girls would be found later in the summer, all with fractured skulls. No person would ever be charged with the murders, although police would question another Connecticut individual who would be convicted of the killing in August 1970 of three young people with intellectual disabilities in New Haven in similar fashion.
- Born: Martika (Marta Marrero), American singer and actress; in Whittier, California

== May 19, 1969 (Monday) ==
- The name "Hamburger Hill" first appeared in the American press descriptions of "Hill 937" of the Dong Ap Bia range, as the number of American combat deaths since May 10 at A Shau Valley exceeded 50 for the first time. South Vietnamese troops had been sent in to reinforce the U.S. 101st Airborne Division, but the North Vietnamese Army had resisted more than a week of attacks and had refused to yield the hill.
- The English rock band The Who released the first popular studio album to be promoted as a "rock opera", Tommy, through Decca Records. Guitarist Pete Townshend created the backstory (described in the release) and composed the songs that furthered the plot.

== May 20, 1969 (Tuesday) ==
- A force of 1,800 U.S. and South Vietnamese troops captured "Hamburger Hill" on their 12th attempt to charge up the 3,000-foot (910 m) high slopes of Hill 937 to dislodge North Vietnamese troops. With more than 50 Americans killed and 410 wounded in a fight for a hill that Major General Zais acknowledged "has no tactical significance", the White House soon came under heavy criticism from Congress. However, Lt. Col Weldon Honeycutt, commander of the battalion explained that the hill needed to be taken as it overlooks a good deal of the A Shau Valley, which was a major supply and staging area for the North Vietnamese. Further evidence of the importance of the Mountain and the necessity to capture it came from U.S. intelligence officers who identified the area as being the headquarters of the 29th North Vietnamese Regiment.
- A California National Guard helicopter, called to respond to the sixth day of anti-war protests at the University of California Berkeley, sprayed "heavy clouds" of tear gas on the crowd, an action not previously taken in the state for control of protesters. Governor Ronald Reagan conceded the next day that a helicopter spraying tear gas to clear crowds might have been "a tactical mistake," but added that "once the dogs of war are unleashed, you must expect things will happen, and people being human will make mistakes on both sides."

== May 21, 1969 (Wednesday) ==
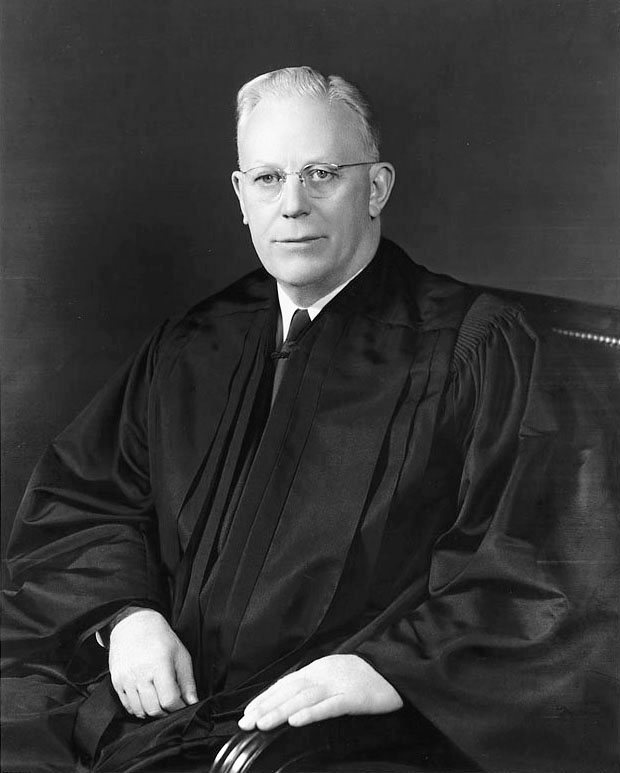
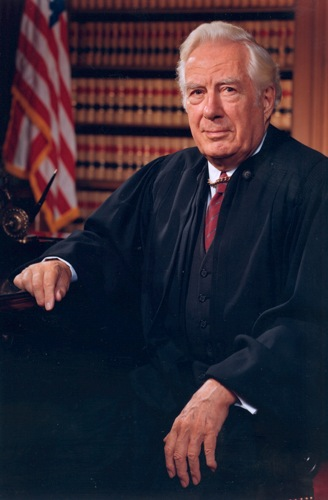
U.S. Chief Justices Earl Warren and Warren Burger
- U.S. President Richard Nixon selected Judge Warren E. Burger of the U.S. Court of Appeals for the District of Columbia to be the next Chief Justice of the United States. Chief Justice Earl Warren had previously announced his intention to retire after the end of the 1968–69 U.S. Supreme Court term.
- Yachtsman Nigel Tetley, who had at one time been the favorite in the Sunday Times Golden Globe Race, had to abandon his boat 12 days before he was set to complete the fastest solo non-stop trip around the world in a sailboat. On April 22, Robin Knox-Johnston had finished a 312-day journey. Tetley, who had left three months after Knox-Johnston, would have sailed around the world in 259 days, but the Victress fell apart 100 miles (160 km) north of São Miguel Island in the north Atlantic Ocean. Tetley inflated a rubber raft, and the tanker Prospero answered his radio distress call.
- Led by George E. Mueller, officials of the Manned Space Flight Management Council at the Manned Spacecraft Center (MSC) met to discuss the direction that the Apollo Applications Program should take after missions to the Moon came to an end. Regarding the next project, the Skylab orbiting space station, the group discussed whether to choose the Saturn IB "wet" Workshop or the Saturn V "dry" Workshop, and uses of the Apollo Telescope Mount (ATM) and Apollo command and service module hardware.
- Ireland's President Éamon de Valera dissolved the nation's parliament, the Dáil Éireann, and ordered nationwide elections for June 18. Dissolution came at the advice of Prime Minister Jack Lynch.
- "El Rosariazo" began as civil unrest broke out in Rosario, Argentina, following the death of a 15-year-old student.
- Born: Georgiy Gongadze, Ukrainian journalist and government critic who was kidnapped and murdered in September 2000; in Tbilisi, Georgian SSR, Soviet Union

== May 22, 1969 (Thursday) ==
- Apollo 10's lunar module, designated as Snoopy, separated from the lunar orbiter with USAF Colonel Tom Stafford and U.S. Navy Commander Gene Cernan firing the descent engines to make the closest approach up to that time to the Moon, coming within 15,400 metres (50,500 ft) (about 9.6 miles) of the Moon's surface, reaching its lowest altitude at 2130:43 UTC (4:30 in the afternoon EST). For eight hours, the module and the orbiter (designated Charlie Brown) were separated. At one point during the second low pass over the Moon, the module began rolling and Cernan was heard to say on live television "Son of a bitch!" before getting the vehicle back under control.

== May 23, 1969 (Friday) ==
- A U.S. Air Force mechanic stole a C-130 Hercules from RAF Mildenhall in England and flew the $2,200,000 cargo plane past the Isle of Wight in an apparent attempt to return to his home at Langley Air Force Base in the United States. Sergeant Paul A. Meyer, a decorated Vietnam War veteran, requested that the Air Force set up a telephone hookup to his wife in Virginia and refused to speak directly to anyone else. After a 2-hour flight, Sgt. Meyer told his wife that he had trouble with the automatic pilot, and the aircraft was presumed lost at sea. The wreckage would be discovered days later in the English Channel, and on June 11, American investigators would advance the theory than Meyer's aberrant behavior might have been the result of a chemical interaction between antidepressant drugs that had been prescribed to him, in combination with scotch whiskey and amines within English cheddar cheese, which he had been seen to consume at a party a few hours before stealing the plane.
- Responding to George Mueller's request for opinions, Manned Space Flight Centers Director Wernher von Braun recommended that the proposed Skylab orbiting space station use the "dry workshop" stage of the Saturn V launch vehicle rather than the Saturn IB's second stage, citing the Saturn V's "real and solid" advantages without any attendant program perturbations. Von Braun described an "organic and logical step for gaining experience" in long-duration flight and said it would "allow us to qualify subsystems for the full-fledged space station/space base." MSC Director Robert R. Gilruth concurred on May 26.
- Died: Jimmy McHugh, 74, American songwriter and composer of the melodies of over 500 songs

== May 24, 1969 (Saturday) ==
- A stuntman was killed in the filming of the West German action movie Cardillac while standing in for Gunter Sachs, a director who had a part in the film as well. Johann Tharaldsen, a 23-year old skier from Norway, was carrying out a scene where Sachs's character, Kunstsammler, was to speed down a mountain trail, "leap into space, shed his skis and parachute 1,200 feet into the valley" below the Italian Alps town of Canazei. However, Tharaldsen lost his balance, was unable to shed his skis or open his parachute, and plunged to his death.
- Died: Mitzi Green (Elizabeth Keno), 48, American child film actress and later a Broadway singer, died of cancer.

== May 25, 1969 (Sunday) ==
- Sudanese Army Colonel Gaafar Nimeiry led a coup to overthrow the government of President Ismail al-Azhari and Prime Minister Muhammad Ahmad Mahgoub. The new 19-member National Revolutionary Council banned public gatherings, closed the northeast African nation's banks and newspapers, and annulled the 1954 constitution. Former Chief Justice Babiker Awadalla was named as the new Prime Minister of Sudan, though Nimeiry would take over his job in October.
- Historical reconstructionist Thor Heyerdahl and a crew of six other men departed on the papyrus reed Ra I from the Atlantic port of Safi, Morocco, in an attempt to prove his theory that the Pharaoh's navy of Ancient Egypt had the skill to sail to Mexico and introduce their culture to the natives. Heyerdahl, famous for his 1947 Kon-Tiki expedition that sailed a log raft from South America to Polynesia, had used images of similar boats constructed 5,000 years earlier.
- Midnight Cowboy, an X-rated, Oscar-winning John Schlesinger film, was released to theaters.
- Born:
  - Anne Heche, American TV and film actress (d. 2022); in Aurora, Ohio
  - Stacy London, American stylist and fashion consultant; in New York City

== May 26, 1969 (Monday) ==
- Apollo 10 returned to Earth, after a successful 8-day test of all the components needed for the upcoming first crewed Moon landing. The aircraft carrier USS Princeton was within 3 miles (4.8 km) of the splashdown target in the South Pacific and recovered the capsule. The three astronauts — Cernan, Stafford and Young — were the first to have returned from space clean-shaven after demonstrating that they could use an ordinary razor and cream without the danger of hair bristles floating in the cabin.
- The Andean Pact (Andean Group), a South American free trade area, was established.
- Born: Siri Lindley, American triathlete; in Greenwich, Connecticut

== May 27, 1969 (Tuesday) ==
- Los Angeles Mayor Sam Yorty won a runoff election in an upset victory over Tom Bradley, despite having finished a distant second in the April 1 voting. Black city councilman Bradley afterwards accused Yorty, who was white, of having made a "blatant appeal to racial prejudice and the kind of fears that were being fanned by the Yorty camp". Among other statements, Yorty had charged that Bradley had surrounded himself with black militants. Neither Yorty nor Bradley, both Democrats, had won a majority of the vote in April when they had been part of a field of four major candidates (and 10 minor ones), but Bradley had finished more than 110,000 votes ahead of Yorty.
- Died:
  - Jeffrey Hunter (Henry McKinnies, Jr.), 42, American film and television actor who portrayed Jesus in the 1961 film King of Kings, starred in the title role of the 1963 TV western Temple Houston, and was the original choice for the lead role in Star Trek, died from an intracranial hemorrhage and skull fracture related to injuries six months earlier.
  - Fodeba Keita, 48, former Minister of Defense for the Republic of Guinea, along with finance Minister Barry Diawadou, former public works secretary Karim Fofana, Civil Service Secretary Kaman Diaby, and seven other people, were executed for their roles in a failed plot to overthrow the government of Guinean dictator Sekou Toure.
  - Muhammad Fareed Didi, 68, the last Sultan of Maldives until the monarchy was abolished in 1968

== May 28, 1969 (Wednesday) ==
- Pierino Prati of AC Milan scored three goals in a 4 to 1 win over Ajax Amsterdam to win soccer football's European Cup, played in Santiago Bernabéu Stadium in Madrid. Milan would go on to defeat the South American club champion, Argentina's Estudiantes de La Plata, in the two-match 1969 Intercontinental Cup.
- Twenty employees of a dynamite factory were killed, and 33 others injured, in an explosion near the city of Arequipa.
- Born: Rob Ford, controversial Canadian politician who had notable substance abuse problems during his tenure as Mayor of Toronto from 2010 to 2014 (d. 2016); in Etobicoke, Ontario
- Died: Emilio Bigi, 58, Paraguayan-born South American musician, composer and songwriter

== May 29, 1969 (Thursday) ==
- El Cordobazo, a general strike by the General Confederation of Labor began in Córdoba in Argentina, with protests that led to rioting. Four civilians were killed in the first day of violence. The next day, Argentine Army troops opened fire on 1,000 workers and students, wounding an undetermined number of them. When El Cordobazo ended, most of the 3,000 Argentine troops in the city were pulled out on June 2. The final official death toll was 14 people killed, 100 injured and $14,000,000 in property damage.

== May 30, 1969 (Friday) ==
- Mario Andretti won his first and only Indianapolis 500 race, becoming the first race car driver to win both the premier American races for Formula One cars and for NASCAR stock cars. Andretti had previously won the 1967 Daytona 500. Andretti, who had sustained facial burns in a crash during practice runs on May 21, set a new Indy record with an average speed of 156.867 miles per hour (252.453 km/h) to complete the race in 3 hours and 11 minutes.
- Riots in Curaçao marked the start of an Afro-Caribbean civil rights movement on the island in the Netherlands Antilles. About 5,000 oil refinery workers went on strike and then began setting fires and looting stores in Willemstad. As many as 90 percent of the island's population was black, while the Netherlands colonial administrators and corporate officers were white.

== May 31, 1969 (Saturday) ==
- The tightening Soviet Union grip on Czechoslovakia continued with the announcement by KSČ General Secretary Gustáv Husák of the removal of eight liberal members of the Communist Party's Central Committee. Among the more prominent members removed were economist Ota Šik and National Front leader František Kriegel, one of two Central Committee members who had voted against the October 18 treaty permitting occupation of Czechoslovakia by Soviet troops.
