= 1969 Yukhnov mid-air collision =

Aviation incident in the Soviet Union

Accident
- Date: 23 June 1969
- Summary: Mid-air collision
- Site: near Poroslitsy village, Yukhnov district, Kaluga region, Soviet Union; - Аn-12 54°35′53.51″N 35°36′27.86″E; Il-14 54°36′8″N 35°32′59″E
- Total fatalities: 120

First aircraft
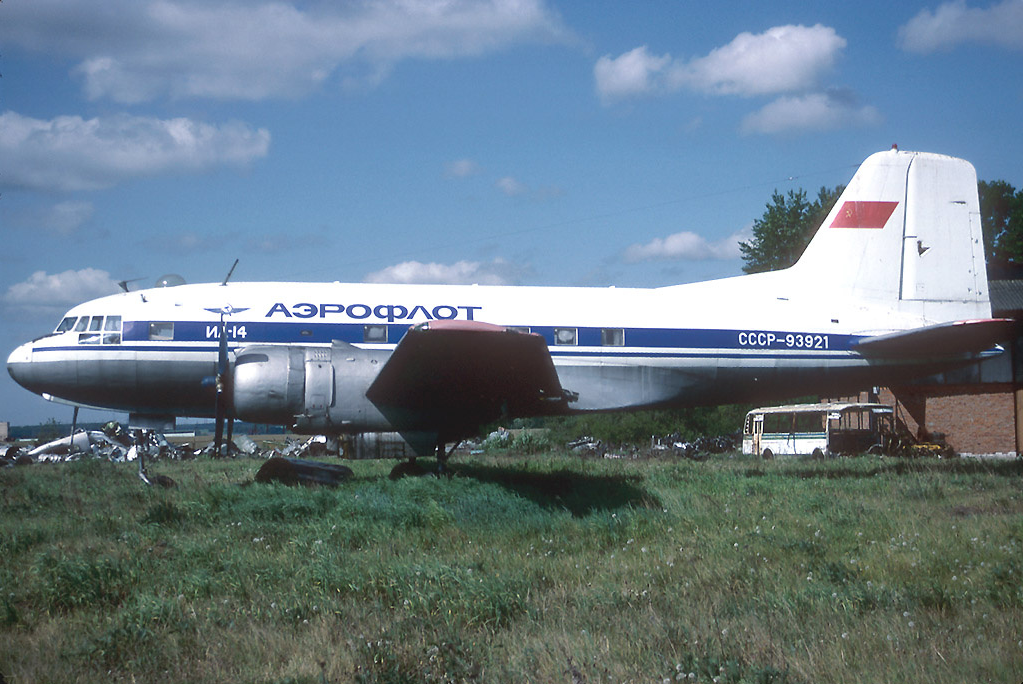
- An Aeroflot Ilyushin Il-14, similar to the one involved in the collision
- Type: Ilyushin Il-14M
- Operator: Aeroflot
- Registration: CCCP-52018
- Flight origin: Bykovo Airport
- Stopover: Chernihiv Shestovytsia Airport
- Destination: Simferopol International Airport
- Passengers: 19
- Crew: 5
- Fatalities: 24
- Survivors: 0

Second aircraft
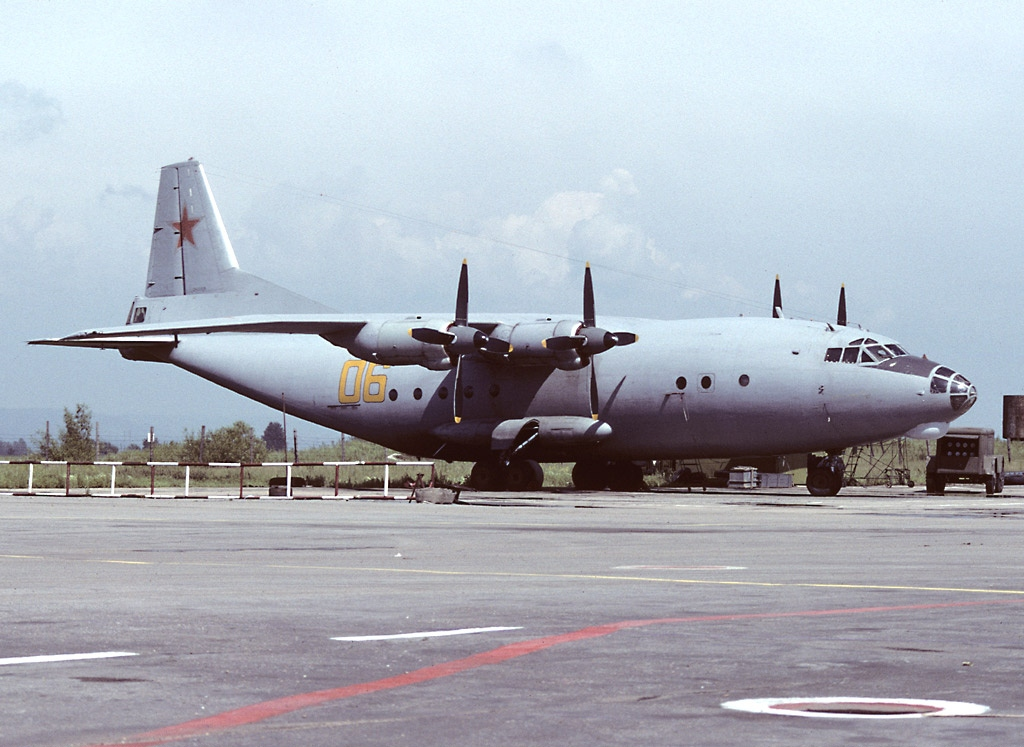
- An Antonov An-12BP, similar to the one involved in the collision
- Type: Antonov An-12BP
- Operator: Soviet Air Force
- Call sign: 08525
- Flight origin: Kėdainiai Air Base
- Stopover: Aleksotas Airport
- Destination: Dyagilevo Air Base
- Passengers: 91
- Crew: 5
- Fatalities: 96
- Survivors: 0

The 1969 Yukhnov mid-air collision occurred when an Ilyushin Il-14M, operating as Aeroflot Flight 831, a scheduled domestic passenger flight from Moscow-Bykovo Airport to Simferopol Airport, Crimea collided in the air on 23 June 1969 with an Antonov An-12BP of the Soviet Air Force over the Yukhnovsky district of Kaluga Oblast, in the Russian SFSR of the Soviet Union. All 120 occupants of both aircraft perished in the crash.

== Aircraft involved ==
=== Aeroflot Flight 831 ===
The aircraft was an Ilyushin Il-14M registered CCCP-52018 to the Ukraine division of Aeroflot. At the time of the accident, the aircraft had 24,653 flight hours. Five crew members and 19 passengers were aboard Flight 831. The cockpit crew included Captain Georgy Pavlenko and copilot Viktor Pavlovich Buyanov.

=== Soviet Air Force Antonov An-12BP ===
The Antonov An-12 belonging to the Soviet Air Force that was involved in the accident (callsign 08525) was part of a formation of four aircraft demonstrating tactical flight maneuvers to the Minister of Defense, Andrei Grechko. Two of the aircraft were transporting equipment; the other two, including the one involved in the crash, was carrying paratroopers of the 7th Guards Mountain Air Assault Division. The five flight crew members and 91 paratroopers aboard the aircraft, all perished in the crash. The cockpit crew consisted of the following pilots: Major Alexei Ryabtsev, Junior lieutenant Vladimir Priplov, and Captain Nikolai Mikhailovich Maslyuk.

== Crash details ==
At 13:25 the An-12 involved in the accident (callsign 08525) took off from Kėdainiai Air Base, and was the last one in a formation of four to take off. The four An-12s took off in 8-10 minute intervals and held altitudes between 3,000 and 3,600 m (9,800 and 11,800 ft).

At 14:07 the Ilyushin Il-14 took off from Bykovo Airport and climbed to the assigned altitude of 2,700 m (8,900 ft).

At 14:40:55 the crew of Il-14 contacted air traffic control and requested permission to climb to 3,300 m (10,800 ft) due to severe turbulence and cumulus clouds. Due to the An-12s at 3,000 m (9,800 ft), the controller instead offered to grant permission for the flight to descend to 2,700 m (8,900 ft), but the pilots of the Il-14 declined the offer because the turbulence may be worse at a lower altitude.

At 14:50:17 the An-12 passed over Yukhnov and was switched to another controller and confirmed that they were at an altitude of 3,000 m (9,800 ft).

At 14:52 the two aircraft collided over Yukhnov. The An-12 was on a bearing of 106-121° with a speed of 500–529 km/h (311–329 mph; 270–286 kn); the Il-14 was on a bearing of 235-245° with a speed of 324–360 km/h (201–224 mph; 175–194 kn)h. The aircraft first struck at the wingtips; then the An-12's nose collided with the right horizontal stabilizer of the Il-14. The An-12 lost the right wing and right wing engines from the impact, causing the aircraft to spin to the ground. The Il-14 lost part of the right wing and the upper part of the fuselage. The An-12 crashed in a field near Vypolzovo village, and the Il-14 crashed near Trinity village. The aircraft fell approximately 3,800 m (12,500 ft) apart from each other. All 120 people aboard both aircraft perished.

== Causes ==
The investigation into the crash found that the pilots of the Ilyushin Il-14 disobeyed instructions from air traffic control and climbed to the altitude of 3,000 m (9,800 ft) to avoid the clouds and turbulence, where the formation of Antonov An-12s were flying. The collision occurred at an altitude of 2,910–2,960 m (9,550–9,710 ft), the Il-14 should have been flying at an altitude of 2,700 m (8,900 ft). The pilots of the An-12 were also found to be at fault for flying slightly lower than their assigned altitude of 3,000 m (9,800 ft).

== Memorial ==
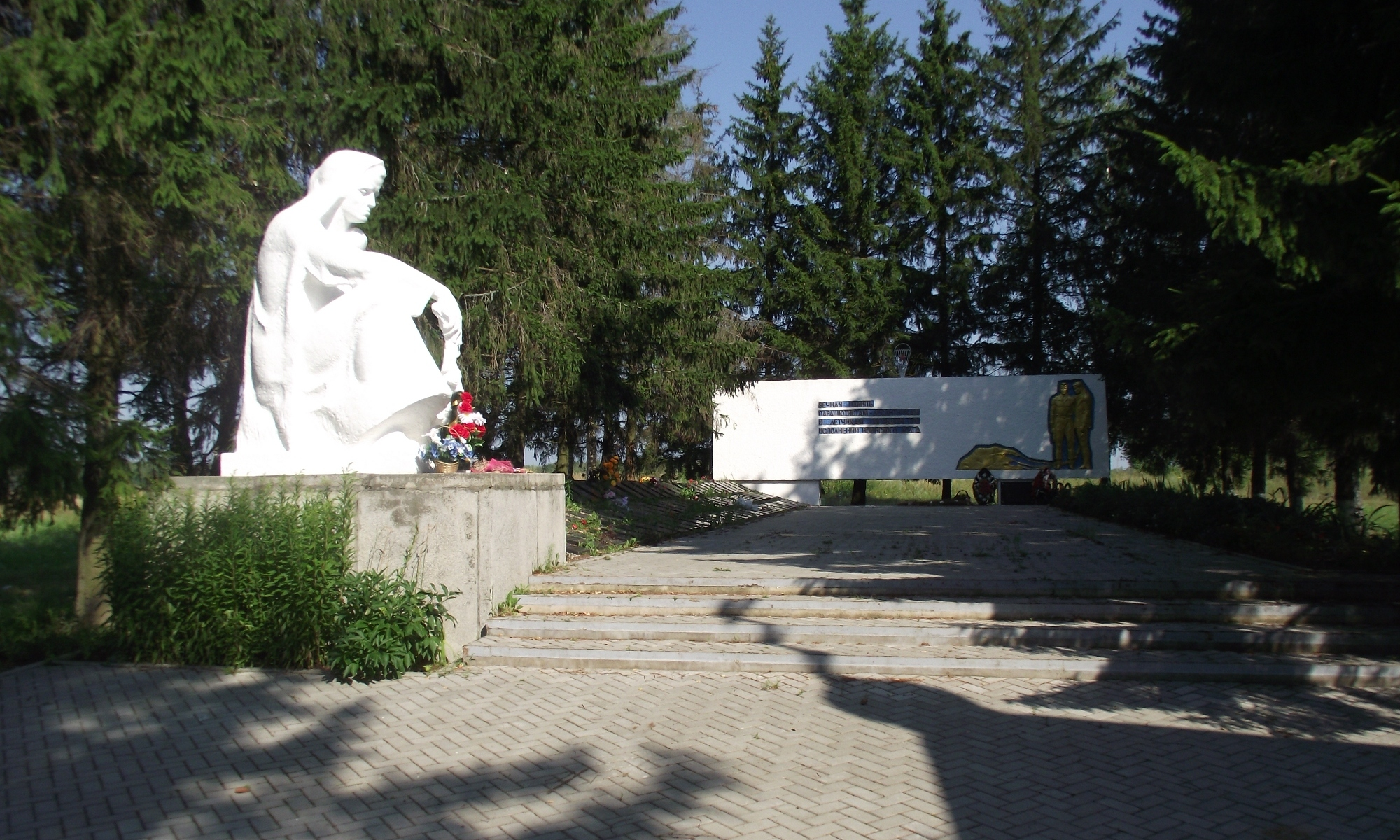
The memorial for the fallen soldiers.

Vasily Margelov, Commander of the Airborne Forces and General of the Army, decided that a memorial would be constructed in memory of the fallen soldiers. Money was raised for the construction of a monument to the dead soldiers. In total, 250 thousand rubles were collected. A year after the disaster, the memorial was constructed at the site the An-12 crashed. The monument, designed by Yevgeny Vuchetich, depicts a kneeling mother and paratrooper and contains the inscription: Eternal memory to the heroes-paratroopers and pilots. Next to the monument is a platform with 96 marble slabs, each with naming a soldier killed in the accident.

At the site of the crashed Ilyushin Il-14 there is a monument to the pilots and passengers.

== See also ==
- 7th Guards Mountain Air Assault Division
