= List of mass shootings in the United States in 2020 =

Mass shootings in the United States in 2020
Mass shootings in Alaska in 2020
Mass shootings in Puerto Rico in 2020
Mass shootings in the United States Virgin Islands in 2020

This is a list of shootings in the United States that have occurred in 2020. Shootings are incidents involving multiple victims of firearm-related violence. The precise inclusion criteria are disputed, and there is no broadly accepted definition.

Gun Violence Archive, a nonprofit research group that tracks shootings and their characteristics in the United States, defines a mass shooting as an incident in which four or more people, excluding the perpetrator(s), are shot in one location at roughly the same time. The Congressional Research Service narrows that definition, limiting it to "public mass shootings", defined by four or more victims killed, excluding any victims who survive. The Washington Post and Mother Jones use similar definitions, with the latter acknowledging that their definition "is a conservative measure of the problem", as many shootings with fewer fatalities occur. The crowdsourced Mass Shooting Tracker project has the most expansive definition of four or more shot in any incident, including the perpetrator in the victim inclusion criteria.

There were 614 mass shootings in 2020 that fit the inclusion criteria of this article, resulting in 446 deaths and 2,515 injuries, for a total of 2,961 victims. Compared to the previous year, there were 180 more incidents. However, according to Statista the number is only 2 for 2020 compared to 10 mass shootings in 2019.

== Definitions ==
- Stanford University MSA Data Project: three or more persons shot in one incident, excluding the perpetrator(s), at one location, at roughly the same time. Excluded are shootings associated with organized crime, gangs or drug wars.
- Mass Shooting Tracker: four or more persons shot in one incident, at one location, at roughly the same time.
- Gun Violence Archive/Vox: four or more shot in one incident, excluding the perpetrators, at one location, at roughly the same time.
- Mother Jones: three or more shot and killed in one incident at a public place, excluding the perpetrators.
- The Washington Post: four or more shot and killed in one incident at a public place, excluding the perpetrators.
- ABC News/FBI: four or more shot and killed in one incident, excluding the perpetrators, at one location, at roughly the same time.
- Congressional Research Service: four or more shot and killed in one incident, excluding the perpetrators, at a public place, excluding gang-related killings and those done with a profit-motive.

Only incidents considered mass shootings by at least two of the above sources are listed below.

== List ==
A number n in brackets indicates that it was the nth mass shooting in that community in the year.

Date	Community	State	Dead	Injured	Total	Description
December 31	Indianapolis (5)	Indiana	1	3	4	A shooting unfolded outside a nightclub on New Year's Eve that killed a man and sent three others to the hospital.
December 31	Happy Valley	Oregon	0	4	4	Four people were wounded after a shooting at a party. All four are expected to survive.
December 27	Smith Bay	United States Virgin Islands	1	3	4	Four men were wounded after a shooting near a restaurant. One of the wounded later died from his injuries.
December 26	Lynn (2)	Massachusetts	1	5	6	Six people were wounded in an evening shooting. One of the victims later died at the hospital.
December 26	Rockford (5)	Illinois	3	3	6	Three people were killed and three others injured in a shooting at a bowling alley. The shooter is believed to have selected his victims at random. A person of interest has been taken into custody by authorities.
December 26	Tampa (5)	Florida	2	2	4	Two men were killed and two injured in an early morning targeted shooting in Ybor City.
December 26	Miami (5)	Florida	1	3	4	Three adults and a juvenile were wounded in an afternoon drive-by shooting. One of the wounded later died at the hospital.
December 25	Boynton Beach (2)	Florida	1	4	5	Four people were injured and one was killed after a shooting on Christmas Day.
December 25	Atkins	Arkansas	5 (Note: Including the perpetrator)	0	5	A woman shot her mother and three young daughters in a murder-suicide.
December 24	Lakeland	Florida	1	4	5	After a teenager got into a conflict with another group, four people were injured and one was killed after a shooting at the teenager's home.
December 22	Meridian	Mississippi	5	0	5	Four individuals were discovered killed in three separate homes after wellness checks were called for them. The perpetrator died of a self inflicted gunshot wound.
December 20	Mayfield	Kentucky	4	0	4	A man killed his wife and two sons before turning the gun on himself.
December 20	Bridgeport (3)	Connecticut	2	2	4	Two men were killed at a sports bar in an apparent targeted shooting. Two innocent bystanders were wounded.
December 19	Chicago (53)	Illinois	0	6	6	Six people were wounded after someone walked into and opened fire inside a South Side beauty salon in the Burnside neighborhood, shortly after midnight. The salon was hosting an after hours party.
December 18	Philadelphia (27)	Pennsylvania	0	4	4	Three men and a woman were shot in the Kingsessing neighborhood. Cocaine and firearms were recovered on the scene.
December 14	St. Louis (11)	Missouri	0	4	4	Following a dispute outside of a restaurant four were people shot.
December 13	Elkview	West Virginia	4	0	4	A family member discovered two parents and two children, aged 12 and 13-years-old, killed in their home. The killer was reportedly a third teenaged child of the family. The shooter was sentenced to life in prison in 2023.
December 12	San Juan	Puerto Rico	1	5	6	A man was killed and five other people injured at a residential complex in the Río Piedras district.
December 12	San Bernardino (2)	California	1	3	4	A man was killed and three others wounded in an early morning shooting.
December 12	Copiague	New York	2	2	4	A man drank at a delicatessen before suddenly opening fire, fatally shooting a customer and the deli owner and wounding two other customers.
December 12	New York City (23)	New York	0	4	4	Four men were wounded in an afternoon shooting in the Boerum Hill neighborhood of Brooklyn.
December 12	Landover	Maryland	1	3	4	A man was killed and three others wounded at a large early morning gathering.
December 10	Tifton	Georgia	0	4	4	Four people were wounded near the Charles Spencer Elementary School during school hours. No students were harmed or in danger.
December 10	Jackson (6)	Mississippi	0	5	5	Five men were wounded in a late night shooting. They were playing dice outside an apartment complex when a man drove up and started shooting. The man chased them through the complex before fleeing.
December 10	Metairie	Louisiana	2	2	4	Two people were killed and two wounded in a parking lot after an SUV pulled into it.
December 8	Williamsburg	West Virginia	6	0	6	2020 Williamsburg massacre: 25-year-old Oreanna Myers shot and killed five children, aged between one and seven, with a shotgun before setting her house on fire and committing suicide.
December 8	Lacombe	Louisiana	2	3	5	A group of four men attempted to rob a home at gun point. The home owner opened fire in defense and killed two of the robbers and wounded the other two. The homeowner's four-year-old child was also wounded.
December 6	Venus	Texas	0	6	6	Six people were wounded at a rodeo outdoor live music venue, with one to two thousand attendees present. Police had been called to the venue three times prior to the shooting, due to fights.
December 5	Hayward	California	1	3	4	Officers responding to reports of a shooting shortly after midnight found a woman dead and three other individuals injured.
December 5	Autryville	North Carolina	0	6	6	Shortly before midnight an argument between two men at a bonfire escalated. Six people were wounded.
December 4	San Lorenzo	Puerto Rico	2	3	5	Two people were killed in a vehicle and three people were wounded in the area.
December 4	Chicago (52)	Illinois	0	4	4	Three men and a seventeen-year-old girl were injured after someone shot at them from across the street. The group was standing outside a home in West Garfield Park.
December 1	Falls Township	Pennsylvania	1	3	4	An eighteen-year-old was killed and three other teenagers were injured after a dispute between two groups escalated.
November 30	Palmer	Alaska	4	0	4	A man was killed, and shortly later a woman and two children; aged 10 and 7-years-old were killed at a home. An additional child was found uninjured in the home.
November 29	Grenada	Mississippi	0	11	11	Eleven people were shot at a motorcycle club. The injured were treated at nearby hospitals and no arrests have been made.
November 29	Memphis (8)	Tennessee	2	2	4	Two people were killed and two wounded in an apartment complex near Memphis International Airport.
November 28	New Orleans (9)	Louisiana	0	4	4	Four people were shot in the evening, in New Orleans East.
November 28	Aiken	South Carolina	1	14	15	A man was killed and fourteen other people were injured shortly after midnight at a nightclub. At least three men fled in a vehicle and continued to fire from the vehicle.
November 27	Macon (2)	Georgia	1	5	6	A woman was killed and five people wounded by gunfire and two stabbed outside a nightclub after an early morning argument.
November 27	Toledo (4)	Ohio	0	6	6	Five people were wounded while leaving a club in the early morning. A sixth person was wounded by a stray bullet while at home.
November 26	Henderson (2)	Nevada	1	5	6	A man, his wife, and his brother fired at motorists and people at a 7-Eleven store, killing one person and wounding four others. The shooters drove to Parker, Arizona, where they fired at other people, not hurting anyone, before being arrested after they crashed their car and one of the suspects was shot by police.
November 22	Trenton	New Jersey	0	4	4	Four people were wounded in an evening shooting in the Stuyvesant area.
November 22	New York City (22)	New York	1	6	7	A woman was killed and six others were injured at a party in the Bedford–Stuyvesant neighborhood of Brooklyn.
November 21	Chicago (51)	Illinois	0	6	6	Six people were wounded in an early morning shooting in Gresham on the South Side after a man opened fire on them from the sidewalk.
November 21	Phoenix (2)	Arizona	1	4	5	A woman was killed and three adults and a teenager were wounded at an illegal warehouse party.
November 21	Bellevue	Nebraska	2	2	4	Two people were killed and two others wounded at a Sonic Drive-In after police responded to a call of a bomb inside a truck. A suspect has been arrested.
November 20	Elberta	Michigan	3	1	4	A family of four, a husband and wife and their two adult sons, were shot in their home. The husband is in critical condition at a local hospital. A recently discharged gun was found at the scene and police do not believe there is a suspect at large.
November 20	Wauwatosa	Wisconsin	0	8	8	Mayfair Mall shooting: Eight people were hospitalized with non-life-threatening injuries after a person opened fire at the Mayfair Mall. Several people, including a 15-year-old boy from Milwaukee, have been arrested in the case.
November 19	Haines City	Florida	1	3	4	One person was killed and three injured in a drive-by shooting while standing under a carport.
November 18	Houston (12)	Texas	3	2	5	A man shot and killed his uncle and cousin and wounded his wife and aunt before committing suicide. His uninjured infant daughter was also in the home.
November 18	Florence	South Carolina	0	4	4	Four people were wounded in an evening shooting.
November 17	Jackson (2)	Tennessee	0	4	4	Four people were wounded at a home that had been the site of a break in back in January 2020.
November 16	Miami (4)	Florida	0	4	4	Two adults and two children under the age of seven were wounded in a drive-by shooting. They were standing outside a home in Golden Glades.
November 16	Chicago (50)	Illinois	0	4	4	Four people were wounded in a drive-by shooting while walking down a road on the West Side. Two of the wounded were teenage girls.
November 16	Chicago (49)	Illinois	0	4	4	Four people were wounded at the Dearborn homes after another group began an argument which escalated.
November 15	Shreveport (3)	Louisiana	0	5	5	Five people were shot shortly after midnight while attending a street gathering.
November 15	Riverdale	Georgia	2	2	4	Two men were killed and two injured at a trailer park in a late night shooting.
November 14	Sumter	South Carolina	3	1 (Note: Including an unborn child)	4	Shortly before midnight, three people were killed and a pregnant woman wounded in a home.
November 14	Fulton	Missouri	0	4	4	Four people were wounded in a late night shooting at an event center. The center had been rented out for a birthday party prior to the shooting.
November 14	Cincinnati (3)	Ohio	0	4	4	Four teenagers, aged between twelve and fifteen, were wounded in an evening drive by shooting in the Winton Hills area.
November 14	Riverside	California	2	3	5	Officers responding to an assault with a deadly weapon call found two men who later died at a hospital. Three additional wounded individuals were identified at a hospital.
November 12	Tampa (4)	Florida	2	4	6	Officers responding to reports of multiple gunshots found two men dead and four wounded in an evening shooting.
November 12	Gastonia (2)	North Carolina	0	6	6	Six people were shot, including two police officers, when an argument inside a nightclub escalated.
November 10	Tampa (3)	Florida	1	7	8	A man was killed and seven other men and teenagers were wounded in a drive-by shooting. A car opened fire on a group gathered at a basketball court next to a Boys & Girls Club.
November 9	Fort Worth (3)	Texas	0	4	4	Two adults and two children were wounded in an afternoon shooting at a local food mart. Police are investigating it as possible gang activity.
November 8	Virginia Beach	Virginia	0	4	4	Two adults and two children under the age of twelve were wounded in a gated apartment complex.
November 8	Nashville (4)	Tennessee	0	8	8	Eight people and a dog were injured in a shooting on Commerce Street in the early hours of the morning.
November 7	Ogden	Kansas	0	4	4	Four men were wounded outside a local bar shortly before midnight.
November 7	Rock Hill (2)	South Carolina	1	3	4	One individual was killed and three injured inside a local bar shortly after midnight.
November 6	New Orleans (8)	Louisiana	2	2	4	Two people were wounded and two killed in the Hollygrove section of the city. One of those killed may have been the target of the shooting.
November 6	Atlanta (10)	Georgia	2	4	6	King Von: After an argument outside a hookah lounge between two groups, multiple people began shooting at each other. Two police officers intervened and engaged the shooters. Rapper Dayvon Bennett (King Von) and another man were killed; four others were wounded. One of the injured was charged with Bennett's murder, but later had his case dismissed.
November 5	Toledo (3)	Ohio	3	1	4	Three people were killed and one injured near an apartment complex. The shooting is believed to be connected to a hit and run accident just down the road.
November 4	Vega Baja	Puerto Rico	0	5	5	Five people were injured after an argument.
November 4	Jefferson City	Missouri	0	4	4	Four people were wounded in a shooting in a parking lot at a local sporting complex and gym located near the Jefferson City High School.
November 3	Henderson (1)	Nevada	4	1	5	Henderson shooting: A man shot and killed three people at an apartment complex before being shot dead by police. A fifth person was taken to a hospital with gunshot wounds but the condition of the person was not yet known.
November 1	Atlantic City	New Jersey	1	3	4	A man was killed and three wounded near a local bar that was hosting a Halloween party in the early morning.
November 1	Hollywood	South Carolina	0	6	6	Six people were wounded in an early morning shooting at a party in an abandoned house.
November 1	Winston-Salem	North Carolina	1	3	4	A man was killed and three others wounded shortly after midnight. A suspect was arrested shortly after.
November 1	Evansville	Indiana	0	4	4	Four people were wounded outside of a bar after an early morning argument escalated in a large crowd. The bar was the scene of a similar shooting in February 2019.
November 1	Oklahoma City (2)	Oklahoma	1	3	4	A man was killed and three others injured after someone fired into an event center.
November 1	Rochester (5)	New York	2	2	4	Two men were killed and two wounded outside an apartment building that was hosting a Halloween party, in the early morning.
November 1	Tucson	Arizona	2	2	4	Two men were killed and two wounded in the desert near Tucson International Airport in the early morning.
October 31	Sacramento (5)	California	0	4	4	Four people were wounded in a drive-by shooting in the Natomas area. Those wounded had gathered at a home there.
October 31	Sumner	Washington	0	5	5	Five people were wounded after an argument escalated outside of a house party, shortly after midnight.
October 31	Anaheim	California	0	4	4	Four people were wounded in an early morning shooting at a strip club. The shooter pulled up outside the club and opened fire.
October 31	College Park	Maryland	0	7	7	Seven people were wounded at a party held in a hotel room at the University of Maryland.
October 31	Las Vegas (2)	Nevada	0	4	4	Four people were shot in a neighborhood, at a believed house party after a dispute escalated. The wounded are believed to be teenagers.
October 30	Waldorf	Maryland	1	3	4	Two groups of men got into a dispute inside a cigar and hookah lounge and the argument escalated. One man was killed and three injured.
October 30	Chicago (48)	Illinois	1	3	4	A man was killed and two adults and a sixteen-year-old were injured after a man entered a home in Morgan Park and opened fire. Police believe the shooting was drug related.
October 29	Winter Garden	Florida	0	4	4	A patrol officer discovered four people wounded after an argument escalated late at night. One of the victims has a concealed weapons permit, but officers are unsure who actually fired.
October 28	Newark (3)	New Jersey	1	3	4	One individual was killed and three others wounded after a heated argument escalated.
October 28	Roanoke	Virginia	0	4	4	Officers responded to a report of multiple shots fired and found four individuals wounded in a home.
October 26	Bessemer	Alabama	1	3	4	An eighteen-year-old was killed and three other teens were wounded in a house during the evening.
October 25	Fort Worth (2)	Texas	2	3	5	A fight broke out at an early morning house party and escalated. Two men were killed and three others wounded.
October 25	San Antonio (7)	Texas	0	4	4	A dispute potentially near I-35 escalated and four people within a car were shot. The car crashed a short time later. Three adults and a thirteen-year-old were wounded and three additional children were not injured.
October 25	Raleigh (2)	North Carolina	1	3	4	Four men were shot in the early morning. Two men were later arrested for the shooting and a wounded man died later at the hospital.
October 24	Anna's Retreat	United States Virgin Islands	1	4	5	A man was killed and four others injured in a shooting at a shopping center.
October 24	Greenwood	Mississippi	2	8	10	A gunman walked into a family's front yard and opened fire on a family gathering shortly before midnight. The family had gathered for a funeral and two were killed and eight wounded.
October 22	Miami (3)	Florida	1	3	4	Shortly before midnight someone opened fire in a Miami neighborhood. A man was killed and two adults and an infant girl were wounded.
October 22	Boston (3)	Massachusetts	0	4	4	Officers responded to a gunfire locator alert and multiple 911 calls and found two individuals wounded. An additional two transported themselves to the hospital.
October 22	Baltimore (10)	Maryland	0	4	4	Three men and a woman were wounded in a shooting shortly after midnight.
October 22	Rayne	Louisiana	0	5	5	A vehicle with six passengers – two adults and four juveniles – was traveling on I-10 when a car next to them opened fire. Five people in the car were wounded.
October 21	New York City (21)	New York	1	5	6	A man was killed and five other people were wounded in a drive-by shooting in Prospect Lefferts Gardens in Brooklyn.
October 21	Canton	Mississippi	1	3	4	A gunman ambushed four people waiting in a car at a McDonald's drive through. One person in the car was killed and two adults and a thirteen-year-old were injured.
October 20	Houston (11)	Texas	3	1	4	An argument at a local open-mic night for rappers at a club escalated when at least two people opened fire. Three men were killed and one injured. One man was given life without parole while another received 25 years in prison.
October 19	Mansfield	Ohio	0	5	5	Five people were wounded in a drive-by-shooting while standing outside a house during a party. A seventeen-year-old and four adults were among the injured.
October 19	New Orleans (7)	Louisiana	1	3	4	A man was killed and three others wounded after gunfire erupted in front of a convenience store.
October 18	Annapolis	Maryland	1	3	4	An argument at an early morning house party escalated and one man was killed. Another adult and two seventeen-year-old girls were wounded.
October 18	Chicago (47)	Illinois	1	4	5	A gunman walked into an East Garfield Park home and opened fire. He killed one man and wounded four others.
October 18	Nashville (3)	Tennessee	0	4	4	Two men were discovered wounded at a home near Belmont University, and two others arrived at local hospitals later.
October 17	Lockport	New York	1	5	6	Shortly after midnight two men approached a home hosting a Halloween themed house party opened fire on the closed garage door. A 21-year-old college student was killed and five others were wounded.
October 17	Rock Hill (1)	South Carolina	0	5	5	A patrol officer heard gunfire near a local lounge in the early morning, and found a wounded man. Four others were transported by private vehicles to local hospitals.
October 16	San Jose (3)	California	2	4	6	Shortly before midnight two men were killed and four injured at a local restaurant.
October 16	Orlando (3)	Florida	3	1	4	Three people were killed and one wounded after an argument occurred in the early morning at a private motorcycle club over a motorcycle. The wounded victim is refusing to cooperate with police.
October 16	Mesa	Arizona	1	6	7	Six people were injured in a drive-by shooting and one was killed. Three of the injured were children and three were adults. The victim killed was one year old.
October 16	San Francisco (2)	California	1	3	4	A man was killed and another man and two women were injured in an evening shooting.
October 15	Mayagüez	Puerto Rico	3	2	5	Three men were killed and two others injured in a shooting.
October 15	Baltimore (9)	Maryland	0	7	7	Seven people were wounded in an evening shooting in Southwest Baltimore. Two people were discovered at the scene and five were later discovered at area hospitals.
October 15	Lafayette (3)	Louisiana	2	2	4	A party after a University of Louisiana football game in Moore Park led to an early morning shooting after an argument escalated. Two people were wounded and two killed.
October 14	Philadelphia (26)	Pennsylvania	0	4	4	Four men were injured at a gas station in an evening shooting in Southwest Philadelphia.
October 12	Myrtle Beach (2)	South Carolina	2	3	5	A man was killed and four others were injured at a local grocery store early in the morning. One of the injured died three days later.
October 11	Atlanta (9)	Georgia	0	4	4	Four people were wounded in an evening shooting at a downtown hotel. Additional guns and pills were discovered at the scene of the shooting.
October 10	Ponce (3)	Puerto Rico	4	2	6	Four people were killed, including one of the shooters, and two others injured during a drug-related shootout at a community center.
October 10	Chicago (46)	Illinois	1	3	4	Four people were inside a vehicle when they were hit by gunfire near the West Garfield Park on the West Side. A man died and two adults and a seventeen-year-old girl were wounded.
October 10	Kingstree	South Carolina	0	8	8	A man opened fire after he was ejected from a nightclub by firing into the club while standing in the road. Three people were discovered in the club and five were taken to the hospital in private vehicles.
October 10	Jennings	Missouri	2	2	4	A woman and her six-year-old daughter were killed and her other daughters aged sixteen and ten-years-old were wounded. The woman's boyfriend was arrested as a person of interest.
October 8	Philadelphia (25)	Pennsylvania	1	6	7	At least two gunmen opened fire on a group of people in the city's Frankford neighborhood. One man was killed and six others wounded.
October 7	Anchorage (2)	Alaska	1	4	5	A man was killed and one man and three women were injured in an early morning shooting at a house party. Two teenagers were arrested and charged for the shooting.
October 7	New York City (20)	New York	1	3	4	One man was killed and three injured in an evening shooting at a Brooklyn building. Neighbors claim that the building was a local gambling den.
October 5	Washington, D.C. (8)	Washington, D.C.	0	4	4	Two men and two women were shot in an evening shooting, with one victim in critical condition.
October 4	Indianapolis (4)	Indiana	3	4	7	Police responding to reports of an early morning shooting found three men dead outside an establishment. Four additional wounded were identified at the hospital after transporting themselves.
October 4	Atlanta (8)	Georgia	1	5	6	A fight broke out between two women inside a store and shortly after three men arrived with guns and entered the store. The men opened fire, and customers returned fire, with one man killed and three adults and two juveniles injured.
October 3	Sacramento (4)	California	1	3	4	A nine-year-old girl was killed and two adults and a six-year-old girl were wounded at a Del Paso Heights park. They were part of a family gathering when a gunman drove up and opened fire.
October 3	Clarksville	Tennessee	0	5	5	At least five people were wounded in an early morning shooting at a house party. An argument had broken out and escalated into gun fire.
October 2	Seattle (2)	Washington	0	4	4	A seventeen-year-old girl and three others were wounded in an evening shooting in Rainier Valley.
October 2	New Orleans (6)	Louisiana	0	4	4	Four people were wounded in a shooting in the Central Business District. Victims ran away from the original scene causing officers to believe there were more shootings than actual.
October 1	Detroit (9)	Michigan	0	5	5	Two women and three men were wounded in a shooting shortly before midnight in a rental hall.
September 30	Greensboro (3)	North Carolina	0	4	4	Four North Carolina A&T State University students were wounded in an off-campus apartment complex.
September 30	Milwaukee (7)	Wisconsin	0	7	7	Seven people were shot at a funeral home.
September 30	Jacksonville (3)	Florida	0	4	4	Two men and two women were wounded inside an apartment with no signs of a break-in.
September 29	Philadelphia (24)	Pennsylvania	0	5	5	Five men were wounded shortly before midnight while standing on a porch in the Logan section of the city.
September 29	Plainsville	Ohio	2	2	4	Two men were killed and two wounded in an afternoon shooting. The men were recording a music video and got into an argument with another group which escalated.
September 28	Detroit (8)	Michigan	0	6	6	Four men and two women were injured in an early morning shooting after a large crowd had congregated outside a Gentleman's club in the city's southwest side.
September 27	Nashville (2)	Tennessee	0	4	4	Four people were wounded near an intersection in the afternoon after an argument escalated. The gunman walked away to his vehicle, retrieved a pistol, opened fire, and drove away.
September 27	Sandusky	Ohio	0	4	4	A man shot and wounded four people shortly before midnight, with one victim discovered in a vehicle by police.
September 27	San Bernardino (1)	California	1	3	4	A nineteen-year-old was killed and three others injured in an evening shooting.
September 26	Philadelphia (23)	Pennsylvania	0	4	4	Two teens, aged fifteen and sixteen-years-old and two adults were wounded just before midnight at a block party in West Philadelphia. The teens and one adult had been leaving the party when the gunman opened fire.
September 26	Enterprise	Alabama	1	3	4	One man died and three others injured after someone opened fire on an early morning party in an apartment complex parking lot.
September 26	Waterloo	Iowa	2	6	8	Two people were killed and six injured in a shooting at a motorcycle club where over 100 people had gathered. Four others suffered injuries from broken glass and debris while fleeing from the gunfire.
September 26	Chicago (45)	Illinois	0	4	4	Two men and two women were injured in an early morning drive-by shooting in Marquette Park on the Southwest Side.
September 25	Philadelphia (22)	Pennsylvania	0	4	4	Four teenagers aged between seventeen and nineteen-years-old were injured in a late night shooting in the Frankford section of the city.
September 23	Hampton	Georgia	1	3	4	A woman was killed and her mother and young child were injured when a man entered the home and shot. He shot and injured an additional woman while carjacking her in an attempt to flee.
September 23	Minneapolis (6)	Minnesota	0	5	5	Three men and two women were injured outside a bar early in the morning after an argument escalated. The bar was the scene of another mass shooting in June were a man died and six were injured.
September 21	Struthers	Ohio	1	4	5	A man barged into a home in the early morning and opened fire, wounding four adults and killing a four-year-old child. The child reportedly was held by his mother when the man opened fire and was struck and killed in her arms.
September 20	New York City (19)	New York	0	4	4	Two women were discovered wounded in front of a house in Queens by police. Two men arrived at the hospital by private vehicles at a later time.
September 20	Stamford	Connecticut	1	3	4	A woman was killed and three others injured in a housing complex parking lot shortly after midnight. A large crowd had gathered and someone opened fire.
September 19	Buffalo (3)	New York	1	4	5	A woman was killed and four other people were injured in an early morning shooting at a street party.
September 19	Rochester (4)	New York	2	14	16	Rochester shooting: Two people were killed and 14 others were injured in Rochester at a backyard party on Pennsylvania Avenue.
September 19	Chicago (44)	Illinois	0	4	4	Four people were wounded in West Pullman less than an hour after the shooting in West Englewood. Two sedans pulled up to a group outside and opened fire towards people on the sidewalk, home porch and inside the home.
September 19	Chicago (43)	Illinois	0	4	4	Four men were wounded in West Englewood while standing outside when someone opened fire.
September 19	Plainfield	New Jersey	0	4	4	Police officers responded to a shooting after a ShotShopper alert and found four people wounded.
September 19	West Memphis	Arkansas	0	5	5	Five people were shot in an evening shooting.
September 18	Little Rock (3)	Arkansas	0	4	4	Four people were wounded in a drive-by afternoon shooting, near I-630.
September 16	Philadelphia (21)	Pennsylvania	2	3	5	Two men were killed and three wounded while playing basketball at the Roberto Clemente Playground in Spring Garden. Police believe the men were targeted as the three shooters chased them down, after the first confrontation.
September 15	San Jose (2)	California	2	3	5	Two people were killed and three others injured in a quintuple shooting near San Jose State University.
September 15	Chicago (42)	Illinois	0	5	5	Five people, including three teenagers, were wounded in a drive by shooting. The group were outside celebrating Mexican Independence.
September 14	Baker	Louisiana	0	4	4	Three people were wounded in a vehicle and a fourth while walking down the street, after a drug deal turned into a robbery. One of the wounded was an eight-year-old girl.
September 14	New Brunswick	New Jersey	2	6	8	Two people died and six others were injured in an overnight shooting near Rutgers University.
September 13	Grand Rapids	Michigan	0	7	7	Seven people were wounded in a late night shooting outside a business in the city's southeast side. One victim's injuries were considered life-threatening.
September 13	Manchester	Tennessee	3	3	6	A man opened fire inside a vehicle on I-24 and killed one person in his vehicle and wounded another. He attempted to carjack three vehicles and wounded two people, before taking two hostages. At the end of the hostage taking a hostage and the gunman were dead and the other hostage released.
September 13	Tampa (2)	Florida	0	4	4	A security guard and three club goers were wounded after an individual opened fire from a car shortly after midnight.
September 13	Chicago (41)	Illinois	1	3	4	A man was killed and two adults and a seventeen-year-old boy were wounded while sitting on a homes porch in Englewood, after two men exited a vehicle and opened fire.
September 12	Chicago (40)	Illinois	2	4	6	A man opened fire at an early morning house party after an argument escalated in the Austin neighborhood. Another individual returned fire causing the first shooter and three others to be wounded and two others killed.
September 12	Wilson	North Carolina	0	5	5	Four adults and a teenager were wounded after a verbal altercation at a house party escalated.
September 11	Donaldson	Louisiana	0	5	5	Five people were wounded at a large party, with one aged sixteen-years-old.
September 10	New Orleans (5)	Louisiana	3	1	4	Four minutes after a shooting, police were alerted to a second in which three men died, and one wounded.
September 9	St. Louis (10)	Missouri	1	3	4	A man was killed and three others wounded in the Wellston neighborhood.
September 8	Baltimore (8)	Maryland	0	5	5	Five people including a seventeen-year-old were injured while playing a dice game when a vehicle pulled up and opened fire.
September 7	New Orleans (4)	Louisiana	0	4	4	Four people including a fourteen-year-old boy were injured in Central City.
September 7	New York City (18)	New York	0	5	5	A fifteen-year-old shooter opened fire at a group of people in a drive-by shooting, including a six-year-old in Brooklyn. Police believe the shooting to be gang related.
September 7	Indianapolis (3)	Indiana	1	4	5	An eighteen-year-old was killed and four others injured after a fight broke out during a party in the Butler-Tarkington neighborhood over a broken table.
September 7	Aguanga	California	7	0	7	A shooting at a large marijuana grow house left seven people dead.
September 7	Chicago (39)	Illinois	1	3	4	An eight-year-old girl was killed and three others injured when another vehicle opened fire on them while they were sitting in another car in the Canaryville neighborhood.
September 6	Chicago (38)	Illinois	0	4	4	Four people were wounded in the South Shore neighborhood in a drive-by shooting. Three adults and a seventeen-year-old were injured.
September 6	Commerce City (2)	Colorado	0	4	4	Four people were wounded at a large house party after a fight broke out in the early morning.
September 6	Memphis (7)	Tennessee	0	4	4	Two people opened fire in an apartment and wounded three adults and a five-year-old child.
September 6	Baltimore (7)	Maryland	0	4	4	Responding officers found a wounded man and three other wounded individuals transported themselves to the hospital.
September 6	Kansas City (4)	Missouri	0	6	6	Six people were wounded in Swope Park where a large crowd had gathered to watch cars do burnouts and donuts.
September 6	St. Louis (9)	Missouri	1	3	4	One woman was killed and three others injured in the Hamilton Heights neighborhood.
September 6	Sparta	Georgia	1	6	7	Responding officers found a man dead and two wounded at an early morning birthday party. Four other wounded were identified at the hospital.
September 6	New Iberia	Louisiana	0	5	5	Five people were wounded at a night club, and separate charges were filed against the club owner for operating during COVID-19 restrictions.
September 5	Houston (10)	Texas	0	4	4	A woman and three men were wounded after a party with multiple motorcycle clubs, had a large fight in the parking lot with multiple shooters.
September 5	Little Rock (2)	Arkansas	0	4	4	A man was found wounded at the River Market district, with witnesses stating the shooter opened fire after pulling a gun from his fanny pack. Three children aged, seventeen, sixteen and twelve-years-old were also wounded.
September 5	Baltimore (6)	Maryland	1	3	4	Two men were discovered wounded by responding officers, one of whom later died at the hospital. Two more wounded were identified after transporting themselves to the hospital.
September 5	Williston	Florida	0	6	6	Six people were wounded in an early morning shooting at a block party/protest that was organized by a man to protest "inequitable narratives."
September 3	Miami (2)	Florida	0	4	4	Four men were wounded in a drive-by shooting shortly before midnight.
September 3	Philadelphia (20)	Pennsylvania	0	6	6	Five men aged eighteen to twenty-six-years-old were found wounded in an east Germantown street shortly before midnight. A sixth man was found wounded in his apartment building from a stray bullet a half-block away.
September 3	Little Rock (1)	Arkansas	0	4	4	Two bystanders including a seventeen-year-old were wounded shortly before midnight at an apartment complex. Two additional wounded were discovered later by police, who stated the shooting occurred after the individuals they had met to purchase guns from, turned on them and opened fire.
September 3	Hensley	Arkansas	1	3	4	A nineteen-year-old was killed and two nineteen-year-old and an eighteen-year-old were injured, when a car pulled up alongside their vehicle and opened fire on I-530.
September 2	Philadelphia (19)	Pennsylvania	2	2	4	Two seventeen-year-olds were killed and a seventeen and eighteen year old wounded in a shooting in Point Breeze.
September 2	Albany (2)	Georgia	1	3	4	One man was killed and two other adults and a sixteen-year-old were wounded while playing cards in an early morning drive-by shooting.
September 2	Oakland (3)	California	0	4	4	Three teenagers, two fifteen-year-olds and a seventeen-year-old, and an adult were wounded in the Brookfield Village neighborhood in East Oakland. Police believe it to be a targeted shooting.
August 31	Tallahassee	Florida	0	4	4	Police responding to a call of several people shot, found two adults and two teenagers aged thirteen and seventeen-years-old wounded in a townhouse complex.
August 30	San Antonio (6)	Texas	2	2	4	A nineteen and seventeen-year-old were killed and two other teenagers were wounded, when a vehicle pulled up to the car that they were in and opened fire. Officers believe at least one person in the vehicle was the intended target.
August 30	Lexington (2)	Kentucky	0	7	7	Seven people were wounded at a community gathering at a local community center. Eyewitnesses were split on how the shooting occurred.
August 30	Buffalo (2)	New York	1	4	5	Five people were wounded in an early morning shooting, with one later dying at a hospital.
August 30	Chicago (37)	Illinois	1	4	5	Five people were shot, one fatally, at a restaurant in Morgan Park.
August 30	Madisonville	Kentucky	0	5	5	Four adults and a fourteen-year-old girl were injured at a block party when an unknown individual opened fire early in the morning.
August 30	Zion	Illinois	0	4	4	A drive by shooting injured three adults standing outside early in the morning. An eight-year-old boy was injured when a bullet entered his bedroom through a wall.
August 29	Las Vegas (1)	Nevada	2	2	4	Shortly before midnight a group was walking down an alley toward a store, when they were approached by three men. One opened fire and killed two of the group and injured two others.
August 29	Rock Island (2)	Illinois	1	5	6	A man was killed and five others injured in an early morning shooting near a local pub.
August 28	Dallas (3)	Texas	0	5	5	Four adults and a fifteen-year-old boy were wounded in a late night shooting in the Deep Ellum district.
August 28	Minneapolis (5)	Minnesota	0	4	4	Four men were wounded by multiple shooters who fled the scene in the car they shot from.
August 27	Portland	Oregon	1	3	4	A sixteen-year-old boy was killed and three other juveniles were wounded in Gateway Discovery Park.
August 26	Pontiac	Michigan	3	1	4	A man engaged in a year-long dispute with neighbors, shot four of them as they sat on his porch. Three died and one was wounded, with the shooter later turning himself in.
August 26	Hilton Head Island	South Carolina	0	4	4	Three men and a woman were injured in a late night shooting, while in a large gathering.
August 26	Philadelphia (18)	Pennsylvania	0	4	4	Three adults and a seventeen-year-old boy were injured in East Germantown in an evening shooting.
August 25	Norfolk (2)	Virginia	0	5	5	Norfolk police said five people were shot on Wednesday night. One of the victims was a 1-month-old child. No suspect information is available at this time.
August 25	Rochester (3)	New York	0	4	4	Four men were wounded in an evening shooting, with two being transported to the hospital in private vehicles.
August 24	Detroit (7)	Michigan	0	4	4	Four men were wounded after a vehicle pulled up and opened fire, with one of the wounded returning fire.
August 24	Sacramento (3)	California	1	3	4	A man was killed and three others wounded, in an early morning shooting.
August 24	West Palm Beach	Florida	0	4	4	Four people were wounded in an evening shooting.
August 24	Richmond (3)	Virginia	1	4	5	A man was killed and four others including a teenage boy were wounded in a night shooting.
August 23	Pine Bluff	Arkansas	0	7	7	Seven people were wounded when gunfire erupted while a large crowd was gathered outside a gas station early in the morning.
August 23	New York City (17)	New York	1	3	4	A man was killed and three others wounded in a housing complex in Brooklyn in the early morning.
August 23	Somerville	Tennessee	1	4	5	A nineteen-year-old man was killed and two men and two women injured in an early morning shooting at a party.
August 23	Champaign	Illinois	0	4	4	Four men were wounded at a party outside an apartment complex when a fight escalated early in the morning.
August 23	Chicago (36)	Illinois	0	4	4	Four men were wounded standing outside a business in the Englewood neighborhood, in an afternoon drive-by shooting.
August 23	Pueblo	Colorado	0	6	6	Early in the morning responding officers found three wounded individuals at a home near Pikes Peak International Raceway. Three more wounded were identified at a local hospital and some of the wounded are teenagers. Officers believe the shooting happened at a house party.
August 22	Rockford (4)	Illinois	1	3	4	Shortly before midnight one man was killed and three others injured.
August 22	Hueytown	Alabama	1	3	4	One person was killed and three wounded after an early morning shooting near the Allison Bonnet Memorial Drive.
August 19	Philadelphia (17)	Pennsylvania	0	4	4	A gun fight wounded two adults and two seventeen-year-olds in West Philadelphia.
August 19	Chicago (35)	Illinois	0	6	6	Five adults and a seventeen-year-old were wounded after a man stepped out of a vehicle and opened fire on a large gathering. The shooting took place in Gresham in the South Side.
August 18	Philadelphia (16)	Pennsylvania	1	4	5	A man was killed and four others wounded including a fifteen-year-old in the Strawberry Mansion neighborhood.
August 18	New York City (16)	New York	0	4	4	A car drove up to a Ravenswood Public Housing building in Queens and opened fire. A seventeen-year-old boy and three adults were wounded.
August 18	Rockford (3)	Illinois	0	4	4	Four people were wounded in the early morning at a large gathering in Twin Sisters Park.
August 17	Louisville (6)	Kentucky	2	2	4	Two people were killed and two people were wounded in a shooting late at night before the car they were in crashed.
August 17	Cleveland (5)	Ohio	0	5	5	Five people were wounded at Dove Park in an evening drive-by shooting.
August 17	New York City (15)	New York	0	4	4	Four men were wounded in an early morning shooting in Brooklyn. The suspected gunman fled in a car after opening fire.
August 17	Dayton	Texas	3	2	5	A man is accused of killing his ex-girlfriend, a man in her home, and a neighbor and wounding two others. He was later arrested after hiding in the surrounding woods.
August 16	San Antonio (5)	Texas	0	5	5	Five people were injured, one critically, in a shooting caused by a dispute at a flea market. A security guard returned fire.
August 16	Cincinnati (2)	Ohio	2	9	11	One person died at the scene and one later at the hospital with nine others wounded in an early morning shooting.
August 16	Lexington (1)	Kentucky	1	3	4	An eighteen-year-old was killed and three others wounded after a disturbance occurred at a large gathering.
August 16	Denver (5)	Colorado	2	5	7	Two men were killed and five others were wounded in a shooting shortly after an earlier shooting.
August 16	Cincinnati (1)	Ohio	1	3	4	Responding officers found a man wounded shortly after midnight, who later died at the hospital. Three others arrived by private vehicles to the hospital.
August 16	Oklahoma City (1)	Oklahoma	0	4	4	Four people were wounded at a large birthday party in the parking lot.
August 15	Philadelphia (15)	Pennsylvania	0	5	5	Four adults and a sixteen-year-old boy were injured shortly before midnight at a large block party when a group on motorcycles arrived and opened fire.
August 15	Rochester (2)	New York	0	5	5	Five people were wounded shortly before midnight.
August 15	Belleville	Michigan	4	0	4	Two men and two women were killed in a home, with one of the women killed identified as the shooter's former fiancée. The shooter boasted about the killings on social media and text messages before being arrested.
August 15	New Haven	Connecticut	1	5	6	One man was killed and five injured after a dice game grew violent shortly before midnight.
August 15	Troy	Alabama	2	3	5	Officers arrived at a large gathering early in the morning to disperse it. While doing so shots were fired in the apartment complex's parking lot. Two men were killed and three others wounded.
August 14	New York City (14)	New York	0	4	4	Three women and one man were wounded late at night on Lenox Avenue in Harlem.
August 12	Dayton (2)	Ohio	1	3	4	A woman was killed and three others wounded in a drive by shooting in the early morning.
August 12	Newark (2)	New Jersey	1	4	5	An eighteen-year-old was killed and four others wounded shortly after midnight.
August 11	Los Angeles (5)	California	0	5	5	Five people were wounded shortly after midnight outside of a warehouse in the Harbor Gateway neighborhood. The shooting occurred after an argument escalated, and an additional person was injured attempting to climb a fence.
August 9	Denver (4)	Colorado	0	10	10	Ten people were injured in a drive-by shooting during a family gathering in a park.
August 9	Toledo (2)	Ohio	0	6	6	Six people were wounded in the early morning after a large gathering turned violent near a shopping center.
August 9	Washington, D.C. (7)	Washington, D.C.	1	21	22	A 17-year-old boy was killed and 21 others injured, including an off-duty police officer, at a party in the southeastern section of the nation's capital. Police are looking for three suspects.
August 9	Jackson (5)	Mississippi	0	4	4	Four people were wounded in the evening, two of the victims drove away and later crashed outside a local bank.
August 9	Houston (9)	Texas	0	4	4	Four men were wounded being a gas station shortly before midnight. The men were playing dice, when a gunman walked up, shot them and fled on foot.
August 8	Paducah	Kentucky	1	4	5	Shortly before midnight a man was killed and four others wounded in the city's north side.
August 8	Philadelphia (14)	Pennsylvania	0	6	6	A pregnant woman, three teenagers and two other women were wounded. They were a part of a large BBQ gathering at a public park.
August 8	Brockton	Massachusetts	0	5	5	Five men were wounded at a house party which was detected by the city's gunshot detection system. Prior a woman from the same party was stabbed.
August 8	Birmingham	Alabama	1	5	6	A man was killed and five people, including an off-duty Birmingham Police officer, were wounded at a motorcycle club in Ensley. The shooting was reported to be due to an altercation escalating, with some of the victims innocent bystanders.
August 8	Albany (2)	New York	1	3	4	An 18-year-old man was killed and a 22-year-old, 28-year-old, and 29-year-old were injured in a drive by shooting involving multiple suspected perpetrators.
August 6	Oakland (2)	California	1	3	4	A man was killed and three others injured while standing outside a house party.
August 5	Chicago (34)	Illinois	0	4	4	An 8-year-old boy and three men were wounded in the North Lawndale neighborhood. The shooter exited a vehicle and opened fire on the group while they were standing on the sidewalk.
August 4	Carolina	Puerto Rico	2	2	4	Two men were killed and two women were injured at a residential complex.
August 4	Madison	Wisconsin	0	4	4	Four people were wounded in Garner Park during a memorial service for a recently deceased individual. Over 300 people were gathered when gunfire broke out and a fifth person was injured fleeing.
August 4	Washington, D.C. (6)	Washington, D.C.	0	4	4	Four men were wounded in an evening shooting.
August 4	Los Angeles (4)	California	1	4	5	A woman was killed and four others were injured at a rented mansion house party. The home was on the famed Mulholland Drive in the Beverly Crest neighborhood.
August 4	St. Louis (8)	Missouri	1	3	4	A woman was killed and two adults and a 17-year-old were injured near the former ABB manufacturing plant. The plant was the scene of a mass shooting in 2010.
August 4	Hartford (2)	Connecticut	1	5	6	A man was killed and five others injured after an early morning shooting at a large gathering at a warehouse.
August 3	New York City (13)	New York	0	4	4	Four people were wounded after a shooter opened fire on a large crowd watching a basketball game at St. Mary's Park in the Bronx.
August 2	Philadelphia (13)	Pennsylvania	0	4	4	Four women were injured with gun fire in the early morning. A fifth woman was stabbed multiple times.
August 2	Newark (1)	New Jersey	0	5	5	Four adults and a 10-year-old child were wounded after multiple heavily armed shooters opened fire on males in a specific block.
August 1	Chicago (33)	Illinois	1	4	5	A man was killed and four others, two men and two women, were injured at a backyard BBQ. Responding officers arrested two men fleeing from the scene.
August 1	Pointblank	Texas	2	3	5	Two men were killed and two adults and an infant were injured. A man entered a home where a child's birthday party was ongoing and opened fire. Two guests returned fire and were among the injured.
August 1	Denver (3)	Colorado	1	4	5	A 16-year-old was killed and three adults and a girl were wounded at a large gathering in the Westwood neighborhood.
August 1	Montgomery (2)	Alabama	0	4	4	Four men were injured after a shooting at an entrance to I-85 South.
July 31	Philadelphia (12)	Pennsylvania	1	3	4	A woman was killed and three men were wounded in an evening shooting.
July 30	Miami Gardens	Florida	0	5	5	Five men were wounded after a potentially gang related shooting occurred behind a U-Gas Station. A witness likened the amount of gunfire to the Iraq war.
July 30	Tampa (1)	Florida	0	5	5	A man opened fire at a gas station while screaming at passersby. He wounded five people before he was arrested.
July 29	Detroit (6)	Michigan	0	4	4	Three men and a woman were injured while standing outside and a person opened fire from a car.
July 29	St. Louis (7)	Missouri	3	1	4	Three men were killed and a third injured after an afternoon dispute escalated between two groups of people.
July 29	Elyria	Ohio	5	0	5	A man killed his wife and three children, aged 12, 10 and 6-years-old, and then himself in an apparent murder-suicide.
July 28	Wilmington (2)	Delaware	2	2	4	A 17-year-old and a woman were killed and two men were injured in a shooting.
July 28	Milwaukee (6)	Wisconsin	0	4	4	Four men were injured in the evening.
July 27	Federal Way	Washington	1	3	4	A 17-year-old was killed and two adults and a 12-year-old injured at Steel Lake Park. A woman reportedly opened fire after an argument.
July 27	Chicago (32)	Illinois	1	4	5	Five people were sitting on a porch in the evening when one was killed and four injured in a drive-by shooting.
July 26	Magnolia	Arkansas	0	4	4	Four people were injured in the early morning after at least two semi-automatic handguns were fired at a large house party.
July 26	Mont Enterprise	Texas	0	4	4	Four people were injured shortly after midnight when someone opened fire during the Rude Boyz Annual Trail Ride. The gathering was held at Durango's Canyon.
July 26	Flint Township	Michigan	1	3	4	One person was killed and three others were injured when two men opened fire in a restaurant. One man was charged with open murder, three counts of assault with intent to murder and multiple weapons charges. The other man was charged with careless discharge of a firearm.
July 26	Commerce City (1)	Colorado	1	3	4	Responding officers to a large gathering in the early morning found a man dead. Three additional victims were transported in private vehicles to the hospital.
July 26	Louisville (5)	Kentucky	1	3	4	Officers responded to I-64 West in the early morning after calls of shots fired by a moving vehicle. They found four individuals shot, with one dead, in a crashed car. A fifth individual was wounded when the car crashed.
July 25	Raleigh (1)	North Carolina	0	4	4	A woman and three men were wounded near a local restaurant.
July 25	Manteca	California	0	7	7	Officers responded from a traffic stop after hearing gunfire. They discovered seven people wounded at a large house party after a man armed with a semi-automatic weapon arrived and opened fire.
July 25	Flint	Michigan	0	6	6	Six people were shot at a party of over 1,000 people following the filming of a music video in a parking lot.
July 25	Miami (1)	Florida	1	3	4	A seven-year-old girl, a sixteen-month boy and two adults were shot by a passing vehicle while getting out of a car. The girl was declared brain dead at the hospital, causing the shooting to be declared a homicide.
July 25	Denver (2)	Colorado	2	3	5	Two men were killed and two women and a man were wounded in the Park Hill neighborhood.
July 25	Dallas (2)	Texas	0	4	4	Three men and a woman were injured shortly before midnight. A man was denied entry at a local bar, retrieved an assault-type weapon from his car, and shot into the building.
July 24	Atlanta (7)	Georgia	2	2	4	Two adults were killed and two teenagers, aged seventeen and eighteen, were injured in an early morning shooting. The group were ambushed by two shooters after arriving at an AirBnb house party in a rideshare.
July 23	Henrico County	Virginia	1	3	4	One man was killed and three others injured in the early morning. Officers are investigating if the individuals were a part of an announced party for that night.
July 23	Petersburg	Virginia	0	4	4	Four people were wounded in an early morning shooting.
July 23	Chicago (31)	Illinois	2	4	6	Two people were killed and four injured while standing on the sidewalk in the West Pullman area of the Far South Side.
July 22	Warren	Michigan	0	4	4	A man opened fire and others returned fire at a large party with at least one hundred people in attendance. Four people were injured in the shooting.
July 21	Chicago (30)	Illinois	0	15	15	Fifteen people were injured, four critically, after a shooter opened fire at people leaving a funeral home in Chicago's Auburn Gresham neighborhood.
July 20	Chicago (29)	Illinois	0	5	5	Five people were wounded in the North Lawndale neighborhood. They were a part of people gathered on the sidewalk when a car pulled up and several men got out and opened fire.
July 20	Richmond (2)	Virginia	1	4	5	One man was killed and four others injured after a fight in a McDonald's parking lot escalated. One of the injured was an innocent bystander in the Food Lion parking lot across the street.
July 19	Peoria (2)	Illinois	0	13	13	Thirteen people were injured in an early morning shooting at a riverfront gathering. An argument between two women led to a man firing two shots into the air. This led to multiple individuals opening fire on the crowd.
July 19	Omaha	Nebraska	0	8	8	Eight people including a fifteen-year-old girl were injured in a drive by shooting early in the morning.
July 19	Chicago (28)	Illinois	2	3	5	Two people were killed and three wounded shortly before midnight in Morgan Park on the Far South Side. They were part of a group of people, that were fired upon by an unknown shooter.
July 19	Washington, D.C. (5)	Washington, D.C.	1	8	9	Police responding to reports of a shooting discovered one man killed and eight other adults wounded.
July 19	Detroit (5)	Michigan	0	4	4	Two fifteen-year-olds and two seventeen-year-olds were wounded while sitting in traffic when another car pulled up and opened fire. Four days later, the suspect was shot by police after a pursuit in which he was found holding a gun and died at a hospital.
July 19	Detroit (4)	Michigan	3	1	4	A man opened fire in a restaurant, killing three men and injuring another. The shooter has been taken into custody.
July 18	Cayey	Puerto Rico	1	3	4	A man was killed and two others wounded in front of a business. An 8-year-old male bystander was also injured.
July 18	Chicago (27)	Illinois	1	4	5	A man was killed and four others wounded after two men opened fire in the early morning in the North Lawndale neighborhood. The men were standing on a street corner.
July 17	Columbus (2)	Ohio	0	4	4	Four adults were wounded while attending a memorial in Weinland Park. A three-year-old girl was also wounded when bullets struck the home she was in.
July 17	Madison	Florida	0	4	4	Three adults and a child were injured after a man, out on bond from a January arrest, entered their home and opened fire.
July 16	Nashville (1)	Tennessee	0	5	5	Eight or nine people opened fire in the early morning in a drive-by shooting. Five people were wounded, including a juvenile.
July 15	New York City (12)	New York	1	5	6	Two gunmen opened fire in the early morning outside a Brooklyn apartment building. A man was killed and five other adults were wounded.
July 15	Shreveport (2)	Louisiana	1	3	4	A man was killed and two adults and an 11-year-old child were injured after an argument escalated from an original argument at a basketball court.
July 14	St. Joseph	Missouri	0	5	5	Five men were injured while standing in a park after a vehicle drove by and opened fire.
July 14	Durham	North Carolina	0	8	8	Six adults and two children aged four and eight-years-old were wounded after someone opened fire at a party outside a home.
July 13	Ponce (2)	Puerto Rico	1	3	4	An 11-year-old boy was killed and his parents and brother injured after a shooter apparently targeting the father fired into a car.
July 13	New York City (11)	New York	0	6	6	Multiple shooters traveled across three different blocks and wounded six people in Brooklyn.
July 13	Louisville (4)	Kentucky	1	3	4	A 16-year-old was killed and three others, including two juveniles, were wounded at a gas station.
July 13	Kent	Washington	0	6	6	Five adults and a teenager were wounded after an argument escalated at a Metro bus stop.
July 12	Como	Mississippi	2	3	5	Two people were killed and three injured at a large outdoor hip hop concert in which potentially five separate guns were used. An additional three people were injured while attempting to flee, after being hit by cars.
July 12	Baton Rouge (3)	Louisiana	1	7	8	A man was killed and seven others injured in an early morning shooting outside an Exxon gas station.
July 12	Lansing	Michigan	0	5	5	Three women and two men were injured after someone opened fire outside an apartment complex. At the complex there was a large party happening with over 100 people present.
July 12	New York City (10)	New York	1	3	4	Two men opened fire on a late night cookout at the Raymond Bush Playground in Brooklyn. Three men were injured and an infant sitting in a stroller was killed.
July 12	Fort Lauderdale (2)	Florida	2	2	4	Two men were killed in an early morning shooting at a party, with two others wounded.
July 12	Chicago (26)	Illinois	1	3	4	A man was killed and two other men and a woman were wounded in Englewood in the evening.
July 12	Chicago (25)	Illinois	1	4	5	Four men were wounded and one killed in an early morning shooting. The group was standing in the street when a verbal altercation escalated with at least two shooters.
July 11	Rochester (1)	New York	0	6	6	Responding officers to an early morning block party arrived to gunfire. Two wounded individuals were identified at the party and four others were identified at local hospitals.
July 11	Wilmington (1)	Delaware	0	5	5	Four teenagers aged between 15 and 13-years-old and 10-year-old child were wounded. Someone opened fire on a playground late at night.
July 8	Caguas	Puerto Rico	0	5	5	Five people, including a teenage girl, were wounded in a drive-by shooting.
July 7	Paterson (2)	New Jersey	4	3	7	In a late night shooting, four people were killed and three injured. Officers suspect the shooting was retaliation by people recently released from prison.
July 7	Alexandria	Virginia	0	5	5	Shortly after midnight an individual stormed an apartment and wounded a man and four teenagers aged 14 to 19-years-old.
July 6	Chicago (24)	Illinois	0	6	6	Shots were fired into a group of people in the Auburn Gresham area on the South Side. The evening shooting wounded six.
July 5	Detroit (3)	Michigan	2	4	6	Two men were killed and four others - two men and two women - were injured in a shooting at a late-night party.
July 5	Houston (8)	Texas	0	4	4	Three men waiting at a stop light and were wounded when someone opened fire. Comedian Rickey Smiley's daughter was a passenger in another vehicle and was also wounded.
July 5	Chicago (23)	Illinois	0	4	4	A 16-year-old girl and three adults were wounded by gunfire while standing in an alley in the West Side's Fifth City neighborhood in the early morning.
July 5	Davenport (2)	Iowa	1	3	4	Officers arrived at an early morning fight and heard shots being fired. They later discovered a man killed by the gunfire and three others injured.
July 5	Greenville	South Carolina	2	8	10	At least two people are killed and eight injured, four critically, at a nightclub. No suspects have been arrested.
July 5	New York City (9)	New York	0	5	5	Four adults and a 15-year-old boy were injured in an early morning shooting in Inwood, Manhattan.
July 5	Helena	Arkansas	1	3	4	A man was killed and three others injured in a parking lot, after leaving an event held by rapper Bankroll Freddie. People were leaving the event when someone fired into the crowd.
July 5	Milwaukee (5)	Wisconsin	0	4	4	Shortly after midnight three men and one woman were injured.
July 5	Cambridge	Maryland	0	4	4	Four people were wounded in an early morning shooting, with potentially multiple weapons used.
July 5	Atlanta (6)	Georgia	2	12	14	A large group of people were watching fireworks, when a fight broke out after a car hit a pedestrian. Fourteen people were wounded, of which two were declared dead at the hospital.
July 5	Chicago (22)	Illinois	1	5	6	A woman was killed and five men were wounded in an early morning drive-by shooting. The group was setting off fireworks when the car approached.
July 5	Ephrata	Pennsylvania	0	4	4	A 20-year-old opened fire on a group of six people after getting into an altercation and taking a rifle from his father. Four of the group were injured and the 20-year-old and his father were arrested.
July 5	Columbia	Missouri	2	3	5	An adult and 11-year-old girl were killed shortly after midnight, three others were wounded. Officers believe that there were two shooters.
July 5	Freeport	Illinois	1	5	6	Shortly after midnight a man was killed and five others were wounded.
July 5	Barnwell County	South Carolina	0	5	5	Five teenagers were wounded shortly after midnight after a shooting occurred at a house party.
July 5	Greenville	Mississippi	0	4	4	A group of people were traveling in a party bus, when someone opened fire on the vehicle. Four people in the bus were wounded.
July 4	Temple Hills	Maryland	1	3	4	Four men were wounded in Marlow Heights, one man later died at the hospital.
July 4	Baton Rouge (2)	Louisiana	0	4	4	Two adults and two children were injured in a drive-by shooting.
July 4	Atlanta (5)	Georgia	0	5	5	A group of people were fired at by an individual in a vehicle, shortly before midnight. Five people were wounded.
July 4	Jackson (4)	Mississippi	1	3	4	An early morning shooting occurred at a nightclub, after an altercation escalated. One person was killed and three others wounded.
July 4	Chicago (21)	Illinois	1	3	4	A man was killed and three others injured in a late night shooting in South Chicago.
July 4	Chicago (20)	Illinois	4	4	8	Four people are killed, and at least four more were injured at an outdoor gathering in Englewood when four men opened fire into a crowd. No suspects have been arrested.
July 4	Lynn (1)	Massachusetts	1	4	5	A man was killed and four others injured at a July 4 cookout.
July 3	Baltimore (5)	Maryland	0	4	4	Four women were injured in a late night shooting in southwest Baltimore.
July 3	Hoover	Alabama	1	3	4	A suspected shootout occurred inside the Riverchase Galleria in the afternoon. An 8-year-old boy was killed and two adults and a girl were injured.
July 2	Delano (2)	California	2	3	5	A group of five were shot after a man got out of a vehicle and opened fire. Two girls were killed aged 11 and 12-years-old and three adults were wounded.
July 2	Somerville	Massachusetts	0	4	4	A man and three women were wounded in a late night shooting, the next day three suspects were arrested.
July 2	Paterson (1)	New Jersey	1	4	5	A man was killed and four others injured shortly after midnight on a street corner.
July 1	Oakland (1)	California	0	4	4	Three men and a woman were wounded in their vehicle on Interstate 580.
June 30	Boston (2)	Massachusetts	1	3	4	Officers responding to a call of shots fired discovered four wounded individuals. A man later died at the hospital.
June 30	Davenport (1)	Iowa	0	5	5	Five men were wounded in an evening shooting. Officers believed the shooting was targeted at the group.
June 30	Atlanta (4)	Georgia	1	4	5	Early in the morning, a group of men sitting on the sidewalk were shot at in a drive-by. One man was killed and four injured.
June 30	Chicago (19)	Illinois	0	4	4	Shortly after midnight three men and a woman were shot while waiting in a vehicle at a Shell gas station in River North neighborhood. The shooter was in a red sedan that they fled in.
June 30	Dayton (1)	Ohio	0	4	4	Three men and one woman were wounded in a shooting.
June 30	Greenbrier	Arkansas	0	4	4	Three adults and one juvenile were wounded, after going to a residence and getting into an altercation. The shooter was a juvenile resident of the home.
June 29	Los Angeles (3)	California	0	4	4	Four men were wounded in a public park in Sylmar in a drive-by shooting.
June 29	Sioux Falls	South Dakota	1	3	4	A man shot and killed another man in a home, after mistaking it as the home of his intended target. He left, entered the intended home, and wounded three others.
June 28	Philadelphia (11)	Pennsylvania	2	2	4	Two men were killed and two injured in a late-night shooting in the Kensington neighborhood.
June 28	Sawyerville	Alabama	0	7	7	During an early morning field party, seven people were wounded after an argument between two men escalated.
June 27	Roselle	Illinois	1	4	5	During a party at a rented house, four people were wounded and one killed when one person, followed by several others, fired handguns; over 60 gunshots were fired.
June 27	Red Bluff	California	2	4	6	Red Bluff shooting. An employee was killed and four injured at a Walmart distribution center. The perpetrator was later killed in a shootout with responding police.
June 27	Peoria (1)	Illinois	0	4	4	Officers responding to an early morning ShotSpotter alert found two men wounded and identified two women who arrived at a hospital to be a part of the incident.
June 27	New York City (8)	New York	0	4	4	Early in the morning a man opened fire at a house party in Brooklyn, injuring four people.
June 27	Chicago (18)	Illinois	1	3	4	A man was killed and three others wounded after a large gathering in Douglas.
June 27	Blytheville	Arkansas	3	1	4	A Missouri man traveled to the area for a house party, where a couple got into a physical domestic fight. Shortly after 911 was called in response to that fight, the man opened fire and killed his Uncle and two others, and wounded another.
June 26	Aurora (2)	Colorado	0	5	5	Five people were wounded by a shooter outside a local grocery store. Officers first thought the incident involved a gunfight among several people, but later announced it was one shooter.
June 26	Fresno	California	0	4	4	Four people were wounded at a house party shortly before midnight, after two shooters appeared near a neighboring home.
June 26	Phoenix (1)	Arizona	0	4	4	Three adults and a 14-year-old boy were wounded in the early morning at a gas station. Prior to the shooting, a large crowd of people and cars had been gathered around the gas station.
June 25	Philadelphia (10)	Pennsylvania	0	4	4	Four men were wounded after a shooting at an intersection in the Kensington neighborhood.
June 25	Bridgeport (2)	Connecticut	1	3	4	A man was killed, and two adults and a 17-year-old injured while attempting to make a rap music video. Officers believed the shooting was targeted, as the victims refused to cooperate.
June 24	Jackson (1)	Tennessee	0	4	4	Three adults and one juvenile were wounded in an early morning shooting. The suspected shooter was arrested.
June 23	Chicago (17)	Illinois	0	4	4	Four people were wounded while standing on a porch in a drive-by shooting in Burnside.
June 23	Lake Worth Beach	Florida	0	5	5	Five people were wounded in a drive-by shooting during the evening. Responding police believed the shooter and victims knew each other.
June 22	San Francisco (1)	California	0	5	5	Police discovered five men wounded by gunfire in the Tenderloin neighborhood.
June 22	Charlotte (2)	North Carolina	4	10	14	During a Juneteenth block party over 100 shots were fired by multiple gunmen into a crowd of approximately 400 people. Four people were killed and 10 others were injured.
June 22	Minneapolis (4)	Minnesota	0	4	4	Officers responding to a shooting on West Broadway Avenue discovered four people injured.
June 22	Minneapolis (3)	Minnesota	0	4	4	Four people were wounded in the Willard-Hay neighborhood during the afternoon.
June 22	Chicago (16)	Illinois	0	5	5	Five people were wounded in a drive-by, including a 16-year-old girl, at an early morning gathering in East Garfield Park.
June 22	Chicago (15)	Illinois	0	4	4	Four people were wounded early in the morning after an individual opened fire from a vehicle in the Back of the Yards neighborhood on the South Side.
June 22	New York City (7)	New York	0	5	5	Five people were shot during a vigil in the Crown Heights area of Brooklyn in the evening.
June 21	Buffalo (1)	New York	0	4	4	Four men were wounded after a shooting at an early morning gathering of cars.
June 21	Austin	Texas	0	5	5	Five people were wounded in an early morning shooting.
June 21	Milwaukee (4)	Wisconsin	1	4	5	Early in the morning there was a shooting at a house party. Five people were wounded; one died in a crash while being taken to hospital.
June 21	Auburn	Alabama	0	4	4	Shortly after midnight, officers attended a home after a complaint of gunshots. They discovered four men wounded.
June 21	Chicago (14)	Illinois	1	3	4	An argument in Humboldt Park escalated shortly after midnight. A man was killed and three wounded.
June 21	Minneapolis (2)	Minnesota	1	11	12	A group of people fired into a crowd, killing one and injuring 11 others.
June 20	Syracuse	New York	0	9	9	Officers arrived at a large party in a public parking lot responding to reports of a stolen car. An individual opened fire as they arrived and injured nine people including a 17-year-old.
June 20	New York City (6)	New York	0	4	4	Three women and a man were injured after a fight broke out between two groups gathered at Claremont park.
June 20	Detroit (2)	Michigan	0	4	4	Four people were wounded in a drive-by shooting in the evening.
June 20	Saginaw (3)	Michigan	1	3	4	A woman sitting in her car was killed and three others injured in another car early in the morning. A shoot-out had occurred in a large gathering nearby.
June 20	Pinetops	North Carolina	2	2	4	Early in the morning two people were killed and two wounded in a shooting.
June 20	Jersey City	New Jersey	1	4	5	One person was killed and four injured shortly after midnight.
June 20	Wichita	Kansas	0	5	5	Five people were shot at a motel after an argument at a party in one of the rooms escalated. Police believe the shooting was intended to be targeted.
June 20	New York City (5)	New York	0	4	4	Four people were wounded at an overnight park party in the Bronx after an argument escalated.
June 20	Janesville	Wisconsin	0	4	4	Officers responding to a shots fired call in the early morning found four people wounded at an adult entertainment venue.
June 18	Albany (1)	New York	0	7	7	Early in the morning a man was discovered by officers with a gunshot wound. Shortly after transporting the man to the hospital, six other victims were identified at local hospitals to be involved in the same shooting.
June 17	Chicago (13)	Illinois	0	4	4	Three adults and a nine-year-old child were wounded while standing in an apartment complex parking lot in the Gresham neighborhood. A man walked up and opened fire on the group, causing a shoot-out.
June 16	Fort Dodge	Iowa	2	2	4	In an apparent shoot-out at a birthday party, one man was killed and two women injured. A second, wounded, man died while attempting to drive away from the scene.
June 15	Decatur (2)	Illinois	0	4	4	An early morning shooting during a block party injured four people. The suspected shooter was arrested after a local traffic stop.
June 15	Chicago (12)	Illinois	0	4	4	A 15-year-old and three adults were gathered outside an apartment when they were injured in a drive-by shooting in the Montclare neighborhood.
June 14	Minneapolis (1)	Minnesota	1	6	7	Early in the morning six people were wounded and one was killed in an incident. Officers were alerted via a ShotSpotter activation.
June 14	Louisville (3)	Kentucky	1	4	5	About 100 people were gathered at a skate park in the early morning when someone opened fire. One person was killed and four injured.
June 14	Lake Charles (2)	Louisiana	0	4	4	Four people were wounded in an early morning shooting at a local night club. A suspected shooter was arrested.
June 14	Lafayette (2)	Louisiana	0	5	5	Officers responded to an early morning shooting and found five people wounded.
June 14	New Orleans (3)	Louisiana	1	3	4	One man was killed and three others injured during the evening.
June 13	Hesperia	California	0	5	5	Over 100 people attended a house party when someone opened fire, injuring five people.
June 13	Rison	Arkansas	0	4	4	Shortly before midnight, four individuals were wounded in a shooting.
June 13	St. Louis (6)	Missouri	1	5	6	Five individuals were wounded and one killed during an early morning shooting in the JeffVanderLou neighborhood.
June 13	Wyandanch	New York	1	7	8	One person was killed and seven others wounded after a shooting at a house party. Local police believe the incident was gang related.
June 13	Atlanta (3)	Georgia	2	5	7	An individual shot at a large group of people from a vehicle, killing two people and wounding five.
June 13	Baltimore (4)	Maryland	0	5	5	Five people were wounded in the Fells Point neighborhood during a large gathering at Broadway Square, with many people drinking alcoholic drinks.
June 13	Washington, D.C. (4)	Washington, D.C.	2	5	7	Shortly before midnight responding officers discovered seven shooting victims. A man and woman later died at hospitals.
June 12	Philadelphia (9)	Pennsylvania	0	6	6	Early in the morning five men and one woman were wounded after multiple men opened fire on a group in the Tioga neighborhood, causing the group to scatter and run away.
June 12	New York City (4)	New York	1	3	4	A 19-year-old woman was killed and a man and a two teenagers wounded at a local park in the Bronx late at night.
June 12	San Antonio (4)	Texas	0	8	8	A man denied entry into a bar for being too drunk, stated "Don't you know who I am?" to the bouncer before leaving. He returned later with a rifle and opened fire injuring five women and three men.
June 11	Richmond (1)	Virginia	0	4	4	Shortly after midnight responding officers discovered two men wounded by gunfire. Another man and a woman were taken to hospital.
June 11	Monroe	Louisiana	6	0	6	A mother killed her neighbor and four children aged 12, 8, 5, and 5 months, then killed herself.
June 11	Washington, D.C. (3)	Washington, D.C.	0	7	7	Seven people including two juveniles were wounded in the Trinidad neighborhood of DC. Officers discovered the victims after hearing gunshots in the early morning.
June 11	Houston (7)	Texas	2	4	6	Two men were killed, and three men and a 13-year-old were wounded in a drive-by shooting while standing in an apartment complex parking lot.
June 10	Sacramento (2)	California	1	3	4	Shortly before midnight, officers discovered three men and one boy wounded by gunfire. One man died later at the hospital.
June 10	Paso Robles	California	2	5	7	A man shot and killed a civilian and wounded an officer. Responding officers killed the suspect; three officers were wounded after a short manhunt.
June 10	Toledo (1)	Ohio	1	3	4	Early in the morning ShotSpotter alerted officers to a graduation party. One 18-year-old was killed and three others wounded.
June 9	Scotland Neck	North Carolina	0	5	5	Four adults and a six-year-old child were wounded in a drive-by shooting at a home and vehicle.
June 9	Vallejo	California	2	3	5	Two women were killed and two adults and a 10-year-old child were injured at a child's birthday party late at night.
June 9	Philadelphia (8)	Pennsylvania	1	6	7	Just before midnight there was a shootout in an apartment complex in the Northern Liberties neighborhood. Six people were wounded and a man was found dead behind some cars near the complex.
June 8	Memphis (6)	Tennessee	0	4	4	A home was first shot at; when police investigated the shooters returned and opened fire. Four people were injured in the second shooting including an 18-month-old infant.
June 8	New York City (3)	New York	0	4	4	A woman, two men and a 17-year-old were wounded after an argument escalated in Brooklyn. The shooter fled the scene.
June 7	Dyersburg	Tennessee	0	5	5	Five people were wounded inside the local American Legion club in the early morning; they all refused to speak with police.
June 7	Chicago (11)	Illinois	1	3	4	Officers responding to a shots-fired call discovered four wounded victims. One victim died in hospital; the other three did not cooperate with investigators.
June 7	Chicago (10)	Illinois	0	6	6	Six men were wounded in a late-night drive by shooting while standing on the sidewalk.
June 7	Sikeston	Missouri	2	7	9	Two women were killed and seven other people wounded at a house party by a drive-by shooting early in the morning.
June 7	Hope	Arkansas	0	6	6	Six people between 15 and 21-years-old were wounded in the early morning during a social gathering.
June 6	Sacramento (1)	California	1	4	5	One person was killed and four were wounded near a house party after an altercation escalated.
June 6	Ironton	Ohio	0	4	4	Four men were injured after a fight between a large number of people escalated in a local bar's parking lot.
June 6	Kansas City (3)	Missouri	1	4	5	An argument escalated in the early morning with at least two individuals opening fire. One man died and four others were wounded.
June 5	Denver (1)	Colorado	0	4	4	Four people were wounded in an early morning shooting. A juvenile was later arrested in connection with the shooting.
June 4	Valhermoso	Alabama	7	0	7	Shortly before midnight authorities responded to a home fire. Seven people killed by gunshots were found after the fire was put out.
June 2	Racine	Wisconsin	0	5	5	Three teenagers and two adults aged between 18 and 20-years-old were wounded at a local beach. Officials do not think there is a connection between it and the protests that occurred that night.
June 2	Dallas (1)	Texas	1	3	4	Four people were wounded after two gunmen opened fire in a bar. A woman later died in hospital.
June 2	Chicago (9)	Illinois	0	4	4	Four males were wounded while standing on the sidewalk when a shooter approached and fired at them.
June 1	St. Louis (5)	Missouri	0	4	4	Four St. Louis police officers were wounded during an altercation with protestors near police headquarters.
May 31	Saginaw (2)	Michigan	0	6	6	Six people were shot when a man opened fire on a block party. The suspect has not been apprehended.
May 31	Philadelphia (7)	Pennsylvania	0	4	4	A 12-year-old and three adults were wounded in a shooting in the Kensington section of the city.
May 31	Gulfport	Mississippi	1	5	6	An 18-year-old was killed and five others injured after someone opened fire early in the morning at a large gathering of people.
May 30	Hiawatha	Iowa	1	3	4	Four people were shot at a mobile home park; one was killed and three hospitalized.
May 30	Altha	Florida	1	5	6	One person was killed and five, including a law enforcement officer, wounded at a birthday party at a local dragstrip.
May 30	Gastonia (1)	North Carolina	1	5	6	Six people were shot, one fatally, in the early morning at a block party after multiple individuals opened fire.
May 30	Houston (6)	Texas	1	4	5	One person was killed and four wounded including two and 12-year-old children, during a block party.
May 29	Portsmouth	Virginia	0	5	5	Five individuals were wounded in a shooting, including a 10-year-old boy. All victims left the scene for hospital via private vehicles, while police were called to the scene.
May 28	Philadelphia (6)	Pennsylvania	1	3	4	Two men approached four people sitting on their porch and opened fire in the evening. A man was killed and two others and a woman were injured.
May 28	Memphis (5)	Tennessee	0	4	4	A road rage incident near I-240 wounded two children and two adults.
May 28	Louisville (2)	Kentucky	0	7	7	Seven people were injured in a shooting during a protest against police brutality in the aftermath of the death of Breonna Taylor, two seriously.
May 27	Boston (1)	Massachusetts	1	4	5	Five men with gunshot wounds were found by police; one died.
May 27	Cleveland (4)	Ohio	1	3	4	Four people were wounded outside of a gas station, in the early morning; one died.
May 27	San Jose (1)	California	0	5	5	A group of five men were wounded outside an apartment complex by a shooter before the individual fled on foot.
May 27	Philadelphia (5)	Pennsylvania	0	4	4	Four men were shot and wounded in a drive-by shooting in the morning, and all taken to the hospital in private vehicles.
May 26	Vicksburg	Mississippi	0	4	4	Shortly after midnight four people aged between 16 and 27 were shot in a Waffle House parking lot.
May 26	Los Angeles (2)	California	0	5	5	Five people were wounded in a shooting outside an apartment complex, ranging in age from mid-teens to early 20s.
May 26	Philadelphia (4)	Pennsylvania	0	4	4	Four people were wounded in a late night shooting.
May 26	Chicago (8)	Illinois	2	2	4	A man selling items on a street corner was shot and killed in a drive-by shooting. A pedestrian was also killed and two others wounded.
May 26	Bowman	South Carolina	3	5	8	A drive-by shooting at a neighborhood cookout in the early morning left three individuals dead and five injured.
May 25	Lake Charles (1)	Louisiana	0	6 (Note: Including at least one of the perpetrators)	6	A 17-year-old shooter and others engaged in a shootout at a graduation party, three 15-year-olds, a 16-year-old, a 17-year-old, and the shooter were injured.
May 24	Jackson (2)	Mississippi	1	4	5	A man was shot and later died at the hospital, while four others, including the suspect, were wounded after a shooting at a private residence.
May 24	St. Louis (4)	Missouri	0	4	4	Four people were shot in the early morning at an intersection.
May 24	Danville	Alabama	3	1	4	Police responding to calls about gunshots found three people dead and one injured at a private residence.
May 24	Myrtle Beach (1)	South Carolina	0	4	4	Four people were wounded shortly after midnight in a what may have been a gang-related shooting. Six people were arrested.
May 23	Washington, D.C. (2)	Washington, D.C.	1	3	4	Officers responding to a shooting found four individuals who were taken to hospital; one died.
May 23	Rock Island (1)	Illinois	1	4	5	A man was killed and four others injured after a fight at a large gathering on a street escalated into a shooting.
May 23	Jonesville	South Carolina	2	5	7	A man and 17-year-old were killed and five others wounded at a block party after the state's quarantine order was lifted.
May 23	Charlotte (1)	North Carolina	0	6	6	Six people were shot in a parking lot after an argument escalated.
May 23	Mount Morris Township	Michigan	1	3	4	A shooting left one dead and three in critical condition.
May 23	Chicago (7)	Illinois	1	3	4	A shooter pulled up outside a home and opened fire on four men standing on the porch. One was killed and three injured.
May 23	Daytona	Florida	0	6	6	Two people were shot and four others wounded by bullet fragments after a shooter opened fire on a crowded beach.
May 23	Fort Lauderdale (1)	Florida	0	5	5	Five men were wounded outside a Jamaican restaurant in the early morning. All were taken to hospital; they refused to cooperate with police.
May 23	Houston (5)	Texas	0	4	4	A fight escalated at a bar, with the perpetrator leaving, driving to the back of the bar, and opening fire, wounding four men.
May 22	Cleveland (3)	Ohio	1	3	4	A man was killed and three other individuals wounded after shots were fired near a local deli in the early morning.
May 20	Houston (4)	Texas	2	3	5	A man shot and killed his pregnant ex-girlfriend and wounded her sister, mother, and boyfriend, then committed suicide after being surrounding by police.
May 19	Decatur (1)	Illinois	0	5	5	Five men were wounded shortly after midnight.
May 18	Bakersfield (2)	California	0	5	5	Five teenagers, aged 18 and 17-years-old, were wounded after a man fired into the apartment from outside the complex.
May 17	Charleston	South Carolina	0	4	4	Three people were wounded when an individual opened fire at a party that was hosted at a short-term rental. A woman walking her dog near the home was also wounded.
May 17	District Heights	Maryland	1	3	4	Police responded to a shooting and found an 18-year-old dead on the sidewalk. Three injured victims were identified later.
May 17	St. Matthews	South Carolina	4	1	5	A mother and her 15- and 12-year-old daughters were shot and killed by her husband, who wounded another daughter before killing himself. Another daughter was uninjured and ran for help.
May 16	Bogalusa	Louisiana	0	13	13	Hundreds of people had gathered for a memorial service when multiple shooters began firing, wounding thirteen people.
May 14	Albuquerque (3)	New Mexico	0	5	5	Police responding to a call of shots fired discovered five individuals, including a pregnant woman, wounded after an argument had escalated.
May 13	Rockford (2)	Illinois	1	4	5	One person was killed and four injured in a believed targeted shooting at a gas station.
May 13	Garrison	Kentucky	1	4	5	Six people were involved in the repossession of a vehicle; one opened fire killing one and injuring four.
May 11	Montgomery (1)	Alabama	0	4	4	Police responding to a call about a gunshot victim discovered one victim; three others were taken to hospital by car.
May 10	Katy	Texas	0	6	6	A dispute between two neighbors escalated causing five people, including a five-year-old girl, to be wounded.
May 10	Baton Rouge (1)	Louisiana	0	5	5	Multiple gunmen were involved in a shootout at a local food market, wounding five including a minor.
May 10	Fort Worth (1)	Texas	0	5	5	Five people were wounded in a public park where hundreds were gathered. Some thought the gunfire was fireworks.
May 9	St. Louis (3)	Missouri	0	4	4	Four people were wounded during a late night shooting.
May 7	Baltimore (3)	Maryland	0	4	4	Four men were discovered shot on the city's west side in the evening.
May 6	Memphis (4)	Tennessee	2	2	4	Two men were shot and killed in a vehicle; two others were wounded after attempting to exit the vehicle and being shot at in a drive-by.
May 6	Albany (1)	Georgia	1	3	4	A 16-year-old was killed and three others wounded in a vehicle after the car was shot at multiple times in the early morning.
May 5	Hammond	Indiana	1	3	4	A man was killed and three others wounded after an incident of road rage escalated.
May 3	Columbus (1)	Ohio	0	4	4	Four people were wounded after an individual opened fire at a house party.
May 3	Jacksonville (2)	Florida	0	4	4	A man drove up to a street and after exiting the car fired at least 30 shots into a crowd of people, wounding four men.
May 3	Chicago (6)	Illinois	0	5	5	Five teenagers aged 15 through 19 years old were injured in a drive-by shooting after attending a large gathering.
May 2	Philadelphia (3)	Pennsylvania	0	4	4	A man and three women were injured in a shooting in the evening.
April 29	Indianapolis (2)	Indiana	0	4	4	Four people were wounded in a shooting that involved two vehicles and an additional four people near Perry Park.
April 27	Milwaukee (3)	Wisconsin	5	0	5	Five people, aged between 14 and 41, were killed in a home, with a child being uninjured in the violence. Police treated the incident as domestic violence. The shooter was sentenced to 205 years in prison in 2021.
April 26	Salisbury (2)	North Carolina	1	4	5	One individual was killed and four others, including a juvenile, were injured after a fight escalated into a shooting.
April 26	Troy	New York	0	4	4	Four people were wounded in the city's South End in an early morning shooting.
April 25	Joliet	Illinois	1	3	4	One person was killed and three others, one 17 years old, wounded in an early morning shooting.
April 25	Memphis (3)	Tennessee	0	7	7	Seven people were discovered wounded after police responded to an aggravated assault call. They were wounded in a drive-by shooting after heading to an early morning party.
April 25	Orlando (2)	Florida	1	4	5	An 18-year-old athlete who was to play at the University of Louisville was killed and four others injured in a late night shooting.
April 24	Fort Wayne	Indiana	0	4	4	Police responding to a shots-fired call found four people injured.
April 24	Houston (3)	Texas	3	1	4	Three people were killed and one injured in an apartment by two shooters. Due to the lack of forced entry it is thought that the victims may have known the shooters.
April 18	Hyattsville	Maryland	2	2	4	Two men were killed and two injured in a late-night shooting.
April 17	Springfield	Massachusetts	1	4	5	One man was killed and four others injured after multiple individuals opened fire on a backyard gathering before fleeing in a car and continuing to fire.
April 17	Greensboro (2)	North Carolina	1	3	4	Responding police discovered three adults and a juvenile injured by a shooting. An adult later died in the hospital.
April 15	Jackson (1)	Mississippi	1	3	4	A five-year-old girl was killed and three adults wounded after someone shot into an apartment.
April 11	Bakersfield (1)	California	0	6	6	One juvenile and five adults were wounded when a large party at an apartment complex was fired upon by at least four shooters.
April 10	Muskegon	Michigan	0	4	4	Police were alerted about shots fired shortly after midnight, and arrived to find the suspect had fled and the four wounded had taken themselves to hospital.
April 8	Detroit (1)	Michigan	0	4	4	One man and three women were injured after an altercation escalated. A male shooter escaped the scene, and a female was arrested for pointing a weapon at one of the wounded.
April 8	Anchorage (1)	Alaska	0	4	4	Police responding to a call of shots fired found one person wounded. An additional three connected to the shooting were found in local hospitals.
April 8	Greenwood	South Carolina	1	3	4	A 19-year-old was killed and three others individuals were wounded at an apartment complex.
April 7	Chicago (5)	Illinois	1	3	4	One man was killed and three other people wounded, including a 5-year-old, after an individual came out of an alley and fired on the group. One of the group likely returned fire at the shooter.
April 5	New York City (2)	New York	0	4	4	Four men were wounded in an early morning shooting in a Brooklyn apartment.
April 5	Lancaster	South Carolina	1	4	5	One man was killed and four other individuals were wounded in a drive-by shooting in which people standing outside a house and sitting in a car were fired upon.
April 5	Los Angeles (1)	California	1	3	4	One man was killed and two other men and one woman were injured in an afternoon shooting.
April 4	Vidor	Texas	0	4	4	Police officers responding to a shots-fired call found four wounded individuals, with the shooter arrested later.
April 4	Lubbock	Texas	2	2	4	Police responding to a shots fired call found a dead man and teenaged girl, and two seriously wounded individuals.
April 4	Hialeah	Florida	1	4	5	A man shot and wounded his ex-girlfriend's relatives before barricading himself with her and their 9-year-old child in the home. During the stand-off an officer and the ex-girlfriend were wounded, and the man was killed by police.
April 3	Louisville (1)	Kentucky	0	4	4	Police responding to calls about a shooting discovered two people wounded; two other wounded people drove themselves to the hospital.
March 31	Macon (1)	Georgia	3	1	4	A domestic argument escalated, and a man shot and killed his child's mother, step-father, and sister before abducting his two-year-old child. The shooter was arrested and the child recovered after an Amber Alert was issued.
March 30	Philadelphia (2)	Pennsylvania	0	5	5	Five people were wounded at a late night memorial gathering after a man fired into the crowd from half-a-block away. The wounded included a two-year-old, a fourteen-year-old, and an eighteen-year-old.
March 29	Atlanta (2)	Georgia	0	4	4	Four people were wounded in a late-night shooting, with two of the wounded under the age of 18. One of the wounded was showing signs of COVID-19.
March 28	Baltimore (2)	Maryland	1	3	4	One man was killed and two others and a teenager wounded in a drive-by shooting by three shooters.
March 23	San Antonio (3)	Texas	0	4	4	Four people in a car were wounded by a shooter in the early morning. Three of the victims took themselves to hospitals before police arrived. The victim found by officers knew who had shot him, but refused to cooperate with police questions.
March 22	Hanahan	South Carolina	0	4	4	Four people were injured in an early morning shooting.
March 20	Norfolk (1)	Virginia	0	4	4	Four people were discovered to be wounded in a shooting after police received a report about a shooting.
March 20	St. Louis (2)	Missouri	0	4	4	Three men and a woman were shot and wounded leaving a bar early in the morning. A second woman was injured by the crowd fleeing the scene.
March 18	Jacksonville (1)	Florida	1	4	5	Five people were shot by a man wearing all-black and possibly a face mask; one died at the scene. One of the wounded is a three-year-old child.
March 17	Baltimore (1)	Maryland	0	7	7	Police reported that seven civilians were injured during a police-involved shooting.
March 15	Springfield	Missouri	5	2	7	2020 Springfield, Missouri shooting: A shooter killed four people, including a police officer, and injured two others, including another police officer, before committing suicide at a gas station.
March 15	Moncure	North Carolina	7	0	7	Seven adult members of the same family were killed in an apparent murder suicide and were discovered after reports of shots fired.
March 14	Saginaw (1)	Michigan	2	2	4	Police responding to a shooting found three women and one man injured; two women died.
March 14	Albuquerque (2)	New Mexico	1	3	4	Reportedly a group of young men burst into a home and started shooting early in the morning. They wounded a woman, a 16-year-old girl and a 17-year-old girl and killed a man.
March 13	New Orleans (2)	Louisiana	0	5	5	Four men riding in a vehicle shot and wounded five people, including a 15-year-old boy, in a drive-by shooting, in the Algiers neighborhood.
March 13	Rockford (1)	Illinois	0	4	4	Three men and one woman were wounded after another man opened fire inside of an apartment. The man was later arrested by police.
March 10	Chester	Pennsylvania	2	2	4	Police responding to a shooting discovered two 15-year-old boys killed and a third juvenile injured. A fourth wounded juvenile involved in the shooting was later identified at a medical center.
March 8	Ceres	California	1	3	4	Police responded to reports of a shooting and discovered three wounded individuals, one of whom later died. A fourth victim arrived at a hospital in a private vehicle.
March 8	Milwaukee (2)	Wisconsin	1	3	4	An early morning argument escalated and resulted in one man killed and three injured outside a local business.
March 8	South Holland	Illinois	0	4	4	Four men were wounded in a vehicle on Bishop Ford Freeway, after another vehicle's occupant(s) fired on them.
March 8	Rosedale	Maryland	1	5	6	A 13-year-old boy was killed, five others were wounded; a 14-year-old boy and girl, two 12-year-old boys and a 19-year-old man were wounded. The group was shot at in a parking lot after an altercation while attending a Triple Threat Elite Dance event.
March 7	Cleveland (2)	Ohio	1	17	18	Seventeen people were wounded and one killed after a shootout between multiple motorcycle clubs after a fight at one of the club's headquarters caused many to be thrown out.
March 7	Albuquerque (1)	New Mexico	0	4	4	Three adults and one child were injured by a shooter while leaving a house party. The shooter was later arrested.
March 7	Chicago (4)	Illinois	0	7	7	Six men and a woman were injured in a drive-by shooting after leaving a house party after a fight broke out in the Greater Grand Crossing neighborhood.
March 6	Washington, D.C. (1)	Washington, D.C.	0	6	6	Four males, one female and a five-year-old child were discovered by police wounded in a drive-by shooting.
March 4	Tulare	California	1	5	6	One was killed while five others were injured at a mass shooting during a celebration of life.
February 29	Kansas City (2)	Missouri	1	4	5	Four people were injured and one person was fatally wounded at a shooting.
February 29	Brighton	Colorado	0	5	5	Five people were wounded in a drive by shooting, before the perpetrators fled.
February 26	Milwaukee (1)	Wisconsin	6	0	6	Milwaukee brewery shooting: Five people were killed when a gunman opened fire at the local Molson Coors Beverage Company campus, where he had been employed, then committed suicide.
February 25	Chicago (3)	Illinois	1	4	5	In a shooting at a convenience store in the Avalon Park neighborhood four people were hurt and one person was killed. The four wounded victims were listed in serious-to-critical condition. It was reported that three people, including two men and a woman, exited a vehicle and started firing inside the store. They fled in a white vehicle after the arrival of police.
February 25	Lafayette (1)	Louisiana	0	6	6	Six people were injured in a shooting at a business.
February 23	Houston (2)	Texas	0	7	7	Seven people were shot and wounded, not critically, at a flea market where a dance event with adults and children was taking place. A suspect was arrested and charged with assault.
February 23	Clarkton	North Carolina	3	1	4	Three people were killed and one person was injured in a shooting. A suspect turned himself in to local authorities and was charged with three counts of murder and one count of attempted murder.
February 20	Caldwell	Idaho	2	3	5	Two people were fatally shot and three others, including a police officer, were wounded in a shooting at an apartment complex. The suspect was among the dead.
February 20	Greensboro (1)	North Carolina	0	4	4	Four men were sent to a hospital after police said there were wounded in a shooting in the street.
February 20	Orlando (1)	Florida	4	0	4	A man killed his wife and two children before killing himself.
February 19	Philadelphia (1)	Pennsylvania	0	4	4	There was a shooting in the North Side of the city where four people were injured, two critically. A suspect was arrested.
February 17	Port Gibson	Mississippi	2	2	4	Four students of Alcorn State University were involved in a shooting off campus; two were killed and two injured.
February 16	Pensacola	Florida	1	4	5	One person was killed and four others injured, two seriously, in a drive-by shooting.
February 16	Midland	Texas	1	3	4	A shooting occurred at a bar where one victim was killed and three others were wounded.
February 16	Hartford (1)	Connecticut	1	4	5	One person was killed and four others were wounded in a shooting at a nightclub.
February 15	New Orleans (1)	Louisiana	0	4	4	Four people, two men and two women, were wounded in a shooting blocks away from the city's Mardi Gras Parade route.
February 15	Memphis (2)	Tennessee	0	7	7	Seven people were wounded when an unknown shooter opened fire at a street race after an argument escalated.
February 14	Chicago (2)	Illinois	0	6	6	Three adults and three children were wounded in a shooting at a gathering in an apartment complex in the South Side of the city.
February 10	Dover	Delaware	1	4	5	One person was fatally shot and four others were wounded in a shooting.
February 9	San Antonio (2)	Texas	0	4	4	A heated argument turned violent between a man and a woman in front of a house which led to a shooting. Four people were injured, three seriously, and taken to hospital. Two of the injured were charged afterwards.
February 9	Youngstown	Ohio	3	2	5	Three people were killed and two others were injured in a shooting at a club. One of the victims was found dead inside a car. At least one suspect was arrested.
February 8	Houston (1)	Texas	1	3	4	A 29-year-old rap artist was killed and three others were wounded in a shooting in North Houston. The suspects were thought to be gang members.
February 7	Waco	Texas	1	3	4	One man was killed and three others wounded, two critically, in a shooting outside and inside a home in Waco. Police believe that the shooting was due to a sale of illicit drugs gone wrong.
February 5	Indianapolis (1)	Indiana	4	0	4	Three males and a female were fatally shot on the Northeast section of the city.
February 3	Washington County	Maine	3	1	4	Three people were killed and another was injured in the towns of Machias and Jonesboro. A 63-year-old man was charged with the crime.
February 3	Grapevine	California	1	5	6	One person was killed and five others were injured from a shooting on a Greyhound bus heading from Los Angeles to San Francisco. The bus was traversing Tejon Pass on Interstate 5, near Lebec, California, and stopped in Grapevine after the shooting.
February 1	Philadelphia	Mississippi	0	4	4	Police responded to a street location where multiple shots were fired. They found four victims, aged 18–45 years old, with bullet wounds. Three of the victims were transported by helicopter to a hospital.
February 1	Union Parish	Louisiana	4	0	4	A shooter shot and killed two members of a family and a friend of one of them inside a house. A third fled through a window uninjured and alerted the authorities. The shooter then committed suicide.
January 31	Delano (1)	California	1	4	5	One person was killed and four others injured, one critically, in a shooting incident that occurred in several locations. The shooting happened during a memorial gathering for a victim who was killed in a traffic accident.
January 31	Boynton Beach (1)	Florida	1	3	4	A shooting left one victim dead and the other three injured in the 200 block of Northeast First Court.
January 31	Shreveport (1)	Louisiana	0	4	4	A shooting occurred at an apartment complex where four teens were injured. All four victims, aged 15–17 years old, suffered non-life-threatening injuries.
January 30	Merced	California	0	4	4	Four teenagers were injured, one critically, in a shooting on public streets.
January 27	Bridgeport (1)	Connecticut	0	4	4	Four men were wounded outside the Golden Hill Street Courthouse while sitting in a car, in a drive-by shooting by multiple shooters.
January 26	Newburgh	New York	3	1	4	Four family members were shot at a home. Three of the victims were killed; a child, was seriously wounded. The suspect was apprehended and arrested by the police.
January 26	Cape Girardeau	Missouri	0	5	5	Multiple shots were fired inside a business where five people were wounded in a shooting.
January 26	Salisbury (1)	North Carolina	0	6	6	Six people were injured by a shooting shortly after midnight, at a local restaurant. An additional three others were treated for non-gunfire related injuries.
January 26	Hartsville	South Carolina	3	6	9	Three people were fatally shot and four others were injured at a bar.
January 24	Vanceboro	North Carolina	5	0	5	A man shot and killed his wife and three children, aged between eight months and four years old, and the family dog. He then killed himself.
January 24	Lisle	Illinois	2	2	4	A woman killed one Illinois State Trooper and injured two others before killing herself at a cigar lounge.
January 22	Seattle (1)	Washington	1	7	8	Eight people were shot, one fatally, outside a McDonald's restaurant on Pine Street in Downtown Seattle.
January 19	Kansas City (1)	Missouri	2	15	17	Two people (including the perpetrator) were killed and fifteen others were injured during a shooting at a nightclub.
January 19	South Houston	Texas	2	2	4	Police discovered two people dead and two injured after responding to a shooting.
January 19	Memphis (1)	Tennessee	1	4	5	One person was killed and four others were injured during a shooting outside a nightclub.
January 19	San Antonio (1)	Texas	2	5	7	Two people were killed and five others injured at a nightclub.
January 17	Grantsville	Utah	4	1	5	Haynie family shooting: Four people were killed and one was injured after a teenager allegedly fired at his family at their house. He was charged with four counts of aggravated murder, one count of attempted aggravated murder and five counts of illegal discharge of a firearm.
January 16	Chicago (1)	Illinois	0	5	5	Three children between 11 and 16 years old were injured along with two adults after two perpetrators fired into a barber shop in the East Garfield Park neighborhood.
January 15	Des Moines	Iowa	2	2	4	Two people were killed and two injured after a shooting in a home's detached garage.
January 11	Aurora (1)	Colorado	0	5	5	Five people, including three teenagers, were wounded by a 16-year-old shooter at an apartment building.
January 8	Bay Saint Louis	Mississippi	2	2	4	Two people were killed and two injured in a random ambush style shooting. The perpetrator was arrested after arriving at his mother's house covered in blood.
January 5	Atlanta (1)	Georgia	0	4	4	Four people were injured by a single person after an argument near a northwestern Atlanta nightclub early in the morning.
January 4	Ocala	Florida	1	3	4	One man was killed and three men were injured in a mid-morning shooting.
January 2	New York City (1)	New York	0	4	4	Four people were wounded in a drive-by shooting outside an apartment building in the Sunset Park neighborhood.
January 1	Ponce (1)	Puerto Rico	2	2	4	After an argument outside a business, a shooter killed two men and injured two bystanders.
January 1	St. Louis (1)	Missouri	3	1	4	Responding police discovered three people dead and one wounded at an early morning shooting in the Benton Park neighborhood.
January 1	Cleveland (1)	Ohio	0	4	4	An argument in a Downtown Cleveland night club's VIP section led to three people being wounded; a fourth person was shot in the head in the back alley.
January 1	Huntington	West Virginia	0	7	7	Seven people were wounded inside and outside a hookah bar early in the morning, after an argument escalated.
January 1	Trujillo Alto	Puerto Rico	4	1	5	A family of four, including nine-year-old twin boys, were shot and killed at their home after celebrating New Year's Eve. A 16-year-old boy was seriously injured.

== Monthly statistics ==
2020 US mass shooting statistics by month
Month	Mass Shootings	Total number killed	Total number wounded	Occurred at a school or university	Occurred at a place of worship
January	28	39	111	1	0
February	28	40	94	1	0
March	26	27	112	0	0
April	26	23	92	0	0
May	58	37	248	0	0
June	91	62	395	0	0
July	87	71	383	0	0
August	78	51	340	0	0
September	65	44	274	0	0
October	52	41	210	1	0
November	47	47	192	0	0
December	29	39	94	0	0
Total	615	521	2,541	3	0

The statistics columns for each month are updated after the month ends, in an effort to make sure the correct number of events, individuals affected, and descriptions are accurate. Thus, the number may be incomplete throughout the month until the last day of each month.

== See also ==
- List of school shootings in the United States (before 2000)
- List of school shootings in the United States (2000–present)
- List of school shootings in the United States by death toll
- Casualty recording
- List of countries by firearm-related death rate
- List of countries by intentional homicide rate
- Percent of households with guns by country
- Estimated number of civilian guns per capita by country
