= List of killings by law enforcement officers in the United States, November 2020 =

This is a list of people reported killed by non-military law enforcement officers in the United States in November 2020, whether in the line of duty or not, and regardless of reason or method. The listing documents the occurrence of a death, making no implications regarding wrongdoing or justification on the part of the person killed or officer involved. Killings are arranged by date of the incident that caused death. Different death dates, if known, are noted in the description. The table below lists 95 people.

== November 2020 ==
Date	Name (age) of deceased	Race	State (city)	Description
2020-11-30	Ekom Udofia (33)	Black	Arizona (Phoenix)	Police say Udofia, a former NFL player, was armed with a gun and was trying to be hit by passing cars. After pointing the gun at an officer Udofia was shot. The gun was later revealed to be a BB gun.
2020-11-30	Mickee McArthur (28)	Black	Ferry Pass, FL	
2020-11-29	Adam Lee Mendez (38)	Hispanic	San Angelo, TX	
2020-11-29	Alonzo Leroy Landy (32)	Unknown race	Fayetteville, GA	
2020-11-29	Cory Donell Truxillo (43)	Black	Houma, LA	
2020-11-27	Nicolas Segura (27)	Hispanic	San Bernardino, CA	
2020-11-27	Name Withheld	Unknown race	Wilsonville, OR	
2020-11-27	Michael Anthony Pena (31)	Hispanic	Lubbock, TX	
2020-11-27	Duane W. Rich (74)	White	Amberg, WI	
2020-11-26	Ellis Frye Jr. (62)	Black	Culpeper, VA	
2020-11-25	Martin Pacheco (34)	Hispanic/Latino	Folsom, California	Pacheco, an inmate at California State Prison, Sacramento, was shot and killed by a guard as he and two other prisoners allegedly assaulted another inmate.
2020-11-25	Joshua Lee LaPlace (30)	White	San Antonio, TX	
2020-11-24	Rondell Goppy (41)	Black	New York (New York City)	Goppy opened fire on two police officers in Queens, injuring both of them. The officers then fired back and killed Goppy. Earlier, Goppy's wife had gone to report domestic violence. The officers are in stable condition and are expected to recover.
2020-11-24	Lorenzo Aguilar (37)	Hispanic	Deming, NM	
2020-11-24	George Howard Sands (53)	Native Hawaiian or Pacific Islander	Durango, CO	
2020-11-23	Stavian Rodriguez (15)	Hispanic/Latino	Oklahoma (Oklahoma City)	Rodriguez was suspected in an armed robbery in Oklahoma City. When police arrived he dropped a gun and put his hands in the air. He was shot by police after lowering his hands.
2020-11-23	Anthony Arias (29)	Hispanic	Miami, FL	
2020-11-22	Brian Allen Thurman (49)	White	Kentucky (Portland)	Thurman was stopped at a traffic stop, after the vehicle he was riding in was reported as being stolen. He was shot after an altercation took place, and there is no body camera footage.
2020-11-22	Name Withheld	Unknown race	Beaumont, CA	
2020-11-22	Brittany Nicole Yoder (34)	White	Ohatchee, AL	
2020-11-22	Randy LaCoursiere	White	Eau Claire, WI	
2020-11-22	Nicholas Cory Kausshen (41)	Unknown race	Spokane Valley, WA	
2020-11-21	Matthew Thomas (25)	White	Florida (Port Orange)	Thomas was killed after speeding away from officers who attempted to do a traffic stop on his vehicle, for expired tags. Thomas sped from the scene and officers attempted to stop the vehicle using stop sticks. He lost control of the car and crashed after driving over the strips and brandished a handgun at officers who opened fire.
2020-11-21	Douglas Hatfield (75)	Unknown	Arizona (Oro Valley)	Hatfield was killed after brandishing a handgun at officers when they attempted to do a wellness check at his home.
2020-11-20	Peter Russell (43)	White	Evansville, IN	
2020-11-20	Jordan D. Patterson (27)	Unknown race	Robert, LA	
2020-11-20	Name Withheld (38)	Unknown race	Upper Darby, PA	
2020-11-19	Kenneth Jones (35)	Black	Nebraska (Omaha)	Jones was a passenger in the back seat of a car pulled over by police. Jones was told 14 times to show his hands, and refused to comply with police instructions. Jones had his hand on a gun in his pants when shot by police, and when Jones was rolled over following the shooting, a gun fell from his hand.
2020-11-19	Rodney Applewhite (25)	Black	New Mexico (Los Lunas)	Applewhite was driving twice the speed limit when New Mexico State Police attempted to stop his car. A pursuit was initiated and then stopped when Applewhite began driving erratically. Police later found Applewhite standing on a highway trying to stop traffic, and when they approached him he tried to grab an officer's gun and was shot. When asked why he tried to take the gun, Applewhite said, "That's what I thought you were supposed to do".
2020-11-19	Michael Dansby (43)	White	Oklahoma City, OK	
2020-11-19	Duane Scott Murray (30)	White	Lawton, OK	
2020-11-19	Terrell Smith (17)	Black	Atlanta, GA	
2020-11-18	Pedro Martinez (66)	Hispanic	Tyler, TX	
2020-11-17	Name Withheld	Unknown race	Miami, FL	
2020-11-17	James Horton (42)	White	Bonnieville, KY	
2020-11-17	Shawn Lequin Braddy (37)	Black	Laurel, MD	
2020-11-17	Dustin James Acosta (28)	White	St. Augustine, FL	
2020-11-17	Devon Tillman Gregory (18)	Black	Florida (Jacksonville)	Gregory and two others were pulled over for failure to maintain a single lane. After Gregory refused to leave the car, four officers fired at him. The other two people in the car were not injured. A gun was recovered from the vehicle, and the medical examiner stated that Gregory suffered from a self-inflicted gunshot wound in addition to the shots by police.
2020-11-17	Javon Brice (39)	Black	Tennessee (La Vergne)	A man opened fire on a K9 Patrol Unit, killing a police dog, (Sjaak). The man then got out and fired again, and was shot by the Officer in the car. The man then got back into his car, and drove off, before crashing into a parked car, and being taken to the hospital for his wounds, which he later succumbed to.
2020-11-16	Shane K. Jones (38)	Black	Dania Beach, FL	
2020-11-16	Joshua D. Evans (32)	White	Batesville, IN	
2020-11-16	Shawn Lequin Braddy (37)	Black	Maryland (Laurel)	Braddy was wanted in connection with a homicide in Oakleaf, Florida. When officers in Laurel attempted to arrest Braddy he fired at them, hitting one, and was shot.
2020-11-15	David Donovan (35)	Caucasian/White	New Hampshire (Meredith)	According to a witness, Donovan was chasing two of his family members and nicked the witness with a knife when she tried to hug him. After officers arrived, they used a taser which failed to work, and then shot Donovan twice. The witness criticized police conduct in the incident.
2020-11-15	Christa Markwell (50)	Caucasian/White	Texas (Lubbock)	Police were called at 2:05pm with a report of property damage at Markwell's apartment. At 6:17pm, police came to the apartment and made contact with Markwell. Police say that she was holding a weapon, and have not yet specified the kind of weapon. When an officer told Markwell to drop the weapon, she did not do so. In response, the officer shot Markwell, fatally injuring her. Markwell's neighbors described her as mentally ill, specifically paranoid and delusional. They said that Markwell would often call the police based on her delusions, and would often come the door holding a wooden pepper grinder to keep herself safe.
2020-11-15	Name Withheld	Black	Inglewood, CA	
2020-11-14	Jake Settle (40)	White	Cantonment, FL	
2020-11-14	Augustine Morales (38)	Hispanic	Sacramento, CA	
2020-11-14	Angelo Castigliola Jr. (66)	Hispanic	Corpus Christi, TX	
2020-11-14	Tho Xuan Ngo (46)	Asian	Westminster, CA	
2020-11-13	Sincere Pierce (18)	Black	Florida (Cocoa)	Police say that they were investigating a possibly stolen car when Angelo Crooms, the driver of the car, accelerated the car towards one of the officers. The officer then fired his gun at the car. Crooms and Sincere Pierce, a passenger in the car, were both fatally injured. Family and lawyers say the teens had permission to use the vehicle. During Pierce's funeral, his mother was accidentally shot by a 16-year-old.
2020-11-13	Angelo Crooms (16)	Black	Florida (Cocoa)	Police say that they were investigating a possibly stolen car when Angelo Crooms, the driver of the car, accelerated the car towards one of the officers. The officer then fired his gun at the car. Crooms and Sincere Pierce, a passenger in the car, were both fatally injured. Family and lawyers say the teens had permission to use the vehicle. During Pierce's funeral, his mother was accidentally shot by a 16-year-old.
2020-11-13	Tracey Leon McKinney	Black	Gulfport, MS	
2020-11-13	Cody William Amman (31)	White	Gillette, WY	
2020-11-13	Charles Craig Meeks (38)	White	Unincorporated, MT	
2020-11-12	Henry Lee Frankowski III	Unknown race	Gulfport, MS	
2020-11-12	Name Withheld (39)	Unknown race	Philadelphia, PA	
2020-11-11	Brandon Milburn (37)	Black	Oklahoma City, OK	
2020-11-11	Chris Mellon (61)	Unknown race	Scottsdale, AZ	
2020-11-11	Eric Lyn Clark (52)	Unknown race	Winchester, VA	
2020-11-10	Vusumuzi Kunene (36)	Black	Lanham, MD	
2020-11-10	Douglas E. Rash (44)	White	Jefferson, OH	
2020-11-10	Daniel David Reyes (27)	Hispanic	Oildale, CA	
2020-11-10	Daron Jones (29)	Unknown race	Nederland, TX	
2020-11-09	Ronny Dunning (22)	Unknown race	Woodinville, WA	
2020-11-09	Saul Robert Salgado	Hispanic	Santa Fe Springs, CA	
2020-11-09	Rodney Eubanks (25)	Black	Maryland (Baltimore)	Police say that they returned fire after Eubanks opened fire on plainclothes officers. His brother had been fatally shot in the same spot two weeks prior on October 26.
2020-11-08	Frederick Cox (18)	Black	North Carolina (High Point)	Cox was attending a funeral when a drive-by shooting occurred. Witnesses say Cox was helping people to safety when a sheriff's deputy attending the funeral shot and killed him.
2020-11-08	Rodriguez Duandre Pam (33)	Hispanic	Evansville, IN	
2020-11-08	Terry David Fox (58)	Unknown race	Kingston Springs, TN	
2020-11-07	Wendy Jones (56)	White	Sedona, AZ	
2020-11-07	Jesse James Kale Brown (34)	White	Missoula, MT	
2020-11-07	Steven Campos (43)	Unknown race	Lilburn, GA	
2020-11-06	David Viveros (26)	Hispanic	Rialto, CA	
2020-11-05	Reginald Alexander Jr. (25)	Black	Dallas, TX	
2020-11-05	Jacob Rucker (36)	White	Tulsa, OK	
2020-11-05	Luis Robert Zaragoza Barbosa (36)	Hispanic	Crestview, FL	
2020-11-05	Javier Magaña (32)	Latino	California (Ventura)	Police say that they attempted to detain Magaña after he was involved in a shooting. After a car chase, Magaña's car was disabled and he ran away. An officer pursuing Magaña said that Magaña had a gun in his hand, fired the gun, and then pointed the gun at the police officer. The police officer then shot Magaña, who died at the scene.
2020-11-04	Darren Butrick (60)	White	Kent, WA	
2020-11-04	Dean Trasente	White	Colorado Springs, CO	
2020-11-04	Justin Reed (34)	Black	Jacksonville, FL	
2020-11-04	Michael Moza (30)	White	Detroit, MI	
2020-11-04	Justin Hammack (26)	White	Lewistown, IL	
2020-11-03	Xavier Tedtaotao	Unknown	Guam (Tamuning)	Four officers were investigating a stolen phone and car when the driver allegedly hit a police car and another vehicle and police fired. The driver, Xavier, was killed, and his wife was injured. Viki Ann Tedtaotao died a few days later.
2020-11-03	Viki Ann Tedtaotao	Unknown	Guam (Tamuning)	Four officers were investigating a stolen phone and car when the driver allegedly hit a police car and another vehicle and police fired. The driver, Xavier, was killed, and his wife was injured. Viki Ann Tedtaotao died a few days later.
2020-11-03	Jessee Duane Bowers (55)	Hispanic	San Antonio, TX	
2020-11-03	Jonathan Torres Ramirez (20)	Hispanic	Oakland, CA	
2020-11-03	John Wesley Seymour (59)	Unknown race	Beaumont, TX	
2020-11-03	Guy Bradly Able (56)	White	New Port Richey, FL	
2020-11-03	Jason Neo Bourne (38)	Unknown	Nevada (Henderson)	2020 Henderson shooting: Bourne was shot and killed by police after murdering three people and injuring another in an apartment complex.
2020-11-02	Caleb Slay (25)	Unknown race	Springfield, MO	
2020-11-02	John Mellone (39)	White	Lynn, MA	
2020-11-02	Thomas Celona (35)	Caucasian/White	Massachusetts (Winchester)	Police were called after Celona reported a problem at his apartment unit. When police arrived, they found Celona holding two knives, and shot him after he refused to drop them.
2020-11-01	Quincy Ivan Bishop (30)	White	Puyallup, WA	
2020-11-01	Trifton Stacy Wacoche (26)	Native American	Kenwood, OK	
2020-11-01	Jason S. Cline (43)	Unknown race	Seymour, IN	

== See also ==
- Death in custody § United States
- Henry A. Wallace Police Crime Public Database
- List of cases of police brutality
- List of countries with annual rates and counts for killings by law enforcement officers
- List of law enforcement officers killed in the line of duty in the United States
- List of law enforcement officers convicted for an on-duty killing in the United States
- List of shootings by US immigration agents
- List of police reforms related to the George Floyd protests
- List of unarmed African Americans killed by law enforcement officers in the United States
- Lists of killings by law enforcement officers
- Police brutality in the United States
- Police misconduct § United States
- Police riot § United States
- Police use of deadly force in the United States
