= 2020 Williamsburg massacre =

Familicide in West Virginia, U.S.

- The location of the shooting
- Location: 37.99253°N 80.50927°W; Williamsburg, West Virginia, United States
- Date: December 8, 2020; 5 years ago
- Attack type: Mass murder; Arson; Mass shooting; Murder-suicide; pedicide
- Weapon: .410 gauge single-shot shotgun
- Deaths: 6 (including the perpetrator)
- Injuries: 0
- Perpetrator: Oreanna Myers

On December 8, 2020, in Williamsburg, West Virginia, United States, 25-year-old Oreanna Myers shot and killed five children, aged between one and seven, with a shotgun before setting her house on fire and committing suicide. Myers was the biological mother of three of the children, and the stepmother of the other two. It is the worst mass shooting in West Virginia history alongside the rampage of Mark Storm in 1997.

== Incident ==
At around 2:30 p.m. (EST) on December 8, 2020, in Williamsburg, West Virginia, 25-year-old Oreanna Myers was seen picking up two of her children from a bus stop. Myers was the biological mother of three of the children, and the stepmother of the other two. She shot all five of her children with a .410 single-shot shotgun before setting their two-story house on fire in an act of arson. Myers then left the building and fatally shot herself outside, where her body was found alongside the shotgun near a picnic table. She had shot herself in the head, and there was a "red line drawn across her face and the bridge of her nose, underneath her eyes, that went from ear to ear”. It took until December 12 to find and identify all the victims' bodies.

911 was alerted of the property on fire at 3:30 p.m., and fire crews arrived at 3:50 p.m. to find the home badly damaged. Myers' body was found just before 4:30 p.m. along the home's south side. Myers' husband, Brian Bumgarner, had been away from the home at various times across a 10-day period before the incident. This was due to a recent car accident which made him decide to stay with other family members so he could get rides to work.

Three handwritten suicide notes were found in their car, one of which was a confession to the murder of all five children and her suicide. The notes stated that "This is no one’s fault but my own" and included apologies to her husband and discussion of her struggles with mental health.

== Aftermath ==
During a December 7, 2021 hearing of the Joint Committee on Children and Families, CPS was questioned for their actions regarding the case. One of the children murdered in the incident had been seen by a dentist, who noted that the child was scared of his father and had a large bruise. The father was also seen verbally abusing the child outside. CPS was called on August 10, four months before the shooting, but the call was ended by the operator and the reporter was told that there would be no investigation. A protocol was added as of October 2021 to make sure every call made to centralized intake is recorded by CPS and Senator Stephen Baldwin planned in the aftermath to introduce laws reforming how CPS deals with possible crimes against children.

The West Virginia Department of Health and Human Resources (DHHR) was later sued by the biological mother of two of the children as a result of the incident, claiming that the DHHR had received several reports of her children being abused while in the care of Myers and her husband, which were ignored. The children had been removed from her care in 2016 due to apparent neglect. Myers had previously attacked her, which resulted in an arrest warrant being issued against her; the lawsuit alleges that the DHHR knew of this, but did not act. The DHHR was ordered to be dissolved and split into three organizations in 2023 after apparent mismanagement.

== See also ==
- List of mass shootings in the United States in 2020
- Clemmons family murders, the worst case of mass murder in West Virginian history
