= Julia Markham =

American mass murderer

- Born: Julia Johnson; 1870-1871; Rio, Illinois
- Died: September 30, 1905; Henry County, Illinois U.S
- Cause of death: Suicide by cutting
- Known for: Murdering her children
- Spouse: Clarence Markham
- Children: 7

Details
- Victims: 7
- Date: September 30, 1905
- Country: United States
- State: Illinois
- Location: Cambridge, Illinois
- Weapons: Axe and butcher knife

Julia Johnson Markham, was an American mass murderer, who murdered her seven children with an axe in Cambridge, Illinois, United States.

On September 30, 1905, neighbors saw the home of the Markham's on fire. Outside, they found the matriarch of the family, 35-year-old Julia Markam crawling out, badly burned and bleeding from the neck. Authorities arrived on the scene and Julia at first said a stranger had attacked her and murdered the children with an axe. Authorities didn’t believe her story, and Julia soon confessed to murdering her children and setting the home on fire.

Julie would die after her confession, succumbing to her wounds, as the authorities found the remains of her seven children inside the house.

The murders of the Markham children are considered to be one of the worst mass murders in the history of Illinois. The murders have also garnered attention due to presume paranormal activity of Julia haunting the area where the murders happened.

== Background ==
Julia Johnson Markham was born to Mary Johnson in Rio, Illinois.

In 1896, she married Clarence Markham. And together they would have seven children together. It was said Julia kept to herself and Clarence allowed her to do anything she was comfortable with. It was said Julia suffered from mental problems, with one incident where she attempted to commit suicide by jumping into a cistern, where she was rescued. Her husband, noticing Julia’s mental condition, kept the older children home so they could watch her. When Clarence’s father came to visit the family, he observed her declining mental health. However he believed he she was bored from her monotone life. On September 13, 1905, Julia’s mother was committed to a mental asylum, which took a toll on Julia’s mental health. Her husband, noticing Julia’s deteriorating mental condition, kept the older children home from school so they could watch her.

== Murders ==
When her husband was away, Julia sent her eldest two children, 8-year-old Clara and 7-year-old Henry, out to fetch a pail of water. When they left, Julia grabbed an axe, and began hitting her youngest children, 6-year Charles, 4-year-old Mary, 3-year-old Lucy, 15-month-old Eliza, and 4-month-old Asia, in the head with it, killing them. When her Clara and Henry returned, she attacked them with the axe and killed them. Julia then placed all of children in their beds except for Clara, and doused their bodies in kerosene oil and set fire to them. Julia then cut her own throat with a butcher knife.

Originally planning on perishing the fire, Julia instinctively crawled out of the house where she was spotted by neighbors who rescued her. Authorities arrived on the scene and questioned Julia on what happened. She told the authorities that a man had came in and attacked her and the murdered children. The authorities not believing her, pressured her to tell the truth. Apprehensive on confessing, Julia asked what would happen to her if she did. The authorities replied that her injuries were severe and that she would succumb to them. Julian then confessed to the act and died minutes later after doing so.

Later a letter carrier delivered a letter to Clarence that was sent out by Julia before the murders occurred and how she did it for the children. It is believed that Julia committed the murders because she didn’t want to be her or her children to be committed to an asylum like her mother was.

== Legacy ==
In the aftermath of the murders, newspapers ran sensational articles on Clarence saying he committed suicide in a horrific manner, but in reality he didn’t, and attended to funeral of his family.

The area where the murders occurred, had supposed sightings of paranormal activity of Julia, who haunts the area.

== See also ==
- Simon Nelson
- Woolfolk family murders
- Clemmons family murders
