= Clemmons family murders =

1805 familicide in Clarksburg, U.S.

- Location: Clarksburg, Virginia, United States
- Date: November 10–11, 1805
- Attack type: Familicide, filicide, axe murder, mass murder
- Weapon: Axe
- Deaths: 10 (including an unborn child)
- Perpetrator: Abel Clemmons
- Motive: Unknown, possibly mental illness

On the night of November 10–11, 1805, 33-year-old Abel Clemmons murdered his wife and eight children in an axe attack in their home outside of Clarksburg, Virginia, United States. One of the first news accounts, entitled Murder—Horrible Murder!!, became known as an early "horror classic" during the late American Frontier years, resurging in popularity during reporting on other mass killings.

Clemmons was caught a few days after escaping the scene and sentenced to death. He was executed by hanging in June 1806.

== Background ==
According to his autobiography, Abel Clemmons was born in Waterford, New Jersey, around 1775, "on the eve of the Revolution" to middle-class parents. Clemmons claimed to have experienced "cruel abuse" by a blacksmith and a merchant during apprenticeships when he was twelve years old. After his father died by suicide, Clemmons and his mother moved to live at Redstone Old Fort in Pennsylvania. Clemmons left home at age fifteen, spending the next four years on what he described as a "career of fornication and adultery" with seven different young women, the last of whom fell pregnant. Clemmons claimed he fled Pennsylvania because of this, since his mother refused to let him get married as a minor. He moved to Clarksburg, West Virginia, (then Virginia), at the time of small frontier town of 200 inhabitants, where, despite growing moral concerns, Clemmons continued having illicit relationships.

In June 1794, Clemmons, at age 19, married his wife, Barbara Carpenter, the daughter of an early Harrison County official. Clemmons still had concurrent affairs with other women after the marriage. After Carpenter became pregnant for the first time, they moved in with Clemmons' mother in Redstone, where he supervised farm work. After the birth, the couple returned to Harrison County, where he resumed his infidelity. He ceased this behaviour in 1800, upon seeing a meteor and taking the sight as "a message from God to alarm the wicked". Clemmons subsequently dedicated himself to Methodism in order to "obtain the pardon and favor" from God, though never formally subscribing to one particular Christian doctrine. He attended Methodist meetings every day and night, listening to arguments on the faith. He found the arguments of a "well-dressed stranger", who was a proponent of Deism, particularly convincing due to his stance that "the souls of dead would return to God".

In Harrison County, Clemmons and his family, consisting of his wife Barbara, five daughters, two sons, and an infant of unknown gender, lived on the lands of U.S. Army Colonel George Jackson, about .5 miles (0.80 km) outside of Clarksburg, Virginia. Some relatives of Clemmons lived nearby, with a niece sometimes living at their residence. Clemmons was described as having a good relationship with his family and as having "the character of honesty and industry", although one account stated that he was "always thought be a very narrow-hearted soul". Clemmons had last announced plans to move the family to Miami Valley, Ohio. In the weeks prior to the murder of his family, he was observed to be gloomy and melancholy, presumably due to great anxiety for the welfare of his large family.

== Murders ==
On November 10, 1805, Clemmons murdered his pregnant wife Barbara and eight children with an axe. The Virginia Argus, in a letter composed by John G. Jackson, George Jackson, William Tate, and Elias Stillwell, stated Clemmons had killed them while they were asleep in three separate beds in the same room. Clemmons' niece was inside the house during the murders, but was spared after Clemmons experienced regret for his actions, imploring the girl "to be obedient to her parents, and strive to obtain Christianity".

A man named Neisly, who purchased a part of Clemmons' crop, went early in the morning to the Clemmons house. Finding Clemmons in a state of agitation and insanity, he assumed the family was asleep. He saw the niece, who had no knowledge of the killings although she had been present in the house. Neisly left the home, unsuspicious of what happened. A brother of Clemmons', Isaac, who lived some miles away and had plans to move with him to Ohio, visited his home and asked about Clemmons' family. Upon being told they were asleep, Isaac went inside to wake them and found the oldest child, Clemmons' 12-year-old son, dead in his bed. After accusing Clemmons of murder, his brother ran to alarm the neighbors, while Clemmons fled. Neighbors gathered in and found what the Argus described as "a scene the most shocking to relate": the wife and an infant in one bed, four daughters in another, and two boys and a girl in a third bed.

== Aftermath ==
The story was published the day it was reported by Joseph Campbell and Forbes Britton of the Monongalia Gazette which became an early "horror classic." It is usually presented as the first published account, though there exists a different article also by Campbell and Britton titled A Particular Account of a Horrid Murder with identical text, albeit less professionally printed.

After committing the murders, he hid in a cliff of rocks on the north side of the town, but surrendered after a few days.

Clemmons, who was taken into custody in early December 1805, pleaded not guilty at his Morgantown trial in May 1806. Clemmons confessed to the killings, saying he wanted God to receive his family's souls and that he had intended to kill himself with a noose he had prepared. He insisted that his wife and most of their children died painlessly, except for two of his daughters, Betsy and Parthenia, who struggled with their father before they were killed. He was found guilty and hanged from a locust tree near Decker's Creek in the town on June 30, 1806. A 1910 local history book opined that Clemmons was likely insane, but that was not a valid defense at the time.

== See also ==
- 2020 Williamsburg shooting
- Julia Markham
