= 2020 Springfield, Missouri shooting =

Spree shooting in Missouri, U.S.

- Springfield (Missouri) Springfield (the United States)
- Location: 37.21066°N 93.23709°W; 2885 East Chestnut Expressway; Springfield, Missouri, United States
- Date: March 15, 2020; 11:24 – 11:43 p.m. (CST)
- Attack type: Mass shooting, spree shooting, murder–suicide
- Weapons: 7.62×39mm SKS semi-automatic rifle; 9mm Glock semi-automatic pistol
- Deaths: 5 (including the perpetrator)
- Injuries: 2
- Perpetrator: Joaquin S. Roman
- Motive: Unknown

On March 15, 2020, a mass shooting occurred in Springfield, Missouri, United States. After firing indiscriminately from his vehicle at passers-by, 31-year-old Joaquin Roman shot and killed four people at a Kum & Go convenience store before committing suicide.

== Shooting ==
Between 11:24 p.m. and 11:43 p.m. CST, multiple emergency calls were made regarding a man in a black 2019 Volkswagen vehicle shooting at random vehicles in eastern Springfield. The shooter drove northward before crashing his vehicle at a Kum & Go convenience store on East Chestnut Expressway. He entered the store at 11:43 p.m. and opened fire on those inside, killing three and injuring one. An employee who was wounded told the Springfield News-Leader that the shooter had a "psychotic break" and "gave a speech about being disrespected throughout his life and wanting to inflict pain on others". One person inside the store survived by hiding from the gunman. Officers Christopher Walsh and Josiah Overton of the Springfield Police Department were shot at in the parking lot as they responded to the shooting; Walsh was fatally wounded, and Overton was struck twice, one bullet was stopped by his body armor, and the second bullet tore into his shoulder and knocked him down. After other officers arrived at the scene, they discovered that the shooter had committed suicide.

== Victims ==
The victims inside the store were identified as 57-year-old employee Troy Rapp, 46-year-old waste management contractor Shannon Perkins, and 22-year-old customer Matthew Hicks-Morris. The police officer killed outside the store was 32-year-old Christopher Walsh. Employee Jayme Gilson was shot five times but survived; he was initially hospitalized in critical condition, but was upgraded to stable condition on March 26. Police officer Josiah Overton suffered non-life-threatening injuries.

== Investigation ==
On March 16, police served a search warrant at Roman's apartment in Springfield. Due to concerns that the shooter had planted booby traps in his residence, a SWAT team used a Lenco BearCat to enter the apartment. Police recovered accessories—including ammunition and magazines—for the SKS rifle and Glock pistol used in the attack. Both firearms used in the shooting were legally acquired. Items that were seized included an iPad, a computer, paperwork, and a counterfeit Social Security card. Police are trying to determine a motive for the attack using Roman's electronic devices and other belongings.

== Perpetrator ==
The shooter was identified as 31-year-old Joaquin S. Roman (1988 – March 15, 2020). Prior to the shooting, he had talked to his mother about being "infiltrated" and had searched online for "mental illness" and "tactical shooting". Roman's mother had spoken to him by phone call shortly before the shootings began, and was planning to visit him from another state due to concerns about her son's mental health. Roman had minor interactions with law enforcement, consisting of four traffic citations. He had moved from California to Missouri in 2019.

In Mass Attacks in Public Spaces: 2016 - 2020, a 2023 report released by the United States Secret Service, Roman was described as holding "neo-Nazi and anti-government beliefs" which he expressed on social media. He also used an unspecified social media platform to establish groups pertaining to his ideology. In one group, he and another member "ranted about server administrators that did not tolerate neo-Nazism" and intended to livestream a campaign of online harassment against groups they felt opposed them.

== Response ==
Springfield mayor Ken McClure and Police Chief Paul Williams expressed their condolences to those affected by the shooting. Following the shooting, Kum & Go created a relief fund for the families of the victims.

== See also ==
- List of mass shootings in the United States in 2020
