= Haynie family murders =

2020 familicide in Utah, U.S.

- Location: Grantsville, Utah, United States
- Date: January 17, 2020; 6 years ago c. 1:00 – c. 6:15 p.m. (MST)
- Target: Family members
- Attack type: Mass murder, mass shooting, familicide
- Weapon: Handgun
- Deaths: 4
- Injuries: 1
- Perpetrator: Colin Jeffrey "CJ" Haynie

On January 17, 2020, 16-year-old Colin Jeffrey "CJ" Haynie shot and killed his mother and three siblings and injured his father in Grantsville, Utah. The incident was the deadliest mass shooting in Utah since the 2007 Trolley Square shooting that killed six including the gunman, and Grantsville's first homicide in nearly 20 years.

== Familicide ==
Police told reporters that Haynie shot and killed his mother and 12-year-old sister first at around 1:00 pm and waited to attack the others when they arrived home. They were shot multiple times in their heads, necks, and upper bodies. His 15-year-old sister was killed sometime after she arrived home between 2:00 and 5:00 pm, and was shot multiple times as well, five times in the head and chest. When his 14-year-old brother arrived home around 5:17 pm, he was shot once in the head. Haynie shot his father in the leg when he returned home around 6:15 pm, but he survived.

After being shot, the father reportedly wrestled away the weapon, and was told by Haynie that his intention was to kill everyone in the house except himself, per charging documents.

Haynie had an older brother, who was at Utah Valley University at the time of the shooting and therefore avoided injury.

== Legal proceedings ==
Haynie was charged as an adult in the 3rd District Court with four counts of aggravated murder, one count of attempted aggravated murder and five counts of illegal discharge of a firearm.

During his initial appearance in court, Haynie was ordered to stay in a juvenile detention facility with bail set at $4 million. He was also issued a public defender.

As he is a juvenile, Haynie cannot be sentenced to death or life imprisonment without parole. He faces a minimum of 25 years, and a maximum of life in prison with parole.

On July 19, 2022, Haynie pleaded guilty in the shooting. On July 12, 2023, he was sentenced to five sentences of 25 years to life, with four of them to be served consecutively.

== Aftermath ==
In memory of the victims, yellow ribbons and signs were posted on trees and other objects around the neighborhood and town. Two online fundraisers had been created for the family, one through GoFundMe and another through a local market.

Shortly after the shooting, Governor Gary Herbert tweeted his condolences and urged adults with guns in their homes to make sure they were properly secured.

== See also ==
- List of mass shootings in the United States in 2020
