= 2020 Henderson shooting =

Mass shooting in Nevada, U.S.

- Henderson (Nevada) Henderson (the United States)
- Location: 36.03465°N 115.04854°W; 1445 Stonelake Cove Avenue; Henderson, Nevada, United States
- Date: November 3, 2020; 11:00 – 11:24 a.m. (PST)
- Attack type: Mass shooting
- Weapon: .40-caliber SIG Sauer P226
- Deaths: 4 (including the perpetrator)
- Injuries: 1
- Perpetrator: Jason Neo Bourne
- Motive: Unknown

On November 3, 2020, a mass shooting occurred at the Douglas at Stonelake Apartments in Henderson, Nevada, United States. 38-year-old Jason Neo Bourne, who lived at the apartments, shot several of his neighbors, killing two, wounding one, and taking one hostage. Bourne was later shot and killed by responding police officers when he threatened the hostage in his car.

== Shooting ==
Around 11:00 a.m. PST, a gunman forcibly entered his neighbor's apartment at the Douglas at Stonelake Apartments and shot three people with a handgun, killing two and wounding one; the shooter also kidnapped a 12-year-old boy. Police quickly arrived at the complex after an emergency call reporting gunfire. While the officers searched for the gunman, he called police dispatchers, rambling incoherently, referring to himself as "Bane" and demanding a helicopter. Police found the gunman in a Cadillac Escalade with the boy he had taken hostage. After attempts to de-escalate the situation, police allege the gunman put his weapon to the boy's head, causing police to open fire on the vehicle. The gunman and the boy were killed. Police believe the shooter was killed by police gunfire, and police allege the boy was shot by the gunman. The shooting was recorded by officers' body cameras. In the body camera videos, once the Sergeant ordered a singular officer to fire, several police officers are seen blindly firing into the rear of the car where the hostage and gunman were. Another officer was on the scene, telling the other officers to shut off all their cameras.

== Victims ==
The victims were identified as 38-year-old Diana Hawatmeh, her 12-year-old son Joseph, and 33-year-old Veronica Muniz, the Hawatmeh's housekeeper. A fourth victim, 16-year-old Yasmeen Hawatmeh, Dianne's daughter, was critically injured after being shot multiple times, which rendered her a paraplegic.

In 2022, the father of Joseph Hawatmeh filed a federal lawsuit against the Henderson Police Department, accusing police of firing the shots that killed Joseph.

== Perpetrator ==
The gunman was identified by police as 38-year-old Jason Neo Bourne, who lived in an apartment above the Hawatmeh family. The gunman Christopher Curry had legally changed his name to Jason Neo Bourne, possibly in reference to the character Jason Bourne and Neo from The Matrix. No known motive has been established.

== See also ==
- List of homicides in Nevada
- List of mass shootings in the United States in 2020
