= West Virginia Department of Health and Human Resources =

State agency of West Virginia

Agency overview
- Formed: February 1, 1989; 37 years ago
- Dissolved: January 1, 2024; 2 years ago
- Superseding agencies: Department of Human Services; Department of Health; Department of Health Facilities
- Jurisdiction: State of West Virginia
- Website: www.dhhr.wv.gov

The West Virginia Department of Health and Human Resources (WVDHHR or more commonly DHHR) was a government agency of the U.S. state of West Virginia. The department administered the state's health, social, and welfare programs. In 2023, the West Virginia Legislature passed H.B. 2006, that dissolves the DHHR and replaced it with three new agencies effective January 1, 2024. Governor Jim Justice signed the bill into law on March 4, 2023.
