= Williamsburg, West Virginia =

- Unincorporated community
- Location within West Virginia Location within the United States
- Coordinates: 37°58′12″N 80°29′32″W
- Country: United States
- State: West Virginia
- County: Greenbrier
- Elevation: 2,192 ft (668 m)
- Time zone: UTC-5 (Eastern (EST))
  - Summer (DST): UTC-4 (EDT)
- ZIP code: 24991
- Area codes: 304 & 681
- GNIS feature ID: 1549184

Williamsburg is a small unincorporated community in Greenbrier County, West Virginia, United States. Williamsburg is 10 miles (16 km) west of Falling Spring. Williamsburg has a post office with ZIP code 24991.

The community derives its name from Albert Williams, a local pioneer.

== See also ==
- Williamsburg massacre, a mass murder that occurred in Williamsburg on December 8, 2020
