= List of rampage killers in the United States =

This is a list of mass or spree killers in the United States. A mass murderer is typically defined as someone who kills four or more people in one incident, with no "cooling off" period, not including themselves. A mass murder typically occurs in a single location where one or more persons kill several others.

Specific notable subtypes of mass murder, including politically motivated crimes, workplace killings, school attacks and familicides, have their own lists.

This list does not include serial killers or major figures in politics and government who orchestrated such actions.

== List of rampage killers ==
Perpetrator	Date	Year	Location	State	Killed	Injured	Weapons Used	Fate	Ref.
González, Julio, 35	March 25	1990	New York City	(New York (state)) New York	87	6	A	Died in prison	
Paddock, Stephen, 64	Oct 1	2017	Paradise	Nevada	60	413+	F	Committed suicide Two of the victims died in 2019 and 2020; attributed to this event	
Kehoe, Andrew Philip, 55	May 18	1927	Bath Township	Michigan	44–45	57–58	EF	Committed suicide in truck bomb blast One victim is theorized to have died of injuries one year after the disaster	
Graham, Jack Gilbert, 23 (Note: At least one of the victims was a relative of the assailant.)	Nov 1	1955	Longmont	Colorado	44	0	V E	Sentenced to death and executed	
Doty, Thomas G., 34	May 22	1962	Unionville	Missouri	44	0	V E	Killed by the explosion	
Gonzales, Francisco, 27	May 7	1964	Danville	California	43	0	VF	Committed suicide	
Zimmer, Andrew, 16	June 26	1977	Maury	Tennessee	42	37	A	Arrested and charged.	
Burke, David, 35	Dec 7	1987	San Luis Obispo	California	42	0	VF	Committed suicide or died in the crash	
Epperly, Elnora, 23	Jan 7	1950	Davenport	Iowa	41	0	A	Wasn't found competent to stand trial	
Frank, Julian Andrew, 32	Jan 6	1960	Bolivia	North Carolina	33	0	E	Committed suicide bombing	
Unknown	Jun 24	1973	New Orleans	Louisiana	32	15	A	Unsolved	
Pates, Robert Eugene, 31	Nov 8	1982	Biloxi	Mississippi	27–29	43+	A	Charged	
Taylor, Louis, 16	Dec 20	1970	Tuscan	Arizona	29	0	A	Convicted and later released	
La Torre De, Diaz, Humberto, 19	Sep 4	1982	Los Angeles	California	25	30	A	Sentenced to 625 years in prison	
Kelley, Devin, 26	Nov 5	2017	Sutherland Springs	Texas	25	22	F	Committed suicide Terminated a pregnancy	
Leonard, Peter, 22	June 30	1974	Port Chester	(New York (state)) New York	24	32	A	Sentenced to 15 years imprisonment. Released.	
Hennard, George, 35	Oct 16	1991	Killeen	Texas	23	27	F V	Committed suicide	
Holman, George, 47	Aug 3	1944	San Francisco	California	22	27	A	Convicted and sentenced to life	
Huberty, James, 41	July 18	1984	San Diego	California	21	19	F	Killed by police Terminated a pregnancy	
McNamara, James B., 28	Oct 1	1910	Los Angeles	California	21	100+	E	Died in prison	
Figuero Alejandro, 44	Sep 13	1970	Los Angeles	California	19	25	A	Sentenced to life imprisonment	
Card, Robert, 40	Oct 25	2023	Lewiston	Maine	18	13	F	Committed suicide	
Conklin, Russell, 44	Oct 18	1984	Paterson	New Jersey	15	60	A	Sentenced to 20 years imprisonment	
Carver, James, 20	July 4	1984	Beverly	Massachusetts	15	11	A	Sentenced to two life sentences at the Massachusetts Correctional Institution-Cedar Junction	
Pattan, Stanford, 26	July 9–11	1953	Mendocino	California	15	0	A	Senteced to 20 years imprisonment. Released after 3 years.	
Jabbar, Shamsud-Din, 42	Jan 1	2025	New Orleans	Louisiana	14	57	VF	Killed by police in a shootout	
Thessen, Charles, 35	Sep 12	1966	Anchorage	Alaska	14	0	A	Sentenced to three consecutive 20 year sentences	
Madera-Flores, Israel, 30	July 15	1982	Waterbury	Connecticut	14	0	A	Sentenced to life imprisonment without parole	
Hasan, Nidal Malik, 39	Nov 5	2009	Fort Hood	Texas	13	32	F	Sentenced to death	
Lassiter, Robert Lee, 25	Dec 11	1965	Chicago	Illinois	13	22	A	Sentenced to 100–150 years imprisonment	
Wong, Jiverly, 41	April 3	2009	Binghamton	(New York (state)) New York	13	4	F	Committed suicide	
Unruh, Howard, 28	Sep 6	1949	Camden	New Jersey	13	3	F	Found mentally unfit to stand trial Died in an institution in 2009	
Holmes, James Eagan, 24	July 20	2012	Aurora	Colorado	12	62	F E	Sentenced to life imprisonment	
Moore, Valarie, 47	Oct 31	2006	Reno	Nevada	12	32	A	Sentenced to life imprisonment	
Álvarez, Juan Manuel, 25	Jan 26	2005	Los Angeles	California	11	177	V	Sentenced to life imprisonment	
Unknown	Dec 29	1975	New York City	(New York (state)) New York	11	74	E	Unsolved	
Tran, Huu Can, 72	Jan 21	2023	Monterey Park	California	11	9	F	Committed suicide	
Pough, James, 42	June 17/18	1990	Jacksonville	Florida	11	6	F V	Committed suicide Killed a man on May 8, 1971	
Long, Ian, 28	Nov 7	2018	Thousand Oaks	California	11	1	FM	Committed suicide One more died by stray police gunfire	
Starkweather, Charles, 19; Fugate, Caril Ann, 14	Jan 21–29	1958	Lincoln & Bennet; Douglas	Nebraska; Wyoming	11	0	FM	Starkweather sentenced to death and executed Fugate sentenced to life imprisonment and paroled in 1976; Also killed two dogs Starkweather killed a man on November 30, 1957	
Unknown	Jul 22	1916	San Francisco	California	10	40	E	Unsolved	
Unknown	Nov 24	1917	Milwaukee	Wisconsin	10	6	E	Unsolved	
McLendon, Michael, 28 (Note: At least five of the victims were relatives of the assailant.)	March 10	2009	Kinston, Samson & Geneva	Alabama	10	6	F A	Committed suicide Also killed four dogs	
Silka, Michael, 25	April 28 / May 17–19	1984	Fairbanks & Manley Hot Springs	Alaska	10	1	F	Killed by police Terminated a pregnancy	
Corona, Juan Vallejo, 37	May 6/9–21	1971	Sutter County	California	10	0	M	Sentenced to life imprisonment Killed 15 other people in 1971	
Mullin, Herbert, 25	Jan 25 / Feb 10–13	1973	Santa Cruz County	California	10	0	FM	Sentenced to life imprisonment Killed three people in 1972	
Al-Issa, Ahmad, 21	March 22	2021	Boulder	Colorado	10	0	F	Sentenced to life imprisonment	
Twigg, Gilbert, 35	Aug 13	1903	Winfield	Kansas	9	25	F	Committed suicide	
Bertucci, Clarence, 23 (Note: Assailant was a member of the military, police, or a comparable force at the time of the rampage.)	July 8	1945	Salina	Utah	9	19	F	Found not guilty by reason of insanity	
Betts, Connor, 24	Aug 4	2019	Dayton	Ohio	9	17	F	Killed by police	
Ferri, Gian Luigi, 55	July 1	1993	San Francisco	California	9	5	F	Committed suicide One of the victims died in 1995; attributed to this event	
Cooksey Jr., Cleophus, 35	Nov 27 / Dec 2/13–17	2017	Phoenix	Arizona	9	0	F	Sentenced to death	
Cline, Philip Bruce, 23	Feb 10	1981	Winchester	Nevada	8	350+	A	Sentenced to life in prison without parole	
Jones, Walter, 20; Jones, William, 18	Sep 28	1913	Harriston	Mississippi	8+	14+	F	Both killed by angry mob William killed a man in 1909	
DeFord, Ray Martin, 11	June 28	1996	Aloha	Oregon	8	14	A	Convicted and sentenced to 13 years in state custody	
Saipov, Sayfullo Habibullaevic, 29 (Саипов, Сайфулло Хабибуллаевич)	Oct 31	2017	New York City	(New York (state)) New York	8	11	V	Sentenced to life imprisonment	
Hawkins, Robert, 19	Dec 5	2007	Omaha	Nebraska	8	4	F	Committed suicide	
Collins, Melvin, 38	Nov 6	1948	Chester	Pennsylvania	8	3	F	Committed suicide	
Kamenoff, Peter Dumas, 42; Muller, Ralph Smith, 33	Dec 10	1958	Los Angeles	California	8	3	E	Killed while committing the suicide bombing.	
Brown, Carl Robert, 51	Aug 20	1982	Miami	Florida	8	3	F	Killed	
Tornes, Kenneth, 32	Oct 4 April 24	1994; 1996	Jackson	Mississippi	3 5	0 3	F	Sentenced to death	
Stewart, Robert, 45	March 29	2009	Carthage	North Carolina	8	2	F	Sentenced to life imprisonment	
Dekraai, Scott Evans, 54	Oct 12	2011	Seal Beach	California	8	1	F	Sentenced to life imprisonment	
Nance, Romeo, 23	Jan 21	2024	Joliet	Illinois	8	1	F	Committed suicide	
Sheley, Nicholas, 28	June 23–30	2008	Sterling, Rock Falls & Galesburg; Festus	Illinois; Missouri	8	0	M	Sentenced to life imprisonment	
Speight, Christopher Bryan, 39	Jan 19	2010	Virginia	Virginia	8	0	F	Sentenced to 5 life terms plus 18 years.	
Crimo III, Robert, 21	July 4	2022	Highland Park	Illinois	7	48	F	Sentenced to life imprisonment	
Phillips, Monroe, 58	March 6	1915	Brunswick	(Georgia (U.S. state)) Georgia	7	30+	F	Killed	
Ator, Seth, 36	Aug 31	2019	Odessa; Midland	Texas	7	25	F	Killed by police	
Ford, Priscilla Joyce, 51	Nov 27	1980	Reno	Nevada	7	22	V	Died while awaiting execution	
Everette, Eugene, 32	March 28/29	1970	New York City	(New York (state)) New York	7	15	F A	Sentenced to life imprisonment	
Bonner, William, 25	April 22	1973	Los Angeles	California	7	9	F	Sentenced to life imprisonment	
Ashbrook, Larry, 47	Sep 15	1999	Fort Worth	Texas	7	7	F	Committed suicide	
Collins, Darnell, 33	June 17–21	1995	Atlantic City; New York City	New Jersey (New York (state)) New York	7	3	F	Killed by police	
Goh, One L., 44	April 2	2012	East Oakland	California	7	3	F	Surrendered to police	
Chang, Gung Ung	July 18/19	1898	Oakland	California	7	2	FME	Killed by the explosion	
Reynolds, William, 35	April 6	1902	Tuscumbia	Alabama	7	2	F	Killed by police Also killed several horses	
Pearson, Eric, 56	March 16	1968	Ironwood	Michigan	7	2	F	Sentenced to life imprisonment	
Hardesty, Billy, 21	Oct 3/4/18/19	1978	Ypsilanti	California; Michigan	7	2	FM	Sentenced to life imprisonment Also killed a cat	
Dantzler, Rodrick, 34	July 7	2011	Grand Rapids	Michigan	7	2	F	Committed suicide	
Whitney, Dennis, 17	Feb 12 – March 5	1960	Victorville; Phoenix & Tucson; Miami	California; Arizona; Florida	7	1	F	Sentenced to death, later changed to life imprisonment	
David, Rachal, 39 (Note: All the victims were members of the same family.) (Note: All the victims were killed in the same household.)	Aug 3	1978	Salt Lake City	Utah	7	0	M	Committed suicide	
Jumper, Jim	Feb 14	1889	Okeechobee	Florida	6+	1	F	Killed	
Brooks, Darrell Edward, 39	Nov 21	2021	Waukesha	Wisconsin	6	62	V	Sentenced to life imprisonment	
Igrić, Damir, 29	Oct 3	2001	Manchester	Tennessee	6	33	MV	Died in the crash	
Rodger, Elliot, 22	May 23	2014	Isla Vista	California	6	14	FMV	Committed suicide	
Marcelino, Julian, 30	Nov 24	1932	Seattle	(Washington (state)) Washington	6	13	M	Sentenced to life imprisonment	
Loughner, Jared, 22	Jan 8	2011	Casas Adobes	Arizona	6	13	F	Sentenced to life imprisonment	
Cruse, William, 59	April 23	1987	Palm Bay	Florida	6	10	F	Sentenced to death, died in prison	
Linton, Nicole, 37	Aug 4	2022	Windsor Hills	California	6	8	V	Terminated a pregnancy. Convicted of murder and awaiting fate.	
Gully	Aug 29	1910	Willow Patch	Nevada	6	7	F	Killed	
Barton, Terry, 38	June 8–28	2002	Douglas Jefferson Park Teller counties	Colorado	6	6	A	15 years probation.	
Young, Harry, 27–28; Young, Jennings, 35–36	Jan 2	1932	Brookline	Missouri	6	3	F	Each killed the other Harry killed a man in 1929	
Crump, Wiley, 67	Sep 21	1967	Philipp	Mississippi	6	3	F A	Killed by a posse	
Talović, Sulejman, 18	Feb 12	2007	Salt Lake City	Utah	6	3	F	Killed by police One of the victims died in 2023; attributed to this event	
Henry, DeWitt Charles, 26	July 23	1977	Klamath Falls	Oregon	6	2	F	Sentenced to life imprisonment Terminated a pregnancy	
Taylor, Laura, 16; Keene, Marvallous, 19; Smith, DeMarcus Maurice, 17; Matthews, Heather Nicole, 20	Dec 24–26	1992	Dayton	Ohio	6	2	F	Keene executed in 2009; the rest were sentenced to life	
Drake, Lynwood, 43	Nov 7/8	1992	Morro Bay, Paso Robles & San Miguel	California	6	2	FM	Committed suicide	
Vang, Chai Soua, 36	Nov 21	2004	Birchwood	Wisconsin	6	2	F	Sentenced to life imprisonment	
Huff, Kyle, 28	March 25	2006	Seattle	(Washington (state)) Washington	6	2	F	Committed suicide	
Zamora, Isaac Lee, 28	Sep 2	2008	Alger	(Washington (state)) Washington	6	2	F	Sentenced to life imprisonment	
Dalton, Jason, 45	Feb 20	2016	Kalamazoo County	Michigan	6	2	F	Sentenced to life imprisonment	
Belachheb, Abdelkrim, 39	June 29	1984	Dallas	Texas	6	1	F	Sentenced to life imprisonment Died in prison in 2017	
Peterson, Tyler, 20	Oct 7	2007	Crandon	Wisconsin	6	1	F	Committed suicide	
Thornton, Charles, 52	Feb 7	2008	Kirkwood	Missouri	6	1	F	Killed by police	
Unknown	Sep 17	1911	Colorado Springs	Colorado	6	0	M	Unsolved; Possibly connected to the Villisca axe murders	
Goins, John, 49	March 18	1926	Stockton & Galt	California	6	0	F	Committed suicide	
Murray, Bruce, 32	Dec 10	1968	Paterson	New Jersey	6	0	A	Sentenced to life imprisonment	
Swinney, Frank, 28	April 15–18	1970	Wichita; Indianapolis	Kansas; Indiana	6	0	FMA	Died in prison	
Benoist, Emile Pierre, 20	Aug 26	1977	Hackettstown	New Jersey	6	0	F	Committed suicide	
Stewart, Raymond, 29	Jan 27 – Feb 2	1981	Rockford; Beloit	Illinois; Wisconsin	6	0	F	Sentenced to death and executed	
Moreno, Eliseo, 24	Oct 11	1983	College Station & Hempstead	Texas	6	0	F	Sentenced to death and executed	
Stewart, Howard, 37	Sep 16/22	1987	Lebanon; Corsicana	Missouri; Texas	6	0	F	Committed suicide Also killed two dogs	
Leonard, Eric, 22	Feb 12/19	1991	Sacramento	California	6	0	F	Sentenced to death	
Gibson, Johnny Earl, 37	Sep 22	2001	Fairfield	Alabama	6	0	A	Sentenced to life imprisonment	
Vargas, Pedro, 42	July 26/27	2013	Hialeah	Florida	6	0	F A	Killed by police	
Jones, Dwight, 56	May 31 – June 3	2018	Scottsdale & Fountain Hills	Arizona	6	0	F	Committed suicide	
Kot, Russell, 51	Feb 10	2026	Fort Lauderdale & Bee Ridge	Florida	6	0	F	Committed suicide	
Moore, Lawrence, 25	May 7	1981	Salem	Oregon	5	18	F	Sentenced to life imprisonment One of the victims died in 2013; attributed to this event	
Harris, Will, 29	Nov 1	1906	Asheville	North Carolina	5	12	F	Killed by angry mob	
Oyler, Raymond Lee, 36	Oct 26	2003	Banning	California	5	12	A	Sentenced to death	
Neal, Kevin, 44	Nov 13/14	2017	Rancho Tehama	California	5	11	F	Committed suicide	
King, Alvin, 45	June 22	1980	Daingerfield	Texas	5	10	F	Committed suicide while awaiting trial	
Paris, Richard, James, 27	Jan 7	1967	Las Vegas	Nevada	5	8	E	Committed suicide	
Murphy, Sheree Dionne	June 7	2007	Riverdale	Georgia	5	7	A	Sentenced to life imprisonment	
George, Leroy Valentino, 21	July 10	1999	Baton Rouge	Louisiana	5	6	V	Convicted	
Klink, Herman, 40	March 6	1933	Cleveland	Ohio	5	6	F	Killed by police	
Santiago-Ruiz, Esteban, 26	Jan 6	2017	Broward County	Florida	5	6	F	Sentenced to life imprisonment	
Cooper, Simon	Jan 1/7	1897	Magnolia & Lynchburg	South Carolina	5	5	FM	Killed by police Suspect in the Woolfolk-murders	
Ingenito, Ernest Martin, 26	Nov 17	1950	Franklin Township & Minotola	New Jersey	5	4	F	Sentenced to life imprisonment	
Pickett Jr., Charles, 50	June 7	2016	Kalamazoo	Michigan	5	4	V	Sentenced to 40 years in prison	
Chvarak, Barry, 21	February 3	1980	El Paso	Texas	5	3	F	Sentenced to life in prison	
Vernon, Michael, 22	Dec 19	1995	New York City	(New York (state)) New York	5	3	F	Sentenced to life imprisonment Killed two men between 1993 and 1995	
Ramos, Jarrod Warren, 38	June 28	2018	Annapolis	Maryland	5	3	F	Sentenced to life imprisonment	
Nightengale, Jason, 32	Jan 9	2021	Chicago & Evanston	Illinois	5	2	F	Killed by police	
McLeod, Lyndon James, 47	Dec 27	2021	Denver & Lakewood	Colorado	5	2	F	Killed by police	
Crossley, Wayne Lee, 31	July 24	1984	Hot Springs	Arkansas	5	1	F	Committed suicide One of the victims died in 1986; attributed to this event One more injured by stray police gunfire	
Stawicki, Ian Lee, 40	May 30	2012	Seattle	(Washington (state)) Washington	5	1	F	Committed suicide via gunshot	
Whittmore, Christina Sue, 31	Jan 14	2026	Corning	California	5	1	V	Died in the crash	
Neumann Jr., John Robert, 45	June 5	2017	Orlando	Florida	5	0	F	Died of a self-inflicted gunshot wound	
Attias, David, 18	Feb 23	2001	Isla Vista	California	5	0	V	Sentenced to up to 60 years at the Patton State Hospital since he was found to be legally insane; conditionally released in 2012	
Sueppel, Steven, 42	March 23	2008	Iowa City	Iowa	5	0	M	Committed suicide	
Chambers, Adacia Avery, 25	Oct 24	2015	Stillwater	Oklahoma	4	46	V	Sentenced to life imprisonment	
Mellberg, Dean, 20	June 20	1994	Fairchild Air Force Base	(Washington (state)) Washington	4	22	F	Killed by police Terminated a pregnancy	
Owens, Rashad Charjuan, 21	March 12	2014	Austin	Texas	4	21	V	Sentenced to life imprisonment	
Kulak, Frank J., 41	April 7–14	1969	Chicago	Illinois	4	21	F E	Found mentally unfit to stand trial	
Sisk, Bruce, 19 Sisk, Harriet, 18	Feb 28 - March 2	1976	Point Pleasant	West Virginia	4	11	EM	Harriet killed their son days prior. Both committed suicide.	
Decker, Newt, 35	Nov 15	1908	Okmulgee	Oklahoma	4–7	9–10	FMA	Killed by police Also killed a horse	
Pullen, Joe, 40	Dec 14	1923	Drew	Mississippi	4	8	F	Killed by angry mob	
McLeod, Harvey Glenn, 22	May 29	1972	Raleigh	North Carolina	4	7	F	Committed suicide	
Sencion, Eduardo, 32	Sep 6	2011	Carson City	Nevada	4	7	F	Committed suicide	
Danahey, Janet Louise, 23	Feb 15	2002	Greensboro	North Carolina	4	6	A	Sentenced to life imprisonment without parole. Later commuted.	
Gelman, Maksim, 23	Feb 11–12	2011	New York City	(New York (state)) New York	4	5	MV	Sentenced to 200 years in prison	
Gale, Nathan, 25	Dec 8	2004	Columbus	Ohio	4	3	F	Killed by police	
Garvey, Chase 21	July 6	2024	Florence	Kentucky	4	3	F	Committed suicide	
Reinking, Travis, 29	March 22	2018	Antioch	Tennessee	4	2	F	Sentenced to life imprisonment	
Marvin, Melissa Lynn, 29	April 6	1999	Kill Devil Hills	North Carolina	4	1	V	Sentenced to 60 years imprisonment	
Tamura, Shane Devon, 27	July 28	2025	New York City	(New York (state)) New York	4	1	F	Committed suicide	
John Charles Lesko and Michael Travaglia, 21	Dec 27 – Jan 3	1979–1980	Western Pennsylvania	Pennsylvania	4	0	F	Sentenced to death in 1982. Travaglia died in 2017 on death row while Lesko remains incarcerated on death row.	
Brashers, Robert Eugene, 33	Dec 6	1991	Austin	Texas	4	0	F A	Committed suicide in 1999 without being prosecuted Killed four other people	
Kohlhepp, Todd Christopher, 32	Nov 6	2003	Chesnee	South Carolina	4	0	F	Sentenced to life imprisonment Killed at least 3 others	
Dingle, Frances, 47	March 16	2009	Roseville	Michigan	4	0	V	Sentenced to 25 years imprisonment	
Denton Matthew, 17	Nov 10	2011	Lander	Wyoming	4	0	V	Committed suicide	
Truesdell, Luke 32	June 5	2024	Linn County	Iowa	4	0	M	Sentenced to life imprisonment	
Reardon, Charles, 49	Feb 2	1973	Miami Beach	Florida	3	139	A	Found not guilty by reason of insanity	
Kabolowsky, Robert, 20	July 10	1980	Wantagh	(New York (state)) New York	3	20	V	Found not guilty by reason of insanity	
Cornell, William	July 18	1863	Austin	Nevada	3	18–20	M	Committed suicide or killed	
Pearson, Moses, 30–31	April 25	1976	Jacksonville; Cordele, Pinehurst, Perry & Jackson	Florida (Georgia (U.S. state)) Georgia	3	13	F	Committed suicide Suspected of 6 other murders	
Ressa, Stephen Michael, 27	Sep 21	2005	Las Vegas	Nevada	3	11	V	Sentenced to life imprisonment	
Clark, Michael, 16	April 25	1965	Santa Maria	California	3	10	F	Committed suicide	
Aranda, Bennie, 26	Dec 28	1937	Oakland	California	3	9	FM	Sentenced to death, later changed to life imprisonment	
Mozingo, Douglas, 29	Oct 1	1982	Sacramento	California	3	9	F	Committed suicide while awaiting trial	
Sodini, George, 48	Aug 4	2009	Bridgeville	Pennsylvania	3	9	F	Committed suicide	
Avery, Micheal, 35	Jan 1	2024	Rochester	(New York (state)) New York	3	8	VE	Committed suicide	
Chandra, Anurag, 42	Jan 19	2020	Riverside	California	3	3	V	Sentenced to life imprisonment without the possibility of parole.	
Hamilton, Jason, 36	May 19/20	2007	Moscow	Idaho	3	2	F	Committed suicide	
Sapirman, Jonathan Douglas, 21	July 17	2022	Greenwood Park Mall, Greenwood	Indiana	3	2	F	Killed by a bystander	
Souvannasing, Sypheuang, 45	May 21	1991	Porterville	California	3	1	MA	Killed by police	
Lee, John, 29	Jan 10	2015	Moscow	Idaho	3	1	F	sentenced to life imprisonment	
Abdus-Salaam, Idris, 33	April 7	2020	Knox County	Tennessee	3	1	M	Killed by police	
Acosta, Abel, 13	Dec 26	2021	Garland	Texas	3	1	F	Currently wanted by the FBI	
Martin, Nollie Lee, 23	June 28	1972	High Point	North Carolina	3	0	A	Convicted. Killed a woman 1977 and was sentenced to death and executed.	
Lanphear, Ronald Eugene, 29; Geisinger, Diana	July 9–14	1978	Norton; Guadalupe County; San Bernardino	Kansas; New Mexico; California	3	0	F	Lanphear sentenced to life in prison without parole	
Nelson, Michael Elliott, 42	Aug 2	1988	Lodi	California	3	0	V	Committed suicide	
Buenrostro, Dora Luz, 34	Oct 25–27	1994	San Jacinto	California	3	0	M	Sentenced to death. Later commuted	
Brosnahan, John, 67	Dec 9	2011	Cambridge	Massachusetts	3	0	F	Committed suicide	
Cheng, Molly, 23	July 1	2022	Vadnais Heights	Minnesota	3	0	M	Committed suicide	
Decker, Travis Caleb, 32	June 2	2025	Chelan County	(Washington (state)) Washington	3	0	M	Committed suicide	

== Home intruders ==
Perpetrator	Date	Year	Location	State	Killed	Injured	W	Additional Notes	Ref.
Ying, Leung, 29	August 22	1928	Fairfield	California	11	4	FM	Sentenced to death Committed suicide while awaiting execution Possibly killed 3 people years earlier	
Thomas, Christopher, 34	April 15	1984	New York City	(New York (state)) New York	10	0	F	Sentenced to 83 to 250 years in prison Terminated a pregnancy Released from prison in 2018	
Unknown	May 14	1906	Milton	Florida	9	0	MA	Unsolved; Possibly connected to the Villisca axe murders	
Cummins, Michael Lee, 25	April 17/27	2019	Sumner County	Tennessee	9	0	M	Sentenced to life imprisonment The sole survivor died in 2022; attributed to this event	
Unknown	September 13	1878	Hockley	Texas	8	1	FMA	Unsolved	
Hight, Spencer James, 32	September 10	2017	Plano	Texas	8	1	F	Killed by police	
Unknown	June 10	1912	Villisca	Iowa	8	0	M	Unsolved; Possibly connected to 18 other murders	
Layer, Henry, 35	April 22	1920	Turtle Lake	North Dakota	8	0	FM	Sentenced to life imprisonment	
Speck, Richard Franklin, 24	July 14	1966	Chicago	Illinois	8	0	M	Sentenced to death Later changed to 400 to 1200 years in prison	
Wagner, George William; Wagner, George (accused); Wagner, Edward Jacob	April 22	2016	Pike County	Ohio	8	0	F	George William Wagner sentenced to life imprisonment Edward Jacob Wagner sentenced to life imprisonment	
Unknown	November 20	1965	Sunbury	Pennsylvania	7	7	F A	Unsolved	
Nelson, Martin, 24	May 5	1885	Bonito City	New Mexico	7	1	F	Killed	
Plume, James Little, 24	October 11	1903	Two Medicine	Montana	7	1	FM	Sentenced to 40 years in prison	
Carlton, Julian, 30	August 15	1914	Spring Green	Wisconsin	7	1	MA	Died while awaiting trial	
Rovansek, Cyril J., 31	November 4	1973	Cleveland	Ohio	7	1	F	Committed suicide	
Abeyta, Ricky, 28	January 26	1991	Chimayo	New Mexico	7	1	F	Sentenced to 146 years in prison	
Hance, Michael E., 51	August 7	2011	Copley Township	Ohio	7	1	F	Killed by police	
Unknown	April 20	1928	El Dorado	Kansas	7	0	F A	Unsolved	
Reece, Bessie	October 25	1967	Arcadia	Florida	7	0	P	Never prosecuted; the father of the victims, James Joseph Richardson was wrongfully convicted	
Freeman, John Gilbert, 41	September 3	1971	Phoenix	Arizona	7	0	F	Sentenced to life imprisonment	
Workman, William, 43	June 26	1973	Palos Hills	Illinois	7	0	F	Sentenced to 100 to 300 years in prison; died in prison in 1981; Terminated a pregnancy	
Moss, Adam Matthew, 23	August 27–30	2001	Sioux City	Iowa	7	0	M	Sentenced to life imprisonment Committed suicide in 2013	
Brooks, Darrell L., 22	October 16	2002	Baltimore	Maryland	7	0	A	Sentenced to life imprisonment	
Stewart, James, 30; Turner, Desmond, 28	June 1	2006	Indianapolis	Indiana	7	0	F	Sentenced to life imprisonment	
Unknown	September 8	2020	Aguanga	California	7	0	F	Unsolved	
Mohawk, Samuel	July 1	1843	Slippery Rock	Pennsylvania	6	2	M	Sentenced to death and executed	
Welch, David Esco, 27–29	Dec 8	1986	Oakland	California	6	2	F	Sentenced to death	
Baumberger, Albert F., 22	July 7	1893	Cando	North Dakota	6	1	FM	Sentenced to death and executed	
Davis, Arthur James, 26	August 26	1966	New Haven	Connecticut	6	1	F	Sentenced to death Later changed to life Also killed two dogs	
Marks, Cyrano, 39	July 12	1999	Atlanta	(Georgia (U.S. state)) Georgia	6	1	F	Committed suicide	
James, Llewelyn, 16	February 4/5	2002	Winslow Township & Lindenwold	New Jersey	6	1	FM	Sentenced to 315 years in prison	
Jones, Thomas	March 21/22	1900	Garner	North Carolina	6	0	MA	Sentenced to death and executed	
Batson, Albert Edward, 20	February 13	1902	Welsh	Louisiana	6	0	FM	Sentenced to death and executed	
Davis, Walter Chesley, 48	May 7	1907	San Francisco	California	6	0	F	Found not guilty by reason of insanity	
Bannon, Charles, 22	February	1930	Schafer	North Dakota	6	0	M	Killed by angry mob	
Cook, William Edward, 22	January 2–5	1951	Joplin; Ogilby	Missouri; California	6	0	F	Sentenced to death and executed Also killed a dog	
Unknown	June 25	1968	Good Hart	Michigan	6	0	FM	Unsolved	
Simants, Erwin Charles, 29	October 19	1975	Sutherland	Nebraska	6	0	F	Sentenced to death Later, found not guilty by reason of insanity	
White, Sarah Isabel, 18	December 31	1975	Greenwood	Indiana	6	0	A	Sentenced to life imprisonment	
Geschwendt, George, 24	March 12	1976	Trevose	Pennsylvania	6	0	F	Sentenced to death Also killed a dog	
Carter, Robert Earl, 26	August 18	1992	Somerville	Texas	6	0	FMA	Sentenced to death and executed	
Concepcion, Ramon, 28	May 2/3	1993	New York City	(New York (state)) New York	6	0	MA	Sentenced to 42½ years to life in prison	
Harris, Westley Devon, 22	August 26	2002	Rutledge	Alabama	6	0	F	Sentenced to death	
Victorino, Troy, 27 Hunter, Jerone, 18 Salas, Michael, 18 Cannon,Robert, 18	Aug 6	2004	Volusia County	Florida	6	0	M	Victorino and Hunter sentenced to death while Cannon and Salas get life. Also killed a dog	
Lewis, Lamont, 28; Merritt, Robert, 24	October 9	2004	Philadelphia	Pennsylvania	6	0	E	Both sentenced to life imprisonment Also killed a dog	
Strong, Preston Alton, 39	June 24	2005	Yuma	Arizona	6	0	FM	Sentenced to death Also killed a man in 2007	
Devoe, Paul Gilbert, 43	August 24/27	2007	Marble Falls & Jonestown; State Line	Texas; Pennsylvania	6	0	F	Sentenced to death	
Anderson, Michele Kristen, 29; McEnroe, Joseph Thomas, 29	December 24	2007	Carnation	(Washington (state)) Washington	6	0	F	Both sentenced to life imprisonment	
Hudson, William Mitchell, 33	November 14	2015	Palestine	Texas	6	0	FM	Sentenced to death	
Adams, Phillip, 32	April 7	2021	Rock Hill	South Carolina	6	0	F	Committed suicide	
Macias, Teodoro, 28	May 9	2021	Colorado Springs	Colorado	6	0	F	Committed suicide	
Fenniel, Shad, 31	July 3	1914	Branchville	Texas	5	5	FM	Killed by police	
Ramirez, Richard Leyva Muñoz, 25	July 2/7/20	1985	Arcadia, Monterey Park, Los Angeles & Glendale	California	5	1	FM	Sentenced to death and died in prison in 2013 Killed at least ten other people	
Crum Jr., Girley, 34	May 9	1996	Coos County	Oregon	5	0	M	Sentenced to life imprisonment without the possibility of parole	
Hodge, Bobbie Sue, 60	May 9	2019	Edgewood	Maryland	4	3	A	Sentenced to 180 years in prison	
Rader, Dennis Lynn, 28	January 15	1974	Wichita, Kansas	Kansas	4	0	M	Sentenced to 10 consecutive life sentences Killed six other people	
Djerf, Richard Kenneth, 23	September 14	1993	Phoenix	Arizona	4	0	FM	Sentenced to death	
Vang, Nengmy, 45	March 22	2017	Wausau	Wisconsin	4	0	F	Killed by police	
Boyer, Judy, 54	October 10	2021	Farwell	Michigan	4	0	F	Sentenced to life imprisonment	
Kohberger,Bryan,27	November 17	2022	Moscow	Idaho	4	0	M	Sentenced to life imprisonment	

== Familicides ==
Perpetrator	Date	Year	Location	State	Killed	Injured	W	Additional Notes	Ref.
Simmons, Ronald Gene, 47	Dec 22–28	1987	Pope County	Arkansas	16	4	FM	Sentenced to death and executed	
Banks, George Emil, 40	Sep 25	1982	Wilkes-Barre & Jenkins Township	Pennsylvania	13	1	F	Sentenced to death; died on death row in prison	
Ruppert, James Urban, 40*	March 30	1975	Hamilton	Ohio	11	0	F	Sentenced to eleven consecutive life terms	
Lawrence, Ernest, 35	June 25–26	1921	Mayfield	Kentucky	10	0	FMA	Committed suicide	
Waszak, John, 54*	April 18	1937	Muskego	Wisconsin	9	2	E	Sentenced to life imprisonment	
Pardo, Bruce Jeffrey, 45*	Dec 24	2008	Covina	California	9	2	F A	Committed suicide	
Clemmons, Abel, 33*	Nov 10	1805	Clarksburg	West Virginia	9	0	M	Sentenced to death and executed Terminated a pregnancy	
Woolfolk, Thomas George, 27*	Aug 6	1887	Macon	(Georgia (U.S. state)) Georgia	9	0	M	Sentenced to death and executed Simon Cooper is suspected of having committed the murders	
Hassell, George Jefferson, 39*	Dec 5	1926	Farwell	Texas	9	0	FM	Sentenced to death and executed Killed 4 people in 1917	
Acquin, Lorne Joe, 27	July 22	1977	Prospect	Connecticut	9	0	MA	Sentenced to 105 years to life imprisonment	
Wesson, Marcus Delon, 57*	March 12	2004	Fresno	California	9	0	F	Sentenced to death	
Sherod, Arthur, 37	April 21	1965	Newark	New Jersey	8	4	V	Charged and convicted.	
de Capua, Tony, 42	Sep 3	1927	Youngstown	Ohio	8	3	F	Found not guilty by reason of insanity	
Heinze, Guy, 22*	Aug 29	2009	Brunswick	(Georgia (U.S. state)) Georgia	8	2	M	Sentenced to life imprisonment Also killed three cats	
Elkins, Shamar, 31	April 19	2026	Shreveport	Louisiana	8	2	F	Killed by police	
Purrington, James, 46*	July 9	1806	Augusta	Maine	8	1	M	Committed suicide	
Torres, Rafael, 40	June 25	1969	Jersey City	New Jersey	8	1	M	Convicted	
Russell, Francis Lloyd, 39*	June 4	1925	Hamilton	Ohio	8	0	F	Found not guilty by reason of insanity	
Gonzalez, Celestino P., 36	July 9	1936	Indiana Harbor	Indiana	8	0	FM	Committed suicide	
Gragg, Ralph Marler, 32–33*	May 2	1951	Collettsville	North Carolina	8	0	FMA	Committed suicide	
Akulonis, Peter Joseph, 39*	April 15	1953	Lawrence	Massachusetts	8	0	FM	Committed suicide	
Pierce, Etheridge, 17	March 26/29	1992	New York City & Rochester	(New York (state)) New York	8	0	F	Sentenced to 75 years in prison	
Conley, David Ray, 48	Aug 8	2015	Houston	Texas	8	0	F	Sentenced to life imprisonment	
Godbolt, Willie Corey, 35	May 27	2017	Bogue Chitto & Brookhaven	Mississippi	8	0	F	Sentenced to death	
Smith, Alan Michael, 44	Aug 23	2026	Billings	Montana	8	0	FA	Committed suicide	
Stone, Matthew, 45	Oct 9	2026	Erie	Pennsylvania	8	0	F	Committed suicide Terminated a pregnancy	
Salcido Bojorquez, Ramon, 28	April 14	1989	Sonoma County	California	7	2	FM	Sentenced to death	
Hildebrandt, Hannah, 35*	Jan 13	1896	Marysville	Kansas	7	1	P	Committed suicide	
Collett, George M., 45	Jan 8	1935	Mount Vernon	Kentucky	7	1	F	Committed suicide	
Lias, Frankie Lee, 20*	Feb 18	1974	Fayette	Mississippi	7	1	F	Sentenced to life imprisonment	
Kirby, Judy, 31	March 25	2000	Martinsville	Indiana	7	1	V	Sentenced to 215 years in prison	
Aldridge, Joseph Jesse, 36	Feb 26	2015	Tyrone	Missouri	7	1	F	Committed suicide	
Kaiser, Moritz, 50*	Feb 28/ March 1	1878	Monroe County	Illinois	7	0	MA	Perished in the fire	
Reid, Nathan	Dec 25	1887	Worth County	(Georgia (U.S. state)) Georgia	7	0	MA	Committed suicide	
Baker, John Gerhardt, 34*	Sep 26	1897	Carrolton	Iowa	7	0	F	Committed suicide	
Kraus, August*	March 12	1903	Bellefontaine	Missouri	7	0	M	Committed suicide	
Markham, Julia*	Sep 30	1905	Cambridge	Illinois	7	0	MA	Committed suicide	
Ayer, Charles H., 43*	Jan 17	1906	Pembroke	New Hampshire	7	0	F O	Committed suicide	
Grant, James T.*	Dec 26	1911	Benton	Arkansas	7	0	M	Committed suicide	
O'Kane, Daniel, 47–48*	March 6	1916	Lawton	Oklahoma	7	0	FM	Committed suicide	
Stravisar, Mary*	July 29	1919	Kimberly	Ohio	7	0	A	Committed suicide	
Lawson, Charles Davis, 43*	Dec 25	1929	Germanton	North Carolina	7	0	FM	Committed suicide	
Geller, Ethel, 44*	May 6	1930	Columbus	Ohio	7	0	F	Committed suicide	
Gravlin, William Glenn, 30*	Sep 29	1964	Troy	Michigan	7	0	FM	Sentenced to life imprisonment	
Belcher, Harry M., 32*	Jan 25	1965	Ferndale	Michigan	7	0	A	Sentenced to life imprisonment	
Hanks, Lee M., 21	July 6	1981	Syracuse	(New York (state)) New York	7	0	A	Sentenced to 20 years to life Terminated a pregnancy	
Haggart, Robert Lee, 31*	Feb 17	1982	Farwell	Michigan	7	0	F	Sentenced to life imprisonment Killed a woman in 1977	
Lynam, Daniel Patrick, 36*	July 11	1987	Tacoma & Federal Way	(Washington (state)) Washington	7	0	F	Committed suicide	
Schnick, James Eugene, 36*	Sep 25	1987	Elkland	Missouri	7	0	FM	Sentenced to death	
Avanesian, Jorjik, 40*	Feb 6	1996	Glendale	California	7	0	A	Sentenced to life imprisonment	
Spirit, Don Charles, 51*	Sep 18	2014	Bell	Florida	7	0	F	Committed suicide	
Hart, Jennifer Jean, 38*	March 26	2018	Westport	California	7	0	V	Died in the crash	
Haight, Michael, 42	Jan 4	2023	Enoch	Utah	7	0	F	Committed suicide	
Karolkiewicz, Kristopher, 47	July 24	2026	Grand Haven Charter Township	Michigan	7	0	F A	Perished in the fire	
Helde, Paul*	July 17	1881	Eagle Creek Valley	Wisconsin	6–8	0–2	FM	Committed suicide	
Crump, Danny Eugene, 27	Sep 20	1980	Olathe	Kansas	6	3	E	Sentenced to life imprisonment	
Dotson, Jessie L., 33	March 2	2008	Memphis	Tennessee	6	3	FM	Sentenced to death Killed a man in 1994	
Cameron, Donald T., 35	Dec 9	1939	Chippewa Falls	Wisconsin	6	2	F A	Committed suicide	
Kline, Sherman, 38	Dec 18	1968	Carlinville	Illinois	6	2	F	Committed suicide	
McConaughy, Robert, 31*	May 30	1840	Hill Valley	Pennsylvania	6	1	FM	Sentenced to death and executed	
O'Neil, Patsy, 19	Sep 11	1846	Overton County	Tennessee	7	0	M	Sentenced to life imprisonment	
Lackey, Albert Newton	Aug 24	1885	Blanco City	Texas	6	1	FM	Killed by angry mob	
Cooper, Emma, 42*	June 12	1908	Cadillac	Michigan	6	1	F	Committed suicide	
Schoch, Kathryn Dempsey, 37*	Dec 22/23	1934	Dunkirk; Pittsburgh	(New York (state)) New York; Pennsylvania	6	1	F P	Committed suicide	
Smith, Gayno Gilbert, 24	Oct; May 27	1961; 1962	Hedrick; Martinsburg	Iowa	6	1	F	Sentenced to life imprisonment	
Bell, King Edward, 31	Aug 21	1981	Indianapolis	Indiana	6	1	F	Sentenced to six consecutive 40-year terms	
Haskell, Ronald Lee, 33	July 9	2014	Spring	Texas	6	1	F	Sentenced to death	
Stone, Bradley William, 35	Dec 15	2014	Souderton, Lansdale, & Lower Salford Township	Pennsylvania	6	1	FM	Committed suicide	
Dakin*	March 25	1871	Stonefort	Illinois	6	0	M	Committed suicide	
Wampler, Lewis*	May	1884	Pleasanton	Kansas	6	0	FM	Committed suicide	
Dunham, James C.	May 26	1896	Campbell	California	6	0	FM	Escaped	
Hansen, Jens*	Jan 12	1896	Chicago	Illinois	6	0	P	Committed suicide	
Klaettke, Richard, 38*	Feb 5	1896	Chicago	Illinois	6	0	F	Committed suicide	
Naramore, Elizabeth Ann*	March 21	1901	Coldbrook Springs	Massachusetts	6	0	M	Found not guilty by reason of insanity	
Westrope, Mary E. "Mollie", 38*	June 15	1902	Brandywine	Mississippi	6	0	F A	Found not guilty by reason of insanity	
Stephens, Edwin, 35*	May 24	1905	San Rafael	California	6	0	F	Committed suicide	
McWilliams, William S., 44*	Nov 24	1905	Littleton	Iowa	6	0	M	Sentenced to death	
Johnson, Ellen C., 36*	Oct 23	1911	Braddock	North Dakota	6	0	A	Perished in the fire	
Wychopen, John, 40*	April 29/30	1916	Holland	Texas	6	0	F	Committed suicide	
Klocow, Frank, 49*	Sep 3/4	1921	Ormsby	Minnesota	6	0	F	Committed suicide	
Taylor, Guy M., 35*	Feb 11/12	1927	Utica	(New York (state)) New York	6	0	M	Committed suicide	
Millis, Phillip Noble, 37*	Dec 12	1927	Hennessey	Oklahoma	6	0	M	Committed suicide	
Pasos, Marie, 35*	Feb 15	1929	New York City	(New York (state)) New York	6	0	P	Committed suicide	
Jackson, George, 35*	Oct 25	1931	Wagener	South Carolina	6	0	F	Sentenced to death	
Albers, William Adolph, 54*	Jan 23	1936	Danville	Illinois	6	0	FM	Committed suicide	
Nollen, Elsie, 30*	Aug 28/29	1937	Denison	Iowa	6	0	P	Committed suicide	
Curtis, Lillie May, 38*	March 16	1938	Center	Texas	6	0	F	Sentenced to 495 years in prison	
Nicosia, Louise, 43*	July 10	1940	New York City	(New York (state)) New York	6	0	P	Committed suicide	
Gibson, Esker Washington, 32*	April 24	1941	Irvington	Alabama	6	0	MA	Sentenced to death and executed	
Seipel, Thomas, 31*	Jan 16	1942	Plum City	Wisconsin	6	0	F	Committed suicide	
Pulliam, Mark, 34*	Nov 2	1942	Chatsworth	(Georgia (U.S. state)) Georgia	6	0	MA	Sentenced to life imprisonment	
Dalrymple, Carl, 27*	May 17	1943	Crossville	Alabama	6	0	F	Sentenced to life imprisonment	
Bauer, William Dilworth, 48*	Jan 28	1956	Parsippany-Troy Hills	New Jersey	6	0	F	Committed suicide	
King, Rufus Allen, 33*	Oct 2	1956	Clinton	North Carolina	6	0	FM	Committed suicide	
Lewis, Earl H.*	Nov 7/8	1958	Portsmouth	Virginia	6	0	P	Committed suicide	
Soper, Roland L., 28–29*	March 4/5	1959	Lancaster	Ohio	6	0	MP	Committed suicide	
Pitelka, Charles E., 34*	May 13	1961	Lockport	Illinois	6	0	M	Committed suicide	
Bauer, Roland Jack, 31*	May 6	1962	Zion	Illinois	6	0	M	Committed suicide	
Gregor, Elizabeth, 43–44*	June 17	1963	Prospect	Pennsylvania	6	0	F	Committed suicide	
Burgan, James D., 28	Dec 3	1964	Detroit	(Pennsylvania) Michigan	6	0	F	Committed suicide	
Sartin, Mary Magdeline, 26–27*	Aug 13	1965	Bay View	Ohio	6	0	F	Committed suicide	
Suarez, Jose Antonio, 22*	April 23	1966	New York City	(New York (state)) New York	6	0	M	Not prosecuted and set free	
Bray, Charles Coatney, 40*	Dec 19	1968	Napa	California	6	0	F A	Committed suicide	
O'Leary, George T., 46*	June 8/9	1973	Boston	Massachusetts	6	0	F	Committed suicide	
DeFeo, Ronald Joseph, 23*	Nov 13	1974	Amityville	(New York (state)) New York	6	0	F	Sentenced to life imprisonment Died in prison	
Nelson, Simon Peter, 46*	Jan 7	1978	Rockford	Illinois	6	0	M	Sentenced to six concurrent prison terms of 100 to 200 years Also killed a dog	
Gilbert, James Gene, 28*	Jan 3	1981	Delmar	Iowa	6	0	F	Committed suicide	
Ellis, Ronald Quitman, 34	May 2	1981	Camp Springs	Maryland	6	0	F	Sentenced to five consecutive life terms plus 10 years	
Day, James Alan, 36*	Oct 18	1984	Evansville	Indiana	6	0	F	Committed suicide	
Dreesman, Robert, 40*	Dec 30	1987	Algona	Iowa	6	0	F	Committed suicide	
Shaw, Tracey, 26	Dec 23	1994	Philadelphia	Pennsylvania	6	0	A	Sentenced to life imprisonment	
Forsyth, Rick Wayne, 42	June 14	1993	Norwalk	Iowa	6	0	F	Sentenced to life imprisonment	
Her, Khoua, 24*	Sep 3	1998	Saint Paul	Minnesota	6	0	M	Sentenced to 50 years in prison	
Pangle, Richard Vincent, 37*	Sep 4	2000	Ava	Ohio	6	0	F A	Perished in the fire	
Soltys, Nikolay Alekseyevich, 27*	Aug 20	2001	Sacramento	California	6	0	M	Committed suicide while awaiting trial	
Wise, Jesse Dee, 21*	April 8/9	2006	Leola	Pennsylvania	6	0	M	Sentenced to life imprisonment	
Isadore, Hersel Michael, 34–35*	Dec 16	2006	Kansas City	Kansas	6	0	F	Committed suicide	
Lupoe, Ervin Antonio, 40*	Jan 27	2009	Los Angeles	California	6	0	F	Committed suicide	
Shaffer, Jacob Levi, 30	July 18	2009	Fayetteville; Huntsville	Tennessee; Alabama	6	0	M	Sentenced to life imprisonment	
Damas, Mesac, 33*	Sep 18	2009	Naples	Florida	6	0	M	Sentenced to death	
Yazdanpanah, Aziz, 56*	Dec 25	2011	Grapevine	Texas	6	0	F	Committed suicide	
Ray, Larry Don, 66	March 15	2020	Moncure	North Carolina	6	0	F	Committed suicide	
Nelson, Brian 34, and Nelson, Brittany, 32	Oct 27	2022	Broken Arrow	Oklahoma	6	0	F	Committed suicide	
McFadden, Jesse, 39	May 1	2023	Henryetta	Oklahoma	6	0	F	Committed suicide	
McFarland, Ryan Willis, 52	June 1	2026	Muscatine	Iowa	6	0	F	Committed suicide	
Mantooth, Chamberlain, 50*	Oct 13	1906	Newport	Tennessee	5–7	0–2	M	Committed suicide	
Clark, Harry, 30	June 24	1916	Osceola	Arkansas	5–6	2–3	F	Committed suicide	
Holder, Mary Ann, 36	Nov 20	2011	Guilford County	North Carolina	5	5	F	Committed suicide	
Bever, Robert, 18 and Bever, Micheal, 16	July 22	2015	Broken Arrow	Oklahoma	5	1	M	Both sentenced to life in prison	
Privacky, Seth 19	Nov 29	1998	Muskegon	Michigan	5	0	F	Sentenced to life imprisonment. Died after trying to escape	
Griego, Nehemiah, 15	Jan 19	2013	South Valley	New Mexico	5	0	F	Sentenced to life imprisonment	
Chen, Mingdong, 25	Oct 26	2013	Brooklyn	(New York (state)) New York	5	0	M	Sentenced to life imprisonment	
Westerhuis, Scott Lewis, 41	Sep 17	2015	Platte	South Dakota	5	0	F	Committed suicide	
Myers, Oreanna, 25	Dec 8	2020	Williamsburg	West Virginia	5	0	F	Committed suicide	
Conant III, Everett Eugene, 35	July 7	2011	Wheatland	Wyoming	4	1	F	Sentenced to life imprisonment	
Jacks, Banita, 33	Summer	2007	Washington, D.C.	Maryland	4	0	M	Sentenced to life imprisonment	
Watts, Chris, 33	August	2018	Frederick	Colorado	4	0	M	Sentenced to life imprisonment	
Todt, Anthony, 44	December	2019	Celebration	Florida	4	0	M	Sentenced to life imprisonment	
Oda, Paris, 46	March 20	2024	Mānoa, Hawaii	Hawaii	4	0	M	Committed Suicide	
Harshman, Tranyelle Lindsey, 32	Feb 10	2025	Byron	Wyoming	4	0	F	Committed suicide	
Silk, Kelly, 32	June 10	1999	East Hartford	Connecticut	3	2	MA	Committed suicide	
Dorgan, Roberta, 56	Feb 16	2026	Pawtucket	Rhode Island	3	2	F	Committed suicide	
Estrada, Gilberta, 25	May 29	2007	Hudson Oaks	Texas	3	1	M	Committed suicide	
Doerman, Chad, 32	June 15	2023	Clermont County	Ohio	3	1	F	Sentenced to life imprisonment	

== See also ==
- List of mass shootings in the United States
- List of mass stabbings in the United States

== Abbreviations and footnotes ==
=== Abbreviations ===
* – Marks cases where all the victims were relatives of the perpetrator.

W – A basic description of the weapons used in the murders

F – Firearms and other ranged weapons, especially rifles and handguns, but also bows and crossbows, grenade launchers, flamethrowers, or slingshots
M – Melee weapons, like knives, swords, spears, machetes, axes, clubs, rods, stones, or bare hands
O – Any other weapons, such as bombs, hand grenades, Molotov cocktails, poison and poisonous gas, as well as vehicle and arson attacks

A – indicates that an arson attack was the only other weapon used
V – indicates that a vehicle was the only other weapon used
E – indicates that explosives of any sort were the only other weapon used
P – indicates that an anaesthetising or deadly substance of any kind was the only other weapon used (includes poisonous gas)
