= List of mass shootings in the United States by death toll =

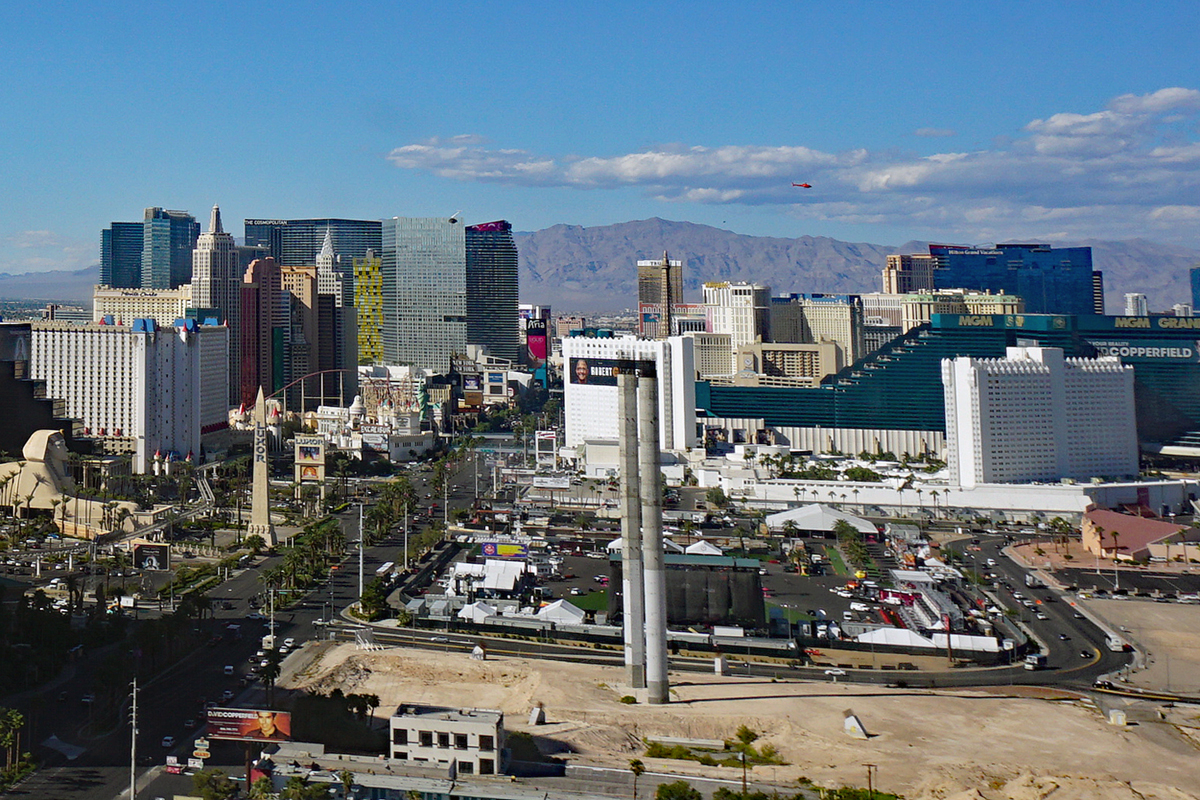
The 2017 Las Vegas shooting is the deadliest mass shooting in United States history with 60 victims.

== List ==
† Indicates shootings in which the perpetrator died.
‡ Indicates shootings in which two or more perpetrators died.

Deadliest mass shootings in the United States
Rank	Peak	Incident	Location	Deaths	Injuries	Date	Ref
1	1	Las Vegas shooting†	Paradise, Nevada	60^{LV}	867^{LV}	October 1, 2017	
2	1	Pulse nightclub shooting†	Orlando, Florida	49	58^{P}	June 12, 2016	
3	1	Virginia Tech shooting†	Blacksburg, Virginia	32	23^{VT}	April 16, 2007	
4	2	Sandy Hook Elementary School shooting†	Newtown, Connecticut	27	2	December 14, 2012	
5	5	Sutherland Springs church shooting†	Sutherland Springs, Texas	26 (Note: Death toll includes an unborn child.)	22	November 5, 2017	
6	1	Luby's shooting†	Killeen, Texas	23	27	October 16, 1991	
7	6	El Paso shooting	El Paso, Texas	23	22	August 3, 2019	
8	1	San Ysidro McDonald's massacre†	San Diego, California	22	19	July 18, 1984	
9	9	Robb Elementary School shooting†	Uvalde, Texas	21	21	May 24, 2022	
10	10	Lewiston shootings†	Lewiston, Maine	18	13	October 25, 2023	
11	8	Parkland high school shooting	Parkland, Florida	17	17	February 14, 2018	
12	1	University of Texas tower shooting†	Austin, Texas	15 (Note: Plus two victims who were killed via stabbing.)	31	August 1, 1966	
13	5	Fort Hood shooting	Fort Hood, Texas	14	32	November 5, 2009	
14	8	San Bernardino attack‡	San Bernardino, California	14	24	December 2, 2015	
15	5	Columbine High School massacre‡	Columbine, Colorado	14	23	April 20, 1999	
16	3	Edmond post office shooting†	Edmond, Oklahoma	14	6	August 20, 1986	
17	8	Aurora theater shooting	Aurora, Colorado	13	70	July 20, 2012	
18	7	Binghamton shooting†	Binghamton, New York	13	4	April 3, 2009	
19	1	Camden shootings	Camden, New Jersey	13	3	September 6, 1949	
=20	3	Wilkes-Barre shootings	Wilkes-Barre and Jenkins Township, Pennsylvania	13	1	September 25, 1982	
=20	4	Wah Mee massacre	Seattle, Washington	13	1	February 19, 1983	
22	19	Thousand Oaks shooting†	Thousand Oaks, California	12	16	November 7, 2018	
23	14	Washington Navy Yard shooting†	Washington, District of Columbia	12	8	September 16, 2013	
24	21	Virginia Beach shooting†	Virginia Beach, Virginia	12	4	May 31, 2019	
25	24	Monterey Park shooting†	Monterey Park, California	11	9	January 21, 2023	
=26	7	Jacksonville shooting†	Jacksonville, Florida	11	6	June 17–18, 1990	
=26	21	Pittsburgh synagogue shooting	Pittsburgh, Pennsylvania	11	6	October 27, 2018	
=28	3	Easter Sunday massacre	Hamilton, Ohio	11	0	March 30, 1975	
=28	6	Palm Sunday massacre	New York City, New York	10	0	April 15, 1984	
30	23	Santa Fe High School shooting	Santa Fe, Texas	10	13	May 18, 2018	
31	13	Geneva County Massacre†	Geneva County, Alabama	10	6	March 10, 2009	
32	29	Buffalo supermarket shooting	Buffalo, New York	10	3	May 14, 2022	
33	29	Boulder supermarket shooting	Boulder, Colorado	10	1	March 22, 2021	
34	29	Dayton shooting†	Dayton, Ohio	9	27	August 4, 2019	
35	1	Winfield massacre†	Winfield, Kansas	9	25	August 13, 1903	
36	2	Utah prisoner of war massacre	Salina, Utah	9	19	July 8, 1945	
37	14	Atlanta day trading firm shootings†	Stockbridge and Atlanta, Georgia	9 (Note: Plus three who were killed via bludgeoning.)	13	July 27–29, 1999	
38	15	Red Lake shootings†	Red Lake, Minnesota	9	9	March 21, 2005	
39	23	Umpqua community college shooting†	Roseburg, Oregon	9	8	October 1, 2015	
40		101 California Street shooting†	San Francisco, California	9	5	July 1, 1993	
41	2	1928 Fairfield murders	Fairfield, California	9 (Note: Plus two who were killed via axe.)	4	August 22, 1928	
42	18	Covina massacre†	Covina, California	9	3	December 24, 2008	
43	25	Charleston church shooting	Charleston, South Carolina	9	1	June 17, 2015	
=44	39	San Jose rail yard shooting†	San Jose, California	9	0	May 26, 2021	
=44	16	Wesson family murders	Fresno, California	9	0	March 12, 2004	
=44	13	Waddell Buddhist temple shooting	Waddell, Arizona	9	0	August 10, 1991	
=44		Parkin-Earl-Lang massacre	Victor, California	9	0	November 6, 1973	
=44	44	2026 Erie shooting†	Erie, Pennsylvania	9	0	October 9, 2026	
46		Sabana Seca massacre	Toa Baja, Puerto Rico	8	20	October 17, 2009	
47		Standard Gravure shooting†	Louisville, Kentucky	8	12	September 14, 1989	
=48		Indianapolis FedEX shooting	Indianapolis, Indiana	8	7	April 15, 2021	
=48		Allen mall shooting	Allen, Texas	8	7	May 6, 2023	
49		Westroads Mall shooting	Omaha, Nebraska	8	5	December 5, 2007	
=50		Market Street Massacre	Chester, Pennsylvania	8	3	November 6, 1948	
=50		Bob Moore's Welding & Machine Service Inc. massacre	Miami, Florida	8	3	August 20, 1982	

^{LV}An assessment by the Las Vegas Metropolitan Police Department determined that 413 people were injured by gunfire of the approximately 869 injured. In November 2019, a woman who was paralyzed during the shooting was pronounced dead. A second woman was pronounced dead in May 2020.

^{P}According to the Office of Community Oriented Policing Services, 53 of the 58 people injured were hit by gunfire.

^{VT}The Massengill Report states that, of the 23 injuries, 17 were caused by gunfire and six were caused by attempts to escape through windows.

== Deadliest mass shootings in the United States by year ==
This list excludes the 2014 Isla Vista attacks, in which perpetrator Elliot Rodger fatally stabbed three people and shot four others, including himself.

† Indicates shootings in which the perpetrator died.
‡ Indicates shootings in which two or more perpetrators died.

Deadliest mass shootings in the United States by year
Year	Incident	Location	Deaths	Injuries	Ref
1981	Oregon Museum Tavern shooting	Salem, Oregon	5	18	
1982	Wilkes-Barre shootings	Jenkins Township, Pennsylvania	13	1	
1983	Wah Mee massacre	Seattle, Washington	13	1	
1984	San Ysidro McDonald's massacre†	San Ysidro, San Diego, California	22	19	
1985	Springfield Mall shooting	Springfield Township, Delaware County, Pennsylvania	3	7	
1986	Edmond post office shooting†	Edmond, Oklahoma	14	6	
1987	Palm Bay shooting	Palm Bay, Florida	6	14	
1988	Sunnyvale ESL shooting	Sunnyvale, California	7	4	
1989	Standard Gravure shooting†	Louisville, Kentucky	8	12	
1990	Jacksonville shooting†	Jacksonville, Florida	11	6	
1991	Luby's shooting†	Killeen, Texas	23	27	
1992	Lindhurst High School shooting	Olivehurst, California	4	10	
1993	101 California Street shooting†	San Francisco, California	9	6	
1994	Fairchild Air Force Base shooting†	Fairchild Air Force Base, Washington	4	22	
1995	Freddy's Fashion Mart attack†	New York City, New York	7	4	
1996	Jackson firehouse shooting	Jackson, Mississippi	5	3	
1997	Channelview shooting	Channelview, Texas	5	0	
1998	Westside Middle School shooting	Craighead County, Arkansas	5	10	
1999	Columbine High School massacre‡	Columbine, Colorado	14	23	
2000	Edgewater Technology Massacre	Wakefield, Massachusetts	7	0	
2001	Navistar shooting†	Melrose Park, Illinois	4	4	
2002	Rutledge farm familicide	Rutledge, Alabama	6	0	
2003	Lockheed Martin shooting†	Meridian, Mississippi	6	8	
2004	Wesson family murders	Fresno, California	9	0	
2005	Red Lake shootings†	Red Lake, Minnesota	9	9	
2006	Hamilton Avenue murders	Indianapolis, Indiana	7	0	
2006	Goleta postal facility shootings†	Santa Barbara and Goleta, California	7	0	
2007	Virginia Tech shooting†	Blacksburg, Virginia	32	23	
2008	Covina massacre†	Covina, California	9	3	
2009	Fort Hood shooting	Fort Hood, Texas	14	33	
2010	Hartford Distributors shooting†	Manchester, Connecticut	8	2	
2011	Seal Beach shooting	Seal Beach, California	8	1	
2012	Sandy Hook Elementary School shooting†	Newtown, Connecticut	27	2	
2013	Washington Navy Yard shooting†	Washington D.C.	12	3	
2014	Montgomery County shootings†	Montgomery County, Pennsylvania	6	1	
2015	San Bernardino attack‡	San Bernardino, California	14	22	
2016	Pulse nightclub shooting†	Orlando, Florida	49	58	
2017	Las Vegas shooting†	Paradise, Nevada	60	≈ 867	
2018	Parkland high school shooting	Parkland, Florida	17	18	
2019	El Paso shooting	El Paso, Texas	23	22	
2020	2020 Morgan County shooting	Valhermoso Springs, Alabama	7	0	
2021	Boulder shooting	Boulder, Colorado	10	2	
2022	Uvalde school shooting†	Uvalde, Texas	21	18	
2023	Lewiston shootings†	Lewiston, Maine	18	13	
2024	Joliet shootings†	Joliet, Illinois	8	1	
2025	Leland shooting	Leland, Mississippi	7	18	
2026	Erie shooting†	Erie, Pennsylvania	9	0	

== Timeline of the deadliest mass shooting in United States history ==
† Indicates shootings in which the perpetrator died.

Timeline of the deadliest mass shooting in the United States
Year	Incident	Location	Deaths	Injuries	Ref
1902	Tuscumbia massacre†	Tuscumbia, Alabama	7	2	
1903	Winfield massacre†	Winfield, Kansas	9	25+	
1949	Camden shootings	Camden, New Jersey	13	3	
1966	University of Texas tower shooting†	Austin, Texas	17	31	
1984	San Ysidro McDonald's massacre†	San Diego, California	22	19	
1991	Luby's shooting†	Killeen, Texas	23	27	
2007	Virginia Tech shooting†	Blacksburg, Virginia	32	23	
2016	Pulse nightclub shooting†	Orlando, Florida	49	58	
2017	Las Vegas shooting†	Paradise, Nevada	60	≈867	

== See also ==
- List of mass shootings in the United States
