= Jacksonville shooting =

Jacksonville shooting may refer to:

- James Edward Pough, a spree killer who killed 11 people in a shooting spree on June 17–18, 1990, including nine at an auto loan office.
- Murder of Jordan Davis, the 2012 fatal shooting of an African-American teenager.
- Jacksonville Landing shooting, a 2018 mass shooting during a video game tournament at the aforementioned marketplace.
- 2023 Jacksonville shooting, a racially motivated mass shooting at a Dollar General discount store.
