= Indianapolis mass murder =

Indianapolis mass murder may refer to:

- Hamilton Avenue murders
- Indianapolis FedEx shooting
