= 1973 South Los Angeles shootings =

Spree shooting in California, U.S.

- Location: South Los Angeles, California, United States
- Date: April 22, 1973; 2:35 p.m. – 3:29 p.m. (PTZ)
- Attack type: Mass shooting
- Weapons: Handgun; 20-gauge pump-action shotgun
- Deaths: 7
- Injuries: 9
- Perpetrator: William Ray Bonner
- Convictions: First degree murder Second degree murder Assault with a deadly weapon

On April 22, 1973, a spree shooting took place in the South Side of Los Angeles, California, United States. The gunman, 25-year-old William Ray Bonner, fatally shot six people and injured nine at seven locations. Bonner was apprehended following a shootout with police, during which an intervening security guard was killed.

Bonner was sentenced to life imprisonment later the same year.

== Shooting spree ==
The shooting began at Bonner's home at approximately 2:35 p.m. after he had gotten into an argument with Otha Leavitt, a friend of his mother, (widely reported as his grandmother) who had paid them a short visit to make a phone call. Enraged, he went outside and, with a handgun, fired a shot each at 16-year-old Anthony Thomas and 17-year-old Carolyn Cleveland, who had accompanied Leavitt and waited in her car. Leaving the two teenagers severely wounded Bonner returned inside and killed Otha Leavitt with a shot in the head, before hijacking her Plymouth Valiant, which by then had been vacated by Thomas and Cleveland.

Armed with his handgun and a 20-gauge pump-action shotgun, Bonner drove to a gas station about 1.5 miles (2.4 km) from his home, where he had been employed previously as a service station attendant. Arriving there at about 2:43 p.m. he approached the occupants of a Chevrolet Impala, 18-year-old Vicky Wells and her 13-year-old sister Aileen, both known to him since their early childhood. He shot Vicky in the back with his shotgun, critically wounding her and killed Aileen, also by a shot in the back, when she was running towards the service area.

Bonner then sped away to another nearby gas station, his workplace until one week prior to the shooting spree, where he arrived at 2:45 p.m. Carrying his shotgun he entered the service bay area where he called out for his friend and former colleague, Raleigh Henderson, who had helped him get the job there. When Henderson turned around Bonner shot him once in the stomach and then fired again when Henderson exclaimed "What have I done?" Pointing at the body on the floor Bonner asked service station attendant James Morrow: "Do you know if anyone wants some of that?" He approached a female customer, fired a shot in the air. He then left for the home of Jevie Thompson, with whose son, Vernon, he'd had an argument with the night before. Bonner arrived there about 5 minutes later and killed Jevie Thompson with a shotgun blast in the stomach, and critically wounded his wife, Eddie Mae, as well as his 15-year-old son Alfred.

Bonner's next stop was Smitty's Drive-In Liquors, where he appeared at 3:14 p.m. Believing he had been short-changed there once, he killed the shop owner, Smitty Sneed, again with a shot in the stomach, and wounded a customer, 58-year-old Duly Oscar Bennett, in the shoulder, before heading towards Liquorama Liquors, where he shot and critically wounded 23-year-old employee Robert L. Smith with a shot in the stomach, and hit 28-year-old Roosevelt D. Jenkins, another employee, in the leg.

A couple of minutes later Bonner barged into the house of his ex-fiancée, 22-year-old Diane Lore Andrea, who had taken the side of Vernon Thompson during the argument the day before, and ended their relationship afterwards. He shot her in the neck with his shotgun, severing her jugular vein and spinal cord. She died instantly.

== Chase and arrest ==
Bonner eluded police until 3:25 p.m. when he was spotted in his car by two patrolling police officers, blocking their way out of an alley. Bonner pointed his shotgun at them and repeatedly pulled the trigger, but when it failed to shoot he threw it away and sped off, while the police officers fired four shots at him and initiated pursuit. When Bonner crashed his Plymouth into the rear of the car of 45-year-old Mary Felton, who had stopped at a traffic light, he jumped out of his own vehicle and into the back seat of hers. Threatening her and her two daughters with his pistol he ordered her to drive.

The scene was observed by security guard Versell Bennett who then took up pursuit in his car and eventually managed to force them to stop. Bennett then left his vehicle armed with his shotgun and opened fire at Bonner, who then shot at him in return. When police finally caught up with Bonner, a shootout ensued in which he was hit five times in his legs and lower body. Some officers aimed their fire at Bennett first, mistaking him for the gunman. He was hit twice in the head and shoulders. Mrs. Felton also suffered minor injuries in the shoulder. At 3:29 p.m., Bonner was taken into custody.

Both Bonner and Bennett were brought to Los Angeles County+USC Medical Center for treatment. Bennett died of his injuries on April 26.

== Victims ==
- Diane Lore Andrea, 22, Bonner's girlfriend
- Versell Bennett, 58, security guard,
- Raleigh "Butch" Henderson, 33, friend of Bonner
- Otha Leavitt, 53, friend of Bonner's mother
- Smitty B. Sneed, 58, owner of Smitty's Drive-In Liquors
- Jevia D. Thompson, 57
- Aileen Wells, 13

== Perpetrator ==

William Ray Bonner (born March 28, 1948) was described by his neighbors and acquaintances as a nice and quiet young man who kept to himself. According to former coworker James Morrow, Bonner never caused any trouble at work, stating "In some respects, he was one of the best". His defense attorney, Herman English, claimed to have known Bonner for 10 years, describing him as a submissive, kind and easy going person, and remarking that Bonner appeared "completely different mentally" after the shooting.

According to police files Bonner had been arrested six times since 1966 in connection with narcotics, assault and grand theft auto. In the most serious case he was sentenced to three years probation for assaulting a police officer.

Bonner's father, James A. Bonner, related to a newspaper that his son had connections to "some kind of Mafia gang" which had made threats against him and his family in the days prior to the shooting.

== Legal process ==
On April 24, sixteen felony complaints, consisting of six murder charges and ten counts of assault with intent to murder, were filed against Bonner.

Bonner's trial was held at the Torrance branch of the Los Angeles County Superior Court. Preliminary hearings for the case opened in July and on August 21, Bonner was formally charged with seven counts of murder, eight counts of assault with a deadly weapon and three counts of kidnapping, whereupon he pleaded innocent and innocent by reason of insanity. On November 13 Bonner changed his mind and pleaded guilty to one count each of first degree murder, second degree murder and assault with a deadly weapon. On December 14, he was sentenced to life imprisonment. As of 2016, Bonner was incarcerated at California Men's Colony.

== See also ==
- List of rampage killers in the United States
- List of homicides in California
