= 1965 Highway 101 sniper attack =

Sniper shooting on Highway 101

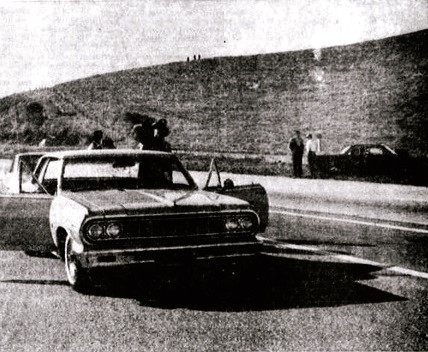
- Three vehicles struck by the sniper's gunfire, pictured upon U.S. Highway 101 following the perpetrator's suicide
- Location: 34.832°N 120.366°W; Orcutt, California, U.S.
- Date: April 25, 1965; 61 years ago
- Target: Motorists traveling along U.S. Highway 101
- Attack type: Mass shooting, triple murder, murder-suicide
- Weapons: Scoped Swedish Mauser bolt-action rifle w/ Mannlicher stock (6.5×55mm); Pistol (not used)
- Deaths: 4 (including the perpetrator)
- Injuries: 10
- Perpetrator: Michael Andrew Clark

Early on the Sunday morning of April 25, 1965, 16-year-old Michael Andrew Clark opened fire on cars traveling along U.S. Highway 101 just south of Orcutt, California, United States, from a nearby hilltop. Three people were killed and ten were wounded before Clark committed suicide upon arrival of police.

== Shooting ==
Late on the night of April 24, 1965, Michael Andrew Clark, who lived in Long Beach, California, left home in his parents' car, without their permission. In the back of the car, he had a Swedish Mauser military rifle equipped with telescopic sight and a pistol he had removed from his father's locked gun safe along with a large quantity of ammunition. Early the next morning, he climbed to the top of a hill overlooking a stretch of Highway 101 near Orcutt. As the sun came up, Clark began shooting at automobiles driving down the highway.

Two men were killed and six more people were wounded as the shooting continued for hours before Santa Barbara County Sheriff's Office deputies rushed the hill and Clark committed suicide as they closed in. A five-year-old boy wounded in the head died a day later, bringing the total to three dead for the rampage.

Reportedly the two men killed in the shooting were attempting to assist others who were trapped in a vehicle which had been hit by the gunfire.

== Victims ==
Those killed were:

- Charles Christopher Hogan, 21
- Joel W. Kocab, 28
- Kevin Dean Reida, 5

Those wounded were:

- Doris Burson, 24, injured by glass fragments
- Alice Jones, 31, injured by glass fragments
- Marvine Jones, 12, injured by glass fragments
- Bill Reida, 42, shot in the neck
- Lucille Reida, 44, wife of Bill Reida, injured by glass fragments
- Kim Alan Reida, 3, son of Bill and Lucille Reida, graze wound
- Norbert Schuerman, 38, policeman, shot in the left arm
- Kathleen Smith, 22, injured by glass fragments
- Renee Terry, 15, shot in the right forearm
- Leona Weber, wrist injury from shrapnel
- Joy Ziomek, 39, arm injury from glass fragments

== Aftermath ==
A lawsuit was eventually brought to the courts by victims William, Lucille, and Kim Reida, complaining that parents Forest and Joyce Clark were negligent in two counts: "failure of the Clarks to train, control, and supervise son Michael" and also, "failure of Forest Clark to keep the rifle out of Michael’s hands." The case was decided in favor of the Clarks and generally upheld on appeal, although the appeals court found negligence on the part of father Forest Clark for not adequately securing the weapons.

== See also ==
- List of rampage killers in the United States
- List of homicides in California
- Targets

== Cited works and further reading ==
- Cawthorne, Nigel; Tibballs, Geoff (1993). Killers. London: Boxtree. pp. 195-199, 316-322. ISBN 0-7522-0850-0.
