= 1992 San Luis Obispo County shootings =

Spree shooting in California, United States

- Location: Morro Bay, Paso Robles & San Miguel, California, United States
- Date: November 7/8, 1992; 5 p.m. – 5 a.m.
- Weapons: Baton; .32 caliber Smith & Wesson Model 30 revolver; 12-gauge Shotgun
- Deaths: 7 (including the perpetrator)
- Injuries: 2
- Motive: Revenge for personal disputes and gambling losses

Between November 7–8, 1992, a spree shooting took place in three locations across San Luis Obispo County, California, United States. Six people were killed and two were injured before the perpetrator, Lynwood "Jim" Drake, killed himself following a hostage situation.

== Incident ==
=== Shootings ===
At about 5:00 p.m., Drake, carrying a .32 caliber revolver, entered the residence of his former landlord, 80-year-old Andrew Zatko, and Zatko's 89-year-old live-in companion Gladys Walton in Morro Bay. The front door was unlocked, which was common in the town due to low crime rates. Zatko was in the process of making dinner in the kitchen, with Walton sitting at a nearby table, when Drake revealed himself and shot Zatko in the throat at point-blank range. Drake afterwards went to the home of 37-year-old Norman Metcalfe, a former neighbor and tenant of Zatko, who had testified against him at the court proceeding for his eviction and had further helped Zatko by physically removing Drake from his property. At 6:24 p.m., when Metcalfe came home accompanied by two other men, Drake killed him with a shot between the eyes. He also killed 32-year-old Danny Cizek and wounded Jeffrey Sidlin, 27, in the arm, during a struggle over his gun.

About five hours later, Drake, having armed himself with a 12-gauge shotgun, drove to Oak's Card Parlor in Paso Robles, where he had lost several hundred dollars and had been barred for troublemaking and cheating. At the back of the club, Drake fatally shot card dealers David Law, 47, and Joe Garcia, 60, as well as customer Kris Staub, 31, who had attempted to flee through a door. An additional ten customers were left unharmed after they pleaded with Drake not to fire on them.

=== Hostage situation and suicide ===
During the night, Drake traveled to San Miguel and broke into the home of 60-year-old Joanne "Joey" Morrow, who was his former landlady. Drake bludgeoned Morrow with a leather blackjack as she was sleeping in bed, fracturing her skull. Morrow, having turned on the light and taken cover under the bed, recognized Drake and asked what he wanted, to which he replied that he intended to knock her unconscious so he could hide at her house. Morrow told him that Drake "could have just asked" and the pair spent the next four hours talking. Drake told her about the three murders in Morro Bay, saying he blamed the victims for making him homeless, but did not mention the other three murders in Paso Robles. He stated that he planned the shootings because Norman Metcalfe had told him for a final time that he could not move back in. Through Morrow's line of questions, Drake revealed that despite his poor finances, he bought the firearms using welfare money and that he was pondering whether he should kill Morrow to take her truck. She tried to convince Drake to turn himself in to police, but he refused, citing mistreatment during previous jail stints.

At approximately 5 a.m. on November 8, the house was surrounded by police. Lieutenant Bob Sherwood called Morrow's landline and while she did not pick up, Sherwood spoke into the answering machine before hanging up. A second call was answered by Morrow, who lied and said that Drake was not in the house before Drake grabbed the phone and told police that he was in fact present. At Sherwood's urging, Drake agreed to consider surrendering to police, with Sherwood giving him a ten-minute waiting period, during which Drake checked how much ammunition he had left. When Sherwood called for a third time, Drake shot himself in the head. When Morrow heard the gunshot, she ran out of the room without looking back, uncertain whether Drake had shot himself or at her. Police received her at the driveway and later found Drake dead at the scene.

== Victims ==
- Andrew Zatko, 80
- Norman Metcalfe, 37
- Danny Cizek, 32
- David Law, 47
- Joe Garcia, 60
- Kris Staub, 30

== Perpetrator ==

Lynwood Crumpler Drake III was born on October 10, 1949 in Norfolk, Virginia. He had worked as a bartender, caterer and construction worker, but had also attended acting classes in New York, and had a minor role in the film The World According to Garp. At the time of the shooting he was unemployed and lived off of disability benefits and his common-law wife's welfare. Despite this, he was known to gamble excessively. Neighbours referred to Drake as "Crazy Jim" and "Snake".

In October 1990, Drake rented a house from Joey Morrow, on the condition that he acted as a handyman, but she evicted him after she learnt that he lied about his qualifications. Morrow stated that the two had left on amicable terms. In June 1991, he was arrested for assaulting a day-care worker after his daughter had suffered a cut in a fall. He was sentenced to one year's probation and ordered to complete a mental health program for aggressive people, though there is no indication that he ever did so.

In May 1992, Drake was evicted from his rental home in Morro Bay, California by his landlord, Andrew Zatko, for not paying his rent for several months. Shortly after, his wife separated from him, taking their daughter with her. Drake had regularly made death threats against neighbors, stating his intention to kill "his enemies" in a murder-suicide. The last time he did so was one day before the shootings, but as he was regarded a "nut" nobody took his threats seriously. According to investigators and acquaintances, Drake was a man who felt wronged by almost everyone he met.

== Investigation ==
According to police, Drake had planned to kill two other people that day, his pastor and the day-care worker. He had reportedly not followed through on his intentions because of car troubles after the club shooting.

A search of Drake's pants pockets found what was described as a "delusional suicide note [...] bemoaning his life of persecution". Identifying himself as Jesse Cole Younger, apparently in allusion to the James–Younger Gang, Drake wrote, in regards to the shootings in Morro Bay, "I Jesse Cole Younger killed 3 men because they took my wife, family and daughter from me." He also blamed his parents and sister for his personal issues, ending his note with the words: "They refused to help. Damn the American family to hell. God forgive me."

Author Marques Vickers wrote that the killings were ultimately "an insignificant footnote in local history".

== See also ==
- List of homicides in California
- List of rampage killers in the United States
