= James Edward Pough =

American spree killer

- Born: James Edward Pough; February 16, 1948; Jacksonville, Florida, U.S.
- Died: June 18, 1990 (aged 42); Jacksonville, Florida, U.S.
- Cause of death: Suicide by gunshot
- Occupation: Day laborer
- Motive: Life frustrations (Losses, depression, personal and financial stress)
- Conviction: Aggravated assault (Note: This was reduced from manslaughter for pleading guilty.)
- Penalty: Five years probation

Details
- Date: 1971; June 17–18, 1990
- Locations: Jacksonville, Florida, U.S.
- Killed: 13 (including himsef)
- Injured: 6
- Weapons: Röhm RG-31 .38-caliber revolver; Universal M1 Carbine

James Edward "Pop" Pough (February 16, 1948 – June 18, 1990) was an American spree killer who killed eleven people in two separate attacks in Jacksonville, Florida, on June 17 and 18, 1990. Pough shot and killed two people at random on Jacksonville's Northside, wounded two teenagers, and robbed a convenience store. Pough shot and killed nine people and wounded four others at a General Motors Acceptance Corporation (now Ally Financial) car loan office the next day before committing suicide.

In the time leading up to the shooting, Pough was living in a rundown duplex in Jacksonville. He was described as a recluse with no friends by relatives. Neighbours said he would engage in heated arguments with people about money and his car which had been repossessed by the GMAC he would later target during his shooting spree. His mother died three years prior to the shooting which Pough was to have said he had nothing left to live for and that he wanted to "take someone with him when he leaves this world". In addition, his wife separated from him and filed a restraining order against Pough after he twice threatened to kill her.

Previously in 1971, he killed his best friend during a dispute which appeared to have burdened him. He did not serve time in prison for this murder which didn't render him a felon, allowing him to purchase firearms.

At the time, the shooting at the GMAC office was the deadliest mass shooting in Florida history, surpassing the rampage of Carl Robert Brown, until it was later surpassed by the Pulse nightclub massacre on June 12, 2016, in which 49 people were killed.

== Early life ==
James Edward Pough was born on February 16, 1948, and was the first of nine children. Pough grew up in an area near Florida Community College at Jacksonville. As a child, Pough suffered from asthma and he had a close relationship with his mother, whom he helped out a lot after his father left the family in 1959. He attended a vocational school, but dropped out in his sophomore year. At the age of 18, he began working as a common laborer, which he continued until his death. During the last year of his life, he was doing construction maintenance at a brewery.

According to former schoolmates, Pough had affiliations with street gangs during his time at school. He was arrested twice in 1965 for vagrancy, and twice again in 1966, once for attempted robbery and a second time for assault after he attacked a construction worker who owed him a quarter. In 1968, Pough was arrested for dangerously displaying a knife and was fined $75, and in July 1969, he was fined $10 after being charged for gambling. In 1970, he was arrested, but not prosecuted, for motor vehicle theft and vagrancy-prowling by auto.

== 1971 killing of David Lee Pender ==
On May 8, 1971, Pough got into an argument with his best friend, David Lee Pender, who had called his girlfriend a "bitch". In the following scuffle, Pough grabbed a .38-caliber revolver from his girlfriend's purse and shot Pender three times. Pender eventually died in a hospital. According to relatives, Pough never managed to get over the fact that he had killed his friend. Pough was initially charged with murder, though the charge was later reduced to manslaughter. In the end, he pleaded guilty to aggravated assault and was sentenced to five years probation, but the judgment of his guilt was withheld by the court subject to the successful completion of probation. It was also ruled that Pough should never be allowed to own a gun due to his violent behavior in the past, though this was never forwarded to police. As a result, Pough was not considered a felon and therefore was able to purchase several handguns, among them the Röhm RG-31 .38-caliber revolver he later used to commit suicide, which was registered with the police on June 4, 1979, an automatic 9mm pistol, and a .357 revolver, which was registered on September 6, 1986. In 1977, Pough appeared twice in court for charges of bad debt, and there was also an outstanding warrant for his arrest in a 1982 employment compensation fraud case.

== Life prior to the shootings ==
In December 1988, Pough traded his old car for a 1988 Pontiac Grand Am, though he soon had difficulties making his payments. As a result, the car was voluntarily repossessed by the General Motors Acceptance Corporation (GMAC) in January 1990. He received a bill for $6,394 (around $13,200 as of 2021) of outstanding fees in March, and again on April 6, which was the last contact between him and the office. About two months prior to the shootings, Pough purchased a Universal Brand M1 carbine at a local pawnshop.

Pough was living in a rundown duplex in Jacksonville's Northwest Quadrant at the time. He was known by his neighbors as a quiet and nice man who kept a regular and fixed schedule, but also as someone who would become angry fairly quickly and get engaged in heated conversations, especially in matters concerning money and his car. Relatives described him as a recluse with no friends. After the death of his mother three years prior to the shootings, Pough was said to have emotionally changed for the worse, saying that he had nothing left to live for and arguing that he would "take someone with him when he leaves this world." Frequently, he had violent outbursts, which were directed against his wife, Theresa, and twice he threatened her by putting a gun to her head. In January 1990, they separated, as Theresa feared for her safety, and on March 2, she was granted an injunction that disallowed Pough's contacting her for a year. As a consequence, he withdrew even more and rarely socialized.

== The 1990 killing spree ==
=== First attacks ===
Pough started his killing spree in the night of June 17, 1990, at about 12:50 a.m. Armed with his blanket-wrapped M1 Carbine and not far from his home, he walked up to a group of men standing at a street corner in the Northwest section of Jacksonville and killed Louis Carl Bacon with two shots in the chest before fleeing. A couple of minutes later, he attacked Doretta Drake, who was chatting with two other women in a vacant parking lot just two blocks from the first crime scene. After hitting Drake with his car, throwing her on the sidewalk, Pough stepped out of his Buick and killed her with a single shot to the head before driving away.

A short time later, Pough also shot and wounded two youths, 17-year-old Christopher Jerome Shorter and 18-year-old Lynette Patrice Johnson, after asking them for directions. Both of them were shot in the shoulder. Later, on the morning of June 18, Pough entered a convenience store, threatened the clerk with a pistol and, stating that he didn't have anything to lose, demanded all of the money in the register. After getting the money, he left.

=== GMAC shooting ===
After robbing the convenience store, he visited his mother's grave one last time and then called his supervisor to state that he wouldn't be coming to work because he had something else to do. At about 10:44 a.m., Pough parked his car at the GMAC office located at 7870 Baymeadows Way in Jacksonville. He entered the building through the front door armed with his M1 Carbine, a Röhm RG-31 .38-caliber revolver, several loaded magazines, and ammunition packed in his pockets. Without saying a word he immediately began shooting with the M1 Carbine at two customers at the front counter, killing Julia Burgess and wounding David Hendrix with four shots. Walking through the open office he then systematically moved from desk to desk and shot at the GMAC workers, deliberately aiming at those hiding under their desks.

Drew Woods was the first to be shot at his desk, followed by Cynthia Perry and Barbara Holland nearby, as well as Phyllis Griggs, who was injured. When the GMAC employees realized what was going on, many of them escaped through a back door of the building while Pough started shooting at those ducking for cover. GMAC employees Janice David, Sharon Hall, Jewell Belote, Lee Simonton, Denise Highfill, Ron Echevarria, and Nancy Dill were also shot. Pough then put the .38-caliber revolver to his head and committed suicide. In just under two minutes Pough had fired at the least 28 rounds from his carbine; hitting 11 of the 85 workers in the office as well as the two customers. Six of his victims died at the scene, while another three died at hospital, the last being Jewel Belote, who succumbed to her wounds nine days after the shooting.

When searching Pough's car police recovered a loaded 9mm semi-automatic pistol, two magazines, and ammunition, as well as twelve pieces of nylon rope, each having a length of 24 inches, which led police to the assumption that Pough initially might have intended to take hostages. When police arrived at Pough's home, it had been ransacked. They found a calendar with two dates circled in red: May 8, the day he killed his friend Pender, and June 18.

== Victims ==
=== Killed ===
May 8, 1971

- David Lee Pender, 27

June 17, 1990

- Louis Carl Bacon, 39
- Doretta Elaine Drake, 30

June 18, 1990

- Julia Ann Burgess, 42, customer
- Drew Winston Woods, 38
- Cynthia Leigh Perry, 30
- Barbara Jean Holland, 45
- Janice Faye David, 40
- Sharon Louise Hall, 45
- Lee Merlin Simonton, 33
- Denise Diane Highfill, 36

June 27, 1990

- Jewel Louise Belote, 50 (succumbed to injuries from June 18, 1990 shooting)

=== Wounded ===
June 17, 1990

- Christopher Jerome Shorter, 17
- Lynette Patrice Johnson, 18

June 18, 1990

- David Hendrix, 25, customer
- Phyllis Griggs
- Ron Echevarria
- Nancy Dill

== See also ==
- List of rampage killers in the United States
- Gun violence in the United States
- Mass shootings in the United States
