= Crime in Glendale, California =

The Glendale Police Department responds to and records criminal acts in Glendale, California. Despite historic gang activity in the city that has decreased in frequency since the 1990s, as well as several incidents of arson, a 2024 report ranked Glendale as the hundred forty eight safest city in the United States.

== 1920s–1940s ==
Glendale police officers took on bootleggers and airmen in the 1920s, a decade when the department had both a "liquor detail" and an "air policeman" charged with citing pilots for flying violations committed over the city.

In 1944, the Glendale city manager took on Police Chief V.B. Browne over suspected officer corruption, and Browne was asked to resign for failing to control his staff.

Glendale lost two police officers in the line of duty during this period:

1. Officer Leslie O. Clem: Killed in a motorcycle accident in 1926 while pursuing a suspect's car.
2. California Highway Patrolman Loren C. Roosevelt: Killed after being shot nine times during a traffic stop, by Erwin Walker, an Army veteran and former Glendale Police Department employee.

== 1970–1990 ==
In 1972, Glendale police officer John Isaacson was killed in an automobile accident while on duty.

Angelo Buono, a Glendale auto upholsterer, was convicted of sexually torturing and murdering nine women whose bodies were dumped on Los Angeles-area hillsides in 1977 and 1978.

In 1985, the notorious serial killer and rapist Richard "The Night Stalker" Ramirez terrorized the Los Angeles area, including Glendale. He was linked to the death of Max Kneiding and his wife, Lela Ellen, who were shot to death in their Glendale home. Ramirez also was later linked to a murder just south of Glendale's Forest Lawn Memorial Park.

Beginning in 1984 with a fire in a South Pasadena hardware store and continuing into the early 1990s, now-former Glendale Fire Captain and Arson Investigator John Leonard Orr committed a series of arson fires that claimed four lives, and caused damage in the millions of dollars. He was convicted on federal arson charges in 1992, and on state-level arson and murder charges in 1998.

In June 1990, an arson fire damaged or destroyed 64 homes in Glendale's San Rafael Hills and caused $40 million in damage. Evening rush-hour traffic was brought to a halt at the height of the fire as flames burned on both sides of the Glendale Freeway. The 100-acre (0.40 km^{2}) fire, one of the worst in the city's history, resulted in flames leapfrogging from house to house, destroying some, leaving others untouched. After the devastating fire, the Glendale City Council passed a brush-clearing ordinance that called for more frequent inspection of private property by fire officials, and it allowed firefighters to cut back overgrown brush on private property and charge owners for the work.

== 1995–present ==
On February 6, 1996, a family of seven people whom immigrated from Iran, were killed in the worst arson-murder and at the time, worst mass murder in the city's history. The fire killed a Glendale mother, Turan Avanesian, and her six children, ages 4 to 17. Jorjik Avanesian, the wife of Turan, confessed to the fire saying he doused his family because he believed his wife and eldest daughters shamed the family by taking drugs that made them promiscuous. Initially facing the death penalty, he was later convicted of murdering his family. He later killed himself in jail.

In 1997, Charles Lazzaretto became the first Glendale police officer in 25 years to die in the line of duty when an attempted-murder suspect, holed up in a Chatsworth warehouse, shot Lazzaretto in the head. In the ensuing gunfight two Los Angeles police officers were wounded, and the suspect, Israel Gonzalez, committed suicide.

In 2005, 11 people died and about 180 were injured in a Metrolink (California) train accident when Juan Manuel Álvarez of Compton, California who later claimed he was suicidal parked his sport utility vehicle on the tracks in Glendale. The driver was convicted of murder.

== Gangs ==
Glendale was once home to more than 30 different gangs. Gang violence peaked in the 90s. Over time, the numbers have dropped significantly, and now there are only five documented gangs in the city. Gang activity is primarily located in the low-income, Hispanic area of South Glendale, bordering the Northeast Los Angeles neighborhoods of Atwater Village, and Glassell Park. Historically, South Glendale is claimed by the Mexican gang Tooner Ville Rifa. The gang's ongoing attempt to control this area has led to turf wars between it and rival gangs from the bordering cities. Even the arrest and conviction of one of the gang's leaders has done little to stop gang activity. The problem has pushed Glendale and Los Angeles city officials to seek an injunction against the gang, covering 4.5 square miles (12 km^{2}). This area is bordered by the Los Angeles River, the Glendale Freeway, and the streets of Broadway and Verdugo Road. In 2009, TVR was listed as one of LAPD's top 14 targeted street gangs.

Armenian Power is widely considered to be the most significant organized crime group currently operating in Glendale. Operating both as a traditional mafia crime organization and as a network of visible street gangs, AP is the subject of federal law enforcement attention, and maintains a strategic relationship with California's "Mexican Mafia" prison gang and consequentially, affiliated Sureños gangs across Greater Los Angeles. Street presence is visible along the public transit corridors along Central and Brand, and in the commercial districts, in typical mafia storefronts and businesses. Vigilance and organization, surveillance of territory is identical to any Sureños gang anywhere else in the city.

There has also been a small presence of the predominantly Filipino gang, the Avenue King Crips. They are generally located in South East Glendale, the West side of neighboring Eagle Rock, and the Northern border of Glassell Park. They are mostly known for property damage and graffiti. Typically their territory is often tagged using “AK” with a crown, “AKC” or a large blue “A”.

Another primary source of Glendale's gang problem is the Avenues gang, which has also been listed as one of the LAPD's top 14 targeted street gangs. On June 25, 2008, over 500 officers, including SWAT teams, participated in a take-down of the gang. A clique leader was arrested in the 900 block of East Windsor in South Glendale.
