= Dennis Whitney =

American spree killer

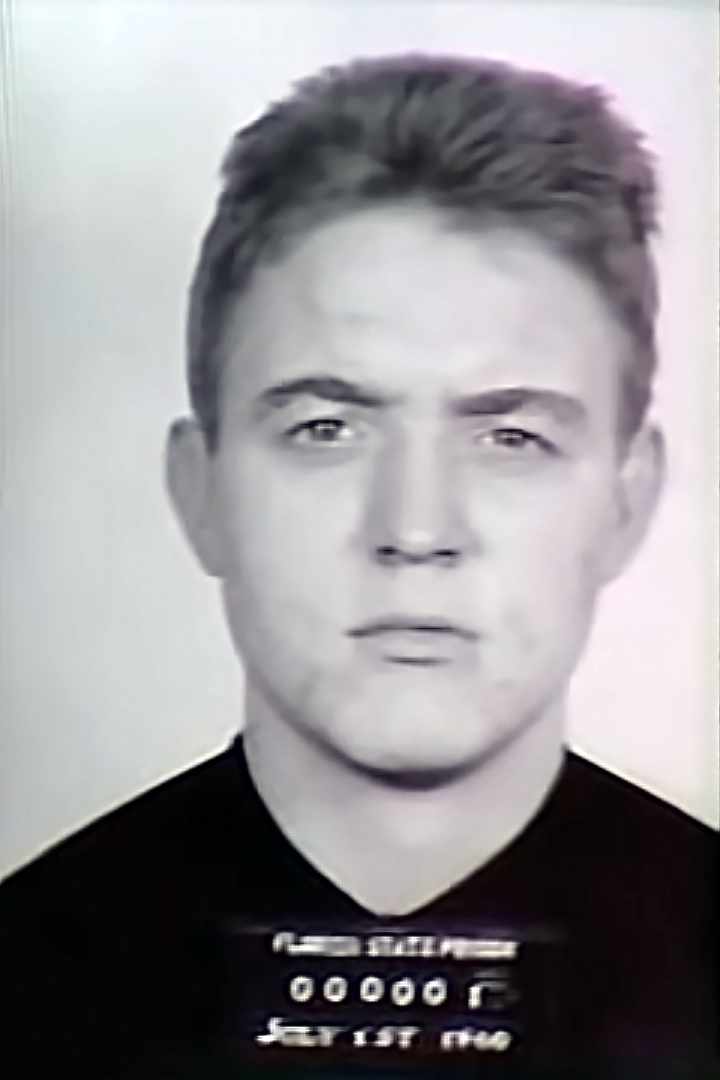
- Whitney in a 1960 prison photograph
- Born: Dennis Manaford Whitney; August 15, 1942; North Hollywood, California U.S.
- Died: April 24, 2005 (aged 62); Union Correctional Facility, Raiford, Florida, U.S.
- Conviction: First degree murder (2 counts)
- Penalty: Death; commuted to life imprisonment

Details
- Victims: 7
- Span of crimes: February 12, 1960 – March 5, 1960
- Country: United States
- States: California, Arizona and Florida
- Date apprehended: March 5, 1960

Dennis Manaford Whitney (August 15, 1942 – April 24, 2005) was an American spree killer who shot and killed seven people in early 1960. At the time of the killings, he was only 17 years old, with most of his victims being middle-aged men he shot during holdups. Whitney died in a Florida prison, where he had been serving a life sentence, on April 24, 2005. At the time of his death, he had been incarcerated for 44 years.

== Early life ==
Whitney spent the first years of his life in Victorville, California, living with his parents. It is reported from a young age he got involved in criminal subcultures and wanted to dive into a life of robbery.

== Murders ==
On February 12, 1960, Whitney entered a gas station in his home town of Victorville. After a brief holdup with an attendant named Jim Ryan, he shot the man to death and netted $30. Whitney then traveled to Phoenix, Arizona, where on February 20, he shot and killed 55-year-old Ira Lee Hardison, and 40-year-old Spencer Frazier, hours apart from one another. Whitney stole Frazier's car and drove until it broke down the next day in Tucson.

Stranded 470 miles from home, Whitney committed another gas station robbery, killing 27-year-old Glen B. Smith, and pocketed $104. With the money, Whitney hitchhiked across the country until he finally arrived in Miami, Florida, on February 24. On February 28, Whitney killed 21-year-old Miami filling station operator Ken Mezzarno.

The next day, on February 29, Whitney killed gas station attendee 53-year-old Arthur Keeler after a brief holdup which netted him $50. On March 2, Whitney wounded 28-year-old filling station attended Jack Beecher, who got away. Beecher would later give a description of the robber. On March 4, Whitney abducted 62-year-old Virginia Selby from a parking lot. He drove her to an enclosed location where he bashed and shot her to death with a claw hammer and his .22-caliber handgun. Before the murder, it is believed that Selby put up a fight that left Whitney with two gashes on his hands.

The murders caused a great stir in the Miami public. Police quickly seized to question Jack Beecher, the only survivor of the killer. Beecher claimed the shooter was a young teenage-looking red-haired male, which matched Whitney's description. Whitney, who was already a suspect in the killing of Virginia Selby, was arrested on March 5. He confessed to the Miami murders and also admitted to the murders he committed back in Arizona and California.

== Trial and imprisonment ==
Whitney was charged with two murders, those being the ones of Arthur Keeler and Virginia Selby. First spared of the death penalty for the murder of Selby, On June 28, 1960, Whitney was sentenced to death for killing Keeler. After the verdict was announced at the sentencing, Whitney appeared dazed in his seat, and his defense attorneys later revealed to the public that they were surprised that the jury held up the verdict unanimously.

In 1972, Whitney's death sentence was commuted to life imprisonment after Furman v. Georgia ruled that the death penalty was unconstitutional. Whitney died of unspecified causes in 2005, after serving 44 years in prison.

== See also ==
- Capital punishment for juveniles in the United States
- List of longest prison sentences served
