= Preston Strong =

American mass murderer

Preston Alton Strong
- Born: June 1966 (age 60); Washington D.C., U.S.
- Convictions: First degree murder (7 counts); Aggravated assault (2 counts); Armed robbery First degree burglary Attempted arson of an occupied structure (2 counts); Forgery; Theft
- Penalty: Death (May 5, 2017)

Details
- Victims: 7
- Span of crimes: 2005–2007
- Country: United States
- State: Arizona

Preston Alton Strong (born June 1966) is a convicted mass murderer and serial killer. He is on death row in the state of Arizona. In 2012, Strong was convicted of murdering Doctor Satinder Gill in the city of Yuma, Arizona, a crime which took place in 2007. Strong was sentenced to life in prison for that crime. While serving this sentence, Strong was also tried and convicted of the 2005 murder of a family of six, including four young children, in a crime that came to be known as the La Mesa Street Murders. Strong was sentenced to death in that case.

== Early life and criminal record ==
Little is known about Strong's childhood and early life, aside from the fact that he was born in June 1966 either in or near Washington, DC. As a teenager, he attended McKinley Technology High School (then called McKinley Technical High School) and graduated in 1985. While at McKinley, Strong was a tight end on the school's varsity football team.

As an adult, Strong worked at a Yuma area car dealership, but police have also referred to him as a "career con man." Aside from the Gill and La Mesa Murders, Strong has several convictions in the state of Arizona for theft and forgery among other crimes.

== La Mesa Street murders ==
On June 24, 2005, Yuma Police Department officers were called to a house at 2037 La Mesa Street to a report that shots were fired, and someone was screaming for help. When police arrived, they discovered 35-year-old Luis Rios in the back yard of the house, still alive but riddled with gunshot wounds. Rios died later at Yuma Regional Medical Center from his injuries. Not knowing what the situation in the house was, but knowing Rios and his girlfriend had children in the home, police surrounded the house and treated the scene as a potential stand-off or hostage situation, but once police entered the house, they discovered five more bodies.

A now retired police officer who was one of the first to enter the home told the local paper that the home was dark when they entered through a side door, but they immediately came upon two bodies, lying on the floor. These were the bodies of 13-year-old Andreas Crawford, and 12-year-old Enrique Bedoya who both died of asphyxiation. Later, police also discovered 29-year-old Adrienne Heredia (the girlfriend of Rios), and 9-year-old Inez Newman who were both dead from asphyxiation and 6-year-old Danny Heredia III who was dead from multiple gunshot wounds.

In the months and years following the crime, police received thousands of calls and anonymous tips and conducted over 1,300 interviews. Still, it was not until November 28, 2007, that police announced that Preston Strong was a suspect in the murders. At the time of this announcement, Strong was already in police custody for unrelated fraud charges. In the summer of 2014, Strong was officially charged with six counts of first-degree murder concerning the deaths. On April 25, 2017, Strong was convicted of six first-degree murder counts and later sentenced to death.

According to prosecutors in the case, Strong murdered the family because Rios, who at one time had been a close friend of Strong's, had stopped "giving Strong handouts."

The case garnered national media attention, being covered publications such as People. Surviving members of Adrienne Heredia's family even appeared on a 2006 episode of The Montel Williams Show, hoping psychic medium and author Sylvia Browne could provide them with answers to the case.

== Murder of Satinder Gill ==
On November 2, 2007, the body of 62-year-old Dr. Satinder Gill was discovered inside his home with his head in a bath tub filled with water. He had been suffocated, and showed signs of blunt force trauma. Some $24,000 in cash, which a friend had delivered to Gill the day before the death, was also missing from the home.

A friend of Gill's testified at trial that the day before the body was found, the doctor had called her and offered to pay her $100 to go to his house and pick up and cash a $24,000 check. The friend said the doctor was acting very strangely and that when she delivered the cash (all in $50 bills) later in the day, Gill did not fully open the door. Instead, he opened the door part-way, just enough to receive the money. The woman also testified that she had agreed to meet Gill later that night for dinner, but he never showed up. When a stranger called her from Gill's phone the next day, claiming to have found it by a canal, the friend panicked and called the police to perform a welfare check. When no one answered the door at Gill's home, firefighters eventually broke in, finding the house filled with natural gas and lit candles.

Surveillance video from a local Walmart store on November 1 showed Strong attempting to buy a $4,300 money order. The cashier told police she asked Strong for identification, claiming he did not have any. The cashier also said that because Strong had no I.D., he opted to buy four smaller money orders in amounts that did not require proof of identity. Strong's girlfriend at the time also testified in court that she had become suspicious of Strong when he gave her $9,500 in cash on the day that Gill's body was found.

The same day the Gill's body was found, Strong was taken into custody on unrelated fraud charges, and on November 28, 2007, police announced Strong was a suspect in both the Gill and La Mesa cases. While awaiting trial for the Gill murder, Strong was sentenced to 3.5 years in jail on an unrelated theft charge.

== Sentencing and aftermath ==
In 2012 Strong was sentenced to life in prison without the possibility of parole in the murder of Santinder Gill. He received an additional 25.5 years in prison for kidnapping, armed robbery burglary, aggravated assault and attempted arson, all relating to the Gill case. Two years later, while serving that sentence, he was re-arrested and tried for six counts of first degree murder in the La Mesa case. He was found guilty on all charges and sentenced to death.

Since the La Mesa case wrapped, Strong has continued to appeal both convictions, telling a journalist with The Arizona Republic he believed the police were guilty of criminal misconduct in his case. In September, 2024, the Arizona Supreme Court upheld Strong's death sentence in the La Mesa case.

== See also ==
- List of serial killers in the United States
