= Deltona massacre =

Mass murder in Volusia County, Florida

Coordinates: 28.903440°N 81.177348°W

2004 Deltona massacre
- Location: 3106 Telford Lane; Deltona, Florida, U.S.
- Date: Friday, August 6, 2004
- Attack type: Home invasion, mass murder, massacre
- Weapons: Baseball bats, machete
- Deaths: 6
- Injuries: 0
- Perpetrators: Troy Victorino, Jerone Hunter, Robert Cannon, Michael Salas

The Deltona massacre (commonly referred to as the "Xbox Murders") was a residential murder which occurred on August 6, 2004, in a home on Telford Lane in Deltona, Florida, United States. Four men broke into the home and bludgeoned six victims to death. The four attackers, apparently inspired by the film Wonderland, tortured and killed four men, two women, and a dog inside the home, making it the deadliest mass murder in Volusia County history. Their primary motive for the murders was revenge on Erin Belanger, who had evicted a squatter, Troy Victorino, from her grandmother's then-vacant house, with the secondary motive of recovering an Xbox game console and some clothing that Victorino had left behind. Victorino was able to further motivate his accomplices by pointing out that the attack would likely allow them to kill an additional person they had grievances with, who ended up not being at the house that night.

A jury found Troy Victorino, Robert Cannon, Jerone Hunter, and Michael Salas guilty of the massacre in August 2006. Seventh Circuit Judge William A. Parsons upheld the jury's death penalty recommendation and called the killings "conscienceless" and "unnecessarily torturous." He told each of the men during back-to-back sentencing hearings, "You have not only forfeited your right to live among us, you have forfeited your right to live at all." Salas and Cannon were both sentenced to life in prison, while Hunter and Victorino were sentenced to death. The death sentences of Victorino and Hunter were overturned on June 14, 2017. Prosecutors announced they would seek death sentences for the two men again, and on November 3, 2025, both were resentenced to death.

== Events precipitating the attack ==
Victorino and Hunter were among a group squatting on Belanger's grandparents' property while they were away. The group was using the property as a party house. Belanger, who had moved to Florida to look after her grandparents' home, had deputies evict the squatters and boxed up belongings left behind.

Victorino reasoned that Belanger and her housemates had "robbed" him of his Xbox and other belongings. Victorino told witnesses that, in the days before the killings, Belanger showed disrespect for him by calling police when he tried to get his belongings. "He claims he is a Latin King, he is this big gang leader and they basically disrespected him and he had to deal with that because they couldn't treat a King like that," said the witness.

One week before the murders, Victorino fired a gun in a car near the home on Telford Lane. That gun was supposed to be used for the murders, but the suspects couldn't find enough ammunition, so they rounded up about 15 baseball bats from neighborhood children instead.

Two days before the massacre, a clerk at the New Smyrna Beach Wal-Mart witnessed Victorino and his co-conspirators "laughing and giggling and being rowdy" at the store. The clerk told Volusia sheriff's investigators that she had a feeling the men "were up to no good" after spotting them in the store with baseball bats in hand.

She said Cannon told the others, "We could take this bat and swing it and knock 'em over the head and crush their skull in." Salas then jumped in, the clerk told investigators, and said: "I got a better idea. . . . We could bash 'em in the face and knock their teeth down their throat."

Victorino had been arrested July 29, 2004 for assaulting another man, but posted bail the next day. Richard Burrow, Victorino's probation officer, was notified of the arrest and was required to file a report to a judge detailing the arrest within 48 hours. This report could have sent Victorino back to jail on a probation violation. Paul Hayes, Burrow's supervisor, did not receive the report until August 4, and a judge did not receive it until August 6, after the massacre. In addition, Victorino met with Burrow on August 5. At this point, Burrow had the legal authority to conduct a "warrant-less" arrest on Victorino, and according to department officials should have done so. Instead, Victorino remained free. As a result, Hayes and Burrow were fired on August 9, along with two top administrators.

== Murders ==
Jonathan Gleason was on the recliner when the men stormed the house, and was fatally stabbed in the neck by Hunter. Victorino beat Francisco "Flaco" Ayo-Roman with an aluminum bat. Tito Gonzalez was murdered by Hunter, who fatally beat him in the head with a bat and stabbed him multiple times in the chest and stomach.

After Erin Belanger was beaten to death, Troy Victorino sexually abused her body. Anthony Vega was bludgeoned and stabbed in the throat by Victorino in the master bedroom near his girlfriend, Michelle Ann Nathan, who hid in a closet until discovered by Hunter who bludgeoned and stabbed her to death.

Belanger's pet dachshund, George, was intentionally stomped to death during the attack.

== Trial and sentencing ==
The month-long jury trial was moved from Volusia due to concerns that media coverage made a fair jury trial impossible, and was moved 85 miles (137 km) to the Richard O. Watson Judicial Center in St. Augustine, Florida, after two years of preparation. The $1.5 million in legal defense fees were a 7th Circuit record.

The trial came to an end on August 2, 2006, when 7th Circuit Judge William Parsons sentenced Victorino and Hunter to death by lethal injection, and Cannon and Salas to life in prison without the possibility of parole. Victorino and Hunter were carrying out their sentences in one-person cells on death row at the Union Correctional Institution in Raiford, Florida. However, on June 14, 2017, the Daytona Beach News-Journal reported that Victorino and Hunter were to receive new sentencing hearings due to a state Supreme Court decision that requires unanimity of jurors in recommending death. Prosecutors decided to seek death sentences for the two men again, and on November 3, 2025, both Hunter and Victorino were resentenced to death.

Victorino was found guilty of first-degree murder of all six victims, abuse of a dead human body, armed burglary of a dwelling, and animal cruelty. At trial, he claimed he was drinking at a bar when the murders occurred. Victorino contended that the size-12 bloody boots presented at trial were his, someone must have stolen them from him before committing the murders.

Hunter was also found guilty of first-degree murder of all six victims, conspiring to commit aggravated battery, tampering with physical evidence, abuse of a dead human body, and armed burglary of a dwelling. He closed his eyes as the first "guilty" verdict was read, and stared straight ahead as he was further condemned to death. Hunter was at one point the youngest inmate on death row in Florida. A September 2008 appeal by Hunter was rejected.

Cannon pleaded guilty and was sentenced to six life terms without parole for the murders, life for armed burglary of a dwelling with a weapon, five years for conspiracy to commit aggravated battery, murder, armed burglary of a dwelling and tampering with physical evidence, 15 years each for five counts of abuse of a dead human body, and five years for cruelty to an animal.

Salas was found guilty of first-degree murder of all six victims, conspiring to commit aggravated battery, tampering with physical evidence, and armed burglary of a dwelling.

== Victims ==
Belanger, Ayo-Roman, Nathan, and Vega were four friends who worked together at Burger King and rented the Telford Lane home. Gleason was not a resident at the home; Gonzalez was another co-worker who was spending the night. George was Belanger's pet dachshund.

Originally from Nashua, New Hampshire, Belanger moved to Deltona in 2004 to help take care of her grandmother's winter home. She met Troy Victorino in Deltona, Florida while she was working at a Burger King as a cook. Ayo-Roman, Belanger's new boyfriend and co-worker, grew up in Puerto Rico. He moved to Florida to finish school and obtain his nursing certification.

Vega, a painter and construction worker, moved to Florida from The Bronx, New York. He moved into the three-bedroom Telford Lane house two weeks prior to the slaying.

Nathan, Vega's girlfriend, said she wanted to marry Vega and was very excited about living on her own. Her parents considered her a princess, and she had a tattoo of a princess on her arm. After her death, her father got the same tattoo on his arm.

Tito Gonzalez moved from Inwood, Manhattan to Florida in 2004.

Gleason, originally from Deltona, was the only person living in the home who did not work at the Burger King; however, he had filled out an application. He spoke Spanish, Portuguese, and French, and was planning to volunteer at a medical clinic in Africa. People that personally knew him described him as a very intelligent, funny, loving guy who loved people, and often performed in plays, and even dabbled in dance.

== Murderers ==
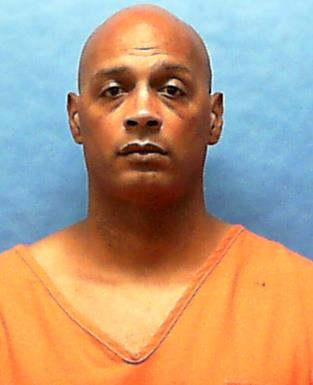
Troy Victorino

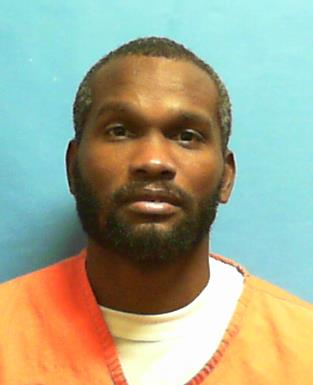
Jerone Hunter

The attackers share two commonalities: a degree of mental illness and troubled, unstable upbringings.

Troy Victorino (born December 11, 1976), the ringleader of the attack, was on probation at the time of the murder. Victorino had been jailed many times for assault and was incarcerated for eight of the eleven years prior to the massacre. Born in the Jamaica neighborhood in Queens, New York, Victorino had a history of childhood abuse ranging from beatings with belt buckles and sexual abuse beginning at age 2. Medical experts testified that his scarred mental development and brain damage left him with an inability to control his impulses. Witnesses that grew up near him and his brother could confirm the instability in that house: there were drugs, violence and abuse, and a general lack of parental unity or care.

Michael Salas' upbringing was on record by child protective services, and he and his brothers were determined to have been exposed to violence, drug-use, malnourishment, and abuse such as cigarette burns by their mother. His father Roberto died of AIDS when Michael was 9. Michael, who has several diagnosed mental disorders including bipolar disorder, dropped out of school in ninth grade.

Jerone Hunter (born May 31, 1986) was a clinically depressed, mentally ill man whose parents were both committed to mental hospitals at the time of the massacre. As early as age 3, Hunter would converse with his identical twin brother Jeremy, who died from pneumonia at 6 months old. His mother did not seek medical attention for his abnormal behavior because she thought it was common and reasoned, "in the black culture, I was told when they have a twin brother and they pass away, they always have that relationship with him, so I never thought it was strange." Hunter's rejected August 2008 appeal claimed he has schizophrenia who was forced into the slayings by Victorino and therefore should have been tried separately.

== Legislative response ==
In response to the Deltona massacre, the Florida legislature proposed a bill that would add additional "risk-to-public" hearings for probation violators with violent histories. State law allowed, but did not require, probation officer Richard Burrow to arrest Troy Victorino, a violent felon who was facing a battery charge and thus probation violation. Burrow opted to let Victorino leave his office and to ask for an arrest warrant the next day, which gave Victorino the opportunity to commit the killings.

The bill, SB-146, which passed on February 23, 2007, seeks to close this loophole by addressing felony probation and other community control violations with the new designation, "violent felony offenders of special concern" (VFOSC). Such an offender cannot be released from jail until a court hearing determines whether supervision was violated. If supervision is found to have been violated, the court must make a written finding as to whether the offender is a danger to the community. If determined to be a danger to the community, the violator may have his probation revoked and be sentenced up to the statutory maximum or longer if permitted by law. The bill substantially amends sections 921.0024 and 948.06, Florida Statutes; creates sections 903.0351 and 948.064, Florida Statutes; and reenacts sections 948.012(2)(b), 948.10(9), and 958.14, Florida Statutes.

== See also ==
- List of death row inmates in the United States § Florida
