= 1976 Mason County jail bombing =

1976 suicide bombing in West Virginia, United States

Coordinates: 38.8443°N 82.1378°W

- Location: Mason County Courthouse; Point Pleasant, West Virginia, U.S.
- Date: March 2, 1976; 50 years ago 10:50 p.m. EDT (UTC-04:00)
- Attack type: Suicide attack
- Weapons: Dynamite; Sawed-off shotgun
- Deaths: 6 (including 2 perpetrators and their baby days prior)
- Injuries: 11
- Perpetrators: Bruce Sisk, Harriet Sisk

The 1976 Mason County jail bombing was a suicide bombing that took place at the Mason County Courthouse in Point Pleasant, West Virginia on March 2, 1976. Five people, including two perpetrators and three law enforcement officers, were killed in the attack, and a further 11 people were injured. The bombing was perpetrated by 19-year-old Bruce Sisk, who detonated a suitcase filled with dynamite in his wife's jail cell after forcing his way in using a sawed-off shotgun.

18-year-old Harriet Sisk had been held in the jail, which was in the basement of the courthouse, awaiting trial after confessing to strangling her 2-month-old child to death. She had entered a suicide pact with Bruce prior to the bombing.

== Background ==
=== Murder of Davi Calline Sisk ===
In the early hours of February 28, 1976, Harriet Sisk reported to police that her 2-month-old daughter, Davi Calline Sisk, had gone missing and suggested she may have been abducted from their mobile home. An extensive search followed, which resulted in the discovery of Davi's body in a shallow grave located a short distance from the home. Davi's body was wrapped, alongside a rag doll, with 3 blankets.

On February 29, Harriet confessed to causing the death of Davi and on March 1 an autopsy revealed that Davi had been strangled to death and beaten. Harriet Sisk would subsequently be arrested by Sheriff Elvin Wedge on suspicion of murder and held in the Mason County jail while awaiting trial. During this time, Harriet confessed to the murder and claimed that Bruce had assisted her in burying the corpse of the child and filing the police report.

A funeral was held on March 1 for Davi Calline Sisk, which both Bruce and Harriet were permitted to attend despite her arrest.

=== Day of the bombing ===
Harriet Sisk's cellmate, Alice Missen, stated that on March 2, Bruce had visited the jail prior to the bombing and had a 10-minute whispered conversation with his wife. She would later recall that when Bruce returned to enact his attack, he said "Well here I am. I told you I'd be back."

A friend of Bruce, Calvin Engle, who claimed to have spent much of the day of March 2 with him, described Bruce's emotional state, saying "It was the day after his daughter's funeral and he was still pretty uptight. But I didn't detect any anger,... just sadness."

== Bombing ==
On March 2, 1976, at approximately 10:50 pm, Bruce Sisk entered the Mason County jail armed with a stolen sawed-off shotgun and a suitcase that contained at least 15 pounds of dynamite. Sisk encountered unarmed dispatcher and jailer Charles Keith Anson and held him at gunpoint, demanding to be let into his wife's cell to spend the night. Anson recognized Sisk, who had visited the jail earlier at around 6 pm and talked to his wife, and had apparently gotten upset when Anson informed him visiting hours were over. Sisk pressed the barrel of the shotgun into Anson's back as he was led to his wife's cell. Anson unlocked the cell door and once Sisk entered, he slammed the cell door shut and locked it, locking Bruce, Harriet, and Harriet's cellmate, Alex Sue Missen, inside.

Anson returned upstairs and called for backup and soon numerous law enforcement officers arrived at the scene. Negotiations were attempted with the couple, but they refused to respond. Eventually, the couple released Missen, at Harriet's insistence, from the cell, who State Trooper Lloyd Akers claimed told him that "The only thing they told me to tell you was to have the building clear by morning or you'll be sorry." This prompted officers to begin the evacuation of the jail, but before it could be completed the suitcase bomb was detonated at approximately 11:20 pm.

The explosion instantly killed the Sisk couple and Deputy Kenneth Ward Love and resulted in extensive damage to the jail, courthouse, and surrounding buildings. Sheriff Elvin Wedge would die hours later and Deputy Earnest Hesson would die of his injuries a week later. In total, five were killed and eleven were wounded in the bombing.

Witnesses report that the bomb completely destroyed the jail. The courthouse and surrounding buildings had their windows blown out by the blast. It was reported that many of the dead and injured were buried under debris and that the explosion tore a hole into the second floor, resulting in prisoners on that floor falling through into the basement. Cpl. J.L Fitzwater described the explosion, stating "It just demolished the jail. It blew a hole in the side of the building and shattered windows on every floor and in surrounding buildings. It was just a tremendous blast. It ripped steel doors off like they were paper." Some officials feared the building would collapse after witnessing the damages. It was estimated that the explosion caused $500,000 in damages.

== Victims ==
=== Killed ===
- Bruce Sisk, 19 (Perpetrator)
- Harriet Sisk, 18 (Perpetrator)
- Kenneth Love, 33 (Deputy)
- Elvin "Pete" Wedge, 48 (Sheriff)
- Ernest Hesson, 71 (Deputy)

=== Injured ===
Though 11 injured is the consistently reported number, only 10 have ever been named.

- Lloyd Akers, 33 (State trooper)
- Tom Belcher, 34 (City patrolman)
- Richard Dyer, 47 (Deputy)
- Donald Little, 40 (Prisoner)
- Noah McDade, 52 (Prisoner)
- Alice Missen, 18 (Prisoner)
- Danny Missen, 27 (Prisoner)
- Terry Pierce, 18 (Prisoner)
- Mike Smith, 30 (State trooper)
- Bruce Wallace, 28 (Ohio highway patrolman)

== Investigation ==
Officers carried out searches of the Sisk home and interviewed approximately 50 people during the course of the investigation. Forensic analysis of the crime scene revealed that the bomb contained at least 15 pounds of dynamite and had been detonated by an electronic blasting cap and 1½ volt, D-cell flashlight battery, and not by Bruce Sisk shooting it with the shotgun, as originally thought. The investigation found that Bruce had not fired the shotgun at all during the attack.

Based on Harriet's confession, a suicide note discovered at the Sisk home and witness testimony, the investigation concluded that the attack was part of a suicide pact between the Sisk couple. The dynamite used in the bomb was stolen by Bruce Sisk from a construction company he had worked for in the past, and the stolen shotgun was linked to a burglary in mid-February. Evidence was found that Bruce exhibited animosity towards police officers and referred to them as "pigs" and other derogatory names.

== Aftermath ==
Around 11 months after the explosion, the Mason County Commission signed a contract to rebuild the jail, which was destroyed in the explosion. A memorial to the victims was placed outside the jail.

The Sisk's other child, 18-month-old Michaell Sisk, was taken in by the Department of Welfare.
