= 1987 Palm Bay shooting =

Mass shooting in Palm Bay, Florida, U.S.

- Approximate location of the shooting
- Location: 28.033150°N 80.621893°W; Palm Bay, Florida, United States
- Date: April 23, 1987; 39 years ago c. 6:00 p.m. - 1:56 a.m. (EDT)
- Attack type: Mass shooting, mass murder
- Weapons: Ruger Mini-14 semi-automatic rifle 12-gauge shotgun.357 Magnum revolver
- Deaths: 6
- Injuries: 14 (10 by gunfire)
- Perpetrator: William Bryan Cruse Jr.

On April 23, 1987, a mass shooting occurred in Palm Bay, Florida, United States, when 59-year-old retired librarian William Bryan Cruse Jr. opened fire outside a shopping mall, killing six people, including two police officers, and injuring 14 others before being captured by police in the early hours of the following day. Cruse was sentenced to death for the crime but died on death row in 2009 of natural causes before his execution could be carried out. The incident is the worst mass shooting in Brevard County history.

== Shooting ==
Just before 6:00 p.m. on April 23, 1987, Cruse confronted two boys on his Palm Bay property. He then loaded his car, a white Toyota Tercel, with a shotgun, a pistol, and a Ruger Mini-14 semi-automatic rifle. As he drove in the direction of Palm Bay Shopping Center, he stopped at his neighbor's house. He then opened fire with his shotgun on 14-year-old Johnny Rich, one of the two boys he had confronted earlier, wounding him. Rich's family rushed outside and were shot at by Cruse as he drove off.

At 6:15 p.m. Cruse drove into the parking lot of Palm Bay Shopping Center. He exited his vehicle armed with the Ruger and walked towards a Publix grocery store. Two shoppers, 25-year-old Nobil Al-Hameli and 18-year-old Enud Al-Tawakuly, were exiting the store as Cruse approached them. Cruse shot and killed both of them and wounded their friend Faisal Al-Mutairi. He then fired at passerby Douglas Pollack as he ran along the walkway of the shopping mall. Cruse shot Eric Messerbauer, who was in front of a nearby store, and then shot and killed 67-year-old Ruth Greene as she parked in front of the grocery store. Cruse then shot Al-Hameli and Al-Tawakuly again as they lay on the ground.

Cruse returned to his car and drove across the street to Sabal Palm Square. He parked in front of a Winn-Dixie grocery store, exited his vehicle, and began firing again. As Cruse started shooting, 27-year-old Ronald Grogan, a Palm Bay police officer, approached the scene in his patrol car. As Grogan approached, Cruse turned towards him and fired 8 rounds at Grogan's patrol car, killing him. Another Palm Bay police officer, 28-year-old Gerald Johnson, also entered the parking lot behind Grogan and exited his patrol car. Cruse spotted Johnson and shot him in the leg. He then walked through the parking lot in search of Johnson. He found him and fired several more shots, killing him.

A rescue team arrived and attempted to save Grogan from being within Cruse's vision. Cruse opened fire on the rescue team and yelled "Where is the cop? Get away from the cop! I want the cop to die." Cruse then entered the Winn-Dixie grocery store and went to the back of the building. He noticed shoppers were trying to exit through the rear door and began firing at them as they attempted to escape. Cruse wounded multiple people and fatally shot 52-year-old Lester Watson in the back. Cruse found two women, Judy Larson and Robin Brown, hiding in the women's restroom. Instead of killing them, he told Larson to go outside and inform the police to turn off the lights in the building. He kept Brown, an employee of the store, as a hostage.

Cruse tried negotiating with the police and ordered them to bring his car to the back of the store to allow him to drive out of Palm Bay. He told police he would then allow them to kill him once he was outside Brevard County, however, the police rejected his demands. At 1:10 a.m. on the morning of April 24, Cruse allowed Brown to leave. Minutes later, police fired tear gas and stun grenades into the store. At 1:56 a.m. Cruse was captured alive when police found him lying in a prone position in the southwest corner of the store. Several customers who had locked themselves in a freezer were then freed unharmed. At 3:30 a.m. Palm Bay police announced that in total six people had been killed and 14 others had been injured during the shooting. Cruse was arrested and taken to Palm Bay police station.

During the attack, Cruse used the 3-shot drill on his victims, would enter and leave cover while firing, and was noted to attack his victims in an emotionless, calm manner, with one witness describing Cruse's actions as "it looked as if he were shooting Skeet."

== Perpetrator ==
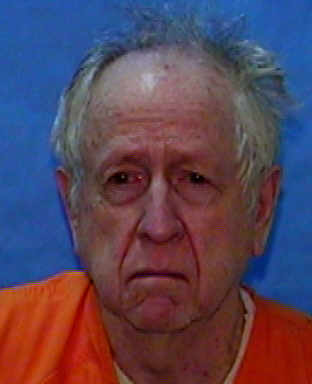
Mugshot of Cruse

William Bryan Cruse Jr. (November 21, 1927 – November 29, 2009) was a retired librarian from Kentucky. In the 1930s, his father, William Cruse Sr., lost his job as a railway brakeman, so he opened his own restaurant, which was successful, but Cruse Jr.'s parents eventually divorced. In 1949, Cruse Sr. opened fire with a shotgun at the house of the Irvine prosecutor who had shut down his restaurant for liquor and gambling violations. Windows were shattered, but no one was wounded or killed. Cruse Sr. was captured the next day and spent five years in prison.

In 1978, in Lexington, South Carolina, Cruse Jr. shot someone whom he believed was about to attack him and his mother, Dora Cruse. The victim, Ronald Gene Smith, was shot in the elbow and grazed on the temple. No charges were filed; Cruse paid a $257 fine and was given 60 days of probation. In 1980, Dora Cruse died. In 1985, Cruse moved to Palm Bay with his wife, who was sick and suffered from Parkinson's disease. Neighbors of Cruse thought he was scary, ornery, and maybe a little crazy. He had once exited his house carrying guns and fired shots into the air. Children in his neighborhood said he shouted obscenities and grabbed his crotch in gestures at them.

In the weeks before the shooting, Cruse had been taunted by children in his neighborhood, whom he often argued with. An indecency report had been filed against him. Cruse, who hated homosexuals, later told investigators that employees of one of the grocery stores he had targeted thought he was gay. Cruse told police after his capture that he "got into trouble" because everyone thought he was homosexual. He said that he was trying to get even with people who taunted him and that he had been "drunk and crazy" during the shooting.

== Victims ==
The six victims who were killed were identified as:

- Nobil Al-Hameli, 25
- Enud Al-Tawakuly, 18
- Ruth Greene, 67
- Ronald Grogan, 27, Palm Bay police officer
- Gerald Johnson, 28, Palm Bay police officer
- Lester Watson, 52

== Aftermath ==
=== Cruse's trial ===
Cruse was charged with first-degree murder, attempted murder, kidnapping, and false imprisonment. On April 5, 1989, Cruse was convicted of first-degree murder, attempted murder, and kidnapping.

On July 28, 1989, Cruse was sentenced to death in the electric chair for the murders of Grogan and Johnson, the two police officers killed in the shooting. He was sentenced to 100 years in prison without parole for the other four murders.

The jury had recommended that Cruse be sentenced to death on each of the six counts of first-degree murder, however, the judge only sentenced Cruse to death for two counts of first-degree murder, which were for the murders of the two police officers. His reasons for doing so were that he accepted the defense's argument that Cruse had "severe mental disturbance" which lessened the penalties for the murders of the four civilians. He added that it was not because these particular victims were police officers that Cruse received death sentences but rather how Cruse murdered them, which carried aggravating factors, as Cruse was very deliberate in taking actions to make certain that those particular victims died.

The judge rejected Cruse's insanity defense. Cruse also received 26 other convictions for attempted murder, kidnapping, and false imprisonment. Cruse's total prison sentence was 103 years. In total, he was convicted of 32 charges.

=== Cruse's death ===
On November 29, 2009, Cruse died in prison of natural causes before his execution could be carried out. He was 82 years old at the time of his death.

== See also ==
- List of rampage killers in the United States
