= 1996 Jackson firehouse shooting =

Mass shooting in Mississippi, US

- Location: 32.2948°N 90.1854°W; Jackson, Mississippi, US
- Date: April 24, 1996
- Attack type: Mass murder, mass shooting
- Weapons: 9mm Intratec TEC-9 semi-automatic pistol; 9mm Cobray MAC-11/9 semi-automatic rifle; .45-caliber semi-automatic pistol
- Deaths: 5 (including the perpetrator's wife at home)
- Injuries: 3
- Perpetrator: Kenneth Tornes
- Motive: Revenge
- Verdict: Death
- Convictions: Capital murder

The 1996 Jackson firehouse shooting was a mass murder that took place on April 24, 1996, at a firehouse in Jackson, Mississippi, United States. 32-year-old firefighter Kenneth Tornes fatally shot four of his supervisors, after killing his wife earlier that day.

== Event ==
Early in the morning of April 24, 1996, Tornes went to the home of his estranged wife Glenda, 42. Neighbors heard gunshots, but weren't alarmed until they spotted Tornes washing blood off of himself in the home's carport.

As police approached the home, Tornes set out for fire department headquarters. He passed a coworker shouting "Lady, get back, I am going to blow the place up!" He was armed with a rifle and walked from office to office, killing four supervisors and wounding two others.

Tornes felt slighted by department officials, who had recently reprimanded Tornes multiple times, which Tornes felt were undeserved. The firefighters' union chief said Tornes was "a time bomb waiting to go off". Other coworkers expressed expectancy: "He's been talking about this for years... I'm surprised it took so long." Tornes specifically targeted his superiors; Tornes walked past one coworker who pleaded for his life, and told another to get themselves and their fire-dog out of the way.

Tornes victims were: Captain Merideth Moree, 49; District Chief Willie Dwight Craft, 48; Captain Stanley Adams, 45; and District Chief John "Rick" Robbins, 47.

After departing the fire station, Tornes led police officers on a high-speed chase to the parking lot of a nearby shopping center in Ridgeland, Mississippi. Tornes wounded one officer in a shootout before being shot in his left eye. He recovered, and was eventually tried and convicted for the slayings. He was sentenced to death on April 3, 1998, but died of a blood clot on death row on April 9, 2000, at the age of 36.

== Perpetrator ==
Kenneth Tornes (March 8, 1964 - April 9, 2000) was a Jackson, Mississippi, native, who neighbors and childhood friends had generally referred to as competent at his job. He was seen as broadly likable, though prone to mood shifts. Friends recalled his preoccupation with physical fitness, and his affinity for cartoons and The Terminator. Those who knew him noted his propensity for violent mood swings, and an irascibility that had reached fever pitch in the days before the shooting. Weeks before, white supremacist Larry Shoemake had shot multiple people at a Jackson mall, killing one, DQ Holifield (51). Tornes joined the discussion to say that someone might do something that drastic to the fire department soon. In the leadup, a neighbor described him as "like a nut" and "real moody". Police were called to the ex-couple's shared home on a domestic violence call, but no charges resulted.

Tornes is also a suspect in the triple murder of Victoria Minor (18), her 2-week-old son Howard Minor and her boyfriend Clarence Harper Jr. (22) that occurred in Jackson on October 4, 1994. According to officials, ballistics matched one of the guns used by Tornes to the 1994 triple murders.
