= Carl Robert Brown =

American mass murderer

- Born: November 26, 1930; Chicago, Illinois, U.S.
- Died: August 20, 1982 (aged 51); Miami, Florida, U.S.
- Cause of death: Gunshot wounds
- Occupation: Teacher
- Motive: Bill for and quality of lawnmower engine, traveler's check refused by office staff

Details
- Date: August 20, 1982 c. 11:00 a.m.
- Locations: Miami, Florida, U.S.
- Killed: 8
- Injured: 3
- Weapon: Ithaca 37 12 gauge pump-action shotgun

Carl Robert Brown (November 26, 1930 – August 20, 1982) was an American teacher and mass murderer who fatally shot eight people and injured another three in a Miami welding shop on August 20, 1982. He was later fatally shot by two witnesses while cycling away from the scene.

== Biography ==
Brown was born on November 26, 1930, in Chicago, Illinois. He joined the U.S. Navy and was honorably discharged in 1954. People later stated that Brown always kept a military bearing about himself and was quite militaristic. In 1955, he moved from Chicago to Florida, where he graduated from the University of Miami in 1957 and in 1964 from East Carolina College in Greenville, North Carolina, earning a master's degree in education. After working briefly for Keyes Realty, he got a full-time job as a history teacher at Hialeah Junior High School in 1962 and moonlighted at Miami-Dade Community College as an accounting instructor from 1964 to 1970.

Brown was married twice and had three children. His first wife died and his second marriage failed, according to his second wife, Sylvia, because he refused to seek psychological help. As a consequence, his condition began to deteriorate, resulting in an increasingly disheveled and gaunt appearance, and, though once being a rather gregarious person, he began isolating himself more and more. A neighbor later described him looking "as if he were 80 years old". Reportedly, one of his daughters once tried to have him hospitalized, though as his admission had to be voluntary, her request was declined. Additionally, his career began to suffer. At Hialeah Junior High, Brown was an alleged bigot who hated everyone, and was transferred to Drew Middle School, a school with a black majority, in 1981. There he taught American history until March 3, 1982, when he was relieved of his teaching duties for medical leave to treat his psychiatric problems.

Though neighbors described Brown as a quiet, kind and helpful man, who was working hard to keep his duplex neat and clean, and praising him overall as a landlord, it was also said that he made a habit of walking into other people's yards early in the morning, waking them by yelling "United States!" and that during the night, shots were heard from his house. It was also reported that he once broke a window when firing a pellet gun, and picked grapefruit from a neighbor's tree wearing only his underwear. Apparently, he also collected aluminum cans.

After a trip abroad, which he had taken shortly before the shooting, he came back in worse shape than before and stated that nothing in the United States stood for anything.

=== School problems ===
While Brown wrote in his application for a job as a teacher in 1961 that he "always enjoyed being with younger people" and felt that he "could benefit these younger people with his abilities", his work began to suffer as his psychological problems aggravated over the years. Being seen as a competent teacher for a long time, more and more complaints were filed against him as his condition worsened. Students began to refuse to sit in his class as he rambled incoherently about his personal problems and topics unrelated to his curriculum and conducted confusing conversations where he strung together completely unrelated things. Students would often take advantage of this by asking him a question that resulted in him talking for the rest of the period. On one occasion, on May 5, 1977, Brown sent three girls to detention because they refused to sit in his class, as they were "sick and tired of hearing him talk." He was also known to be very prejudiced, to make threatening remarks, and to insult people of other races.

During his time at Hialeah Junior High, Brown wrote a letter to the principal for "the enlightenment of the assistant principals," discussing the misbehavior of his students in rambling and poorly constructed sentences. "I don't read the students their rights as infants, you all do...If you ever study business law, until a child is 18, the child can do just about anything the child desires to do and get away with the abuse. Any adult interfering, is accountable as an adult, but with infancy laws, the child is a child."

In the summer of 1981, Brown was transferred to Drew Middle School. There, on December 3, he had a dispute with two students, whom he accused of throwing books. During the argument, Brown described his sexual behavior with a girlfriend and chased the boys with a stapler. The school board's director of personnel control, Pat Gray, described this as "a classroom incident...wherein Mr. Brown demonstrated a significant lack of adult judgment, an overtone of sexual fixation, and definitive aggression toward students." The school's principal wrote: "I found Mr. Brown to be incoherent and unable to grasp the severity of the situation at hand. I, also, fear for the safety of the students since during my conference with Mr. Brown he demonstrated no regret for his actions pointing to the fact that he is a 'man' and any man would have reacted in the same manner."

Principal Octavio Visiedo wrote in his last evaluation of Brown: "I find Mr. Brown to be a negative force. Today I did a follow-up observation of Mr. Brown's second-period class and I continue to be alarmed about the potential for disaster in that class. As you can see, from today's observation, there is absolutely no discipline or control in that class and I am concerned for the safety of the students and also Mr. Brown." Further, he stated that Brown's class was in "total and complete chaos", with students talking constantly, wandering about at will, and leaving without permission.

Brown reacted by writing a response in which he suggested that the principal "should seek the help" of the school board's employee assistance program, to which he himself was referred to in January 1982.

Psychiatrist Dr. Robert A. Wainger examined Brown, saying that "Mr. Brown is suffering from rather severe anxiety associated with some paranoid and grandiose ideas" and that he also "demonstrates a probable thinking disorder". Though Wainger wrote that these symptoms would affect Brown's work, he was also of the opinion that he would be able to continue teaching if given psychotherapy and medication. Wainger also wrote that "although he may appear to be rather unusual and disorganized to the people around him, he (Brown) does not represent a danger to either."

After his examination, Brown wrote to Wainger: "I wish to thank you for the very interesting and informative meeting I experienced yesterday. Please stress blood analysis, heart cartograph [sic] and urine plus the other mental health features of your program." Finally, on March 3, Brown was relieved of his duties to seek psychiatric help and he agreed to seek further treatment from Wainger, though in a meeting with Pat Gray, Brown apparently said: "Wainger wants to study me, that's all. I can cure Dr. Wainger. I will treat him. I will change his seeds."

According to his former wife, Sylvia, Brown asked to return to work two days prior to the shooting, but his psychiatrist, who later stated that Brown showed no aggressiveness at that time, declined his request.

== The shooting ==
Map of Bob Moore's welding shop indicating the positions of Brown's victims

On August 19, the day before the shooting, Brown had a heated argument with Jorge Castalleda, an employee at Bob Moore's Welding & Machine Service Inc., about a $20 bill for repairing a lawnmower engine he wanted to use to power his bicycle, saying the work was poorly done. He was also angry because his traveler's check was refused. Realizing that his complaints were of no avail, Brown left the shop, stating that he would come in and kill everybody; no one took him seriously.

Early the next day Brown went to a gun store a few blocks from his home in Hialeah and purchased two shotguns, a semi-automatic rifle and ammunition. An hour before starting his rampage, Brown invited his 10-year-old son to join him in "killing a lot of people" telling him that the final destination would be Hialeah Junior High School.

Shortly before 11:00 a.m. he arrived at the welding shop on his bicycle, wearing a Panama hat and carrying one of the shotguns, which was initially mistakenly identified as a 12 gauge Mossberg 500 Persuader but was later identified as an Ithaca 37 with a pistol grip, slung over his shoulder. He entered the shop through a side door and began shooting while yelling that he would send everybody to Germany. According to police, Brown walked through the building methodically shooting everyone, most of the time at close range and sometimes twice, leaving three victims in the office and others in the work area and the driveway in front of the shop. In the end, six of the eleven employees present were dead and two more dying, while three who were injured managed to escape and jump into the car of a passing motorist, who took them to a gas station a mile away and called for help. Out of ammunition, Carl Brown left the store, got back on his bicycle and started cycling away, apparently towards Hialeah Junior High School. According to a witness, Brown "looked very passive and very nonchalant" and "wasn't trying to escape, just casually leaving the crime scene." Another witness put it this way: "He got on his bike and pedaled off as if he was going for a stroll on North River Drive."

When Mark Kram, an employee at a nearby metal shop, was told of the massacre, he grabbed a .38 revolver and set out to pursue the shooter in his car. Down the street he picked up Ernest Hammett, who was trying to flag down cars, and together they tried to find the perpetrator. Six blocks away from the crime scene, near Miami International Airport, they caught up with Brown, and Kram, according to himself, fired a warning shot "over his (Brown's) head", though the bullet hit Brown in the back and later proved to be the cause of his death. When Brown turned in his saddle, aiming at his pursuers with his shotgun, they ran him over, crashing him into a concrete light pole. Brown, who still had 20 shells in his pockets, died shortly afterward.

== Victims ==
=== Killed ===
- Nelson Barrios, 46, welder
- Lonie Jeffries, 53, crane operator
- Carl Lee, 47, manager
- Ernestine Moore, 67, the machine shop owner's mother
- Mangum Moore, 78, the machine shop owner's uncle
- Martha Steelman, 29, secretary
- Juan Ramon Trespalacios, 38, machinist
- Pedro Vasques, 44, shop foreman

=== Wounded ===
- Eduardo Lima, 30
- Carlos Vazquez Sr., 42
- Carlos Vazquez Jr., 17

== Aftermath ==
Following the shooting Robert Steelman, whose wife Martha was among the dead, filed lawsuits against the Garcia Gun Center, where Brown had purchased his weapons, and the Ithaca Gun Company, the manufacturer of the shotgun used by Brown in his rampage.

Police found a cassette tape in Brown's house, where he called himself "Logos", a mythical figure he considered to be the controlling principle of the universe - "This is the Logos speaking. God through me is responsible for the good and bad sounds in your head." "Now I shall say a few good words in your head before I return you to the bad sounds in your head...The Logos is the spark of God, the most logical. I am indestructible on Earth."

No charges were filed against Kram.

== See also ==
- List of rampage killers in the United States

== Bibliography ==
- Bustos, Sergio & Yanez, Luisa: Miami's Criminal Past Uncovered; Charleston, SC, United States: History Press (2007) ISBN 978-1-59629-388-5 (pp 65–76)
