= Hamilton Avenue murders =

2006 mass murder in Indianapolis, Indiana, US

- Location: 39.77626°N 86.12512°W; 560 N Hamilton Ave; Indianapolis, Indiana
- Date: June 1, 2006
- Attack type: Mass shooting
- Deaths: 7
- Injuries: 0
- Convicted: James Stewart; Desmond Turner

The Hamilton Avenue murders is the colloquial name for the mass murder of seven people in a house at 560 North Hamilton Avenue in Indianapolis, Indiana, on June 1, 2006.

== Incident ==
According to the television program America's Most Wanted, the Indianapolis Police Department responded to a 911 call just after 10:00 p.m. They found seven dead victims, three of whom were children. The victims were shot with a military-style weapon, police charged. Evidence technicians recovered 23 discharged 7.62x39mm cartridge casings from the scene. These cartridges accommodate high velocity bullets used in AK-47 and SKS-type rifles. The murder weapon(s) were never found.

Witnesses said two suspects were seen entering the house shortly before the murders were believed to have taken place. Flora Albarran arrived with a friend to pick up her son around 10:00 p.m. Albarran's brother, Magno, also arrived about the same time. Both noticed that the house lights were out, which they knew was odd. Flora and Magno Albarran entered the house, and Magno pulls a gun on the home invaders within. Witnesses said Flora screamed to her friend in the car not to come in, followed by gunshots. The suspects were seen leaving through the front door moments later.

The Coroner said that all the victims were shot more than once.

== Victims ==
The victims were identified as:

- Emma Valdez, 46
- Alberto Covarrubias, 56, Valdez's husband
- Flora Albarran, 22, Valdez's daughter
- Magno Albarran, 29, Valdez's son, Flora Albarran's brother
- Luis Albarran, 5, Flora Albarran's son
- David Covarrubias, 8, Valdez's son
- Alberto Covarrubias, 11, Valdez's son

== Perpetrators ==
Police identified the suspects as James Stewart, 30, and Desmond Turner, 28. A reported motive for the murders was both men were looking for cash and cocaine inside of a safe.

Stewart was arrested without incident the following day. Turner, who had finished a four-year stint in prison only six months before, was the subject of a widespread manhunt by local, state, and federal authorities. He was captured on June 3, two days after the murders, when he turned himself in without incident at a Hardee's restaurant on Indianapolis's east side.

Prosecutors charged Turner and Stewart with seven counts of murder, seven counts of felony murder, seven counts of criminal confinement, robbery, burglary, carrying a handgun without a license (Stewart), and unlawful possession of a firearm by a serious violent felon (Stewart). Prosecutors originally sought the death penalty against Turner, but eventually dropped that request and sought a sentence of life without parole in exchange for Turner agreeing to waive his right to a trial by jury and instead be tried before a judge only. Both suspects maintained their innocence, but Stewart's girlfriend claimed that he admitted his role in the shootings.

Prior to the trial, the jailers wanted Turner moved to a state prison due to him fighting guards, threatening guards and other jailed people, spitting on guards, having drug and alcohol contraband in his cell, and other such disruptive behavior, which caused him to have extra charges.

Turner was convicted of seven counts of felony murder, seven counts of criminal confinement, burglary, and robbery and was sentenced on November 20, 2009, to life imprisonment without parole plus 88 years. On September 28, 2011, the Indiana Supreme Court unanimously affirmed Turner's convictions and sentence in full.

Stewart was convicted of seven counts of felony murder, six counts of criminal confinement, robbery, burglary, carrying a handgun without a license, and being a habitual offender; he was sentenced on January 6, 2010, to 425 years in prison. On April 18, 2011, the Indiana Court of Appeals affirmed all of Stewart's convictions and sentences except for the robbery conviction and resulting four-year sentence, which it vacated because that conviction violated the constitutional protections against double jeopardy. The opinion left Stewart with a 425-year aggregate sentence. The Indiana Supreme Court denied a review of the Stewart appeal on September 28, 2011, the same day it rejected Turner's appeal.

== Aftermath ==
The house was set on fire in an arson attack on August 23, 2008. It was demolished on July 16, 2010.
