= List of mass shootings in the United States (1900–1999) =

Most notable mass shootings in the contiguous United States from 1900–1999
Most notable mass shootings in Alaska from 1900–1999
Most notable mass shootings in Hawaii from 1900–1999
Most notable mass shootings in Puerto Rico from 1900–1999
Most notable mass shootings in the United States Virgin Islands from 1900–1999

This is a list of notable mass shootings in the United States in the 20th century.

Mass shootings are incidents involving several victims of firearm-related violence. The precise inclusion criteria are disputed, and there is no broadly accepted definition. Only shootings that have Wikipedia articles of their own are included in this list. Detailed lists of shootings can be found per-year at their respective pages.

The Gun Violence Archive, a nonprofit research group that tracks shootings and their characteristics in the United States, defines a mass shooting as an incident in which four or more people, excluding the perpetrator(s), are shot in one location at roughly the same time. The Congressional Research Service narrows that definition further, only considering what it defines as "public mass shootings", and only considering victims as those who are killed, excluding any victims who survive. The Washington Post and Mother Jones use similar definitions, with the latter acknowledging that their definition "is a conservative measure of the problem", as many rampages with fewer fatalities occur. The crowdsourced Mass Shooting Tracker project uses a definition even looser than the Gun Violence Archive's definition: four people shot in one incident regardless of the circumstances.

Better documentation of mass shootings in the United States has occurred through independent and scholarly studies such as the Stanford University Mass Shootings in America Data Project.

== Definitions ==
There are varying definitions of a mass shooting. Listed roughly from most broad to most restrictive:

Stanford MSA Data Project: 3+ shot in one incident, at one location, at roughly the same time, excluding organized crime, as well as gang-related and drug-related shootings.
Mass Shooting Tracker: 4+ shot in one incident, at one location, at roughly the same time.
Gun Violence Archive/Vox: 4+ shot in one incident, excluding the perpetrator(s), at one location, at roughly the same time.
Mother Jones: 3+ shot and killed in one incident, excluding the perpetrator(s), at a public place, excluding gang-related killings.
The Washington Post: 4+ shot and killed in one incident, excluding the perpetrator(s), at a public place, excluding gang-related killings.
Congressional Research Service: 4+ shot and killed in one incident, excluding the perpetrator(s), at a public place, excluding gang-related killings, acts carried out that were inspired by criminal profit, and terrorism.

== List ==
=== 1990s ===
| Date | Location | Dead | Injured | Total | Description |
|---|---|---|---|---|---|
| December 31, 1999 | Tampa, Florida | 5 | 3 | 8 | 1999 Tampa hotel shooting: A 36-year-old hotel employee gunned down four of his co-workers at a hotel, then fled the scene and killed a woman during a carjacking after she refused to give up her car. Three others were wounded. |
| November 2, 1999 | Honolulu, Hawaii | 7 | 0 | 7 | 1999 Honolulu shooting: A service technician opened fire inside a Xerox building and killed seven people while an eighth escaped. The perpetrator then held thirty-five school children inside the Hawaii Nature Center before surrendering to police. |
| September 15, 1999 | Fort Worth, Texas | 8 (Note: Including the perpetrator or suspect) | 7 | 15 | Wedgwood Baptist Church shooting: During a concert in the church for teenagers, the perpetrator entered and shot and killed seven attendees and wounded seven others before committing suicide. |
| August 10, 1999 | Los Angeles, California | 1 | 5 | 6 | 1999 Los Angeles Jewish Community Center shooting: Affiliated with the Aryan Nations, the perpetrator killed one and wounded five when entering a Jewish community center. |
| July 27–29, 1999 | Stockbridge and Atlanta, Georgia | 10 | 13 | 23 | 1999 Atlanta day trading firm shootings: The perpetrator bludgeoned his wife and two children to death within the two days before he entered two separate Buckhead firms. There, he shot fellow traders, killing an additional nine and wounding thirteen, committing suicide afterwards. |
| July 2–4, 1999 | Chicago, Urbana, Springfield, Decatur, Illinois, and Bloomington, Indiana | 3 | 10 | 13 | 1999 Independence Day weekend shootings: Part of the Creativity Movement, the perpetrator killed former Northwestern University basketball coach Ricky Byrdsong and a Korean American Indiana University graduate student Won-Joon Yoon as well as wounding a black minister and nine Orthodox Jews before killing himself. |
| June 3, 1999 | Las Vegas, Nevada | 4 | 1 | 5 | Zane Floyd: The perpetrator killed four people and injured a fifth in an Albertson's supermarket before surrendering to police. |
| April 20, 1999 | Columbine, Colorado | 16 | 20 | 36 | Columbine High School massacre: Two students from the school shot and killed thirteen classmates and a teacher before committing suicide. |
| April 15, 1999 | Salt Lake City, Utah | 3 | 5 | 8 | 1999 Family History Library shooting: A man opened fire at Family History Library, a genealogy research facility operated by The Church of Jesus Christ of Latter-day Saints, killing a security guard and a patron and wounding five others before he was shot and killed by police. |
| November 29, 1998 | Muskegon, Michigan | 5 | 0 | 5 | Seth Privacky: An 18-year-old man shot and killed four family members and another person at their home. He was arrested shortly after. |
| September 11, 1998 | Crestview, Florida | 4 | 0 | 4 | Jeffrey Hutchinson: A man fatally shot his girlfriend and her children with a shotgun after an argument. |
| July 24, 1998 | Washington, D.C. | 2 | 3 | 5 | 1998 United States Capitol shooting: A schizophrenic man entered the United States Capitol, where he shot four people, two fatally, before being shot by police and taken into custody. |
| July 5, 1998 | Tacoma, Washington | 5 | 5 | 10 | Trang Dai massacre: Four gunmen entered the Trang Dai Cafe and opened fire, killing five diners and wounding five others. |
| May 21, 1998 | Springfield, Oregon | 4 | 25 | 29 | 1998 Thurston High School shooting: An expelled student targeted his parents and the school and killed four people and injured twenty-five others before being arrested. |
| May 18, 1998 | Hillsborough County & Pasco County, Florida | 5 | 4 | 9 | 1998 Florida police shootings: A man fatally shot his girlfriend's 4-year-old son before being taken into custody. The man then unlocked his handcuffs while in the backseat of a police cruiser, grabbed an officer's weapon, and then fatally shot the two officers in the front seat. The man was pursued by police, during which he killed another officer, injured two more officers and two truck drivers. The man then took a woman hostage inside a convenience store before dying by suicide. |
| April 24, 1998 | Edinboro, Pennsylvania | 1 | 3 | 4 | 1998 Parker Middle School dance shooting: A 14-year-old student opened fire and fatally shot a teacher and injured another and two students during an 8th grade dance, before being arrested. |
| March 25, 1998 | Jefferson County, Arkansas | 5 | 1 | 6 | Clay King Smith: A man shot and killed his girlfriend and four others, including two children. He was taken into custody after being shot in the arm during a standoff. |
| March 24, 1998 | Craighead County, Arkansas | 5 | 10 | 15 | 1998 Westside Middle School shooting: Two students aged 11 and 13, shot and killed four students and a teacher and injured ten others before being arrested. |
| December 4, 1997 | Santa Claus, Georgia | 4 | 0 | 4 | Daniels family murders: A man broke into a home and shot and killed a husband and wife and two of their children. After the murders, he kidnapped three of their daughters and later molested one. |
| December 3, 1997 | Bartow, Florida | 4 | 0 | 4 | Nelson Serrano: A man killed three former business partners at a manufacturing plant, as well as a visiting relative of two of the other victims. The suspect was convicted of murder and sentenced to death. |
| December 1, 1997 | West Paducah, Kentucky | 3 | 6 | 9 | 1997 Heath High School shooting: A 14-year-old student opened fire on a group of students praying before the school opened, killing three and injuring six before surrendering. |
| November 30, 1997 | Shelbyville, Tennessee | 4 | 0 | 4 | Daryl Holton: A man killed his three children and their half-sister with a semi-automatic rifle at his workplace. He surrendered to police shortly after. |
| November 13, 1997 | Channelview, Texas | 5 | 0 | 5 | Coy Wayne Wesbrook: A man killed five people with a rifle, including his ex-wife, at a party. The shooter was convicted of murder and executed by lethal injection in 2016. |
| October 1, 1997 | Pearl, Mississippi | 3 | 7 | 10 | 1997 Pearl High School shooting: The perpetrator shot and killed his mother, then drove to the high school and shot and killed two students and injured seven before being arrested. |
| September 15, 1997 | Aiken, South Carolina | 4 | 3 | 7 | Hastings Arthur Wise: The perpetrator shot seven people at a manufacturing factory of his former employer, killing four. The perpetrator was executed in 2005. |
| August 19, 1997 | Colebrook, New Hampshire, and Bloomfield, Vermont | 5 | 4 | 9 | Carl Drega: After killing two New Hampshire State troopers in a supermarket parking lot, a gunman drove to the office of a district judge, killing her and a newspaper editor who attempted to disarm him. Police pursued the gunman to Vermont, where he wounded four more police officers in a gunfight before being killed by police. |
| April 6, 1997 | Greene County, Tennessee | 3 | 1 | 4 | Lillelid murders: Six people kidnapped four family members and shot them alongside the road, killing three. |
| March 11, 1997 | Detroit, Michigan | 4 | 2 | 6 | 1997 Detroit shootings: An armed gunman opened fire killing three people and wounding two others in northeast Detroit before being killed by police. |
| February 28, 1997 | Los Angeles, California | 2 | 20 | 22 | North Hollywood shootout: Upon leaving a bank, two heavily armed bank robbers were confronted by the LAPD. The robbers proceeded to open fire on the police in an attempt to escape. During this attempt, both of the robbers got shot. Following this, one of them took his own life, while the other one was mortally wounded. Out of the 20 injured, 12 were police officers, and 8 were civilians. |
| February 23, 1997 | New York City, New York | 2 | 6 | 8 | 1997 Empire State Building shooting: A gunman opened fire on the observation deck of the Empire State Building, killing one and wounding six, before taking his own life. |
| February 19, 1997 | Bethel, Alaska | 2 | 2 | 4 | 1997 Bethel Regional High School shooting: A student shot and killed two people and wounded two others before surrendering to police. He was reportedly assisted by several students in learning how to shoot, and many knew about the shooting plans in advance. |
| November 14, 1996 | Wixom, Michigan | 1 | 3 | 4 | Wixom Assembly Plant shooting: A U.S. Army veteran opened fire inside the Ford factory Wixom Assembly Plant, killing a man and injuring three others, including two police officers. He was arrested and sentenced to life in prison without parole in April 1998 after a failed insanity defense. |
| September 25, 1996 | Huntsville, Alabama | 4 | 2 | 6 | Cell phone murders: Four people were shot to death by a group of three men due to a conflict over a stolen cell phone, and another two were wounded in the same attack. Two of the perpetrators, Joey Wilson and Nicholas Acklin, were sentenced to death while the third, Corey Johnson, served 15 years for the crime. |
| July 16, 1996 | Winona, Mississippi | 4 | 0 | 4 | Curtis Flowers: Four people were shot to death at a furniture store. Curtis Flowers, a former employee of the store, was convicted of the murders, but these were overturned due to racial bias. The fourth and fifth trials ended as mistrials, and a sixth trial found Flowers guilty, but this was overturned by the Supreme Court in 2019. In 2020, the Mississippi Attorney General announced she would not pursue a seventh trial against Flowers. |
| June 13, 1996 | Tucson, Arizona | 4 | 0 | 4 | 1996 Tucson murders: Two men robbed a firefighter union hall, killing four people. The two men had shot and killed two people and injured another at a smoke shop during another robbery the month prior. |
| April 24, 1996 | Jackson, Mississippi | 5 | 3 | 8 | 1996 Jackson firehouse shooting: A 32-year-old Firefighter fatally shot four of his supervisors at a firehouse; he previously killed his wife earlier that day. |
| February 2, 1996 | Moses Lake, Washington | 3 | 1 | 4 | 1996 Frontier Middle School shooting: A student shot and killed a teacher and two students and wounded another before being arrested. |
| December 19, 1995 | New York City, New York | 5 | 4 | 9 | 1995 Bronx shoe store shooting: A man shot five people to death in a shoe store in the Pelham Parkway section of The Bronx because the store didn't have the size of shoes he wanted. The gunman was then shot and injured by police before getting apprehended. |
| December 8, 1995 | New York City, New York | 1 | 4 | 5 | Freddy's Fashion Mart attack: A man entered a store, setting it on fire and wounding four customers with a revolver as they fled. Police found the gunman dead of a self-inflicted gunshot wound and seven employees dead from smoke inhalation. |
| October 27, 1995 | Fort Bragg, North Carolina | 1 | 18 | 19 | William Kreutzer Jr.: An Army sergeant opened fire on other soldiers with a rifle, killing one person and wounding eighteen others before being subdued and disarmed. |
| June 17–21, 1995 | Atlantic City & Monroe Township, New Jersey; New York City, New York | 7 | 3 | 10 | Darnell Collins: A man went on a spree shooting across two states, committing robberies and murders, resulting in the deaths of seven people and injuries to three others. |
| April 18, 1995 | Redding, Connecticut | 5 | 0 | 5 | Geoffrey Ferguson: A man drove a rental Ford Tempo from his home in North Carolina to Connecticut and killed five men following a rent dispute at a rental home the previous month, before setting his victims and the house on fire. |
| April 3, 1995 | Corpus Christi, Texas | 6 | 0 | 6 | 1995 Corpus Christi shooting: A man walked into Walter Rossler Co. and killed five people before turning the gun on himself. |
| March 21, 1995 | Montclair, New Jersey | 4 | 1 | 5 | 1995 Montclair post office shooting: A former post office employee killed four men, including two employees, and wounded another man in an armed robbery before stealing more than $5,000 and was arrested afterward. |
| December 30, 1994 | Brookline, Massachusetts | 2 | 5 | 7 | John Salvi: A man shot six people at a Planned Parenthood clinic before killing a woman at another facility. The gunman was captured in Norfolk, Virginia, the day after. |
| November 7, 1994 | Wickliffe, Ohio | 1 | 4 | 5 | 1994 Wickliffe Middle School shooting: A 37-year-old former student entered the building and shot and killed the custodian and wounded three other adults before he was arrested. |
| August 28, 1994 | Vinton, Virginia | 4 | 0 | 4 | Earl Bramblett: A close friend of a family attacked them, killing the parents and their two children, before setting the house on fire. |
| August 14, 1994 | Garfield Heights, Ohio | 2 | 2 | 4 | Harry Mitts Jr.: After an argument with his wife, a man fatally shot a neighbor in a racially motivated attack before engaging in a shootout with police, killing one officer and wounding two. |
| June 30, 1994 | Virginia Beach, Virginia | 4 | 0 | 4 | 1994 Virginia bar murders: An ex-employee of a bar and her boyfriend fatally shot four people during a robbery. |
| April 16, 1994 | Gadsden, Alabama | 3 | 1 | 4 | 1994 Popeyes shooting: The perpetrators shot and killed three employees and injured one during a robbery. |
| February 13, 1994 | Bucyrus, Ohio | 3 | 3 | 6 | Kevin Keith: A gunman shot and killed three people and wounded three others at an apartment complex. |
| December 14, 1993 | Aurora, Colorado | 4 | 1 | 5 | 1993 Aurora, Colorado shooting: The perpetrator shot and killed four employees and injured one in revenge for being fired from Chuck E. Cheese's. |
| December 7, 1993 | Garden City, New York | 6 | 19 | 25 | Long Island Rail Road shooting: A passenger opened fire on other passengers and killed six and wounded nineteen before being subdued by three passengers and arrested. |
| December 2, 1993 | Oxnard, California | 5 | 4 | 9 | 1993 Oxnard unemployment office shooting: An unemployed man opened fire inside aCalifornia Employment Development Department office, killing three people and injuring four others. After fleeing the scene, he fatally shot a police officer in Ventura before being killed in a shootout with police. |
| August 6, 1993 | Fayetteville, North Carolina | 4 | 8 | 12 | Luigi's Restaurant shooting: A soldier entered a restaurant and shot indiscriminately, killing four people and wounding seven others before being shot and wounded by an off-duty police officer. |
| July 24, 1993 | Cerro Gordo County, Iowa | 4 | 0 | 4 | 1993 Iowa murders: A man involved in the manufacturing of methamphetamine executed a dealer and his family after the dealer was set to testify against him. |
| July 1, 1993 | San Francisco, California | 10 | 5 | 15 | 101 California Street shooting: The perpetrator opened fire in an office building, killing nine people and wounding five others before committing suicide. |
| February 28, 1993 | McLennan County, Texas | 10 | 27 | 37 | Waco siege: The ATF attempted to execute a search warrant on the Mount Carmel Center near Waco, Texas. At some point, shots either came from inside the building or from the ATF, sparking a shootout that killed 4 ATF agents and 6 Branch Davidians, and wounded 16 ATF agents and 11 Branch Davidians. |
| January 25, 1993 | Langley, Virginia | 2 | 3 | 5 | 1993 CIA headquarters shooting: A Pakistani national fired an AK-47 style weapon at a line of cars waiting at a red light to turn into the main entrance of the CIA Headquarters. He was captured in 1997. |
| January 8, 1993 | Palatine, Illinois | 7 | 0 | 7 | Brown's Chicken massacre: Two robbers entered a Brown's Chicken restaurant and murdered seven employees. The two were arrested and convicted in 2007 and 2009. |
| December 14, 1992 | Great Barrington, Massachusetts | 2 | 4 | 6 | 1992 Bard College at Simon's Rock shooting: The perpetrator, Wayne Lo, had been stockpiling ammunition and weapons in his dorm, and after several alarms had been raised by third parties, he opened fire and killed a professor and student and wounded four others. |
| November 7–8, 1992 | Morro Bay/Paso Robles/San Miguel, California | 7 | 2 | 9 | 1992 San Luis Obispo County shootings: A man opened fire at three different locations across San Luis Obispo County, targeting specific people due to personal grievances. The man died by a self-inflicted gunshot wound. |
| November 1–2, 1992 | Rancho Santa Fe, California | 4 | 0 | 4 | Ian Stuart Spiro: A British man fatally shot his wife and children as they slept before dying by suicide via cyanide poisoning. |
| August 21–22, 1992 | near Naples, Idaho | 3 | 2 | 5 | Ruby Ridge standoff: U.S. marshals shot and killed the Weaver family's dog on August 21, sparking a shootout between the U.S. marshals, Samuel Weaver, and Kevin Harris, a family friend of the Weavers. U.S. marshals fatally shot Samuel, causing Harris to fatally shoot a U.S. marshal. The next day, a sniper shot Randall Weaver in the shoulder, before fatally shooting his wife, Vicki Weaver in the head. The same shot that killed Vicki would then get lodged in Harris' side. |
| June 20, 1992 | Houston, Texas | 4 | 2 | 6 | Brownstone Lane murders: The perpetrators shot and killed four people and injured two at a residence in Houston, Texas. |
| May 1, 1992 | Olivehurst, California | 4 | 10 | 14 | 1992 Lindhurst High School shooting: A 20-year-old past student opened fire on a classroom and killed four people, wounded ten others, and held eighty people hostage during an eight-hour siege before he surrendered. |
| December 6, 1991 | Austin, Texas | 4 | 0 | 4 | 1991 Austin yogurt shop murders: Four teenage girls were shot and killed at the Austin "I Can't Believe It's Yogurt!" shop. In 2025, Austin police posthumously identified the perpetrator as serial killer Robert Eugene Brashers. |
| November 14, 1991 | Royal Oak, Michigan | 5 | 4 | 9 | Royal Oak post office shooting: A gunman shot and killed four people and wounded four others at a post office before killing himself. |
| November 1, 1991 | Iowa City, Iowa | 6 | 1 | 7 | 1991 University of Iowa shooting: A former graduate student attended a meeting for a research group before opening fire and killed five individuals and injured one before committing suicide. |
| October 16, 1991 | Killeen, Texas | 24 | 27 | 51 | Luby's shooting: A former Merchant Marine drove his vehicle through the front window of the restaurant before opening fire on a crowd of about eighty people, killing twenty-three and injuring twenty-seven before committing suicide. |
| September 2, 1991 | Youngstown, Ohio | 4 | 0 | 4 | 1991 Youngstown shooting: A man, accompanied by three accomplices, tied up four people and shot them execution-style. |
| August 9–10, 1991 | Waddell, Arizona | 9 | 0 | 9 | Waddell Buddhist Temple shooting: Nine men were robbed and killed in a Buddhist temple, with the perpetrator remaining un-convicted until 2014. |
| June 16, 1991 | Denver, Colorado | 4 | 0 | 4 | Father's Day bank massacre: A bank robber killed four unarmed guards during a robbery. A retired police officer was arrested for the crime, but he was acquitted. The case remains officially unsolved. |
| April 4, 1991 | Sacramento County, California | 6 (Note: Including three of the perpetrators) | 11 | 17 | 1991 Sacramento hostage crisis: For eight hours forty-one people were held hostage inside an electronics store, by four Vietnamese refugees who killed three and injured 14 (11 by gunfire). Three of the four perpetrators were shot and killed by responding police. |
| January 26, 1991 | Chimayo, New Mexico | 7 | 1 | 8 | 1991 Chimayo shootings: Seven people were killed in a shooting rampage perpetrated by 28-year-old Ricky Abeyta in Chimayo, New Mexico. Abeyta was convicted and sentenced to life Imprisonment. |
| January 12, 1991 | Boston, Massachusetts | 5 | 1 | 6 | Boston Chinatown massacre: Six men were shot, five fatally, in a gang-related shooting at a social club. |
| September 28, 1990 | Berkeley, California | 2 | 7 | 9 | Henry's Pub hostage incident: A schizophrenic man held 33 hostages in a bar near the University of California, Berkeley campus. After seven hours police stormed the bar, and in the siege the gunman and a hostage were killed, and six students and a police officer were wounded. |
| July 17–18, 1990 | Jacksonville, Florida | 12 | 6 | 18 | James Edward Pough: A convicted felon returned to the loan office he had used to purchase a car and opened fire, killing eleven people and injuring six before committing suicide. |
| February 10, 1990 | Las Cruces, New Mexico | 5 | 2 | 7 | Las Cruces bowling alley massacre: Two unknown perpetrators entered the bowling alley and killed four people and injured three before fleeing. Though one victim later died from their injuries in 1999. The case is still unsolved. |
| February 2, 1990 | Quitman County, Mississippi | 4 | 0 | 4 | Parker family murders: Two burglars broke into a home and took the four residents, consisting of a couple and their two children, hostage. The burglars tortured and sexually assaulted the 9-year-old daughter as they forced the parents to watch before shooting all of them, and they set the house on fire. Three victims died of gunshot wounds and the 9-year-old victim died of smoke inhalation. One of the perpetrators was additionally convicted of an unrelated murder of a man, who went missing two weeks prior and was found dead four days before the massacre, and allegedly confessed to a total of 13 murders. |

=== 1980s ===
| Date | Location | Dead | Injured | Total | Description |
|---|---|---|---|---|---|
| September 14, 1989 | Louisville, Kentucky | 9 | 12 | 21 | Standard Gravure shooting: A 47-year-old pressman killed eight people and injured twelve at his former workplace, Standard Gravure, before committing suicide. |
| April 17, 1989 | Kirtland, Ohio | 5 | 0 | 5 | Kirtland murders: A cult leader had five fellow members of his cult killed. He was arrested in 1990. |
| January 17, 1989 | Stockton, California | 6 | 31 | 37 | Stockton schoolyard shooting: A drifter used a semi-automatic rifle to kill five children and wound 31 other students and teachers on the school playground before committing suicide. |
| September 26, 1988 | Greenwood, South Carolina | 2 | 9 | 11 | 1988 Oakland Elementary School shooting: The perpetrator shot and killed two eight-year-old students and wounded nine others (seven students, a teacher, and a gym coach) in the school's cafeteria and a classroom before being arrested. He was sentenced to death. |
| September 22, 1988 | Chicago, Illinois | 5 | 2 | 7 | 1988 Chicago shootings: The perpetrator fatally shot an employee and store owner of an auto parts store and injured a city garage man. He then entered Moses Montefiore Academy, killing a school custodian, a police officer, and injuring another police officer. The wounded police officer killed the perpetrator. |
| July 17, 1988 | Winston-Salem, North Carolina | 4 | 6 | 10 | Old Salisbury Road shooting: The perpetrator shot nine passers-by from the center line on the road, killing four and injuring five before being arrested. |
| May 20, 1988 | Winnetka, Illinois | 2 | 6 | 8 | 1988 Winnetka attacks: The perpetrator entered the Hubbard Woods Elementary School and killed one student and wounded five others before entering a home and holding the inhabitants hostage before committing suicide. |
| February 16, 1988 | Sunnyvale, California | 7 | 3 | 10 | Sunnyvale ESL shooting: After stalking his coworker, the perpetrator entered the ESL building with several weapons and shot at employees and bystanders, killing seven people and wounding three by gunfire before surrendering to police and SWAT officers. |
| December 22–28, 1987 | Dover and Russelville, Arkansas | 8 | 4 | 12 | Ronald Gene Simmons: The perpetrator murdered sixteen friends and family—eight by gunfire, seven by strangulation, and one by drowning—and wounded four others before being arrested. |
| December 7, 1987 | Cayucos, California | 3 | 3 | 6 | Pacific Southwest Airlines Flight 1771: The perpetrator David Burke entered the cockpit of Pacific Southwest Airlines Flight 1771 and killed the pilot and co-pilot as well as shooting three other people before crashing the plane and killing all forty-three passengers and crew on board. |
| September 4, 1987 | St. Louis, Missouri | 5 | 2 | 7 | 1987 St. Louis National Supermarkets shooting: Two gunmen, Donnie Blankenship and Marvin Jennings, disguised as cleaners and entered a local National Supermarkets store in St. Louis, Missouri. They committed firearm robbery and shot all seven employees, leading to five deaths and the other two injured. Both men were found guilty and sentenced to life imprisonment for their respective roles in the shooting. |
| August 30, 1987 | Boston, Massachusetts | 6 | 2 | 8 | 1987 Dorchester killings: A 23-year-old Vietnamese man, Minh Hoang Le, shot seven of his family members following a dispute over stealing thousands of dollars from them, killing five. Le would commit suicide when the police arrived at his home. |
| April 23, 1987 | Palm Bay, Florida | 6 | 10 | 16 | 1987 Palm Bay shooting: A 59-year-old man shot sixteen people, killing six, at two shopping centers. |
| January 17, 1987 | Shelby, North Carolina | 3 | 2 | 5 | Shelby bookstore murders: Several men shot five people execution-style at an adult bookstore, killing three, before setting the establishment on fire. Two men were charged for the killings but were either acquitted or had their charges dismissed, and the crime is officially unsolved. |
| December 8, 1986 | Oakland, California | 6 | 2 | 8 | David Esco Welch: A man and his girlfriend broke into his ex-girlfriend's home and shot the ex-girlfriend and her family members, killing six and wounding two. |
| August 20, 1986 | Edmond, Oklahoma | 15 | 6 | 21 | Edmond post office shooting: A part-time employee entered to begin his day before locking the doors and killing fourteen coworkers and injuring six others before committing suicide. |
| April 11, 1986 | Pinecrest, Florida | 4 | 5 | 9 | 1986 FBI Miami shootout: Two suspects in several violent crimes opened fire on pursuing FBI agents after being forced off the road. Both suspects and two FBI agents were killed in the shootout, 5 FBI agents were wounded. |
| October 30, 1985 | Springfield, Pennsylvania | 3 | 7 | 10 | 1985 Springfield Mall shooting: The perpetrator fired first at customers outside the Springfield Mall, and then moved inside and killed three and wounded seven before she was disarmed. |
| December 22, 1984 | New York City, New York | 0 | 4 | 4 | 1984 New York City Subway shooting: Four teenagers were shot and wounded by the perpetrator on a New York subway train. |
| December 14, 1984 | Geronimo, Oklahoma | 1 | 3 | 4 | Geronimo bank murders: A 19-year-old man entered a bank and lured three tellers to a back room, where he stabbed them to death. He then lured four customers to the back and shot them with a pistol, killing one. He was arrested with an accomplice three days later. |
| August 31, 1984 | Los Angeles, California | 4 | 0 | 4 | Tiequon Cox: Two men invaded a home and shot and killed four people before being scared off by survivors. The shooters were later arrested. |
| July 24, 1984 | Hot Springs, Arkansas | 6 | 2 | 8 | 1984 Hot Springs motel shooting: After a traffic stop, the perpetrator engaged in a gun fight with the officer, injuring each other along with an unrelated person. Despite being wounded, the shooter then entered a motel bar and fatally shot four people while injuring another before dying. The officer later succumbed to his injuries two years later on Sept. 5, 1986. |
| July 18, 1984 | San Diego, California | 23 (Note: Including an unborn child) | 19 | 42 | San Ysidro McDonald's massacre: A male suspect entered a busy McDonald's and opened fire with an Uzi, shotgun and semiautomatic pistol, and killed twenty-two people, including an unborn child, and injured nineteen before being killed by a police sniper. |
| June 24, 1984 | Dallas, Texas | 6 | 1 | 7 | 1984 Dallas nightclub shooting: After being rejected by a woman on the dance floor, a man opened fire, killing six and injuring one. |
| May 17, 1984 | Manley Hot Springs, Alaska | 9 | 1 | 10 | 1984 Manley Hot Springs murders: A man killed seven residents of a remote Alaskan village at a boat landing. After a manhunt, the attacker shot two state troopers pursuing him in a helicopter, killing one, before he was shot and killed by a third trooper. |
| April 15, 1984 | New York City, New York | 11 | 0 | 11 | 1984 Palm Sunday massacre: During a believed home invasion eleven people—three adults, one teenager, six children, and an unborn child—were killed. An infant was left unharmed. |
| February 24, 1984 | Los Angeles, California | 3 | 12 | 15 | Tyrone Mitchell: The perpetrator fired on children in a school playground from his home across the street, and killed two individuals and injured twelve others before committing suicide. |
| October 11, 1983 | College Station/Hempstead, Texas | 6 | 0 | 6 | Eliseo Moreno: A man searching for his estranged wife killed his brother-in-law and the brother-in-law's wife before shooting a Texas Highway Patrol trooper dead and stealing his firearms. He shot and killed three people unprovoked before taking a family hostage and driving to Pasadena, Texas, where he freed them and kidnapped another man. The shooter was apprehended at a roadblock and sentenced to death. |
| October 8, 1983 | Grayson County, Texas | 4 | 0 | 4 | Lester Bower: Four men were found shot to death execution-style in an airplane hangar. A man was arrested and sentenced to death for the crime. |
| September 23, 1983 | Kilgore, Texas | 5 | 0 | 5 | Kentucky Fried Chicken murders: 3 men killed 5 people at a Kentucky Fried Chicken restaurant in Kilgore, Texas during an armed robbery. |
| July 16, 1983 | Homer Township, Illinois | 5 | 1 | 6 | Milton Johnson: A serial killer killed two people in a car along the road before killing two police officers who pulled over to help. He also shot and killed a passing motorist. |
| March 1, 1983 | McCarthy, Alaska | 6 | 2 | 8 | Louis D. Hastings: A local resident opened fire at neighbors, killing six people and injuring two others. |
| February 19, 1983 | Seattle, Washington | 13 | 1 | 14 | Wah Mee massacre: Three perpetrators entered a gambling club at the Louisa Hotel during a robbery and killed thirteen people and wounded one in an attempt to leave no witnesses. |
| October 23, 1982 | Miracle Valley, Arizona | 4 | 5 | 9 | Miracle Valley shootout: A confrontation between officers and church members at the Christ Miracle Healing Center and Church escalated into a shootout that killed 2 church members and injured 7 others. 2 of the injured died later, possibly due to their injuries. |
| September 25, 1982 | Wilkes-Barre, Pennsylvania and Jenkins Township, Pennsylvania | 13 | 1 | 14 | 1982 Wilkes-Barre shootings: The perpetrator used an AR-15 to shoot and kill thirteen people and injure one in his home and the home of a former girlfriend. A four-hour standoff occurred before officers were able to arrest and hold him on several charges. |
| August 20, 1982 | Miami, Florida | 8 | 3 | 11 | Carl Robert Brown: A teacher opened fire inside a welding shop, killing eight people and injuring three before attempting to flee by bicycle; he was run down as he cycled away. |
| August 9, 1982 | Grand Prairie, Texas | 7 | 3 | 10 | 1982 Grand Prairie warehouse shootings: A man killed six people at two warehouses before stealing a truck and dying in a shootout with police. |
| May 3, 1982 | Anchorage, Alaska | 4 | 0 | 4 | Charles L. Meach: A schizophrenic man left a psychiatric hospital on a day pass and killed four teenagers in a park before being arrested. |
| February 16, 1982 | Clare County, Michigan | 7 | 0 | 7 | Rock Road massacre: Livestock auctioneer Robert Lee Haggart shot and killed seven members of the Post family on the day before a court hearing to finalize his divorce from one of the victims. |
| October 16, 1981 | Floyd County, Kentucky | 5 | 3 | 8 | 1981 Allen shooting: The perpetrator entered the business and opened fire, killing five people and injuring three others. The perpetrator was arrested shortly after at his home. |
| May 7, 1981 | Salem, Oregon | 5 | 18 | 23 | Oregon Museum Tavern shooting: The perpetrator entered the location and fired, killing five people and injuring eighteen before he was wrestled to the ground. |
| March 30, 1981 | Washington D.C. | 1 (Note: James Brady was injured in the shooting, but he was permanently disabled until dying of injuries from the gunshot wound in 2014) | 3 | 4 | Attempted assassination of Ronald Reagan: John Hinckley Jr. attempted to kill President Ronald Reagan as to impress actress Jodie Foster, who he was infatuated with. Reagan was shot but survived, as did Secret Service agent Tim McCarthy and police officer Thomas Delahanty. Press Secretary James Brady was also shot, but he suffered permanent brain damage as a result, and his death in 2014 was ruled a homicide. |
| November 19, 1980 | New York City, New York | 2 | 6 | 8 | West Street Massacre: A man targeting the LGBT community used a submachine gun to kill two people and wound six at multiple gay bars before being arrested. |
| October 23, 1980 | Des Peres, Missouri | 4 | 0 | 4 | 1980 Pope's Cafeteria shooting: Maurice Oscar Byrd, a pest exterminator, entered a local cafeteria with a gun and shot all four employees execution-style during a robbery, in which Byrd stole about $9,000 in total. Byrd was found guilty of murdering all four victims, and sentenced to death and executed on August 23, 1991. |
| July 5, 1980 | Nashville, Tennessee | 3 | 2 | 5 | Cecil Johnson Jr.: A robber took money at a convenience store, then shot and wounded the owner and another man and killed the owner's son. He killed two other people as he left the store. |
| June 22, 1980 | Daingerfield, Texas | 5 | 11 | 16 | Daingerfield church shooting: The perpetrator killed five people and wounded ten others after they had declined to be character witnesses in the trial of him raping his daughter. |
| May 9, 1980 | Norco, California | 3 | 11 | 14 | Norco shootout: Five bank robbers engaged in a shootout with deputies of Riverside County Sheriff's Department and San Bernardino County Sheriff's Department. A sheriff's deputy and two robbers were killed. Eight officers, two robbers, and one civilian were also injured. |
| February 3, 1980 | El Paso, Texas | 5 | 3 | 8 | Starburst Lounge shooting: A man killed five people and injured three others at a bar with a rifle before being subdued and arrested. |

=== 1970s ===
| Date | Location | Dead | Injured | Total | Description |
|---|---|---|---|---|---|
| December 3, 1979 | Sabana Seca, Puerto Rico | 2 | 10 | 12 | 1979 Sabana Seca ambush: Gunmen from Puerto Rican nationalist paramilitary groups opened fire on a US Navy bus carrying 18 unarmed sailors, killing two and injuring ten. |
| November 3, 1979 | Greensboro, North Carolina | 5 | 12 | 17 | Greensboro massacre: Members of the Communist Workers Party and others demonstrated against the KKK and the American Nazi Party, the event dissolved into a gunfight in which five people were killed and about twelve people were wounded. |
| April 27, 1979 | San Antonio, Texas | 3 | 55 | 58 | 1979 San Antonio parade shooting: A man opened fire from his trailer on the Battle of Flowers parade, killing two people and wounding 55 others before dying by suicide. |
| January 29, 1979 | San Diego, California | 2 | 9 | 11 | Cleveland Elementary School shooting (San Diego): A 16-year-old girl who lived across the street shot and killed two people and injured nine others before being arrested. |
| December 15, 1978 | Clearwater, Minnesota | 4 | 1 | 5 | Joseph Ture Jr.: A serial killer shot and killed a woman at her home before tying up and shooting her four children, killing three of them. |
| July 16, 1978 | Oklahoma City, Oklahoma | 6 | 0 | 6 | Roger Dale Stafford: Roger Dale Stafford entered a Sirloin Stockade restaurant with his wife and brother intending to rob it; the three then waited until closing time and proceeded to order six employees into the freezer, whom Stafford then shot execution-style. |
| June 28, 1978 | Boston, Massachusetts | 5 | 0 | 5 | Blackfriars Massacre: Four known criminals and a former Boston television investigative news anchorman and reporter were all killed in a supposed sale of cocaine. |
| January 27, 1978 | Arden Arcade, California | 4 | 0 | 4 | Richard Chase: A serial killer entered a home and shot and killed four people, including two children. The shooter engaged in necrophilia and cannibalism with the corpse of one of the victims. He was arrested shortly afterwards. |
| September 4, 1977 | San Francisco, California | 5 | 11 | 16 | Golden Dragon massacre: Five members of a Chinese youth gang attempted to kill rival gang members, which quickly turned into a shootout in which five people died and eleven were injured. |
| August 26, 1977 | Hackettstown and Mansfield, Township, New Jersey. | 7 | 0 | 7 | 1977 Erie Lackawanna Railway shooting: A man distressed over an insurance dispute involving his wrecked car grabbed a high-powered carbine rifle and carried out a shooting rampage, killing six people before dying by suicide after being surrounded by authorities. |
| August 14, 1977 | Bayou Blue, Louisiana | 4 | 0 | 4 | David Dene Martin: A man confronted the man who his wife was having an affair with at his trailer where he shot and killed him and three others who were with him. |
| July 27, 1977 | Carol City, Florida | 6 | 2 | 8 | Carol City murders: Three perpetrators tied up eight people in a drug house and shot all of them, killing six and wounding two. |
| July 23, 1977 | Klamath Falls, Oregon | 7 | 3 | 10 | 1977 Klamath Falls nightclub shooting: A man fired at people exiting a tavern, killing seven (including an unborn child). He was arrested after he shot and wounded two police officers and was shot in return. |
| February 14, 1977 | New Rochelle, New York | 7 | 4 | 11 | 1977 New Rochelle shooting: A suspended worker arrived at the moving company he worked at and opened fire, killing six people and injuring four others before killing himself. |
| August 11, 1976 | Wichita, Kansas | 3 | 7 | 10 | 1976 Wichita Holiday Inn shooting: 19-year-old Michael Soles, who was upset with the loss of his girlfriend, shot multiple people on the street from the 26th floor of the Holiday Inn. The shooting resulted in the deaths of three people and six people injured. Soles was shot by police and later arrested for the shooting. Soles was sentenced to life imprisonment for the shooting. |
| August 2, 1976 | Fort Worth, Texas | 2 | 2 | 4 | T. Cullen Davis: Four people were shot at a mansion, two fatally. A millionaire was acquitted of the murders. |
| July 12, 1976 | Fullerton, California | 7 | 2 | 9 | 1976 California State University, Fullerton massacre: A custodian at the university killed seven people and wounded two others before fleeing the school. He was arrested. |
| February 19, 1976 | Los Angeles, California | 1 | 7 | 8 | 1976 Computer Learning Center shooting: A student opened fire on his peers at their computer school, killing one and injuring six. He was then shot and wounded by a nearby security guard. |
| May 24, 1975 | Dayton, Ohio | 3 | 11 | 14 | Russell Lee Smith: After killing his girlfriend and wounding two others at a motorcycle club, a man shot several more people in the neighborhood, killing another woman and wounding nine. The wounded included two women the gunman held hostage and raped. The gunman died by suicide as police closed in on him. |
| March 30, 1975 | Hamilton, Ohio | 11 | 0 | 11 | Easter Sunday Massacre: The perpetrator shot and killed his mother, brother, sister-in-law, and eight nieces and nephews in five minutes before calling police and being arrested. |
| December 30, 1974 | Olean, New York | 5 | 7 | 12 | 1974 Olean High School shooting: A student locked himself in a third floor room before shooting out the window, killing five people, including two unborn children, and injuring seven by gunfire before being subdued with tear gas and arrested. |
| November 14, 1974 | Amityville, New York | 6 | 0 | 6 | Amityville murders: A man killed his parents and his four siblings at their home. |
| October 19, 1974 | New Britain, Connecticut | 6 | 0 | 6 | Donna Lee Bakery murders: A bakery owner, a clerk, three customers, and a passerby were shot in the back of the head during a robbery at a bakery. |
| June 11, 1974 | Union City, California | 1 | 3 | 4 | Assassination of William Cann: Shots were fired at a meeting between police and local Chicanos, killing an officer and wounding three civilians. |
| April 22, 1974 | Ogden, Utah | 3 | 2 | 5 | Hi-Fi murders: Three men robbed a Hi-Fi store in Ogden, Utah and took five people hostage by tying them up and torturing them, then shooting three of them to death and injuring two more. |
| November 17, 1973 | Lyon County, Iowa | 4 | 1 | 5 | Gitchie Manitou murders: Five teenagers were attacked in Gitchie Manitou State Preserve, by three brothers. The four males were killed and the female was kidnapped and raped before escaping. |
| November 6, 1973 | Victor, California | 9 | 0 | 9 | Douglas Gretzler: Two robbers tied up seven people and shot them to death before killing two other people inside the home. |
| May 14, 1973 | Donalsonville, Georgia | 6 | 0 | 6 | Alday family murders: Four men burglarized a mobile home while it was unoccupied, and fatally shot the 6 family members that lived there as they arrived. One of the victims was also raped and tortured. |
| April 22, 1973 | Los Angeles, California | 7 | 9 | 16 | 1973 South Los Angeles shootings: A man shot sixteen people in the South Side of Los Angeles, killing seven and wounding nine. The gunman was sentenced to life imprisonment. |
| February 11, 1973 | Santa Cruz, California | 4 | 0 | 4 | Herbert Mullin: A serial killer shot and killed four teenagers with a pistol as they camped. He believed that his victims were "polluting" the forest. |
| January 18, 1973 | Washington D.C. | 3 | 2 | 5 | 1973 Hanafi Muslim massacre: Three individuals were shot and killed, while two others were wounded, and four children drowned in an attack by six men. |
| December 31, 1972 – January 7, 1973 | New Orleans, Louisiana | 10 | 13 | 23 | Mark Essex: Over the course of ten hours and in several locations the perpetrator, having previously killed two police officers and wounded a third, killed seven people and injured ten before being shot and killed by police. |
| September 6, 1972 | St. Croix, U.S. Virgin Islands | 8 | 8 | 16 | Fountain Valley massacre: Five robbers attacked guests (and employees) at a Virgin Islands golf club frequented by tourists. The leader also harbored political and racial animosity arising out his perception of the Islands' colonial history. All were sentenced to life terms, although the leader escaped after hijacking an airplane to Cuba, and one defendant's sentence was commuted after 22 years. |
| June 21, 1972 | Cherry Hill, New Jersey | 7 | 6 | 13 | 1972 Cherry Hill shooting: A man opened fire at Key Personnel Incorporated after they rejected his application, killing six people, including the company's president, and injuring six others. |
| January 10, 1972 | Baton Rouge, Louisiana | 5 | 31 | 36 | 1972 Baton Rouge shooting: A shootout occurred between black protesters and police officers, killing four people and wounding thirty-two others. A fifth man died of his wounds two weeks later. |
| November 9, 1971 | Westfield, New Jersey | 5 | 0 | 5 | John List: John List shot and killed his wife, mother and three teenage children following financial difficulties, further motivated by the belief that his family were abandoning their Christian faith. He was arrested in 1989 after living under an assumed name after a neighbor recognized him from America's Most Wanted. |
| June 14, 1971 | Detroit, Michigan | 8 | 0 | 8 | Hazelwood massacre: Eight people were shot to death in a house on Hazelwood Street in Detroit. The massacre remains unsolved. |
| February 15, 1971 | Dallas, Texas | 3 | 1 | 4 | 1971 shooting of Dallas police officers: Two men abducted five law enforcement officers, before opening fire and killed three and injured one. The fifth officer escaped and called for help. |
| October 19, 1970 | Soquel, California | 5 | 0 | 5 | John Linley Frazier: A mentally ill man entered a home and shot and killed five people with a revolver. |
| August 7, 1970 | San Rafael, California | 4 | 3 | 7 | Marin County Civic Center attacks: The 17-year-old perpetrator took hostages in a court room in an attempt to coerce the release of the Soledad Brothers. Three prisoners released during the siege joined him in the attack, which left the main perpetrator dead along with three others, two of which were other perpetrators, and three others wounded, including another perpetrator. |
| May 15, 1970 | Jackson, Mississippi | 2 | 12 | 14 | Jackson State killings: After responding to the university due to a growing unrest, officers opened fire on a dorm building and two students (one from a local high school) were killed and twelve were injured. |
| May 4, 1970 | Kent, Ohio | 4 | 9 | 13 | Kent State shootings: During a protest of the bombing of Cambodia at the university, members of the Ohio National Guard opened fire, killing four and injuring nine people. |
| April 5–6, 1970 | Valencia, California | 5 | 1 | 6 | Newhall incident: Two men were stopped by two California Highway Patrol officers and opened fire after briefly cooperating with the officers, killing both officers and then engaging in a shootout with other CHP officers and a bystander. After the fleeing from the scene, one of the perpetrators fled to a house and took a hostage, which he later released and committed suicide. The second perpetrator, who was injured by gunfire was arrested after trying to escape with a stolen camper. 4 CHP officers were killed. 1 perpetrator and a civilian were injured. The civilian was pistol-whipped. |

=== 1960s ===
| Date | Location | Dead | Injured | Total | Description |
|---|---|---|---|---|---|
| May 21–25, 1969 | Greensboro, North Carolina | 2 | 27 | 29 | 1969 Greensboro uprising: Student protestors, police officers and members of the National Guard exchanged gunfire on the campuses of James B. Dudley High School and North Carolina Agricultural and Technical State University, due to civil rights issues. Two were killed and twenty-seven injured. |
| April 5, 1969 | near Harrisburg, Pennsylvania | 5 | 16 | 21 | 1969 Pennsylvania Turnpike shootings: A man went on a shooting spree as he drove on the Pennsylvania Turnpike, killing 4 and injuring 16 before fatally shooting himself. |
| January 1-2, 1969 | Westernville, New York | 5 | 5 | 10 | Westernville New Year's Day shooting: A man opened fire at a family gathering, killing four people and wounding five others. He died by suicide the following morning. |
| July 23–24, 1968 | Cleveland, Ohio | 7 | 16 | 23 | Glenville shootout: A gun battle between the Cleveland Police Department and the Black Nationalists of New Libya led to seven people being killed and at least 16 injured, and sparked the Glenville Riots. |
| June 25, 1968 | Good Hart, Michigan | 6 | 0 | 6 | Robison family murders: While vacationing, a family was shot and killed, with the parents also bludgeoned with a hammer. The investigation continued for fifteen months after the bodies were discovered. |
| June 5, 1968 | Los Angeles, California | 1 | 5 | 6 | Assassination of Robert F. Kennedy: Presidential candidate Robert F. Kennedy was killed and five others wounded in a shooting attack at a hotel. The shooter, Sirhan Sirhan, was sentenced to life imprisonment. |
| February 8, 1968 | Orangeburg, South Carolina | 3 | 28 | 31 | Orangeburg Massacre: After responding to the scene of about 200 protestors protesting racial segregation, after an officer was assaulted, officers began to shoot into the crowd; three people were killed and twenty-eight injured. |
| October 23, 1967 | Clinton County, Pennsylvania | 8 | 5 | 13 | 1967 Clinton County, Pennsylvania shootings: A man opened fire at his workplace in Lock Haven, killing 5 before driving to a nearby airport and wounding a woman. He then drove to Loganton where he fatally shot his neighbor and wounded his wife. The shooter was fatally shot by police after a gunfight. Five years later, the neighbor's wife died of her injuries. |
| November 12, 1966 | Mesa, Arizona | 5 | 2 | 7 | 1966 Rose-Mar College of Beauty shooting: A man shot and killed five people in the Rose-Mar College of Beauty, including four women and a toddler. He later told police he was inspired by the University of Texas tower shooting and Richard Speck's spree killing in Chicago earlier the same year. |
| August 1, 1966 | Austin, Texas | 16 | 31 | 47 | University of Texas tower shooting: A student and former Marine sharpshooter killed his wife and mother before using the University of Texas clock tower as a sniper's nest to kill 15 people, including a pregnant woman, and wound 31 before being killed by police. |
| June 17, 1966 | Paterson, New Jersey | 3 | 1 | 4 | 1966 Paterson, New Jersey bar shooting: Two men opened fire in a bar, killing three people and wounding another. A boxer and another man were wrongfully convicted and imprisoned for 18 years. |
| April 25, 1965 | Orcutt, California | 4 | 10 | 14 | 1965 Highway 101 sniper attack: A 16-year-old stole his father's military rifle and shot at automobiles driving down the highway, killing two and injuring eleven before committing suicide. A third victim died later at the hospital. |
| November 22, 1963 | Dallas, Texas | 2 | 2 | 4 | Assassination of John F. Kennedy: President John F. Kennedy and police officer J. D. Tippit were killed, and Texas governor John Connally and James Tague were both injured. The suspect, Lee Harvey Oswald, was himself shot the day after. |
| May 27, 1962 | Martinsburg, Iowa | 5 | 1 | 6 | Gayno Smith: Five family members were killed and another was wounded by a relative. The shooter was arrested five days later. |

=== 1950s ===
| Date | Location | Dead | Injured | Total | Description |
|---|---|---|---|---|---|
| December 19, 1959 | Osprey, Florida | 4 | 0 | 4 | Walker family murders: Four members of the Walker family were fatally shot inside their house in Osprey, Florida. The perpetrator remains unknown. |
| November 15, 1959 | Holcomb, Kansas | 4 | 0 | 4 | Clutter family murders: Four members of the Clutter family, parents and two teenage children were shot and killed in their home by two robbers. |
| January 18, 1958 | Maxton, North Carolina | 0 | 8 | 8 | Battle of Hayes Pond: During a publicized Ku Klux Klan rally there was a clash between Lumbee Indians and Klan members, causing a disruption of the rally and four Klansmen to be wounded, along with three reporters and a Lakota U.S. Army soldier. Most of the resulting news coverage condemned the Klansmen and praised the Lumbees. |
| March 1, 1954 | Washington D.C. | 0 | 5 | 5 | 1954 United States Capitol shooting: Four Puerto Rican nationalists shot from the Ladies Gallery of the House of Representatives chamber and wounded five Representatives. |
| January 2, 1951 | Joplin, Missouri | 5 | 0 | 5 | Billy Cook: A robber posing as a hitchhiker took a family hostage in Oklahoma and forced them to drive cross-country to Texas, New Mexico, Arkansas, and finally to Joplin in Missouri where he fatally shot them all after repeated attempted escapes. |
| November 17, 1950 | Franklin Township and Minotola, New Jersey | 5 | 4 | 9 | Ernest Ingenito: A man shot his wife and her family members in three homes, killing five of her relatives and wounding his wife and three others. |

=== 1940s ===
| Date | Location | Dead | Injured | Total | Description |
|---|---|---|---|---|---|
| September 6, 1949 | Camden, New Jersey | 13 | 3 | 16 | Howard Unruh: Unruh walked through his neighborhood for 12 minutes and killed thirteen; including three children, and injured three. |
| November 6, 1948 | Chester, Pennsylvania | 9 | 3 | 12 | Market Street Massacre: A man opened fire from the window of his apartment, killing eight people and injuring three by gunfire before dying by suicide as police breached the apartment. |
| July 25, 1946 | Walton County, Georgia | 4 | 0 | 4 | Moore's Ford lynchings: Four young African Americans; two married couples were lynched by a white mob and were shot and killed. |
| July 8, 1945 | Salina, Utah | 9 | 19 | 28 | 1945 Utah prisoner of war massacre: Nine German POWs were killed and nineteen wounded by an American Army Private who shot at them while on guard duty. |
| May 6, 1940 | South Pasadena, California | 5 | 2 | 7 | 1940 South Pasadena shootings: A recently fired principal targeted former colleagues at the South Pasadena Unified School District headquarters and at South Pasadena Junior High School, killing five people and injuring another before attempting suicide. |

=== 1930s ===
| Date | Location | Dead | Injured | Total | Description |
|---|---|---|---|---|---|
| May 30, 1937 | Chicago, Illinois | 10 | 67+ | 77+ | 1937 Memorial Day massacre: The Chicago Police Department shot at workers associated with the Steel Workers Organizing Committee as they marched to a Republic Steel mill in order to picket, killing 10 and injuring at least 67 others. Dozens of people were also clubbed by police in the incident. |
| October 24, 1935 | Rio Piedras, Puerto Rico | 5 | 2 | 7 | Río Piedras massacre: During a student assembly armed guards had been requested in case of violence. After stopping a suspicious vehicle a struggle ensued and four members of the Puerto Rican National party were killed as well as a bystander and a student and officer wounded. |
| November 9, 1934 | Kelayres, Pennsylvania | 5 | 12–25 | 17–30 | Kelayres massacre: An election-eve parade and rally was shot at as it passed by the home of the local Republican boss, three victims died and between twelve and twenty-five were wounded. |
| September 6, 1934 | Honea Path, South Carolina | 7 | 20–75 | 27–82 | Chiquola Mill Massacre: Textile workers taking part in the textile workers' strike of 1934 were fired upon after scuffling with strikebreakers, resulting in the deaths of seven and between 20 and 75 injuries. |
| September 8, 1933 | Belfast, Maine | 5 | 0 | 5 | 1933 Belfast, Maine shooting: A gunman shot four men to death on the street before fatally shooting himself in a blacksmith shop. |
| June 17, 1933 | Kansas City, Missouri | 5 | 3 | 8 | Kansas City massacre: Four law enforcement officers and a fugitive were killed, with three law enforcement officers wounded in a shootout between the two groups. |
| March 6, 1933 | Cleveland, Ohio | 6 | 6 | 12 | 1933 Cleveland shootings: A mentally ill man shot five people to death and injured six others before being shot to death by police. |
| February 15, 1933 | Miami, Florida | 1 | 5 | 6 | Attempted assassination of Franklin D. Roosevelt: A man with a handgun fired shots at President-elect Franklin D. Roosevelt during a speech. He missed his target, but killed Chicago mayor Anton Cermak and wounded five other people. |
| January 2, 1932 | Brookline, Missouri | 6 | 0 | 6 | Young Brothers massacre: Two criminals shot and killed six police officers during an attempted arrest. |

=== 1920s ===
| Date | Location | Dead | Injured | Total | Description |
|---|---|---|---|---|---|
| December 25, 1929 | Germanton, North Carolina | 7 | 0 | 7 | Lawson family murders: Charles Lawson shot and killed his wife and five children, and bludgeoned his youngest child to death, before committing suicide. The second eldest child survived after being sent on an errand. |
| February 14, 1929 | Chicago, Illinois | 7 | 0 | 7 | Saint Valentine's Day Massacre: Seven members and associates of Chicago's North Side Gang were shot and killed execution-style against a garage wall. |
| August 22, 1928 | Fairfield, California | 9 | 4 | 13 | 1928 Fairfield murders: The perpetrator, armed with a lever-action rifle and a hatchet, attacked the ranch where he used to work, killing eleven people, nine of which were by gunfire, before fleeing. |
| November 21, 1927 | Serene, Colorado | 6 | ~20 | ~26 | Columbine Mine massacre: A fight broke out between striking coal mine workers and Colorado state militia. The unarmed miners claimed that they were fired upon by a mine tipple or machine gun, which is disputed by police. |
| June 4, 1925 | Hamilton, Ohio | 8 | 1 | 9 | Russell family shooting: A man shot and killed 8 of his family members while most of them were asleep before shooting himself in the lung, injuring himself. |
| September 9, 1924 | Hanapēpē, Hawaii | 20 | 0 | 20 | Hanapepe massacre: During a strike of Filipino sugar workers, in an attempt to rescue two hostage strikebreakers police killed 16 strikers, while strikers killed four law enforcement members. |
| January 1–7, 1923 | Levy County, Florida | 8-150 | unknown | 8–150+ | Rosewood massacre: The massacre was a racially motivated massacre and destruction of the town of Rosewood after a white woman claimed she was beaten and raped by a black man. The town was overrun by a white mob who hunted for the black inhabitants who had fled the area and hid in surrounding swamps before being evacuated. Six black and two white individuals were killed. Some reports estimate 27 to 150 deaths. |
| June 21–22, 1922 | Herrin, Illinois | 23 | 0 | 23 | Herrin massacre: During a United Mineworkers of America nationwide strike union, miners shot at strikebreakers working at the mine. The mines guards killed three union miners on June 21, and the miners killed 20 strikebreakers and guards on June 22. |
| May 31 – June 1, 1921 | Greenwood, Tulsa, Oklahoma | 36–300 | 800+ | 836+ (exact number disputed) | Tulsa race massacre: Armed white mobs attacked black residents and businesses in the Greenwood District of Tulsa, then the wealthiest black community in the U.S., known as "Black Wall Street". |
| November 2, 1920 | Ocoee, Florida | 32–82 | unknown | 32–82+ | Ocoee massacre: White mob attack on African-American residents on day of the 1920 presidential election. Started because a black man wanted to vote. All black-owned property seized and population reduced to zero for 60 years. |
| April 22, 1920 | near Turtle Lake, North Dakota | 8 | 0 | 8 | Wolf family murders: A man used a hatchet and a double-barreled shotgun to murder 8 members of the Wolf family. |
| April 21, 1920 | Butte, Montana | 1 | 16 | 17 | Anaconda Road massacre: Anaconda Copper Mining Company company guards opened fire on striking miners, killing 1 and injuring 16 others. |
| February 9, 1920 | Lexington, Kentucky | 6 | 46+ | 50+ | Will Lockett: Police and National Guard soldiers opened fire into a white lynch mob attempting to storm a courthouse and kill African-American serial killer Will Lockett. At least 50 people were shot, with five rioters and a bystander being killed. |

=== 1910s ===
| Date | Location | Dead | Injured | Total | Description |
|---|---|---|---|---|---|
| November 5, 1916 | Everett, Washington | 7+ | 47 | 54+ | Everett massacre: Local authorities and vigilantes confronted Industrial Workers of the World (IWW) members attempting to support a labor strike by shingle weavers as their ferryboat docked at the harbor. A shootout ensued, resulting in the deaths of at least five IWW members and two deputized citizens and injuries to around 47 people. |
| August 14, 1913 | Adams Township, Michigan | 2 | 2 | 4 | Seeberville Murders: Strikebreaking guards and deputies opened fire at a boarding home used by miners, killing two men and injuring two other men. Three guards and a deputy were convicted of manslaughter for the shooting. |
| March 14, 1912 | Hillsville, Virginia | 6 | 9 | 15 | Floyd Allen: A man on trial opened fire at the courthouse, killing several people, including the judge, sheriff, and prosecutor. |

=== 1900s ===
| Date | Location | Dead | Injured | Total | Description |
|---|---|---|---|---|---|
| November 13, 1906 | Asheville, North Carolina | 5 | 12 | 17 | 1906 Asheville shooting: A visitor opened fire on people in the street, killing five people and wounding twelve others before being eventually killed himself two days later. |
| August 13, 1903 | Winfield, Kansas | 10 | 25+ | 35+ | Winfield massacre: Nine people were fatally shot at a concert by Army veteran Gilbert Twigg, who then committed suicide to avoid apprehension. |
| April 6, 1902 | Tuscumbia, Alabama | 8 | 2 | 10 | Will Reynolds: A man shot at police who attempted to arrest him, killing seven people and wounding two others. The gunman was shot dead. |
| February 14, 1902 | near Welsh, Louisiana | 6 | 0 | 6 | Earll family murders: A farm worker for the Earll family shot and killed 6 of the Earlls. |
| July 23–27, 1900 | New Orleans, Louisiana | 8 | 20 | 28 | Robert Charles: During Jim Crow in the South, a black man was accosted by police and reacted violently. As he was being chased by a white mob (who lynched and killed an unknown number of blacks in response), the man armed with a rifle and revolver shot and killed seven people and wounded twenty others over several days as police attempted to arrest him. He was shot dead. |
