= List of shootings in New York =

This is a chronological list of shootings committed with the use of firearms in the state of New York which have a Wikipedia article for the shooting, the shooter, the victim, or a related subject.

== List ==
Event	Location	Date	Number killed	Description
Murder of Stanford White	Manhattan, New York City	June 25, 1906	1	
Joseph Bowne Elwell	New York City	June 11, 1920	1	Unsolved
Murder of Monk Eastman	Manhattan, New York City	December 26, 1920	1	Gangland killing
Arnold Rothstein	Manhattan, New York City	November 6, 1928	1	Gangland murder, unsolved
Carlo Tresca	Manhattan, New York City	January 11, 1943	1	Political assassination, unsolved
Arnold Schuster	Brooklyn, New York City	March 8, 1952	1	Gangland murder, unsolved
Albert Anastasia	Manhattan, New York City	October 25, 1957	1	Gangland murder, unsolved
Murder of two NYPD detectives	Brooklyn, New York City	May 18, 1962	2	Botched robbery
Murder of Malcolm X	Manhattan, New York City	February 19, 1965	1	
Clarence 13X	Manhattan, New York City	June 13, 1969	1	
Murder of two NYPD officers	Manhattan, New York City	May 21, 1971	2	Terror attack
Murder of Joe Gallo	Manhattan, New York City	April 7, 1972	1	Gangland murder, unsolved
1972 Harlem mosque incident	Manhattan, New York City	April 14, 1972	1	Ambush of NYPD officers
1974 Olean High School shooting	Olean	December 30, 1974	3	School shooting
Son of Sam killing spree	New York City	July 29, 1976 – July 31, 1977	6	
Death of Randolph Evans	Brooklyn, New York City	November 25, 1976	1	NYPD officer was found to be insane
1977 New Rochelle shooting	New Rochelle	February 14, 1977	7	Workplace shooting
Allard K. Lowenstein	Manhattan, New York City	March 14, 1980	1	Former Congressman killed in his office
Murder of John Lennon	Manhattan, New York City	December 8, 1980	1	Killer found to be insane
1981 Brink's robbery	Nanuet	October 20, 1981	3	Robbery
Palm Sunday massacre	Brooklyn, New York City	April 15, 1984	11	
Shooting of Eleanor Bumpurs	The Bronx, New York City	October 29, 1984	1	Botched eviction; NYPD officer acquitted
1984 New York City Subway shooting	Manhattan, New York City	December 22, 1984	0	"Subway vigilante" attack
Death of Edmund Perry	Manhattan, New York City	June 12, 1985	1	NYPD officer acquitted
Paul Castellano	Manhattan, New York City	December 16, 1985	1	Gangland killing, only John Gotti was convicted
November 1986 shootout	The Bronx, New York City	November 19, 1986	0	
Murder of Edward Byrne	Queens, New York City	December 26, 1988	1	NYPD officer murdered
Murder of Yusef Hawkins	Brooklyn, New York City	August 23, 1989	1	Killed by a mob
The Brooklyn Sniper	New York City	August 23, 1990 – October 2, 1993	3	Serial killer
Assassination of Meir Kahane	Manhattan, New York City	November 5, 1990	1	Terror attack
1993 Long Island Rail Road shooting	Long Island	December 7, 1993	6	Racially-motivated attack
1994 Brooklyn Bridge shooting	Brooklyn, New York City	March 1, 1994	1	Terror attack
Freddy's Fashion Mart attack	Harlem, Manhattan, New York City	December 8, 1995	8	Hostage taking
1995 Bronx shoe store shooting	Pelham Parkway, The Bronx, New York City	December 19, 1995	5	Mass shooting
1997 Empire State Building shooting	Manhattan, New York City	February 23, 1997	2	Terror attack
Wendy's massacre	Queens, New York City	May 24, 2000	5	Robbery
Shooting of Henryk Siwiak	Brooklyn, New York City	September 11, 2001	1	Unsolved
2007 New York City shooting	Manhattan, New York City	March 14, 2007	4	Shooting spree
Binghamton shooting	Binghamton	April 3, 2009	14	Immigration center shooting
2010 City Grill shooting	Buffalo, New York	August 14, 2010	5	Gang violence
Herkimer County shootings	Herkimer County	March 13, 2013	5	Shooting spree
2012 Empire State Building shooting	Manhattan, New York City	August 24, 2012	1	Co-worker violence
2012 Webster shooting	Webster, New York	December 24, 2012	4	Ambush of firefighters
Bronx-Lebanon Hospital attack	The Bronx, New York City	June 30, 2017	2	
Death of Frank Cali	Staten Island, New York City	March 13, 2019	1	Mob boss killed
2022 New York City Subway attack	Brooklyn, New York City	April 12, 2022	0	Racially-motivated mass shooting
2022 Buffalo shooting	Buffalo, New York	May 14, 2022	10	Racially-motivated mass shooting
Killing of Brian Thompson	Manhattan, New York City	December 4, 2024	1	Ambush of healthcare CEO
2025 New York City shooting	Manhattan, New York City	July 28, 2025	5	Mass shooting
