= 1999 Tampa hotel shooting =

Mass shooting in Florida, US

- Location: 27.9674°N 82.5686°W; Radisson Bay Harbor Hotel; Rocky Point, Tampa, Florida, US
- Date: December 30, 1999 c. 3:10 p.m. (EDT; UTC−04:00)
- Attack type: Mass shooting, mass murder, spree shooting, workplace violence
- Weapons: 9mm Lorcin L9 semi-automatic pistol; .38-caliber Charter Arms revolver
- Deaths: 5
- Injuries: 3
- Perpetrator: Silvio Izquierdo-Leyva
- Verdict: Life imprisonment
- Convictions: First-degree murder (5 counts); Attempted first-degree murder with a firearm (7 counts); Armed carjacking (2 counts); Attempted armed carjacking (3 counts); Aggravated assault with a firearm (3 counts)

On December 30, 1999, a mass shooting occurred in and around the Radisson Bay Harbor Hotel in the Rocky Point area of Tampa, Florida, United States. The perpetrator, 36-year-old Silvio Izquierdo-Leyva, an employee of the hotel, murdered four people and injured three others in and around the hotel before fatally shooting another victim while attempting to carjack her car at a nearby grocery store.

On April 10, 2002, Izquierdo-Leyva was found guilty of 20 charges, including five counts of first-degree murder, and sentenced to life imprisonment.

== Background ==
The Radisson Bay Harbor Hotel opened in 1974, and was owned by George Steinbrenner at the time of the attack.

== Shooting ==
Silvio Izquierdo-Leyva, aged 36, left his home for his job as a hotel housekeeper at the Radisson Bay Harbor Hotel at around 8:30 a.m on December 30, 1999. According to his girlfriend, Adriana Ordonez, she called him an hour later, at approximately 9:30 a.m., and noted that he seemed normal. During the call, he instructed her to "get the clothes ready" for washing when he returned home. He had only worked at the hotel for about a month before the shooting.

At around 3:10 p.m., Izquierdo-Leyva, armed with a nickel-plated 9mm handgun and a .38-caliber revolver, began shooting at fellow employees at the hotel. At the time, the hotel was filled with guests in town for the New Year's Day Outback Bowl between Purdue University and the University of Georgia. Izquierdo-Leyva killed Eric Pedroso outside the front entrance, Barbara Carter in the hotel lobby near the registration desk, Jose Aguilar in the restaurant kitchen and George Jones by the swimming pool.

Izquierdo-Leyva shot a total of seven people in several locations (two outside the front entrance, two in the lobby, one in the laundry room, one by the swimming pool and one in the restaurant), killing four and wounding three. After exiting the hotel, he stole a white 1990 Honda Accord at gunpoint from a fellow hotel employee, 20-year-old bellman Rafael Barrios.

Izquierdo-Leyva fled to the nearby grocery store, where he killed 56-year-old Dolores Perdomo in the parking lot while attempting to carjack her four-door burgundy Mercury after she refused to give up her vehicle. After the failed attempt to take Perdomo's car, he successfully commandeered a second vehicle, a white Chevrolet Celebrity station wagon from another driver, Angel Marteliz, who exited the car promptly after being threatened.

At approximately 3:40 p.m., Izquierdo-Leyva arrived at 3023 West Green Street (near Interstate 275) where his sister-in-law, Angela Vazquez, resided. A 16-year-old family friend, Nely Rodriguez, was the only person present in the house at the time. She saw him next to a sink with the water running. He asked where the rest of the family was before he walked out and drove away in the stolen station wagon. He was apprehended by police near Spruce Street and North MacDill Avenue less than 30 minutes after the initial shooting.

== Victims ==
Izquierdo-Leyva killed four co-workers at the hotel, who were identified as Eric Pedroso, aged 29; Barbara Carter, aged 55; Jose Aguilar, aged 40; and George Jones, aged 44. He also shot and killed 56-year-old Dolores Perdomo, who was not an employee of the hotel, in her car while attempting to carjack her.

Three other people were injured in the attack, a 40-year-old man who was critically injured, a 43-year-old man who suffered a gunshot wound to the leg, and a 53-year-old woman who suffered a gunshot wound to the buttocks which required surgery.

== Perpetrator ==
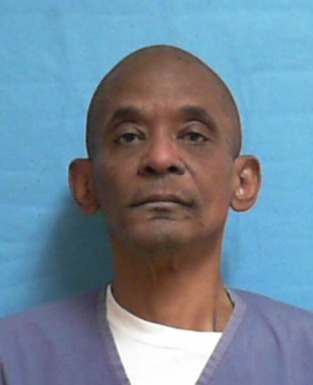
Silvio Izquierdo-Leyva FDOC photo

Silvio Izquierdo-Leyva was born in 7 December 1963 in Cuba. Little is known about his background in Cuba, but he was suspected to have a mother, brothers and sisters in the El Vedado neighborhood in Havana. He is also known to have a 10-year-old daughter who was still in Cuba at the time.

In 1995, Izquierdo-Leyva and his brother, Pedro, rafted to Guantanamo Bay Naval Base and later moved to Mobile, Alabama. Izquierdo-Leyva lived in Mobile between 1996-1998 before moving to Tampa. In 1997, two years before the shooting, Izquierdo-Leyva, who was working in a metal factory at the time, broke into a co-worker's apartment and stabbed him in the leg with a kitchen knife.

In November 1999, just one month before the shooting, Izquierdo-Leyva visited Cuba for a 21-day trip (the maximum allowed by his visa). During the visit, while he was visiting family and friends, he became a devout follower of the Santería religion.

=== Weapons ===
Silvio used two handguns in the shooting:

- A 9mm Lorcin L9 pistol that Silvio acquired from a Big E's Gold & Guns booth at the Floriland Mall flea market on January 2, 1999.
- A .38-caliber Charter Arms revolver that was possibly acquired from a previous owner who purchased it from the Nationwide Sports store. The revolver was shipped from the manufacturer to a now-defunct Pennsylvania distributor in 1976.

== Legal proceedings ==
On April 10, 2002, Izquierdo-Leyva pleaded guilty to a total of 20 charges (five counts of first-degree murder, seven counts of attempted first-degree murder with a firearm, three counts of aggravated assault with a firearm, two counts of armed carjacking and three counts of attempted armed carjacking). On April 15, he was sentenced to life imprisonment without the possibility of parole. Prior to the plea deal, his defense team had planned to argue that he was innocent by reason of insanity.

The trial had been delayed for years, partly due to difficulties in obtaining visas for defense attorneys to visit Cuba to investigate his mental health history.

== See also ==
- Crime in Florida
- List of mass shootings in the United States (1900–1999)
