= 1972 Baton Rouge shooting =

1972 mass shooting in Baton Rouge, Louisiana, US

- Location: 30°26′52″N 91°10′32″W
- Date: January 10, 1972; 54 years ago c. 12:30 pm – c. 12:40 pm CT (UTC−06:00)
- Attack type: Mass shooting
- Weapon: .38 caliber handguns
- Deaths: 5
- Injuries: 31
- Motive: Alleged Black supremacy

On January 10, 1972, four men identified as members from the Nation of Islam (NOI) in Chicago held a public demonstration on North Boulevard near the Temple Theater in Baton Rouge, Louisiana. They stood atop a Cadillac vehicle as they blocked the street. Baton Rouge police officers arrived on scene to disperse the demonstration for disturbing the peace. A violent shootout between the demonstrators and the police ensued, which left two sheriff's deputies and two black males dead at the scene. 31 individuals were injured, including 14 officers. A city-wide curfew was implemented to quell any further racial violence. Another man died from related gunshot wounds seventeen days later.

In May 1973, nine Black Muslims out of fourteen were tried, sentenced, and convicted to 21 years for murder and inciting to riot. However, the Louisiana Supreme Court reversed the convictions, ruling Baton Rouge District Judge Elmo Lear deprived the defense the proper motions to have the trial relocated. During the interim, Lear tossed out the murder charges. In June 1976, a retrial was held again in Baton Rouge, in which the defendants were convicted and sentenced to 21 years a month later.

== Background ==
On New Year's Day 1972, twenty-one Black Muslims, including two women, checked into the Bellemont Motor Hotel on Airline Highway. According to East Baton Rouge District Attorney Sargent Pitcher, the group told a police intelligence officer they were seeking no trouble. On January 7, the police arrested three members for distributing Black Muslim literature without a permit and asking businesses to donate to their fictitious "Young Artists Association" organization. The group then left the Bellemont and moved to the White House Inn on North Third Street.

At the White House Inn, the group invited local young African-Americans for "rap sessions", in which participants confessed the Muslims spoke of "giving the city back to blacks". The group also announced a street rally to be followed by a march to city hall.

== Events ==
List of deaths and those injured

Killed:
- Police officers:
  - Ralph Gayle Hancock, 30
  - Ralph DeWayne Wilder, 27
- Demonstrators:
  - Samuel Upton, 29
  - Thomas Davis, 25
  - Larry Mobley/Lonnie X, 33
- Injured:
  - Robert "Bob" Johnson
  - Abram Hoover
  - John Devine
  - James Barlow
  - Keith Muhammad
  - Milton LeDuff
  - Ronald Crawford
  - John Devine
  - Fred Sliman
  - W. L. "Buck" Gunby
  - James O. Dumigan
  - Joseph Accordo
  - Reddick Stevens
  - Kenneth Savignol
  - Maurice Cockerham
  - Errol Voinche
  - Reece Sirjane
  - Herman Thompson
  - Thomas Walsh
  - George O'Connor
  - Daniel D'Amico
  - Clemson Brown
  - Leroy Davis
  - Edward Sims
  - Moris Courtney
  - Henry Duvall
  - Mitchell Batley

— Sources:

On January 10, 1972, a crowd had gathered near a Cadillac vehicle, which had been used to block North Boulevard. Maurice Cockerham, a WBRZ-TV news editor, cameraman Henry Baptiste, and newscaster Robert "Bob" Johnson arrived on scene and asked what was happening. They were told by the crowd it was none of their business and were requested to leave. Cockerham testified that he heard Samuel Upton, the de facto leader of the demonstration, speaking to the crowd from the roof of the vehicle. According to Cockerham, Upton had "referred to whites as white devils and as serpents and made several references to killing whites, ... that their teachings required that they kill whites." Upton told the crowd, "we'll meet the white devil here today and kill him." He then turned and pointed at three journalists saying, "there are three of the devils here now, but there'll be more later."

Shortly thereafter, the newsmen were confronted by the crowd, in which Baptiste and Cockerham were both hit several times. A rock was thrown at Johnson, knocking him down. The crowd then severely assaulted him. Baptiste doubled back and found Johnson lying on the ground, took him to his car, and dropped him at the Our Lady of the Lake Hospital.

When Baton Rouge police officers arrived on scene, Marion M. Binning, a sheriff's deputy, approached Upton. "Are you the spokesman for the white Caucasian race?," asked Upton. Binning replied he wasn't. Upton asked who is and indicated he would wait for those in charge. More police arrived and positioned themselves on opposite ends of the street, where demonstrators refused to move the car and lined up shoulder to shoulder. Majors Fred Dumigan and Fred Sliman approached Upton and the demonstrators and requested the car be removed. "You White devil," Upton shouted, "either you or I are going to die today!"

Accounts differ depending on who fired first. According to Captain Bryan Clemmons Jr., a fistfight broke out between the demonstrators and the officers. He saw one militant demonstrator appear to retrieve a pistol from his coat ready to begin firing. Baton Rouge Police Chief Eddie O. Bauer stated he did not who fired first, but later believed the supposed leader of the confrontation pulled a shotgun from the trunk of the Cadillac. Clemmons Jr. stated, "I was probably the first one to fire ... It was a nickel-plated revolver. It was the only gun I saw. We shot him before he ever got a chance to fire.

An account attributed to Henry Baptiste had him stating he had seen individuals firing shotguns and pistols at the police. Two weeks later, Baptiste told Jet magazine that he was misquoted. He explained, "I was on the left side of the street and Blacks and Whites were on the right side. A shot fired from the right side of the street. I don't know who fired first."

Within one minute, police officers had fired at the crowd, leaving five black demonstrators injured on the ground. The crowd threw rocks, bottles, and bricks at the officers, injuring several in the process. According to one account, a militant waved his hands and marched while limping towards the officers. He was ordered to halt but continued to press forward. Officers then his him with a nightstick and the butt of a gun. Another deputy sprayed him with Mace, but he continued to move toward the officers until he collapsed.

The officers called in ambulance to help the injured. When the confrontation ended, two policemen, Deputies Ralph Hancock and DeWayne Wilder, had been fatally shot with .38 caliber handguns used by police, as were Upton and Thomas Davis, who were also killed. A theory proposed by Time magazine alleged that Upton's men grabbed the handguns used by the police, and then used them against the officers. Of the 31 injured, 14 were police. Twelve black demonstrators were also injured. No weapons belonging to the demonstrators were recovered after the incident.

After the incident, Larry Mobley, also identified as Lonnie X, was reported to be in critical condition when admitted into the Earl K. Long Medical Center. Seventeen days later, on January 27, Mobley died of a gunshot wound to the abdomen and pneumonia, bringing the death count up to 5. By then, Johnson was in critical condition before he fell into a coma. By May 1975, three years and five months after the shooting, Johnson recovered from a coma, but remained incapacitated due to brain damage leaving him paralysed on the right side of his body. He had a small degree of response on the left side. His wife Claudia stated, "He's retained his memory, but he does not know what happened to him. He's not unhappy, so I know he's not aware of his condition." On January 29, 2011, Johnson died in a Baton Rouge hospice, at the age of 77.

=== Aftermath ===
In the aftermath, Louisiana Governor John McKeithen ordered 700 members of the Louisiana National Guard to patrol the streets to quell intercity tensions. Baton Rouge Mayor-President Woodrow Wilson "W. W." Dumas conferred with Governor McKeithen and parish officials, and imposed a 5:30 PM to 6:00 AM curfew. The curfew was extended to January 11, where the streets were ordered to be cleared by 9:30 PM. By then, 46 people had been arrested in violation of the curfew. On January 13, the East Baton Rouge Parish School Board announced public schools would be closed due to the tensions. The curfew was lifted on January 14.

After the demonstrators' arrests, an itinerary was found in their hotel room by the BRPD, indicating they had left Chicago in November 1971. At certain points along the cross-country trip, the group had split into pairs, with one set sometimes forming an advance party. Their tour began in Rochester, New York before arriving in New Orleans on December 31. Despite the alleged ties, Elijah Muhammad, the leader of the Nation of Islam (NOI), issued a statement in Muhammad Speaks, a Black Muslim publication, denying any connection his organization had with the members.

== Legal proceedings ==
=== Criminal case ===
On January 11, 1972, eight men were charged with murder and inciting to riot. The men accused were named: Lawrence Brooks, Robert Barber, David McKinney, Toussaint L'Ouverture Hale, Clennon Brown, Warren Hall, Ramon Eames and Ridgley Williams Jr. All but seven defendants ranged from ages 21 to 25. Baton Rouge District Judge Donovan W. Parker set a $500,000 bond for each individual. On February 10, the East Baton Rouge Parish Grand Jury indicted 14 men each with two counts of murder, and along with an additional man, two counts for inciting to riot where death occurred. By February 1973, twelve Muslims were deemed competent to stand trial, while one was still at large and the other declared legally insane. That same month, District Attorney Ossie Brown scheduled the trial to begin on March 26 before Judge Elmo Lear. Brown also indicated all twelve Muslims would be tried together.

On February 20, public defender Murphy Bell filed a motion for a change of venue, alleging that the defendants "cannot receive a fair trial here, principally because of the publicity" of the shooting. It was also reported that 300 prospective jurors had been called into court to determine whether the defendants were guilty or not, and if they can receive a fair trial in Baton Rouge. On February 26, Judge Lear ruled the trial will be held Baton Rouge after 60 prospective jurors had been questioned in court. Out of the 60 jurors, 38 had claimed they did not have a fixed opinion about the case or held strong opinions that they could not pull them aside and listen to evidence impartially.

On May 7, 1973, Judge Lear denied defense motions for a new trial. He then sentenced each of the nine men to a maximum prison sentence of 21 years, with automatic credit applied to time already served. Of the remaining four, three were awaiting trial and one had not been arrested. The defendants' public defenders had pledged to appeal their convictions. On March 31, 1975, the Louisiana Supreme Court overturned the convictions and ordered a new trial for the defendants, on a 4–3 ruling. In his majority opinion, Justice John Allen Dixon accused Judge Lear of unfairly determining whether the defendants received a fair trial by depriving the defendants' legal motion for a change in venue or trial location. On September 22, Judge Lear postponed the retrial due to the attorneys not having sufficient time to prepare their defense.

On November 20, 1975, Dudley Patrick Beavers, the last known Black Muslim involved in the killings, was arrested in Houston, Texas and held in Harris County Jail on a $150,000 bond.

In April 1976, Judge Lear began defense motion hearings for the nine Black Muslims. On April 23, Lear threw out the murder charges filed against the defendants due to the district attorney's office taking no actions on the charges within the three-year limit. Assistant District Attorney Ralph Roy objected to Lear's actions stating he would seek a review with the Louisiana Supreme Court. Because of this, defense attorneys Bert Garraway and Samuel Dickens sought to have the charges of inciting to riot against the defendants dismissed. He pointed to the Code of Criminal Procedure that forbids further prosecution of any charge arising from the same facts involved in the same case. In response, Lear gave the prosecution and the defense to hand him written arguments by the next week for consideration. On May 27, Lear denied to have the charges for inciting to riot dismissed. He gave the prosecution until June 9 to seek a review to have the murder charges against the defendants.

=== Retrial ===
On June 11, the Louisiana Supreme Court denied to have the inciting to riot charges dismissed, and approved for the retrial to proceed. By mid-June, jury selection began with 300 Baton Rouge citizens summoned to court to testify as potential jurors.

On July 2, the nine Black Muslims were convicted of inciting to riot and participating in a riot, with the jury verdict voting 10–2 after deliberating for more than four hours. By this point, five of the nine defendants had been released on bail. The next week, on July 8, the defendants were sentenced to 21 years in prison, with credit applied to time already served.
