= 1999 Family History Library shooting =

Mass shooting in Utah, US

Family History Library shooting
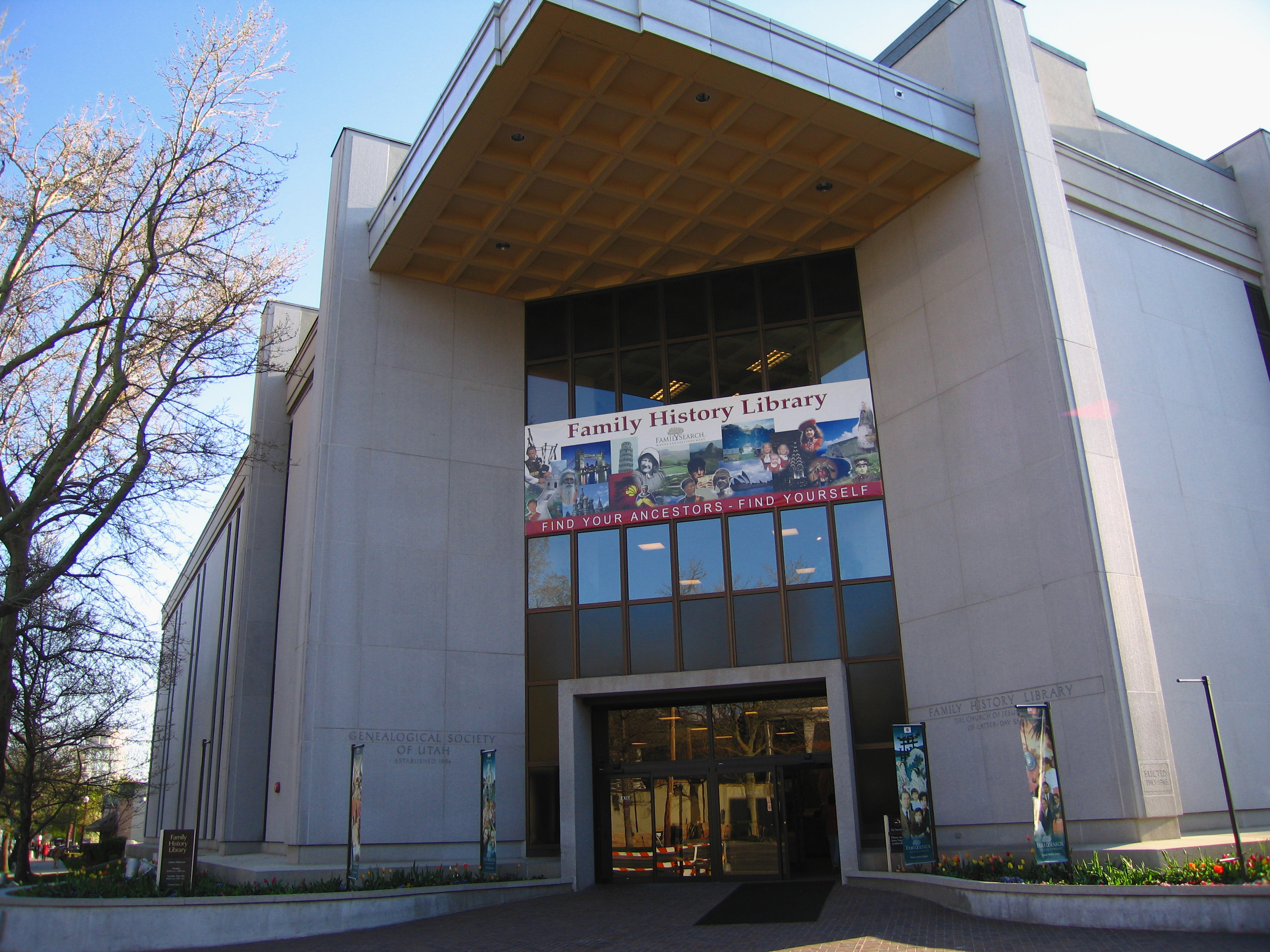
- The Family History Library, photographed in 2006
- Location: 40.7704°N 111.894253°W; 35 North West Temple Street, Salt Lake City, Utah, US
- Date: April 15, 1999 c. 10:30 a.m. (UTC -7)
- Attack type: Mass shooting
- Weapon: .22-caliber Ruger pistol
- Deaths: 3 (including the perpetrator)
- Injuries: 5
- Perpetrator: Sergei Babarin

The Family History Library shooting was a mass shooting that occurred on April 15, 1999, at the Family History Library, a genealogy research facility operated by The Church of Jesus Christ of Latter-day Saints in Salt Lake City, Utah, United States. At approximately 10:30 a.m. local time, a 70-year-old gunman entered the library’s lobby and opened fire, killing a church security officer and a visiting patron and wounding several others before being fatally shot by responding law enforcement officers. The shooting prompted the evacuation and temporary lockdown of surrounding buildings in downtown Salt Lake City amid fears of additional attacks. The incident occurred five days before the Columbine High School massacre in Colorado on April 20, 1999, and was later cited in retrospective coverage as part of a series of high-profile mass shootings in the United States that year.

== Shooting ==
On the morning of April 15, 1999, the gunman entered the lobby of the Family History Library shortly after it opened and began firing a handgun at people inside the building. A church security officer was shot and killed while attempting to intervene, and a visiting patron was fatally wounded. Several other individuals were injured as patrons and staff fled or sought cover throughout the building. Law enforcement officers, including city police and SWAT units, responded quickly and engaged the shooter in an exchange of gunfire. The suspect was shot by police and later died from his injuries while being transported to a hospital. The deceased victims were 62-year-old library security guard Donald Thomas and 55-year-old library visitor Irene Frengs.

== Perpetrator ==
The shooter was identified as Sergei Babarin, a 70-year-old man from the Salt Lake City area. Authorities reported that Babarin had a documented history of mental illness, including schizophrenia, and had reportedly stopped taking prescribed medication prior to the attack. Investigators stated that no clear ideological or political motive was established, and the shooting appeared to be a lone-actor attack. Law enforcement officials indicated that Babarin acted alone and that there was no ongoing threat following his death.

== Aftermath ==
The shooting prompted the evacuation and temporary lockdown of multiple nearby buildings in downtown Salt Lake City, including offices affiliated with the church, as authorities searched for potential additional threats. The Family History Library was closed for several days following the attack. The incident occurred five days before the Columbine High School massacre in Colorado, and later reporting frequently referenced it as part of a broader wave of mass shootings in the United States during 1999. In the aftermath, security measures at church-owned facilities were reviewed and increased, including changes to access control and on-site security presence.

== See also ==
- Clovis library shooting – another mass shooting at a library, which occurred in 2017
- Crime in Utah
- 2025 Grand Blanc Township church attack – another attack targeting an LDS site
- List of mass shootings in the United States (1900–1999)
