= 1972 Cherry Hill shooting =

Mass shooting in New Jersey, US

- Location: 39.92799°N 74.99434°W; Cherry Hill, New Jersey, US
- Date: June 21, 1972; 2:33 p.m. ET
- Target: Male employees and co-workers at Key Personnel Incorporated and the Heil Process Equipment Corporation
- Attack type: Mass shooting; murder–suicide; workplace shooting
- Weapon: Two sawed-off .22 caliber Armalite AR-7 semi-automatic rifles
- Deaths: 7 (including the perpetrator)
- Injuries: 7 (6 from gunfire, one from jumping out a window)
- Perpetrator: Edwin James Grace Jr.
- Motive: Revenge over his anger with employment agency

The 1972 Cherry Hill shooting is a mass shooting that occurred inside the multi-business Heritage Building in Cherry Hill, New Jersey, United States, on June 21, 1972. The perpetrator, 33-year-old Edwin James Grace Jr., entered the building armed with two sawed-off rifles and shot a dozen men inside the business building after failing to apply for an application with Key Personnel Incorporated, killing six and injuring six others, including the company's president.

Grace attempted to take his own life after the shooting and died after shooting himself elsewhere in the body hours after arriving at Cherry Hill Medical Center. The shooting itself, known as "12 Minutes of Chaos", was marked one of the worst mass shootings in New Jersey's history.

== Background ==
The Heritage building, located on 383 Kings Highway North in Cherry Hill Township, houses a total of eight businesses and 16 offices, including Key Personnel Incorporated and the Heil Process Equipment Corporation. The building, as of 2026, currently houses the Bratton Law Group.

== Shooting ==
Shortly after 2:00 p.m. ET, Grace left the Saxony Motel on the Black Horse Pike in Turnersville, New Jersey, with his tan 1970 Volkswagen Type 3 fastback. After Grace entered Cherry Hill Township, he drove to the back lot of the building, parked his Volkswagen, and entered the building armed with two sawed-up rifles with 120 rounds of ammunition. Grace, at the time, wore dark blue uniform pants, a black trench coat, a light blue shirt, a black tie, black shoes, a slight mustache, a Dick Tracy straw hat, a dog tag reading his birth year "1939", a navy-blue blazer with the emblem of the civil division of Essex County, New York court logo on the breast pocket, and a gun belt.

At 2:33 p.m. ET, Grace entered the building through a rear entrance, walked up a short flight of stairs, and entered the second floor armed with the two rifles. He spared the female employees by waving them out of the way, and fired at the male employees. As they pleaded for their lives, Grace fatally shot his first victim, 41-year-old Steven Bernard Robinson, the CEO of Key Personnel, in the head. He then shot two more employees, and a third escaped by leaping through a window while Grace reloaded his weapons. Grace walked upstairs and straight through the hallways before continuing to open fire on the employees. Some employees hid under tables while some other jumped out windows. Grace walked to the first floor where he continued to shoot at workers until he made his way down to the basement. After entering the basement, Grace attempted to take his own life by shooting himself in the head. At 2:45 p.m. ET, Grace pulled the trigger and shot himself in the head, but as officers arrived, officers lobbed seven canisters of tear gas into the two-story colonial building with its 16 offices before taking Grace into custody. A total of 70 bullets were fired during the shooting.

After Grace was taken to the Cherry Hill Medical Center, Grace didn't speak a single word to law enforcement officers or medical staff. He died from his injuries on July 8, 1972.

== Victims ==
A total of 12 men were shot by Grace, killing six and injuring six others. Many of the victims were Key Personnel employees, with one of the deceased being the president of the company, and one of the injured being a Heil Process employee.

=== Killed ===
- Steven Bernard Robinson, 41, of Cinnaminson, New Jersey, president of Key Personnel
- Robert Bertone, 22, of Delanco, New Jersey
- Joseph A. DiPalma, 44, of Cherry Hill, New Jersey
- Joseph Boyd, 48, of Mount Laurel, New Jersey
- Theodore G. Hall, 38, of Willingboro, New Jersey
- Charles R. Merkel, 38, of Cherry Hill, New Jersey

=== Injured ===
- Charles Collins Jr., 23, of Pennsauken, New Jersey
- Walter Wilks, 46, of Levittown, Pennsylvania
- Wayne Stroup, 21, of Cherry Hill, New Jersey
- Val Rishko, 25, of Groveville, New Jersey
- Bill Maynard, 25, of Marlton, New Jersey
- Glen Davis, 23, of Moorestown, New Jersey
- James Slemmer, 44, of Haddonfield, New Jersey
- James Ashmen, 24, of Cherry Hill, New Jersey (injured from jumping out of a window)

== Perpetrator ==
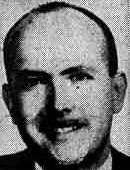
Edwin James Grace Jr.

Edwin James Grace Jr. (January 29, 1939 – July 8, 1972), was born in the Madison neighborhood of Brooklyn, New York. Grace graduated from James Madison High School in June 1956. Three months later, he entered St. Francis College but dropped out in the middle of his sophomore year in January 1958. He spent most of his adult life working for the Pinkerton Protective Agency in Essex County, New York, but joined the United States Army for a few years, including a tour around Okinawa.

In May 1970, Grace wrote to the Judicial Conference, seeking reinstatement and the conference double-checked with Howard Tyson, director of the administration of the Civil Court, saying that Tyson did not want him reinstated. In 1971, Grace quit Pinkerton to work for civil court in Essex. During his last four months, he worked out of its Camden, New Jersey office until the murders. A few days prior to the shooting, Grace went back to his home in Brooklyn to see his family for the last time in their East Flatbush home before leaving the state in a white Volkswagen. After they had departed, Grace began suffering mental health issues. Interviews from neighbors confirmed that "he didn't know what he did for a living". One neighbor told the Daily News that there's "not a single soul who knew him who has a bad word to say about him or his family".

On August 30, 1971, Grace joined as a uniformed security guard for Rochdale Village Inc. in Trenton, New Jersey, but was fired on December 30, 1971, for "excessive absence" because of a family emergency involving his ailing father. He fled back to New York for several months before returning to New Jersey on April 7, 1972, and brought back his Pinkerton job.

== Investigation ==
After the shooting, police officers entered the Turnersville motel room where Grace stayed prior to the shooting. According to investigators, Grace's room was reported as "dingy" with stucco and paneling on the walls. The handles on the chest of drawers were broken, and the mirror was completely faded. Inside the broken chests contains a $63.69 insurance bill that was due 10 days prior to the shooting, as well as two bottles of aspirin gun-stocks, barrel extensions, more ammunition, and two books. One of the two books was titled New Day, Adventure from the Bible and the other being My Way of Life. The clock radio was unplugged and a gray suit hung limply from a wire hanger in the closet. Police also investigated his Volkswagen, that was purchased by Grace in New York, sitting at the parking lot of the Heritage Building. Inside, investigators found a Pinkerton badge on his seat, and a map in his car with large X's over Cherry Hill and Pennsauken.

Police later recovered a card that was written by Grace himself, all taped on a metal frame of the motel's mailbox, that was written hours before the shooting, reading: "Beyond this place of wrath and tears looms but the horror of the shade, and yet the menace of the years finds, and shall find me unafraid. It matters not how strait the gate, how charged with punishments the scroll, I am the master of my fate. I am the captain of my soul." The word "Invictus" was written underneath the message, with the word being Latin for "unconquered". Despite the shooting not being ruled out as androcide nor motivated by misandry, authorities confirmed that Grace targeted his male employees as an act of workplace revenge over his frustration on his employment agency.

== See also ==
- Crime in New Jersey
- List of mass shootings in the United States (1900–1999)
