= 2025 Grand Blanc Township church attack =

Mass shooting and arson attack in Michigan, US

- Location: 42.9096°N 83.6212°W; The Church of Jesus Christ of Latter-day Saints, Grand Blanc Township, Michigan, U.S.
- Date: September 28, 2025 c. 10:25 – 10:33 a.m. (EDT; UTC−04:00)
- Target: Churchgoers
- Attack type: Mass shooting; mass murder; vehicle-ramming attack; arson; hate crime
- Weapons: AK-47; Pistol (unused); SKS (unused); 12-gauge semi-automatic shotgun (unused); 2008 GMC Sierra pickup truck; Improvised explosive devices and incendiaries
- Deaths: 5: 2 by smoke inhalation; 3 by gunfire (including the perpetrator)
- Injuries: 8: 3 by smoke inhalation; 5 by gunfire
- Perpetrator: Thomas Jacob Sanford
- Motive: Anti-Mormon sentiment

On the morning of September 28, 2025, a mass shooting and arson attack occurred at a meetinghouse of the Church of Jesus Christ of Latter-day Saints (LDS Church) in Grand Blanc Township, Michigan, United States. The perpetrator, 40-year-old Thomas Jacob Sanford, rammed his pickup truck into the front wall of the chapel, then exited the vehicle and opened fire on the congregation with an AK-47-style rifle. At some point Sanford set the building on fire, likely using gasoline as an accelerant, which destroyed most of it. Four church members were killed and eight injured. Two were shot dead and two died in the fire. Sanford was killed by police after a shootout in the building's parking lot three minutes and 47 seconds after the officers were dispatched.

The Michigan office of the Federal Bureau of Investigation (FBI) said the attack was being investigated as an "act of targeted violence". FBI director Kash Patel said that Sanford reportedly "hated people of the Mormon faith" and a Burton City Council candidate told reporters that Sanford called LDS Church members "the antichrist" when the two had met a week before the attack. Friends said Sanford's frequently expressed animosity toward church members began after a relationship with a LDS woman more than a decade earlier ended badly.

== Background ==
The attack occurred at the LDS Church's Grand Blanc Stake Center in Grand Blanc Township, Michigan, a suburb of Flint in Genesee County. The building was the headquarters of seven individual LDS Church congregations, called wards, that combine to form a unit called a stake. In addition to being used for special events involving multiple wards, the building served as the meetinghouse for the Grand Blanc Ward, with about 150 weekly attendees.

The building was dedicated in September 1981 with a ceremony hosted by former Michigan governor George W. Romney. His son, Mitt Romney, said a cousin attended services there until a recent ward boundary change placed her in another meetinghouse. As of 1996, the building had a capacity of approximately 1,100 and was located on a 13-acre (5.3 ha) parcel of land.

The attack took place one day after the death of the church's president, Russell M. Nelson. Early investigators noted the short time between Nelson's death and the attack on the meetinghouse. It was the first shooting at an LDS Church meetinghouse since a July 2018 shooting in Fallon, Nevada, which left one person dead and another injured.

Two other high-profile fatal shootings occurred within weeks before the attack: the assassination of right-wing political activist Charlie Kirk; and a shooting at an Immigration and Customs Enforcement facility that killed two immigrant detainees by an assailant with alleged "anti-ICE" motives. It was in this politically charged landscape that early speculations about Sanford's motives centered on his party affiliation and political identity. Some of his friends described him as a right-wing Republican, though law enforcement officials and those who knew him did not believe that he had been motivated by politics, but rather his reported animosity toward the LDS Church and its members.

This was not the first shooting at a place of worship this year in Michigan: in Wayne, about an hour south of Grand Blanc, a church had been attacked during Sunday worship by a heavily armed lone shooter in June, with over 100 people inside. One churchgoer was wounded and the shooter was killed by security.

== Attack ==
The attack began at approximately 10:25 a.m. EDT. Witnesses reported that Sanford rammed his GMC Sierra pickup truck into a brick wall on the south side of the building, directly beneath the steeple. He then exited the vehicle armed with an assault rifle and opened fire on a church service attended by hundreds of people, including children. Witnesses reported that Sanford was wearing camouflage pants. A church member recounted hearing a big bang that forced the doors open. Another member, while helping elderly people into a vehicle to escape, saw Sanford deliberately target the vehicle. At some point Sanford set the building on fire, likely using gasoline as an accelerant, destroying most of the building and killing two church members inside. Grand Blanc Township firefighters extinguished the fire sometime between noon and 1 p.m.; by 8 p.m. the bodies of both church members killed in the fire had been recovered.

Grand Blanc Township Police Chief William Renye initially reported that a Michigan Department of Natural Resources conservation officer and a Grand Blanc Township police officer arrived within 30 seconds of the first 911 call. Renye then said the officers killed Sanford during an exchange of gunfire in the parking lot within eight minutes of the first call. On October 3, the township police department released a 47-second video captured by the body camera of one of the responding officers. Reyne said a review of call logs and the footage showed that only 3 minutes and 47 seconds had elapsed between the two officers receiving the call from dispatch and killing Sanford. The department accordingly released an updated timeline:

- 10:25:32 — the first 911 call was received from a person reporting they had been shot in the stomach
- 10:25:48 — a 911 dispatcher notified the Grand Blanc Township police of the incident
- 10:27:46 — the natural resources officer arrived on scene
- 10:28:54 — the township officer arrived on scene

The video begins with the sound of multiple shots being fired and one officer telling the other "I got your back back here, man." The second officer can then be heard commanding Sanford to drop his gun and get on the ground. The first officer then told the other to shoot Sanford, after which two shots are heard—both fired by the conservation officer, according to investigators. The video shows a man wearing a suit, believed to be a congregation member, running toward Sanford carrying a handgun, then stopping to take aim but not firing. The video ends with both officers approaching Sanford, who is lying motionless in the parking lot.

== Victims ==
Four church members were killed. Two were killed by gunfire; one was pronounced dead at the scene and the other died at nearby Henry Ford Genesys Hospital. Two victims died in the fire; both bodies were recovered after the fire was extinguished. The ages of the victims who had been killed or wounded ranged from 6 to 78 years.

Eight surviving church members were admitted to Henry Ford Genesys Hospital, five for gunshot wounds and three for smoke inhalation. By the evening of the attack, six of them were listed in stable condition and two critical; one of the critical patients had suffered multiple gunshot wounds to the chest and abdomen, the other an abdominal wound. The latter man's 6-year-old son was treated for a gunshot wound to his arm, transferred to a different hospital, and released within a few days. One man listed in stable condition had a gunshot wound in the leg. Two of the patients treated for smoke inhalation were discharged by the next day, while one who could not breathe without assistance remained intubated. An additional victim was treated for smoke inhalation at McLaren Healthcare and released the next day.

A church member who died at the scene from gunfire was married, 72-year-old former LDS bishop Craig Hayden. One of his daughters, who was present during the attack, wrote on social media that as Sanford approached while she knelt over her dying father, she looked into his eyes and "forgave him right there", adding that she "saw pain, he felt lost [...] I forgave him not in words, but with my heart." Another daughter said her sister's post helped her to also forgive Sanford, saying, "I prayed for the man that took my father's life and I told him he is forgiven [...] I can tell you first hand it is actually very easy."

77-year-old US Navy veteran of the Vietnam War John Bond, was identified by his family as one of the victims who had been shot and killed. The other two church members who died were 54-year-old Thelma Armstrong, originally from South Africa and 77-year-old Pat Howard.

Two of the men wounded during the attack were fourth-year emergency medicine residents at Genesys Hospital. Both were Utah natives who had done their undergraduate work at Brigham Young University, and both ran back into the burning building several times to help others escape. One of the two, who was then the chief of education for residents, required extended treatment for smoke inhalation. A nurse who worked with him told reporters, "He wasn't going to not run in there. That's not him." Noting that he had served in the military, she added, "It's in his tactical training to do that." The other resident and his 6-year-old daughter were both wounded by bullet fragments as he was helping her and his wife escape through a window. He was the chief of residents at the time. The medical chief of staff at the hospital called them "absolute heroes" for "going in and out of the fire to drag people out, helping each other take care of the victims on the scene".

== Perpetrator ==
The attacker was identified as Thomas Jacob Sanford, a 40-year-old Iraq War veteran from Burton, Michigan. Sanford was born on July 29, 1985, and raised in Atlas Township, Michigan. After graduating from Goodrich High School in May 2004, he joined the Marines in June 2004 and was stationed in Okinawa, Japan. He earned recognition for his rifle marksmanship and achieved the rank of sergeant before being deployed to Fallujah, Iraq, in August 2007. His roles in Iraq were to repair military transport vehicles and equipment, and be a "vehicle recovery operator" responsible for retrieving armored troop support vehicles. He returned to the U.S. in March 2008 and was discharged three months later. Sanford and his wife were married in 2016 by Sanford's father, an ordained minister. The couple had at least one child, a son, who underwent multiple surgeries in 2015 to treat a rare genetic disorder, causing significant financial stress. Sanford reportedly said at the time that caring for his sick son was the "most unique thing to deal with" compared to his military service and Iraq deployment.

=== Motive for attack ===
According to friends and acquaintances, Sanford had been in a relationship with a devout LDS woman while residing in Park City, Utah, more than a decade before the attack. He had reportedly felt "pressured" to join the church but resisted, and the relationship ended badly. One friend—who described Sanford as his best friend since preschool—said that Sanford returned to Michigan in mental "rough shape" and frequently expressed animosity toward LDS Church members. "He got this whole fascination with Mormons, and they are the Antichrist, and they are going to take over the world", the friend said. The same friend said Sanford's time in Iraq and heavy methamphetamine use seemed to have changed him even more from the "class clown" persona of his youth.

Burton city council candidate Kris Johns said he had spoken to Sanford while canvassing less than a week before the shooting. Johns said that he and Sanford were discussing gun rights when Sanford asked Johns, "What do you know about Mormons?" Sanford identified himself as a Christian and expressed his concerns about LDS Church members and their beliefs for nearly 15 minutes in what Johns described as controlled and calm tones. The Detroit Free Press called it a "tirade against the church", saying that Sanford described LDS Church members as "the antichrist". The same article also quoted Johns saying that Sanford was "extremely polite" and that "it was very much standard anti-LDS talking points that you would find on YouTube" and social media. Johns told CBS News that Sanford said that Mormons "believe they're above Jesus", and that while he was dating the LDS woman in Utah, "they wanted me to get rid of my tattoos [...] to do all this stuff, and I wouldn't do it." In the same interview, Johns said Sanford "said nothing about Charlie Kirk, nothing about our current president or past president. He asked me about guns. I said I support the Second Amendment. We ended the conversation very positively."

== Aftermath ==
Nurses and emergency personnel on strike at Henry Ford Genesys Hospital heard the shooting while on the picket line and ran toward the church to help the first responders, and indicated their willingness to return to work if needed to care for the injured.

The Grand Blanc Police Department urged residents to avoid the crime scene. Police also set up a reunification site nearby. The Grand Blanc Community Schools, Atherton Community Schools, and Goodrich Area Schools closed all campuses in the school district on September 29.

A 21-year-old man from Flint was arrested after he drove his red Buick past barriers surrounding the church. The man had a long gun in the front seat. Law enforcement is trying to determine whether this was connected to the attack. The incident was reported the day after the attack but police did not specify when it occurred.

== Investigation ==
The acting special agent in charge of the FBI's Michigan office said the attack was being investigated as an "act of targeted violence". The day after the attack, White House press secretary Karoline Leavitt told Fox News, "From what I understand based on my conversations with the FBI director, all they know right now is this was an individual who hated people of the Mormon faith."

Sanford is believed to have set the fire that engulfed the church. The Bureau of Alcohol, Tobacco, Firearms and Explosives said it found four improvised explosive devices made of consumer-grade fireworks and smoke canisters stuck together inside the truck. Investigators searched Sanford's residence and sought warrants for his digital media to determine a motive.

On February 4, 2026, the Genesee County prosecutor said he would not be charging the officers who killed the gunman claiming that they acted in self defense. "Due to officer (redacted)'s and conservation officer (redacted)'s reasonable fear under these circumstances, they were legally entitled to use deadly force in lawful self-defense or defense of others."

== Reactions ==
=== Religious leaders ===
The bishop of the congregation that was attacked, Jeffrey Schaub, gave a video statement in which he expressed his gratitude for the outpouring of love and support he and his ward members had received from the community, saying, "It is the most significant time of my life where I have felt the love and prayer of other people. It's been very inspiring, the amount of contact we've had with friends not of our faith." Upon his return home in the late evening of the attack, Schaub said that his family had received dozens of meals and notes from neighbors and other community members. "It was very humbling to see how much good there is in the world today and that, above all, we are all children of the same Father in heaven, and we love each other. As you might expect, our members are quite shaken, in spirit and body. And it hurts." He continued by expressing that his congregation's faith was the key to recovering from their sorrow by saying, "I know that through our Savior, Jesus Christ, we can find joy again. I know that with his help, there can be healing. And I know that as we focus on him, we can have joy."

Dallin H. Oaks, then the LDS Church's senior apostle, said in a televised message to church members, "We mourn with our members who have lost loved ones", and that the attack "reminds us of our sacred responsibilities as followers of Jesus Christ." Oaks, who succeeded Nelson as president of the church two weeks later, remembered him as a "dear friend and cherished leader [whose] timeless teachings continue to guide us and help us find comfort amid suffering". He added, "we join in prayer for comfort with others around the world who are suffering from similar tragedies".

Former Utah senator Mitt Romney, son of former Michigan governor George W. Romney, told reporters: "I think we are overwhelmingly affected by the loss of life and the injury, and that's what comes first. And then secondarily, the sadness of people targeting people of faith, of any faith, for violence." Mitt said one of his cousins attended services at the Grand Blanc Stake Center until a recent ward boundary change placed her in another meetinghouse. Speaking of his cousin's close relationships with members who were still attending her old meetinghouse, Romney said, "an attack on a religious institution where people are worshiping is unimaginable, unthinkable and inexcusable". He also mourned the loss of Nelson the day before the attack, recalling a feeling of being "bathed" in Nelson's "simple kindness" whenever they met. Romney said that Nelson's last address to church members referenced the words of Christ in the New Testament, "Blessed are the peacemakers." "And so he talked about looking for peace, looking for ways to bring down the temperature, and how prescient that was", Romney said.

Catholic Bishop Earl Boyea, within whose diocese the Grand Blanc Stake Center is located, offered his condolences, saying, "Any place of worship should be a sanctuary of peace. The violation of such a haven, especially upon a Sunday morning, makes yesterday's act of mass violence even more shocking." Detroit Archbishop Edward Weisenburger posted on his social media account, "In this time of immense sorrow, I ask that we stand in solidarity with the victims, their families, and the Church of Jesus Christ of Latter-day Saints. Let us pray for peace and stability in our world and let us commit ourselves to actions that help to create that peace."

=== Politicians ===
Michigan governor Gretchen Whitmer condemned the shooting, saying her "heart is breaking for the Grand Blanc community", and ordered flags to be flown at half-mast. She also cautioned members of the public against engaging in unhelpful and potentially dangerous speculation about the shooter's motives, asking them to "lower the temperature of rhetoric" that might hinder the ongoing investigation. "Keep your loved ones close, keep this community close to your hearts," Whitmer added.

President Donald Trump called the attack "another targeted attack on Christians in the United States of America". U.S. Attorney General Pam Bondi called it "heartbreaking and chilling". FBI director Kash Patel denounced the shooting as a "cowardly and criminal act" and confirmed the FBI was tracking the situation.

=== Community members ===
In a phone interview with reporters, Sanford's father, Thomas Sanford Sr., apologized to the victims' families, saying, "I feel terrible about all the families that have been hurt and they're under the same crap that I'm going under, that my wife and I are going under. I apologize for that." When asked for insight into his son's motives, Thomas Sr. said, "The only thing I can say is that it was my son that did it. As far as why? Irrelevant. It happened. We're dealing with it. It's been a nightmare." In another statement to the press, Thomas Sr. called his son a devoted family man who loved his country, and said his family was "completely in shock" over his actions. He added "we grieve our loss and those of the others" and said they were praying for the victims' families. One of the Sanfords' close friends also expressed difficulty reconciling the "fun-loving family guy" she knew with his actions, saying, "How do you mourn the death of someone who did something so terrible?" Acknowledging that Sanford "harbored unkind feelings toward certain groups", the friend said, "If you asked me out of everybody I know to pick 10 people you think might do something like this, I wouldn't not pick him. And I hate saying that."

=== Fundraisers ===
Online fundraisers for the widows of three church members killed in the attack reached their goals by October 2. A fourth fundraiser for the mother of two children killed in the attack was nearing its goal by the same day. Six online fundraisers were started on behalf of 11 church members wounded in the attack. A joint fundraiser between the Charles Stewart Mott Foundation and the Community Foundation of Greater Flint was organized on behalf of the victims and affected members of the broader community with an initial donation of $250,000 by the Mott Foundation.

Fiction author David J. Butler, an LDS church member from Utah, organized an online fundraiser for Sanford's family. The campaign garnered contributions from several thousands of individual donors, many of whom said they were also LDS. Butler said he was motivated by his faith to help Sanford's widow and children, especially their chronically ill son. "Jesus tells us that we should do this. We should love our enemies [...] we should mourn with those that mourn", Butler said. Sanford's father expressed gratitude for the gesture, writing in a text message, "I can't find any words to express our appreciation but the right time will eventually come, thank you so much." Butler said that he and Sanford's sister had a long phone conversation about how to distribute the donations to Sanford's family. "They are pretty moved that so many people have expressed love for them", he said, adding that both had wept during the conversation.

The fundraiser for Sanford's family has drawn criticism according to Butler, who said he has been called "evil" and "self-aggrandizing" and told he should be raising "money for the real victims". Deseret News also reported some similar responses, but said most had been "overwhelmingly positive". An LDS religious scholar told reporters such "radical displays of forgiveness" have become a commonly expressed ideal over the course of the church's history, in which members have been both victims and perpetrators of religious persecution. "Holding a grudge is like holding on to a burning coal with the intent of throwing it at someone else. And it just hurts you more than it hurts them", he said, adding, "forgiveness is a way to put that down". The fundraiser's organizer said this attitude was not unique to the LDS faith, noting that members of many faiths were contributing, as well as non-believers. "I think there’s also a story here that is a human story", he said.

== See also ==
- List of mass shootings in the United States in 2025
- Annunciation Catholic Church shooting; another mass shooting at a church in 2025
- Family History Library shooting; a mass shooting at an LDS genealogy facility
- List of attacks against Latter-day Saint churches
- List of cases of church arson
- The Church of Jesus Christ of Latter-day Saints in Michigan
- 2025 Southport shooting, which occurred a day earlier, also allegedly committed by an Iraq War veteran
