= 1995 Bronx shoe store shooting =

Mass shooting in New York, US

- Location: 40.856077°N 73.867353°W; Little Chester Shoes; Pelham Parkway, The Bronx, New York City, US
- Date: December 19, 1995; 11:50 a.m (Eastern Standard Time)
- Target: Little Chester Shoes
- Attack type: Mass shooting; mass murder; hostage taking; shootout
- Weapon: 9mm CZ 85 semi-automatic pistol
- Deaths: 5
- Injuries: 4 (including the perpetrator)
- Perpetrator: Michael Vernon
- Defender: Leonel Quinones
- Motive: Schizophrenia

On December 19, 1995, a mass shooting occurred at the Little Chester Shoes store on White Plains Road in the Pelham Parkway neighborhood in the Bronx borough of New York City, United States.

Michael Vernon, a 22-year-old former psychiatric patient with a history of paranoid schizophrenia, opened fired in the store with a 9mm pistol during a botched robbery and dispute over footwear, leaving five people dead and three others critically wounded.

== Shooting ==
The gunman, 22-year-old Michael Vernon, entered the shoe store at around 11:50 a.m. EST under the ruse of shopping for Nike sneakers.

When a store clerk informed him that they did not have the specific 13½ size or style of shoes he requested, Vernon pulled out a 16-round 9mm CZ 85 semi-automatic pistol and opened fire on employees and shoppers. Vernon systematically shot eight people, mostly targeting their heads, later stating he killed them to "eliminate witnesses".

A woman managed to escape and flag down a police vehicle. As Vernon tried to flee the store using a hostage as a shield, he engaged in a shootout with Highway Patrol Officer Leonel Quinones, who shot and wounded Vernon with a shotgun blast. Vernon, who was shot in the hand and groin, limped half a block before being tackled and apprehended by an off-duty officer.

== Victims ==
Killed:

- Kyong Bae (41): The wife of the store owner, who was celebrating her second wedding anniversary that day.
- Maria Carrasquillo (38): A mother shopping for shoes with her children.
- Rafael Gonzalez (12): Maria's youngest son, who was trying on sneakers when he was shot.
- Ricardo "Ricky" Gonzalez (14): Maria's older son.
- Henry William Lucerno Inga (27): A customer inside the shop.

Wounded:

- Juan Dones (22): A store clerk who was asked for the shoes before the shooting began.
- Jae Moon Cha (52): A visiting shoe retailer.
- Gonzalo Said Galvez (22): The cousin of deceased victim Henry Inga.

== Perpetrator ==
Michael Vernon (b. 1973) was a high school dropout with a history of drug problems and two prior felony convictions for assault. Relatives and medical records confirmed Vernon suffered from severe paranoid schizophrenia and was actively receiving outpatient psychiatric treatment. His common-law wife stated he had stopped taking his antipsychotic medication two days before the shooting.

While recovering at the Jacobi Medical Center, Vernon told detectives that in the last two years, he killed two taxicab drivers near his home, including Michael Feinman, 52, who was killed with a single shot to the head from a .32-caliber revolver in a stickup on November 3, 1993.

Police later seized a loaded Chinese-made AK-47 at Vernon's home in a North Bronx housing project. Vernon was charged with five counts of murder, four counts of assault, and one count of aggravated assault of a police officer.

Trial & imprisonment

During his trial, the defense argued that Vernon was legally insane. However, the prosecution proved he intentionally prepared for the shooting by upgrading his firearm a week prior for more ammo capacity.

On October 24, 1997, a jury found Vernon guilty of all five counts of first-degree murder and four counts of attempted murder. He was sentenced to life in prison without the possibility of parole.

== See also ==
- Freddy's Fashion Mart attack, a mass shooting that occurred in Harlem, Manhattan 11 days earlier
