= 1974 Olean High School shooting =

Mass shooting in Olean, New York, United States

Coordinates: 42°04′57″N 78°26′05″W

- Location: Olean, New York, United States
- Date: December 30, 1974; 2:50 p.m. – 5:20 p.m. (EST)
- Attack type: School shooting; mass shooting
- Weapons: .30-06 rifle with telescopic sight; • .22 rifle: 12-gauge shotgun; Smoke bomb; Molotov cocktail; Knife (unused)
- Deaths: 5 (including two unborn children)
- Injuries: 11 (7 by gunfire)
- Perpetrator: Anthony F. Barbaro
- Motive: Suicidal ideation
- Charges: Second-degree murder (3 counts); First-degree assault (6 counts); First-degree reckless endangerment (5 counts); (Charges dropped after perpetrator's death)

The Olean High School shooting was a school shooting that occurred on December 30, 1974, at Olean High School in Olean, New York, United States. The gunman, 17-year-old Anthony F. Barbaro, an honor student and member of the school's rifle team, indiscriminately shot at people on the street from windows at the third floor of the school building. Three people were shot dead, including a pregnant woman with twins, and another 11 people were injured during the shooting.

On November 1, 1975, Barbaro hanged himself in his cell at the Cattaraugus County Jail.

== Details ==
The incident began during the afternoon of December 30, 1974, when Barbaro left his house with his mother's car. He told his brother, Chris, that he was going target shooting. Barbaro arrived at Olean High School, which at the time was closed for Christmas break, at approximately 2:50 p.m. After leaving his car, he entered the school building through an opened side entrance and proceeded to the third floor where he set off a coke bottle filled with gasoline and a wick. Unable to open the locked door to the student council room, Barbaro shot off the lock, entered the student council room, and tied the door shut. A 12-man custodial crew was doing routine maintenance in the basement of the school at this time. When they heard a fire alarm sound, the superintendent dispatched Earl Metcalf to see what the problem was at the 3rd floor. He met Joe Kosidlo, the 3rd floor custodian, who asked him to vacate because he thought he heard gun shots. Mr. Metcalf did not listen and proceeded to where he heard the noise. Anthony Barbaro was then confronted by Earl Metcalf. Seeing Metcalf through the glass window of the student council room, he opened his door, shot and killed him. Barbaro then positioned himself in the student council room on the third floor of the school. There, he began shooting at people outside of the school.

Fire trucks began to respond to the fire alarm, then local police and finally New York State troopers. At this time there were no students present and only Principal Louis Nicol, secretaries, business office, maintenance and custodians were at the school. All but the Supt. secretary immediately went to the boiler room at the rear of the school. By 5:20 p.m., local and State Police officers were surrounding the school building, and a National Guard tank had arrived to remove the injured victims. Before night fall, two New York State Police entered the school and threw tear gas grenades into the student council room, where Barbaro was found unconscious inside the room wearing a defective gas mask. Barbaro was laid onto a stretcher and transported by ambulance to the hospital, examined and, having suffered no injuries, was then transferred to the Olean City Jail.

According to police, Barbaro had fired 31 shots. Three people were killed in the shooting, and eleven others were wounded. Those killed were Earl Metcalf, Neal Pilon, and Carmen Wright Drayton, who was six months pregnant. Earl Metcalf, 62, was killed inside the school building, while Columbia Gas Co. employee Neal Pilon, 58, was shot while crossing the street outside of the school. Carmen Wright, 25, was shot in the head inside her car while driving by the school. Both Pilon and Wright were pronounced "dead on arrival" at Olean General Hospital. Seven people survived the shooting with gunshot wounds, while four others sustained injuries from flying glass fragments. Eight of the wounded victims were Olean city firemen responding to a fire complaint at the school.

== Perpetrator and motives ==
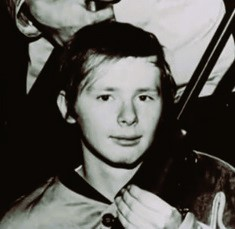
Anthony Barbaro

The perpetrator of the shooting was 17-year-old Anthony F. Barbaro (September 9, 1957 – November 1, 1975), a lifelong Olean resident. He had attended Olean High School, where he was an honor student and a star marksman on his school's rifle team. He ranked eighth highest academic score in his senior class, and was inducted into the National Honor Society in February 1974. He had also won a Regents Scholarship that December.

Those who knew Barbaro recall him as being quiet, and his school principal described him as "more of a loner than not." Louis Nicol, former principal of Olean High School, and present in the building at the time of shooting, said that Barbaro excelled scholastically and caused no disciplinary problems at school. Barbaro lived in Olean, New York, with his parents and his three younger siblings – sister Cecile, brothers Steven and Chris. His father was an executive of a successful manufacturing firm, while Anthony worked with his mother at a local fast-food restaurant. Barbaro had also shown an interest in engineering, and had hoped to become a scientist.

Police have found no apparent motives as to why Barbaro committed his crimes. A teammate of Barbaro on the school's rifle team recalls Barbaro having spoken of wanting to "hold up" the Olean Armory and engage in a police standoff. Barbaro had just tried out for the bowling team but did not qualify.

In a note explaining his motives, Barbaro wrote:

I guess I just wanted to kill the person I hate most – myself, I just didn't have the courage. I wanted to die, but I couldn't do it, so I had to get someone to do it for me. It didn't work out.

== Aftermath ==
On December 31, 1974, Anthony Barbaro was arraigned on three counts of second-degree murder, six counts of first-degree assault, and five counts of first-degree reckless endangerment. Barbaro was then being held without bail at the Olean City Jail. Following the shooting, police had found homemade smoke bombs, as well as gasoline and glass bottles, and empty propane canisters in Barbaro's bedroom. Police also found, in Barbaro's bedroom, bomb recipes and a journal that detailed his plans for the shooting. In April 1975, he had entered a plea of not guilty by reason of insanity, however, he was found competent to stand trial by two court-appointed psychiatrists. Barbaro was soon transferred from the Olean City Jail to the Cattaraugus County Jail in Little Valley. On October 21, 1975, a grand jury was seated for Barbaro's trial at the Olean Municipal Building.

On October 27, defense attorney Vincent E. Doyle Jr. presented his testimony at a preliminary hearing, stating that Barbaro had a "serious, deep-rooted mental illness that precluded his [Barbaro's] conviction". On November 1, 1975, Barbaro hanged himself with a bedsheet in his cell at the Cattaraugus County Jail. Cattaraugus County coroner Dr. Harry C. Law ruled the death a suicide. Barbaro had written three suicide notes that were found on his bed in his cell. One note was addressed to his family, another note was addressed to a woman he corresponded with in prison, and the third note was addressed "to whom it may concern".

The third note read:

People are not afraid to die; it's just how they die. I don't fear death, but rather the pain. But no more. I regret the foods I'll never taste, the music I'll never hear, the sites I'll never see, the accomplishments I'll never accomplish, in other words, I regret my life. Some will always ask, 'Why?' I don't know — no one will. What has been, can't be changed. I'm sorry. It ends like it began; in the middle of the night, someone might think it selfish or cowardly to take one's own life. Maybe so, but it's the only free choice I have. As I see it, I lose either way. If I'm found not guilty, I won't survive the pain I've caused — my guilt. If I'm convicted, I won't survive the mental and physical punishment of life in prison.

== Wounded victims ==
A total of eleven people survived the shooting with injuries.

- Albert J. Abdo, 37 — Olean
- Wayne L. Dutton — Hinsdale
- Wayne Dutton's son — Hinsdale
- Herbert Van Elmore, 43 — Olean
- William Robert Fromme, 35 — Olean
- David A. Grosse, 28 — Olean
- Captain Raymond C. Limerick, 40 — Olean
- Joseph John Snopkowski, 55 — Olean
- Earl R. Weidt, 23 — Olean
- George H. Williams — Olean
- Julius A. Wright, 12 — Portville

== In popular culture ==
The 1974 Olean High School shooting was mentioned in the 1981 film The Killing of America. The segment was about how Barbaro committed the shooting and later killed himself in his jail cell.

== See also ==
- List of school shootings in the United States by death toll
- List of school shootings in the United States (before 2000)
- List of mass shootings in the United States
- List of shootings in New York
