= Trang Dai massacre =

1998 mass shooting in Tacoma, WA

Coordinates: 47°13′22.3″N 122°26′34.7″W

- Location: Tacoma, Washington, U.S.
- Date: July 5, 1998; 28 years ago
- Deaths: 5
- Injuries: 5
- Motive: Asian gang warfare

The Trang Dai massacre in Tacoma, Washington, United States, occurred on July 5, 1998, when three gunmen entered the Trang Dai Cafe and opened fire, killing five customers and wounding five others. Detectives blamed the violence on warring Asian gangs.

== Incident ==
Just after 1:30 a.m. on July 5, 1998, three masked gunmen burst into the Trang Dai Cafe and opened fire in the karaoke bar, killing four men and wounding five others. Two other gunmen kept watch out back and killed a waitress as she tried to leave. In all, 41-57 shots were fired. The five killed were: Nhan Ai Nguyen, 26; Duy Le, 25; his brother, 27-year-old Hai Le; Tuong Hung Do, 33; and waitress Tuyen Vo, 21. Five were injured and eventually recovered from those injuries. Prosecutors claimed the suspects were targeting a patron, who was injured, because of a personal gripe. The crime remains one of Tacoma's worst mass slayings. Crime is believed to have started from numerous theft events in the community that lead to the Trang Dai Massacre.

== Investigation ==
On July 18, 1998, Tacoma police officers conducted a large police operation in which they searched nine homes while looking for eight suspects in the case. Four were arrested during the operation. A fifth was arrested the next day on July 19.

An AK-47 found at one of the suspects’ homes was traced back to Bull's Eye Shooter Supply, the same gun shop that was the source of the weapon used in the Beltway sniper attacks.

The suspected ringleader, 22-year-old Ri Le, killed his younger half-brother, 17-year-old Khanh Trinh, (one of the gunman stationed at the back of the cafe) then himself in a murder-suicide pact as police officers closed in. Another suspect, 18-year-old Samath Mom, committed suicide in jail just a few hours after his arrest. Four of the other five – Jimmie Chea, John Phet, Sarun Truck Ngeth and Marvin Leo were convicted of first-degree murder and sentenced to life without parole while Veasna Sok, was only convicted of first-degree manslaughter in a plea deal and sentenced to 6-1/2 years in prison. On October 30, 2020, John Phet (the other gunman stationed at the back of the cafe) was resentenced to 25 years to life due to Washington State banning sentences of life without parole for juvenile offenders.
