= David Esco Welch =

American mass murderer

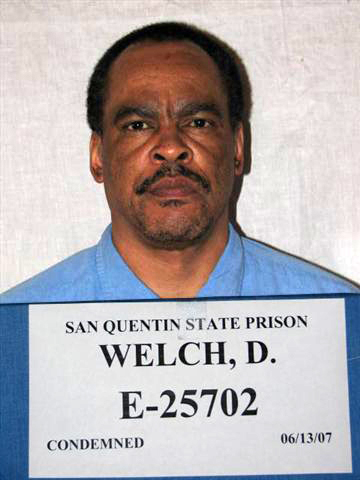
- Mugshot
- Born: 1957 or 1958 (age 68–69)
- Other name: "Moochie"
- Conviction: First degree murder (6 counts)
- Penalty: Death

Details
- Date: December 8, 1986
- Country: United States
- State: California
- Killed: 6
- Injured: 2
- Weapons: 9mm Uzi carbine; 6-shot .357 Magnum Smith & Wesson revolver; 6-shot .38-caliber Taurus revolver
- Date apprehended: December 9, 1986
- Imprisoned at: San Quentin State Prison

David Esco Welch (born 1957/1958) is an American mass murderer who shot and killed six people during a home invasion of his girlfriend's house in Oakland, California on December 8, 1986.

Welch was sentenced to death and remains on death row awaiting execution. A female accomplice, Rita Lewis, was given a sentence of 51 years to life imprisonment. The mass murder was considered the worst to occur in Oakland until it was surpassed by the 2012 Oikos University shooting.

== Early life ==
Welch and his siblings grew up in a socially disadvantaged environment, as his father was a violent alcoholic who took his anger out on his children and his wife. On numerous occasions between the ages of 6 and 12, Welch was whipped with an extension cord by his father. Once an adult, Welch perceived no drive to contribute to society and became a career criminal. At an unknown point, he raped his girlfriend.

Afterward, he befriended and began dating another girl, a teenager named Dellane Mabrey. The relationship eventually fell apart after Mabrey's mother clarified that she did not support their relationship. This caused Welch to start resenting the family, even more so when one of his two pet pit-bulls was hit and killed by a car while in the care of Mabrey's brothers.

== Murders ==
On the night of December 8, 1986, in rage over the breakup and his missing pit bull, Welch and his new girlfriend, 29-year-old Rita Lewis, broke into the Mabrey family residence on Pearmain Street in Oakland. At the time, four family members were present; Dellane Mabrey, 16, her daughter, Valencia Morgan, 3, and her brothers, Sean Orlando, 20, and Darnell, 24. Four other guests who present in the home, those being Kathy Walker, 24, Walker's son Dwayne Miller, 4, Dellane's new boyfriend Leslie Morgan, 24, and Morgan's son Dexter, 3. All of the guests were reportedly sleeping during the break-in.

Upon entering the home, Welch demanded the return of his pet. From there, Welch began ransacking the place and shooting his gun at the sleeping people, killing Dellane, Valencia, Sean Orlando, Darnell, Kathy, and Dwayne. He also wounded Leslie and Dexter, but both survived their wounds. After the killings, Welch and Rita fled the home. They were both arrested by a police assault team nine hours later.

== Aftermath ==
In 1989, a jury convicted Welch of six counts of first-degree murder, for which he received the death penalty, and shortly after was escorted to San Quentin State Prison to await execution. Rita Lewis was separately convicted for her participation in the murders, for which she was sentenced to 51-years to life imprisonment.

In May 2015, after spending 26 years on death row, Welch filed an appeal, in which he alleged that there were improper communications between trial court jurors and bailiffs. His attorneys also brought up the abuse that Welch had received as a child. The appeal was rejected. Capital punishment in California remains inactive after an imposed moratorium by governor Gavin Newsom, and executions have not been fulfilled in California since 2006. As of 2022, Welch remains on death row.

== See also ==
- List of death row inmates in the United States
- List of rampage killers
