= 1984 Palm Sunday massacre =

Mass shooting in New York, U.S.

- Location: 40.678203°N 73.869449°W; 1080 Liberty Avenue; East New York, Brooklyn, New York, U.S.
- Date: April 15, 1984; 42 years ago
- Attack type: Mass shooting; mass murder; home invasion
- Weapons: Two handguns (.22-caliber pistol, .38-caliber handgun)
- Deaths: 10
- Injuries: 0
- Perpetrator: Christopher Thomas
- Motive: Jealousy
- Convictions: First degree manslaughter (10 counts); Second degree criminal possession of a weapon

On April 15, 1984, a mass shooting occurred in Brooklyn, New York, United States. The event resulted in the deaths of ten people: two women, and eight children. There was one survivor, an infant girl. It was the deadliest mass shooting in New York until it was superseded by the 2009 Binghamton shooting.

== Shootings ==
All of the victims were shot, with a total of 19 bullets fired from two handguns at close range, most in the head, and were found in relaxed poses sitting in couches and chairs, suggesting that they had been taken by surprise. There were no signs of drugs or robbery at the home.

The sole survivor, an infant girl, was raised by her grandmother. Joanne Jaffe, at the time a "beat cop" and by 2014 the highest ranking female officer in the New York City Police Department, was assigned to the infant girl, and stayed in contact with her as she grew up. The girl lived with Jaffe starting at age 14. In 2014, after the death of the girl's grandmother, Jaffe adopted her at the age of 31.

== List of victims ==
- Betsy Bermudez, age 14 – sister of Marelyn Bermudez and daughter of homeowner Enrique Bermudez
- Marelyn Bermudez, age 10 – sister of Betsy Bermudez and daughter of homeowner Enrique Bermudez
- Eddie Lopez, age 7 – son of Virginia Perez and brother of Juan Enrique Lopez
- Juan Enrique Lopez, age 4 – son of Virginia Perez and brother of Eddie Lopez
- Virginia Perez, age 23 – mother of Eddie and Juan Enrique Lopez. She was also the girlfriend of homeowner Enrique Bermudez and was eight months pregnant with their child at the time of her murder.
- Alberto Maldonado, age 5 – son of Carmen Perez and brother of Noel Maldonado and half-brother of Christina Rivera, the sole survivor of the massacre.
- Noel Maldonado, age 4 – son of Carmen Perez and brother of Alberto Maldonado and half-brother of Christina Rivera, the sole survivor of the massacre.
- Carmen Perez, age 23 – mother of Alberto and Noel Maldonado and Christina Rivera, the sole survivor of the massacre and sister of Migdalia Perez.
- Maria Isabel Perez, age 10 – cousin of Carmen and Migdalia Perez
- Migdalia Perez, age 14 – sister of Carmen Perez and aunt of Alberto and Noel Maldonado and Christina Rivera.

== Legal proceedings ==
In 1985, Christopher Thomas was convicted on ten counts of manslaughter, but was cleared of murder charges. The jury had convicted him of intentional murder, but the charges were reduced due to "extreme emotional disturbance" and Thomas being high on drugs. Prosecutors said the motive was jealousy, claiming Thomas suspected his wife of having an affair with the home's owner, a convicted cocaine dealer named Enrique Bermudez. Thomas's wife testified her husband was "enraged" over finding her at the Bermudez residence without him and set fire to his and her shared residence when she told him she was leaving him. Bermudez claimed Thomas had once asked Bermudez to have sex with Thomas's wife, but Bermudez declined.

Other witnesses testified they had seen Thomas "looking bizarre" in or near the residence earlier on the day of the murders. Bermudez confirmed this, saying Thomas had visited him that morning asking for drugs and cash. When Bermudez asked about some $9,000 Thomas already owed him, Thomas reportedly promised a surprise.

Thomas was sentenced to from 83 to 250 years, but due to state law was expected to spend no more than 50 years in prison. He ended up serving just over 32 years before being released in 2018, having served two thirds of the maximum fifty years allowed by New York State.

=== Release from prison ===
In January 2018, Thomas was paroled from prison, after being incarcerated for nearly 34 years. The early release is credited to the sentence being reduced to manslaughter after he was found to have been under the influence of drugs at the time.

== See also ==
- Mass shootings in the United States
- List of shootings in New York
- List of massacres in the United States
- List of disasters in New York City by death toll
