= Russell Lee Smith =

- Born: Russell Lee Smith; February 6, 1947; Bessemer, Alabama, U.S.
- Died: May 24, 1975 (aged 28); Dayton, Ohio, U.S.
- Cause of death: Suicide by gunshot

Details
- Date: May 24, 1975; 1:30 a.m. – 2:22 a.m.
- Locations: Dayton, Ohio, United States
- Killed: 3 (including himself)
- Injured: 11
- Weapon: .38-caliber revolver

Russell Lee Smith (February 6, 1947 – May 24, 1975) was an American spree killer who killed two people and wounded nine others in Dayton, Ohio, United States on May 24, 1975. He also took two women hostage and raped them before committing suicide.

== Life ==
Smith was born in Bessemer, Alabama, on February 6, 1947. His father was killed in an ore mine accident in 1951, and his mother died less than a year later, leaving him orphaned at the age of 4. His only sister died of a heart attack at the age of 19.

When he was 17 years old Smith began to live with his aunt Evelyn Harris in Dayton and in 1968 he married, but his wife Laura later left him and as a result he became despondent and stopped caring for anything.

He was arrested repeatedly for drunkenness, armed robbery, auto theft, and attempted breaking and entering, and in 1970 was sentenced to one to ten years at the Mansfield Reformatory after pleading guilty to first degree manslaughter for the killing of a man during a shootout at a Dayton bar.

During his time in prison two psychiatrists who had examined him found that he had numerous traits of a sociopathic nature, that he would react violently during extremely stressful situations, and that this would undoubtedly cause trouble in his future. Despite this negative assessment he was placed on probation in July 1971 after 10 months in prison, but continued to receive psychiatric treatment afterwards.

According to Evelyn Harris, Smith was an easy-going and soft-spoken person, but was irascible when somebody pushed him. Two weeks prior to the murders he talked with her about the fact that all members of his family had died early, and made her the beneficiary on his life insurance policy, because "nobody knew what's going to happen."

== Shooting ==
Around midnight on May 24, 1975, Smith and his girlfriend Joan Gatewood drove to a local motorcycle club where he wanted to confront Joseph Picket, whom he suspected of dating Gatewood. When he called Picket outside an argument ensued between the two during which Smith drew a .38-caliber pistol and shot his rival in the chest, or neck.

He also wounded Ocie Lee Curry with a shot in the arm when he came outside to see what was going on and then went back to his car in which Gatewood had waited. Apparently because she began to quarrel with him Smith killed Gatewood with a shot in the head and afterwards drove towards St. Elizabeth's Medical Center, shooting and seriously injuring on his way James Bailey in front of a YMCA building.

Arriving at the hospital's emergency ramp Smith pushed Gatewood's body out of the car and then drove on the highway towards the suburbs. When he passed the car of George Christopherson he forced him off the road and wounded him by firing twice through the windshield.

A few blocks further he chanced upon the Baltozer family who was just entering their car in the parking lot of a movie theater. Smith approached them and fired several rounds into the vehicle, injuring Charles and Carole Baltozer, as well as their son Charles Jr. by shooting each of them twice, and seriously wounding their daughter Heather with a shot in the stomach.

Subsequently Smith returned to his car, drove around the suburbs, and stopping at a diner took Paulette Couch hostage. A while later he approached the car of 22-year-old Tom Edwards who was about to let out his girlfriend Lisa Hardin at her home. Holding Edwards at bay with his gun Smith forced Hardin into his own vehicle and then killed Couch by shooting her in the head when she tried to escape.

Next he knocked at a house and asked the girl who opened the door, if he could use a bed of theirs, but when she answered no he kidnapped her, too, and drove to a wooded area. There he wrecked his car during a struggle with the two girls, after which he ordered them into a ravine and raped both of them.

Heading back to the road Smith and his hostages went to another house to ask for directions. At the sight of the gun in his hand the woman, who had answered his call, slammed the door shut, whereupon Smith fired two shots into the dwelling. During his next stop he wounded Ann Wencelwicz at her home with a shot in the neck after she told him that she didn't have a car.

At 2:22 a.m. Smith flagged down the car of 24-year-old Frank Smith and his passenger Anthony Brown. As Russell Smith was about to shoot the driver police closed in on him, causing him to commit suicide by shooting himself in the head.

== Victims ==
- Joan Marie Gatewood, 16, Smith's girlfriend.
- Paulette A. Couch, 25.

Those wounded were:

- James Bailey, 27.
- Charles Baltozer, 38.
- Carole Baltozer, 38.
- Charles Baltozer Jr., 17.
- Heather Ann Baltozer, 6, shot in the stomach.
- George Christopherson, 28.
- Ocie Lee Curry, 27, shot in the arm.
- Joseph Picket, 29, shot in the chest, or neck.
- Ann Wencelwicz, 19, shot in the left hip.
- Lisa Hardin, 19, raped.
- Unidentified woman, 18, raped.

== See also ==
- List of rampage killers in the United States
