= Earl K. Long Medical Center =

Defunct acute-care hospital

Coordinates: 30°30′14.7″N 91°7′52.8″W

The Earl K. Long Medical Center, named after the Louisiana politician Earl K. Long, was an acute-care hospital located in Baton Rouge, Louisiana. The hospital was a member of the Louisiana State University Medical Center (LSUMC). Earl K. Long Medical Center was responsible for providing care to several state parishes. Earl K. Long was a public facility, and was run by the state of Louisiana. Various outpatient and inpatient services are no longer provided at this facility.

The cornerstone of the building was laid October 2, 1967 and the hospital opened on March 5, 1968. Demolition of the building began on June 12, 2015.
