= 1977 New Rochelle shooting =

Fatal workplace mass shooting

- Location: 40°53′56.8″N 73°47′32.9″W; New Rochelle, New York, United States
- Date: February 14, 1977; 7:45 a.m. – 2:40 p.m. (EST)
- Target: People at the Neptune Worldwide Moving Company, mainly supervisor Norman Bing
- Attack type: Mass shooting, workplace violence, siege
- Weapons: .308 SACO HK-41 semi-automatic rifle; Four semi-automatic handguns: Two .45-caliber Colt M1911s; 9mm Browning Hi-Power; 9mm Walther P38
- Deaths: 7 (including the perpetrator and a victim who died weeks later)
- Injuries: 4
- Victims: Joseph Hicks, Frederick Holmes, James Green, Pariyarathu Varghese, Joseph Russo and Allen McLeod
- Perpetrator: Frederick Cowan
- Motive: Nazism and revenge

On February 14, 1977, a suspended worker of the Neptune Worldwide Moving Company entered the office and warehouse complex and opened fire, killing six people and injuring four others before killing himself in a 10-hour long siege. Five people were pronounced dead at the scene, while an injured victim died six weeks after the shooting.

== Background ==
The Neptune Worldwide Moving Company was created in 1898 and grew rapidly.

== Shooting ==
Cowan dressed up in an army jacket, a khaki shirt and khaki slacks. He arrived at 7:45 a.m. and took several fully loaded weapons and ammunition out of the trunk of his red 1971 Pontiac GTO Coupe. He then walked in looking for his supervisor Norman Bing who previously had him suspended from work. Cowan than fatally shot the first three people he encountered. He then moved to the second floor and killed another person. The first officer arrived at the scene within ten minutes of the first shot being fired but was killed by Cowan upon arrival. Cowan also shot and wounded three other officers that arrived and two civilians on the street out of a second-floor window.

By noon, Cowan was surrounded by 300 officers and two police helicopters. He reportedly called the New Rochelle Police headquarters at 12:30 and asked for a potato salad and cocoa. He also apologized for the shooting. He shot himself approximately two hours later at 2:23 p.m. with one of the pistols. Police, unsure whether he had any hostages, waited until dusk to enter the building and later at night to remove the shooters body due to the possibility of him having hand grenades after he reportedly told the police on another phone call that he had plenty grenades and enough guns and ammunition to last him a whole day. The police later confirmed he had no hostages or hand grenades. They found multiple employees still hiding from the gunman by night time.

== Perpetrator ==
The perpetrator was identified as 33-year-old Frederick William Cowan. He fired over 100 shots during the shooting. Cowan was suspended from work after he was allegedly being rude to customers and had carried out the shooting in revenge for his suspension targeting his Jewish supervisor Norman Bing who had him suspended from work. Cowan was a United States Army veteran and World Body-Building League member. Cowan hated black and Jewish people, and admired Nazis. He collected Nazi paraphernalia at home, saying he was the second Adolf Hitler. Cowan had tattoos of swastikas and iron crosses. He also collected firearms and grenades.

== Aftermath ==
Four decades after the shooting in February 2018, the city of New Rochelle proposed to name a street "Police Officer Allen B. McLeod Way" in honour of officer Allen B. McLeod who was killed in the shooting. The street was named in May.

== Reactions ==
About 3,500 policemen representing at least 62 police departments gathered at the church officer Allen B. McLeod's funeral was at, officials estimated, to pay their last respects.
