= Freddy's Fashion Mart massacre =

1995 criminal attack in New York City

- Location: 40.80969°N 73.9508°W; 272 West 125th Street; Harlem, Manhattan, New York City, New York, United States
- Date: December 8, 1995; 10:12 a.m. – 12:07 p.m. (Eastern Standard Time)
- Target: Freddy's Fashion Mart
- Attack type: Mass shooting, hostage taking, arson, murder–suicide
- Weapons: .38-caliber revolver; Ignitable liquid
- Deaths: 8 (including the perpetrator)
- Injuries: 4
- Perpetrator: Roland James Smith Jr.
- Motive: Anti-white racism

On December 8, 1995, eight people, including the assailant, were killed when a gunman seized hostages at Freddy's (Note: Sources disagree on whether this name was spelled Freddy's or Freddie's.) Fashion Mart in the Harlem neighborhood of Manhattan, New York City, and set the building on fire. The attack followed protests relating to the planned eviction of a black-owned business by a white proprietor.

== Background ==
In 1995 the black Pentecostal Church United House of Prayer owned a retail property on 125th Street across from the Apollo Theater and asked Fred Harari—a Jewish tenant who operated Freddie's Fashion Mart—not to renew the lease of his longtime subtenant, a record store called The Record Shack owned by South African Sikhulu Shange. Harari, who was a tenant himself of the church, subleased the space to the Record Shack. African-American activist Al Sharpton led protests outside the Harlem store that began in September against both the planned eviction of the Record Shack, and because Freddie's did not employ enough black workers. Sharpton told the crowd of protesters: "We will not stand by and allow them to move this brother so that some white interloper can expand his business." Antisemitic fliers were distributed by protestors and police opened a racial bias investigation after a security guard told them one of them had said "We’re going to come back with 20 niggas and loot and burn the Jew." Another protestor was accused in court papers of making threatening gestures toward the store and its customers and employees during the months of protests that preceded the massacre and was alleged to have burst into the establishment shouting "I will be back to burn the Jew store down. Burn, burn, burn."

Although then-mayor Rudy Giuliani said the United House of Prayer was the driving force behind the planned eviction of the Record Shack, the perception was that of a white landlord trying to evict a black shop owner.

=== Perpetrator ===
Roland J. Smith Jr. was born in 1944. His mother died when he was three. He was arrested in 1962 on charges of stealing a car. Four years later, he was charged with weapons possession. In 1967, he renounced his citizenship and refused to fight in the Vietnam War, despite being drafted. For this, he was sentenced to four years in federal prison. In 1989, he was convicted of resisting arrest and assaulting a police officer in Tampa, Florida. A year later, he returned to Harlem, which was against his probation. In 1994, he was charged with aggravated harassment and resisting arrest for allegedly participating in a street vendor related brawl on 125th Street. On November 28, 1995, the six-story Bronx apartment building that he lived in burned to the ground.

In the days leading up to the attack, Smith had participated in a number of protests outside Freddie's Fashion Mart. Customers and surviving employees recalled Smith as being more aggressive than most other protestors, shouting slurs at them and calling black customers "Uncle Toms going to shop in the white man's store".

== Attack ==
On December 8, 1995, Smith entered Freddie's at around 10:12 a.m. EST with a .38-caliber revolver and a container of flammable liquid. He ordered black customers to leave, then set the store on fire by splashing around the accelerant, positioning himself near the only exit. Smith shot four employees and shot at two police officers arriving at the scene. At 12:07 p.m., firefighters had contained the blaze and entered the burned-out building to discover seven store employees had died of smoke inhalation, and the gunman had fatally shot himself. Four of the victims were found in the basement and three were found on the main floor huddled together, beside them the body of the gunman still clutching his revolver with 16 rounds of ammunition in his pockets. Fire Department officials discovered that the sprinklers in the basement were shut off. The only fire exit, located in the basement, had been sealed by a bricks due to frequent burglaries so the only exit for those trapped meant passing the gunman or through a small hole that thieves had smashed through the basement's brick wall. At least two employees managed to escape through this hole which was six feet above the floor and 18 inches in diameter.

== Victims ==
The seven fatal victims consisted of one black security guard, five Hispanic women, and one Guyanese Indian male. All the victims were store employees.

- Kareem Brunner (23)
- Olga Garcia (19)
- Angeline Marrero (19)
- Cynthia Martinez (19)
- Garnette Ramautar (43)
- Luz Ramos (20)
- Mayra Rentas (22)

Two white construction workers (Patrick Glynn and Fionan O'Shea), the store's Jewish manager (Alan Grossberg) and a Guyanese Indian guard (Isardeen Chaitram) were shot and wounded by Smith but survived. Glynn was shot in the back, losing his spleen and suffering kidney and intestinal damage damage while O'Shea—whose head was aimed squarely at by Smith—was grazed in the head and escaped as Smith was reloading. Grossberg was shot in the chest while Chaitram was shot in the stomach.

== Aftermath ==
Sharpton subsequently said the perpetrator was an open critic of him and his nonviolent tactics. In 2002, Sharpton expressed regret for making the racial remark "white interloper" but denied responsibility for inflaming or provoking the violence.
