= Colorado Springs shooting =

Colorado Springs shooting may refer to any of these shootings which occurred in the city of Colorado Springs, in the US state of Colorado:

- 2007 Colorado YWAM and New Life shootings, a pair of related shootings in December 2007, one of which occurred in Colorado Springs
- Colorado Springs Planned Parenthood shooting, the second of two shootings to occur in 2015, during November
- 2021 Colorado Springs shooting, a shooting in May 2021
- Colorado Springs nightclub shooting, a shooting in November 2022

== See also ==
- List of shootings in Colorado
