= List of shootings in Colorado =

Coordinates: 38.9972°N 105.5478°W

The location of the State of Colorado in the United States of America.

This is a List of notable shootings in the U.S. State of Colorado.

== List ==
Since the 1990s, three Colorado massacres in the Denver metropolitan area have garnered national attention: the Columbine High School massacre in 1999, which resulted in 15 deaths (including the post-massacre suicides by the two perpetrators); the Aurora shooting in 2012, which resulted in 12 deaths; and the 2021 Boulder shooting, which resulted in 10 deaths.

Events	Location	Date	Number of persons killed	Description
Ludlow Massacre	Ludlow	April 20, 1914	c. 21	The deadliest incident of the Colorado Coalfield War, a major coal miner strike. The Colorado National Guard as well as private guards employed by the Colorado Fuel and Iron Company fired on a tent colony of 1,200 strikers and their families.
Hibbard family murders	Colorado Springs	September 25, 1978	4 (including the perpetrator	Glada Fern Hibbard shoots and kills her husband and two children, in their Colorado Springs neighborhood, before committing suicide.
1993 Aurora, Colorado shooting	Aurora	December 14, 1993	4	Nathan Dunlap, 19, who was fired from a Chuck E. Cheese's restaurant as a cook, later returned to the restaurant and opened fire, killing four employees and wounding another. He was convicted of first-degree murder and attempted murder charges and was sentenced to death. In 2013, then-Colorado Governor John Hickenlooper indefinitely delayed Dunlap’s execution. Hickenlooper was expected to order a clemency in his death penalty before his term ended in early 2019 but took no such action. He was succeeded by Governor Jared Polis, who commuted Dunlap's sentence to life imprisonment. Polis said he conferred with the families of Dunlap's victims and felt the crimes were "despicable," but took the action as being consistent with Colorado's prior repeal of the death penalty in cases of new crimes.
Columbine High School massacre	Columbine	April 20, 1999	16 (including both perpetrators and a victim in 2025)	Two senior students, Eric Harris and Dylan Klebold, embarked on a shooting spree in which a total of 13 students and one teacher were murdered. They also injured 20 other students directly, with three further people being injured while attempting to escape the school. The pair then committed suicide. It is the sixth-deadliest school massacre in United States history, after the 1927 Bath School disaster, the 2007 Virginia Tech shooting, the 2012 Sandy Hook Elementary School shooting and the 2022 Robb Elementary School Shooting, and remained the deadliest for an American high school until the Stoneman Douglas High School shooting of 2018.
Subway Valentine's Day shooting	Littleton	February 14, 2000	2	Stephanie Hart-Grizzell and Nicholas Kunselman were shot in a Subway restaurant. The case remains unsolved.
AMF Broadway Bowling Alley shooting	Littleton	January 27, 2002	3	Bobby Zajac, Erin Golla and James Springer were shot at the AMF Broadway Bowling Alley. The case remains unsolved.
2005 Denver police officer shooting	Denver	May 7–8, 2005	1	Two Denver police officers were shot at a dance hall by Raúl Gómez-García.
Platte Canyon High School hostage crisis	Bailey	September 27, 2006	2	Duane Roger Morrison took a high school classroom hostage and killed hostage Emily Keyes as she tried to escape. Morrison died after shooting himself and being shot by police.
2007 Colorado YWAM and New Life shootings	Arvada/Colorado Springs	December 9, 2007	5	Matthew Murray opened fire at two church organizations in separate cities, killing four and wounding five others before committing suicide.
2010 Deer Creek Middle School shootings	Littleton	February 23, 2010	0	Bruco Eastwood fired a rifle in the school’s parking lot, wounding two students. He was tackled by faculty and arrested. Eastwood was found legally insane and committed to the state mental hospital.
2012 Aurora theater shooting	Aurora	July 20, 2012	12	James Holmes opened fire during a midnight showing of "The Dark Knight Rises". Twelve people in the theater were killed and 70 were injured.
2013 Arapahoe High School shooting	Centennial	December 13, 2013	2	Eighteen-year-old student Karl Pierson entered Arapahoe High School carrying Molotov cocktails and a shotgun. He shot another student and then killed himself.
October 2015 Colorado Springs shooting	Colorado Springs	October 31, 2015	4 (including the perpetrator)	Noah Harpham randomly killed three before being killed by responding police officers. Harpham had been open carrying; some opponents asserted this allowed a delay such that he was able to kill more people than if police intervention would have been warranted by his presence with a rifle.
November 2015 Colorado Springs shooting	Colorado Springs	November 27, 2015	3	A shooting and five-hour police standoff occurred at a Planned Parenthood clinic in Colorado Springs. A University of Colorado Colorado Springs police officer and two civilians (a mother of two and an Iraqi war vet) were killed. Five police officers and four civilians were wounded. The killer, Robert Lewis Dear, was captured after police convinced him to surrender. During his arrest, he gave a "rambling" interview during which he said "No more baby parts."
Thornton shooting	Thornton	November 1, 2017	3	Scott Ostrem walked into a Walmart, killed three people near the cash registers, then fled the scene. Ostrem had been arrested 14 times before the killings.
2019 STEM School Highlands Ranch shooting	Highlands Ranch	May 7, 2019	1	At STEM school in Highlands Ranch, nine were shot including one dead. In 2019, 18-year-old Devon Erickson and 16-year-old Alec McKinney stood trial for the shootings. In 2020, McKinney was charged with felony murder, murder with extreme indifference, attempted murder, and other charges. In 2021, Erickson was charged with first-degree murder, murder with extreme indifference, attempted murder, supplying a juvenile with a handgun, and other charges.
Aurora Town Center shooting	Aurora, Colorado	December 27, 2019	1	A 17-year-old boy was shot and killed inside a JCPenney in the Aurora Town Center mall. Kamyl Xavier Garrette, 18, was charged with first-degree murder.
2021 Boulder shooting	Boulder, Colorado	March 22, 2021	10	Ahmad Al Aliwi Al-Issa opened fire in a King Soopers supermarket and killed ten people, including police officer Eric Talley who ran towards gunfire in an attempt to stop the shooter.
2021 Colorado Springs shooting	Colorado Springs, Colorado	May 9, 2021	7 (including the suspect)	Six adults were killed at a birthday party after which the shooter, Teodoro Macias, took his own life. The shooting was an act of domestic violence against his ex-girlfriend.
2021 Aurora shooting	Aurora, Colorado	November 15, 2021	0	Shots were fired near William C. Hinkley High School, resulting in injury to seven. Four teens were charged with attempted murder.
2021 Denver and Lakewood shootings	Denver and Lakewood	December 27, 2021	6 (including the suspect)	Lyndon McLeod (aka Roman McClay) killed five and injured two at multiple Denver and Lakewood locations. McLeod later exchanged gunfire with a Lakewood police officer and was killed.
Colorado Springs nightclub shooting	Colorado Springs, Colorado	November 19, 2022	5	At Club Q, an LGBTQ+ club, five were killed and 25 wounded.
American elm restaurant shooting	Denver	April 24, 2023	2	Emerall Vaughn-Dahler and Ignacio Gutierrez Morales were shot and killed inside the American Elm restaurant at 38th Avenue and Raleigh Street in the West Highlands. The case remains unsolved.
Evergreen High School	Evergreen, Colorado	September 10, 2025		

== See also ==
- Ludlow massacre
- List of shootings in Alabama
- List of shootings in California
- List of shootings in Florida
- List of shootings in New York (state)
- List of shootings in Texas
- Bibliography of Colorado
- Geography of Colorado
- History of Colorado
- Index of Colorado-related articles
- List of Colorado-related lists
- Outline of Colorado
