= City Market (US grocery store chain) =

American supermarket brand

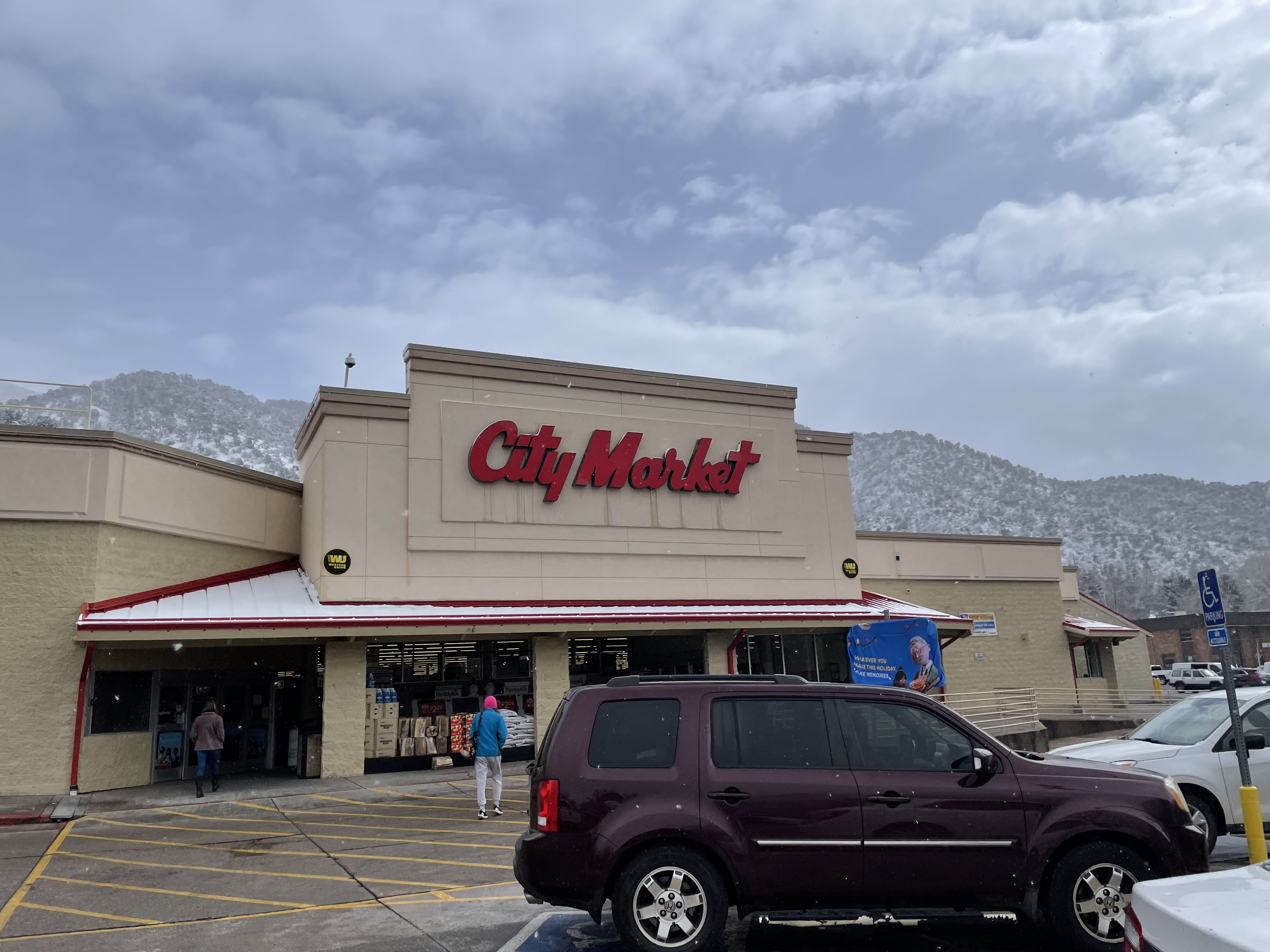
- City Market store in Glenwood Springs, Colorado
- Type: Subsidiary
- Industry: Retail
- Founded: 1924; 102 years ago, in Grand Junction, Colorado
- Products: Bakery, dairy, deli, frozen foods, general grocery, meat, pharmacy, produce, seafood, snacks, liquor
- Parent: Dillons (1969–1983); King Soopers (1983–present)
- Website: www.kingsoopers.com www.citymarket.com

City Market is a supermarket chain operating in the Rocky Mountains of the United States. City Market, Inc. has its headquarters in Grand Junction, Colorado. It is a subsidiary of Kroger.

== History ==
City Market traces its origins to Josef Pruenster, an Austrian immigrant who arrived in the United States in 1873. After initially living and working in Cincinnati, Pruenster settled in La Junta, Colorado, where he established a slaughterhouse before expanding into a meat shop and grocery store under the name City Market. His children participated in the family business, including four sons who would later establish the supermarket chain.

In 1924, Paul Prinster, the eldest of the four brothers, moved to Grand Junction, Colorado, where he worked in a Piggly Wiggly grocery store before purchasing an interest in a separate grocery on Fourth Street also called City Market. His brothers Frank, Leo, and Clarence subsequently joined him, and together they acquired full ownership of the store.

The Prinster brothers expanded their operations in 1939 with the opening of a modern supermarket near Fourth Street and Rood Avenue in Grand Junction. Following the Second World War, City Market entered a period of regional growth, establishing stores in Montrose, Delta, and other towns in western Colorado, as well as in New Mexico, Utah, and Wyoming.

In 1969, the company was acquired by the Dillon Companies, making it a sister company to Front Range-based King Soopers. City Market and King Soopers became part of The Kroger Co. when Dillon and Kroger merged in 1999.

=== Merger ===
In 2024, a federal judge blocked a merger between Kroger and Albertsons. During the trial, executives from parent company Kroger acknowledged that eight City Markets in Colorado had raised prices with little to no competition with 'little impact to business'.

== Stores ==
It formerly operated a location in New Mexico (located in Shiprock, on the Navajo Reservation), which was sold to Arizona-based Bashas in 2022.

As of 2025, Kroger operated 32 City Market stores across 27 cities in Colorado.
