= Walmart shooting =

Walmart shooting may refer to:

- 2014 Las Vegas shootings, at and near a Walmart Supercenter in Las Vegas, Nevada
- 2014 killing of John Crawford III, at a Walmart Supercenter in Beavercreek, Ohio
- 2017 Thornton shooting, at a Walmart Supercenter in Thornton, Colorado
- 2019 Southaven shooting, at a Walmart Supercenter in Southaven, Mississippi
- 2019 El Paso shooting, at a Walmart Supercenter in El Paso, Texas
- 2022 Chesapeake shooting, at a Walmart Supercenter in Chesapeake, Virginia
- 2023 Beavercreek shooting, at a Walmart Supercenter in Beavercreek, Ohio

== See also ==
- 2025 Traverse City stabbing attack, at a Walmart Supercenter in Traverse City, Michigan
- Criticism of Walmart
