= 2021 Atlanta spa shootings =

Spree shooting in Georgia, U.S.

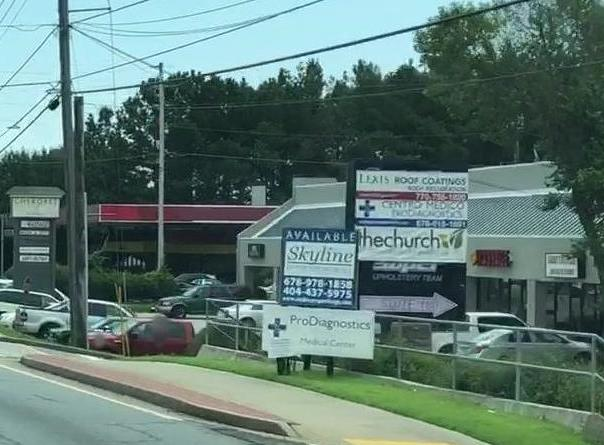
- Young's Asian Massage parlor (second from right), where the first shooting took place (pictured 2018)
- Location: 34.0882°N 84.5811°W (first shooting, unincorporated Cherokee County); 33.8096°N 84.3662°W (second shooting, in Atlanta); 33.8102°N 84.3658°W (third shooting, in Atlanta); 31.8547°N 83.7189°W (perpetrator captured, in unincorporated Crisp County); Atlanta and unincorporated Cherokee County, Georgia, U.S.
- Date: March 16, 2021 c. 4:50 p.m. EDT (20:50 UTC)
- Target: Spas and massage parlors
- Attack type: Mass shooting; femicide; mass murder; shooting spree; domestic terrorism
- Weapon: 9×19mm Parabellum Sarsilmaz semi-automatic pistol
- Deaths: 8
- Injuries: 1
- Perpetrator: Robert Aaron Long
- Motive: Disputed: Conflict between the perpetrator's sex addiction and his religious beliefs (stated by perpetrator); Anti-Asian racism (claim by prosecution in Fulton County)
- Charges: Domestic terrorism, malice murder (x4), felony murder (x4), aggravated assault (x4), and 6 other related charges (Fulton County)
- Verdict: Pleaded guilty in Cherokee County murders Fulton County trial pending
- Convictions: Malice murder (x4), felony murder (x4), aggravated assault (x4), and 11 other convictions (Cherokee County)
- Sentence: Four consecutive life sentences without the possibility of parole plus 35 years (Cherokee County)

On March 16, 2021, a shooting spree occurred at two spas and a massage parlor in the metropolitan area of Atlanta, Georgia, United States. Eight people were killed and a ninth was wounded. The shooter, 21-year-old Robert Aaron Long, was taken into custody later that day.

Long told police he was motivated by a sexual addiction that was at odds with his Christianity, for which he had spent time in an evangelical treatment clinic, and that he had been targeting establishments where he had previously paid for sex. While six of the eight people killed were women of Asian descent, Long denied that race had played any role in the killings, which was questioned by numerous organizations such as the CAPAC, CAA and NAPAWF, U.S. politicians Marilyn Strickland and Bee Nguyen, as well as by the South Korean media and the victims' families.

Long was charged with 19 crimes in Fulton County and 23 crimes in Cherokee County. He pleaded guilty to the Cherokee County charges and was sentenced to life in prison without the possibility of parole. The shooting was one of the main incidents that gave rise to the Stop Asian Hate movement, against the backdrop of rising anti-Asian sentiment in the country. While the Cherokee County District Attorney stated that they found no evidence of racism as a motive for the murders, Fulton County prosecutors have stated that both race and gender played a part and are seeking the death penalty for Long.

It was the worst mass shooting in Georgia since the Atlanta day trading firm shootings.

== Events ==
=== Before the shootings ===
On the morning of the day of the shooting, Long's roommate overheard Long watching pornography. Long said in court that he felt ashamed and went to purchase a firearm in order to commit suicide.

=== Shootings ===
==== Cherokee County shooting ====
Around 2 p.m., Long legally purchased a 9mm handgun and a box of 50 bullets at a firearms store in Holly Springs. He also purchased a bottle of bourbon at a liquor store, which he drank while driving to Young's Asian Massage ("Young's"), a massage parlor near Acworth. Surveillance footage showed him arriving at Young's and sitting for an hour in the parking lot. While in the parking lot, he loaded the gun. He then entered the building around 3:38 p.m. EDT (19:38 UTC) and remained inside for a period of one hour and 12 minutes. When he was inside the building, Long paid for a service. The service ended around 4:45 p.m. and Long went to the restroom in the back of the building. Another customer who went to Young's that day said in an interview that everything was still normal inside when that customer arrived around 4:40 p.m.

When Long finished using the bathroom, he walked out, pulled out his 9mm handgun, and aimed it at Paul Andre Michels. Michels was in the back of the building using his cellphone while leaning over a counter. Long fatally shot him once in the head. Long began walking towards the front of the business in the main hallway. His next victim, Daoyou Feng, was in room 3. Feng poked her head out of the room and Long shot her once in the head. Long entered room 4 and shot Xiaojie Tan once in the head. Long then walked into room 2 and injured a man. Long entered room 6 and fatally shot customer Delaina Ashley Yaun González once in the torso while she was hiding in the corner of the room. Her husband was receiving a service in another room. Only six people in the building were left uninjured.

Long left Young's at 4:50 p.m. Shots were fired at some point after. A customer who survived a gunshot wound said the gunman walked into Young's and began firing. The customer threw himself to the floor and begged the gunman not to shoot him. The gunman demanded him to look up at him, and when the customer complied, he was shot in the face.

The first 9-1-1 calls reporting the shooting to the Cherokee County Sheriff's Office were made at 4:54 p.m. Police arrived at Young's within minutes of Long's departure. They found two people fatally shot and three others wounded in different rooms down a hallway; two of the wounded later died at a hospital. Police found a male customer, whose wife and fellow customer were fatally shot, sitting on a bed in another room, scared and confused, and detained him for four hours.

==== Piedmont Road shootings ====
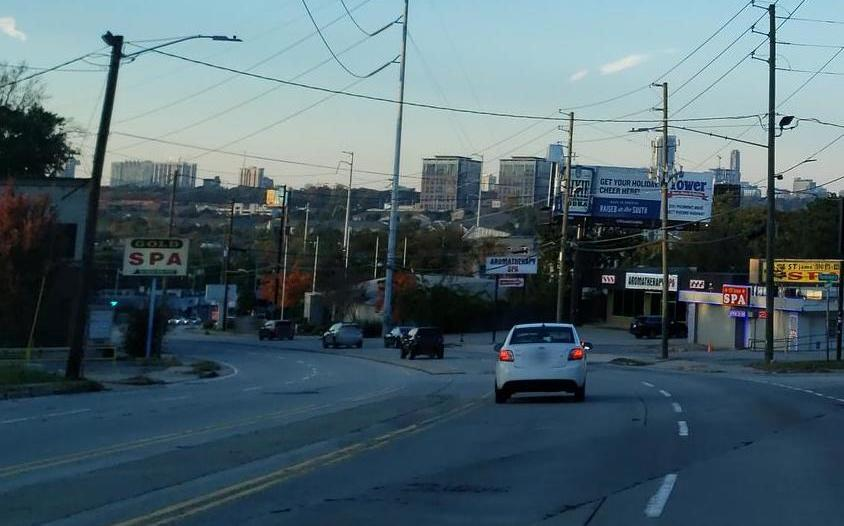
Gold Spa (left) and Aromatherapy Spa (second from right) pictured in 2018

At 5:47 p.m. EDT, the Atlanta Police Department ("APD") responded to reports of a robbery at Gold Massage Spa ("Gold Spa") on Piedmont Road in northeast Atlanta, about 30 miles (48 km) from the first shooting scene. There, they found three women dead from gunshot wounds. While Atlanta police were at Gold Spa, they received reports of another shooting across the street at Aromatherapy Spa, where they discovered another woman shot and killed. Three of the four victims had been shot in the head.

Two Gold Spa employees who survived the shooting reported hearing ticking sounds while in a break room, which turned out to be gunfire. They hid in a lounge and took cover under items stored there, and were shot at but not injured. According to them, the gunman did not speak or make any other sounds during the shooting, and he locked both the front and back doors of the spa at some point. According to a report from South Korean newspaper The Chosun Ilbo, a nearby Korean restaurant told how an unidentified Gold Spa employee who escaped from the store during the shooting stated that the shooter said, "I'm going to kill all Asians", although in a later Rolling Stone interview, a taxi driver who had talked to a local business manager stated it was a police officer who had told the manager this. According to an eyewitness, the attacker shot the worker who opened the door of Aromatherapy Spa for him and fled without entering. The prosecutor believed the suspect's gun malfunctioned after shooting the employee at Aromatherapy Spa.

According to the APD, they noticed the similarities between the Piedmont Road and Cherokee County shootings and subsequently dispatched officers to patrol similar businesses in the area. The Federal Bureau of Investigation assisted in the investigation.

=== Arrest ===
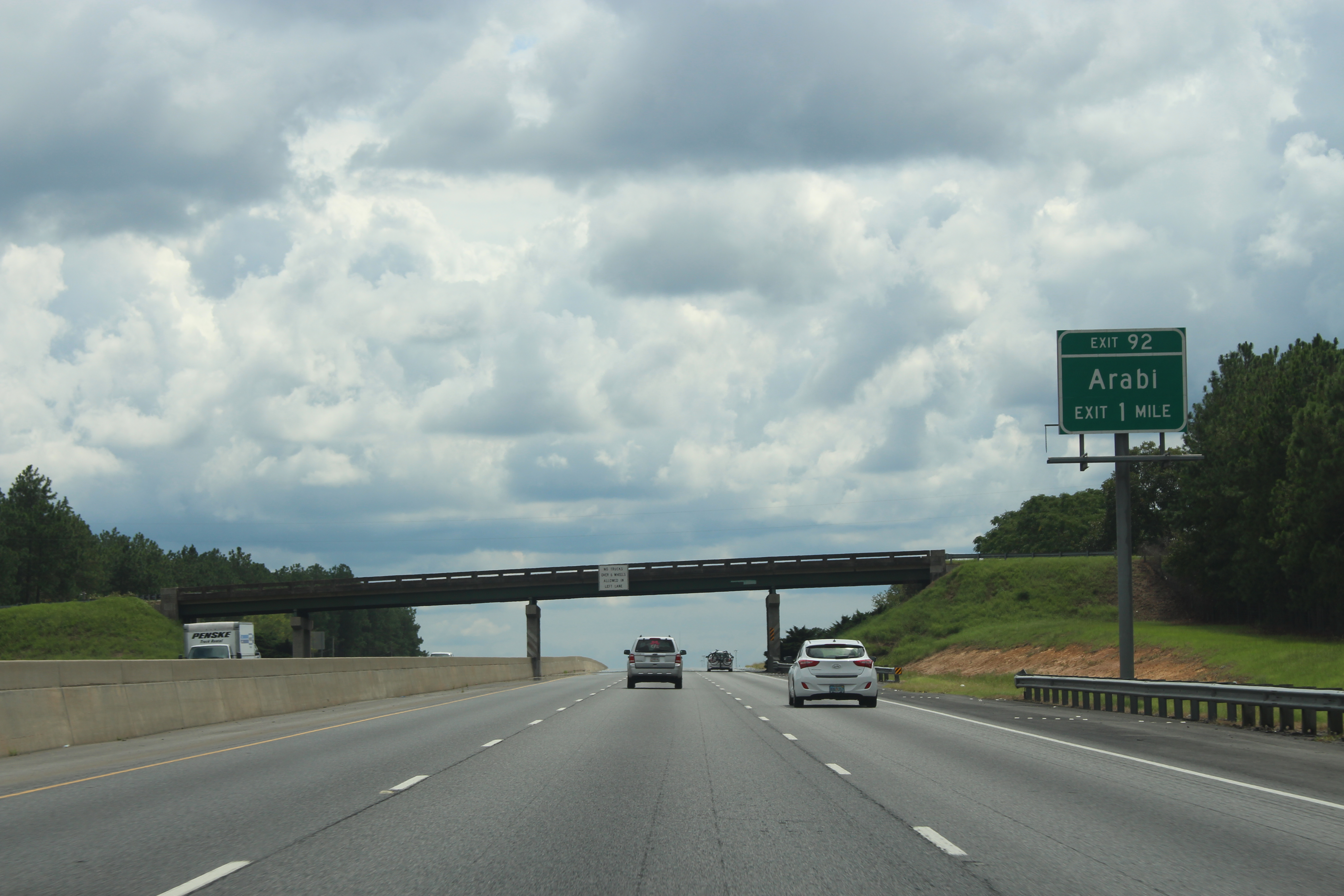
Long was arrested near this point on Interstate 75, just south of Cordele

After the first shooting, Cherokee County police released surveillance footage to the public and were contacted by Long's parents, who recognized him. While they were being interviewed, the APD was responding to the second and third shootings in Atlanta. His parents informed deputies that Long's Hyundai Tucson was equipped with a tracking device. Using surveillance footage of his vehicle at both crime scenes along with the car's tracker, police were able to ascertain his location.

Around 8:30 p.m., roughly 3.5 hours after the shootings, Long was spotted by police in Crisp County, about 150 miles (240 km) south of Atlanta. Georgia State Patrol officers followed him south on Interstate 75 to a location just south of Cordele, where they used a PIT maneuver to stop his vehicle and took him into custody. Long was on his way to Florida when he was apprehended.

Long was initially arrested in connection to the Cherokee County shooting; police later identified him as a suspect in the Piedmont Road shootings as well. Police found a 9mm handgun in his car.

== Victims ==
The shooter killed seven women and one man. One man was wounded. Six died at the scene, one en route to a hospital, and one in treatment. Six victims, four at Piedmont Road and two at Cherokee County, were women of Asian descent. The others were a white woman and a white man, and the survivor is a Hispanic man from Guatemala. The South Korean Foreign Affairs Ministry reported that four of the dead were of Korean ethnicity, and one was a South Korean citizen.

Police released the names of the eight deceased victims on March 19. The victims at Young's Asian Massage were Delaina Ashley Yaun González, 33; Xiaojie Tan (Chinese: 谭晓洁; pinyin: Tán Xiǎojié), 49; Daoyou Feng (Chinese: 冯道有; pinyin: Féng Dàoyǒu), 44; and Paul Andre Michels, 54. The victims at the Gold Spa were Hyun Jung Grant (née Kim; Korean: 김현정; Hanja: 金賢廷), 51; Suncha Kim (김선자; 金宣子), 69; and Soon Chung Park (박순청; 朴純請), 74. The victim at Aromatherapy Spa was Yong Ae Yue (유영애; 柳英愛), 63.

== Perpetrator ==
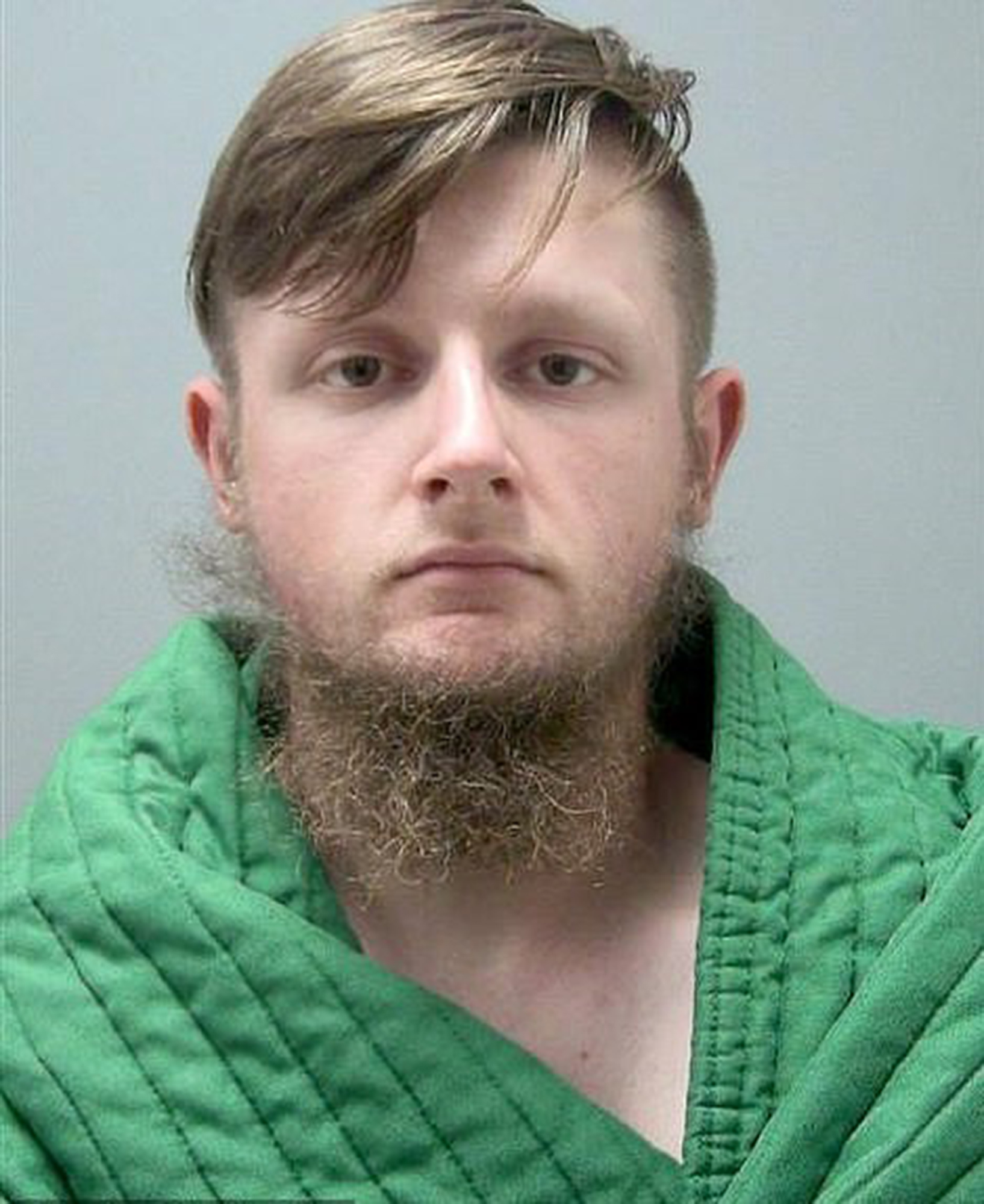
Mugshot of Long after his arrest

The suspect was identified as 21-year-old Robert Aaron Long, of Woodstock, Georgia. He was born in Woodstock on April 6, 1999, and raised in a conservative community. He graduated from Sequoyah High School in spring 2017. From fall 2017 to fall 2018, Long was enrolled at the Cumming campus of the University of North Georgia, but he did not earn a degree. Long was a hunter and heavily involved in his Southern Baptist congregation. Cherokee County Sheriff Frank Reynolds said Long did not have any prior interactions with law enforcement.

Long spent time in HopeQuest, an evangelical treatment facility located near Acworth and down the road from the first spa that he attacked. He was a patient at the treatment center for what he described as "sex addiction". He claimed to be "tortured" by his addiction to sex since he was "deeply religious", according to his halfway house roommate. His roommate also said that, several times during his stay at the halfway house, Long said that he had "relapsed" and gone to massage parlors to visit sex workers. Long's parents had kicked him out of their house the night before the shooting due to concerns about his sex addiction, and said he watched internet pornography several hours each day. A report to police said that Long was "emotional" after being evicted from his parents' house.

=== Motive ===
According to the police, Long described his actions as the result of a sex addiction that conflicted with his religious beliefs. Long had been a customer at two of the massage parlors, and saw them as sources of sexual temptation. Police records show that two of the massage parlors had been the site of 10 prostitution arrests, the latest of which took place in 2013. All three targeted spas appeared on an online guide to brothels. Long claims to have initially thought about killing himself but instead decided to target the businesses to "help" others dealing with sex addiction. According to the Cherokee County Sheriff's Department, Long wanted to "eliminate the temptation" by targeting spas.

He had been an active member of Crabapple First Baptist Church in Milton, Georgia. The church took down its Facebook site, which included photos that included Long, after the shooting.

Ruth Graham, a national religion correspondent for The New York Times, wrote that Long "seemed to have a fixation on sexual temptation, one that can lead to despair among people who believe they are failing to follow the ideal of refraining from sex and even lust outside heterosexual marriage." According to Samuel Perry, a professor of sociology and author of three books on the modern evangelical church, the church's confusing sex rhetoric can lead to desperation over perceived sex addiction and a belief that one must take extreme measures to stop it.

The American Psychological Association does not have sex addiction as a diagnosis in the DSM-5. The World Health Organization includes "excessive sexual drive" as a diagnosis (code F52.7) in the latest version of the International Classification of Diseases (ICD-10), but as a compulsive behavior or impulse control disorder rather than an addiction. Psychologist David J. Ley and neuroscientist Nicole Prause noted significant differences between sex addiction and other types of addiction. Psychotherapist Robert Weiss, who diagnoses people with sexual addiction, expressed doubt in the diagnosis for Long because sex addicts are typically nonviolent.

Some noted the ethnicity of six of the victims, who were Asian women, amidst an increase in anti-Asian hate crimes in the United States during the COVID-19 pandemic, or characterized the shooting as a hate crime. While some experts have claimed that race cannot be ruled out as a motive because of the fetishization of Asian women in the U.S., others have pointed out that the perpetrator was instead targeting sex workers at establishments he had frequented in the past, and Long later stated that his actions were not racially motivated.

=== Legal proceedings ===
On March 17, Long was charged with eight counts of murder, split evenly between the shooting in Cherokee County and the shootings in Atlanta, and one count of aggravated assault in Cherokee County. He confessed to the killings while in custody. On May 11, Long received a 19-count indictment by a Fulton County grand jury on charges including murder, felony murder, aggravated assault, and domestic terrorism. During the press conference, district attorney Fani Willis shared her plans to seek death penalty and hate crime enhancements if Long was convicted of murder. Later that day, Long was the subject of a 23-count indictment on charges of malice murder, felony murder, attempt to commit murder, and aggravated assault from a grand jury in Cherokee County.

On July 27, Long pleaded guilty to the Cherokee County charges and was sentenced to life without parole. Cherokee County District Attorney Shannon Wallace said that investigators had found no evidence of racial bias in the shootings. On August 30, state prosecutors announced Willis had filed court papers seeking the death penalty against Long for the Fulton County charges and designating the Piedmont Road shootings as a hate crime based on race and gender. On September 28, Long pleaded not guilty to the Fulton County charges.

== Reactions ==
=== Government ===
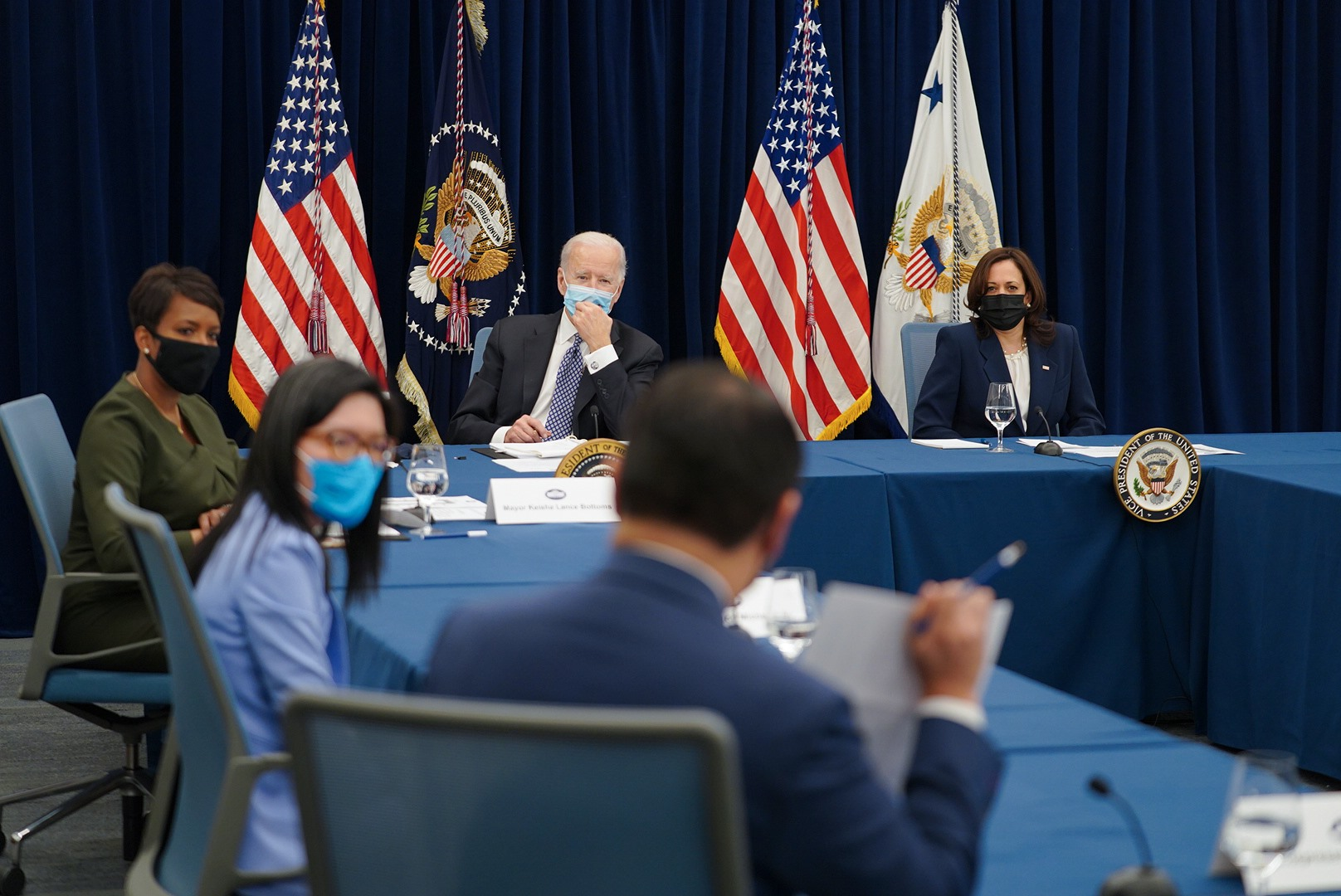
President Joe Biden, Vice President Kamala Harris, Mayor Keisha Lance Bottoms, State Senator Michelle Au, and Asian American community leaders meeting in Atlanta on March 19

On March 18, President Joe Biden ordered all U.S. flags at the White House, on other federal grounds, at military installations, on naval vessels, and at U.S. diplomatic missions to be flown at half-mast until sunset on March 22 to respect the victims of the shooting. He and Vice President Kamala Harris subsequently met with local Asian American community leaders on March 19 to discuss the shootings. After the meeting, he gave a speech condemning rising hate crimes against Asian Americans during the COVID-19 pandemic and declared his support for the proposed COVID-19 Hate Crimes Act, which he claimed would facilitate tackling anti-Asian hate crimes.

South Korean foreign minister Chung Eui-yong and national defense minister Suh Wook held a joint press conference in Seoul on March 19 with their U.S. counterparts Secretary of State Antony Blinken and Defense Secretary Lloyd Austin, and the South Korean foreign ministry released a statement the following day addressing the shooting and the United States government's anti-hate crime efforts.

On April 14, following the shootings and the overall rise in anti-Asian hate crimes, the U.S. Senate voted 92–6 to advance the COVID-19 Hate Crimes Act, which would allow the U.S. Justice Department to review hate crimes related to COVID-19 and establish an online database. On April 22, the Senate voted 94–1 to pass the COVID-19 Hate Crimes Act with bipartisan changes; Josh Hawley of Missouri was the only senator to vote in opposition. It then passed the U.S. House of Representatives by a 364–62 vote on May 18 and was signed into law by Biden on May 20.

=== Anti-Asian sentiment ===
Sociologist Nancy Wang Yuen characterized the event as "part of a nationwide pattern of Asian [women] being disproportionately targeted in hate incidents", stating that the events took place in the context of an "intersection of racism and sexism" against Asian women, citing the Page Act of 1875, and portrayals of Asian women as prostitutes in media such as the movie Full Metal Jacket and stage play Miss Saigon as examples.

According to Stop Asian Hate, nearly 11,000 attacks against the Asian American community were reported just on the mere span from March 2020 to December 2021. The FBI has also discovered an upsurge in anti-Asian hate crimes since 2019.

Georgia House of Representatives member Sam Park urged Asian Americans who are facing discrimination to reach out to the police, politicians, and the public. Another member, Bee Nguyen, said that violence against Asian Americans has increased in the last year and identified as a causative factor Donald Trump's use of the term "Chinese Virus" to refer to COVID-19. Asian-American basketball player Jeremy Lin accused Trump's rhetoric of inciting bitter hatred. A number of other athletes and public figures also made statements alleging racist motives in the attacks.

The attacks were widely covered by media in South Korea, which has close cultural ties with the United States, especially through the 1.8 million Korean Americans considered part of the Korean diaspora. The Hankyoreh called for American society to accept "the serious reality of racial bullying and hate crimes" and take steps to ensure everyone's safety regardless of race. The Kyunghyang Shinmun said the United States was "defenseless to racist attacks", while Segye Ilbo called for "effective measures so that crimes against humanity do not take root" in the United States. Mainstream American English-language media was criticized for its coverage of the shooting compared to American Korean-language and South Korean media. Issues brought up included that the former was focused more on the shooter's background, ignored the victims, and immediately dismissed racial motivations after the shooter and law enforcement claimed it was sexually motivated, while the latter instead focused on the victims, interviewed community figures and people who knew the victims, and looked at previous racist and anti-Chinese statements made by the shooter.

The shootings prompted the Chinese Canadian National Council's Toronto chapter and other groups to issue a statement calling for action against rising anti-Asian sentiment in Canada during the COVID-19 pandemic and the discrimination and violence faced by Asian workers in massage parlors and the sex industry. On March 23, the House of Commons of Canada unanimously passed a motion introduced by New Democratic Party leader Jagmeet Singh condemning the shootings and the rise of anti-Asian sentiment across North America, as well as calling on the federal government to hold a federal-provincial summit on coordinating and funding anti-hate efforts.

Advocates for sex workers said the shootings fueled fears over anti-sex work ideology. Columnist Tracy Quan commented on the incident from her perspective as an Asian American and former sex worker: "Untangling the suspect's motive isn't easy when race and sex are competing to dominate the narrative ... I've experienced bias and ethnic profiling, but I've also been a sex worker, and I have encountered more prejudice, more name-calling, more fear, bitterness, anger and hostility in connection with my sex work than regarding my race."

=== Hate crime debate ===
The shootings sparked fears of lack of security among owners and employees of Asian-owned businesses across the U.S., a debate over hate crime definitions, and criticism of the current methods used to aggregate hate crime data in the country. The New York City Police Department deployed counterterrorism officers to Asian American communities as a precaution due to the shootings. Police patrols and community outreach efforts were also increased in Seattle.

Long's statements that the shootings were not racially motivated but rather motivated by an intent to lash out at sources of temptation have spurred widespread skepticism, with members of the Congressional Asian Pacific American Caucus citing the nature of the targeted locations and the ethnicity of many of the victims. State Representative Nguyen argued that Long should be charged with a hate crime, noting that a racial motivation would not be necessary for his actions to qualify as a hate crime, since the law also applies to those who specifically target women. President Joe Biden also condemned the attacks as a hate crime, and expressed his support for hate crimes legislation recently introduced into Congress. U.S. Representative Marilyn Strickland, a Korean American from Washington state, said from the House floor that racially motivated hate crimes should be called out instead of "making excuses and rebranding it as economic anxiety or sexual addiction." Li Zhou, writing for Vox, argued that no matter whether or not the crimes were due to sexual addiction, the main motive would nonetheless coincide with factors of race and gender, since the stereotype of Asian female spa workers being prostitutes would in and of itself be a racist, misogynistic line of thinking.

On March 18, the U.S. House of Representatives held a previously scheduled congressional hearing on anti-Asian American discrimination, where Representative Chip Roy (R-TX) questioned whether the committee's attempts to prevent hate crimes and hate incidents against Asian Americans would hamper free speech. He claimed, "It seems to want to venture into the policing of rhetoric in a free society." His statement prompted criticism from Democrats.

Andrew Sullivan criticized speculation in the media about Long's motives and the assertion that his actions constitute a hate crime, saying that the media is "rushing to promote ready-made narratives, which actually point away from the empirical facts." Elizabeth Nolan Brown, writing in Reason, said that Long's motives were "still unclear, despite many in the media attributing it to anti-Asian racism". Deborah Epstein, director of Georgetown University Law Center’s Domestic Violence Clinic, claimed in an interview for NPR: "This man targeted his victims because they were Asian, and he targeted his victims because they were women. And we have to shed the blinders that limit us to seeing the race piece, but not the gender piece of hate."

Sex workers and their advocates have said that Long's attack was a hate crime against people working within the sex industry.

=== Gun reform ===
Several politicians expressed concern with how easy it was for Long to obtain a gun on the day of the shooting, with the Giffords Law Center saying he would have completed the required background check within 100 seconds. Georgia state senator Michelle Au commented, "It is easier to buy a gun here than it is to vote." Advocates said a waiting period in Georgia could have prevented spontaneous violence. The day after the killings, Satirical news site The Onion republished its 'No Way To Prevent This,' Says Only Nation Where This Regularly Happens article, with minor alterations to reflect the particular incident, as it routinely does in the aftermath of high-profile mass shootings.

Calls for gun reform were renewed when a shooting in Boulder, Colorado, occurred six days later. Senate Majority Leader Chuck Schumer (D-NY) said the Senate "must and will move forward on legislation to help stop the epidemic of gun violence". Asian American state legislators and the family of one of the victims met to discuss gun reform on May 4.

=== Criticism of sheriff's captain's phrasing ===
During a press conference on the shootings, Captain Jay Baker of the Cherokee County Sheriff's Department paraphrased what Long told investigators about his motives, saying "he was pretty much fed up and kind of at the end of his rope, and I guess it was a really bad day for him and this is what he did."

The phrase "really bad day" attracted criticism and led to the discovery of Baker's anti-Chinese sentiments on Facebook, thereby calling the integrity of the investigation into question. He has allegedly shared a Facebook post of t-shirts with the message "Covid 19 imported virus from Mainland Chy-na". Observers said he was a sympathizer with Long. Georgia State Senator Michelle Au said Baker's remarks showed that law enforcement handled crimes against particular groups differently. Representative Ted Lieu (D-Calif.) called for the FBI to conduct its own independent investigation, saying that he believed the Cherokee County Sheriff's Office investigation would be unfair because of Baker's press conference remarks and history of Facebook posts. Vincent Pan, a co-executive director of the civil rights group Chinese for Affirmative Action, said that Baker's involvement undermined Asian-American confidence that the investigation would be taken seriously.

On March 18, Sheriff Reynolds of the Cherokee County Sheriff's Office released a letter that acknowledged the criticism, expressed regret over Baker's words, and contextualized the remarks by pointing to the "difficult task" that Baker had and Baker's personal connections to the Asian-American community. The letter did not address Baker's Facebook posts. Later that day, Baker was removed from his spokesman role in the investigation. According to WSB-TV, the incident prompted the Cherokee County Sheriff Department to briefly consider handing off its role in the case to the Georgia Bureau of Investigation.

=== Protests ===
A vigil against anti-Asian violence in New York City on March 20, 2021

Violence against the Asian American community has sparked a social movement, with anti-racist messaging such as "Stop Asian Hate" becoming more prevalent. In March 2021, thousands participated in protests in Atlanta, New York City, Washington, D.C., and Montreal, denouncing anti-Asian sentiment and hate crimes.

Red Canary Song, an Asian and migrant massage parlor worker rights organization, has also protested against some of the proposed solutions which they view as counter-productive, such as increased policing and pressure to shut down massage parlors entirely. They have promoted efforts to de-stigmatize massage parlors, advocate for decriminalization of sex work, and encourage positive cultural changes that would affirm the dignity of massage parlor workers.

== See also ==
- Toronto machete attack
