= Baker's Supermarkets =

American supermarket chain

Baker's Supermarkets, Inc.

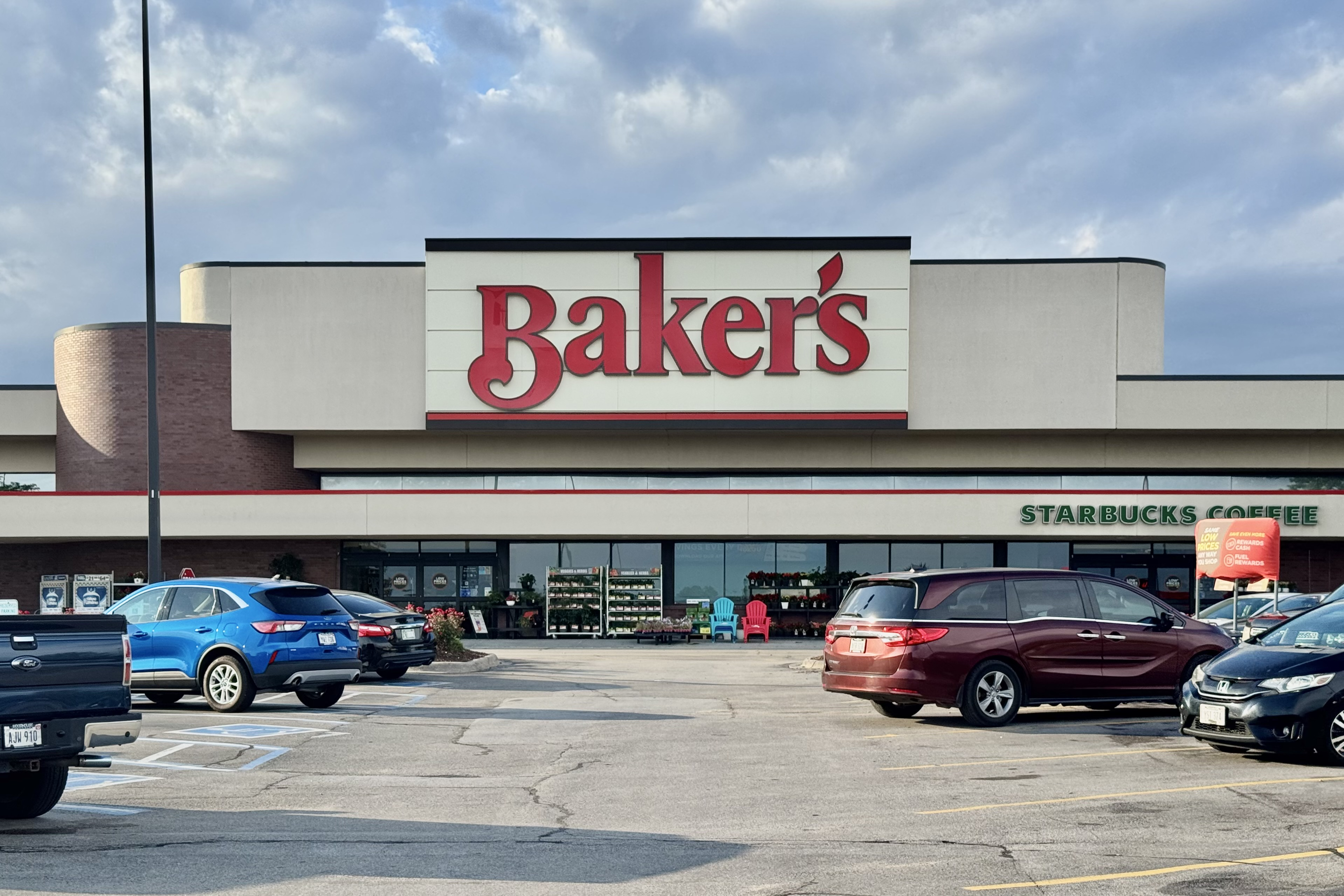
- A Baker's Supermarket in Omaha, Nebraska, 2026
- Type: Subsidiary
- Industry: Retail
- Founded: 1927; 99 years ago
- Products: supermarkets/food-drug stores
- Parent: Fleming Companies (1992–2001); Dillons (2001–present)
- Website: www.bakersplus.com

Baker's is a supermarket chain operating primarily in the Omaha–Council Bluffs metropolitan area. It is owned by Kroger.

== History ==
Abraham Baker opened his first grocery store in Walnut, Iowa, in 1927. His first Omaha-area store opened in Bellevue, Nebraska, in 1947, and his first in Omaha itself at 73rd and Maple streets opened in 1957.

In 1971, Abraham's two sons, Jack and Bob, took on more management responsibility. In 1972, The Jewel Companies, Inc. made a deal with Baker's to open a Turn Style/Baker's Family Center in Omaha. As revenues began to decline, the Baker family sold the chain to food wholesaler Fleming Companies, Inc, in 1992. The Kroger Company purchased the Baker's stores from Fleming in 2001 (after having outbid Albertsons to acquire the chain), after Fleming ran into financial problems.

In 2004, three former Albertsons supermarkets in Omaha were purchased and turned into Baker's stores after Albertsons withdrew from the Omaha market. Baker's today is run under the Dillons division, which includes Baker's, Dillons, and Gerbes.
