= Red Canary Song =

American grassroots coalition

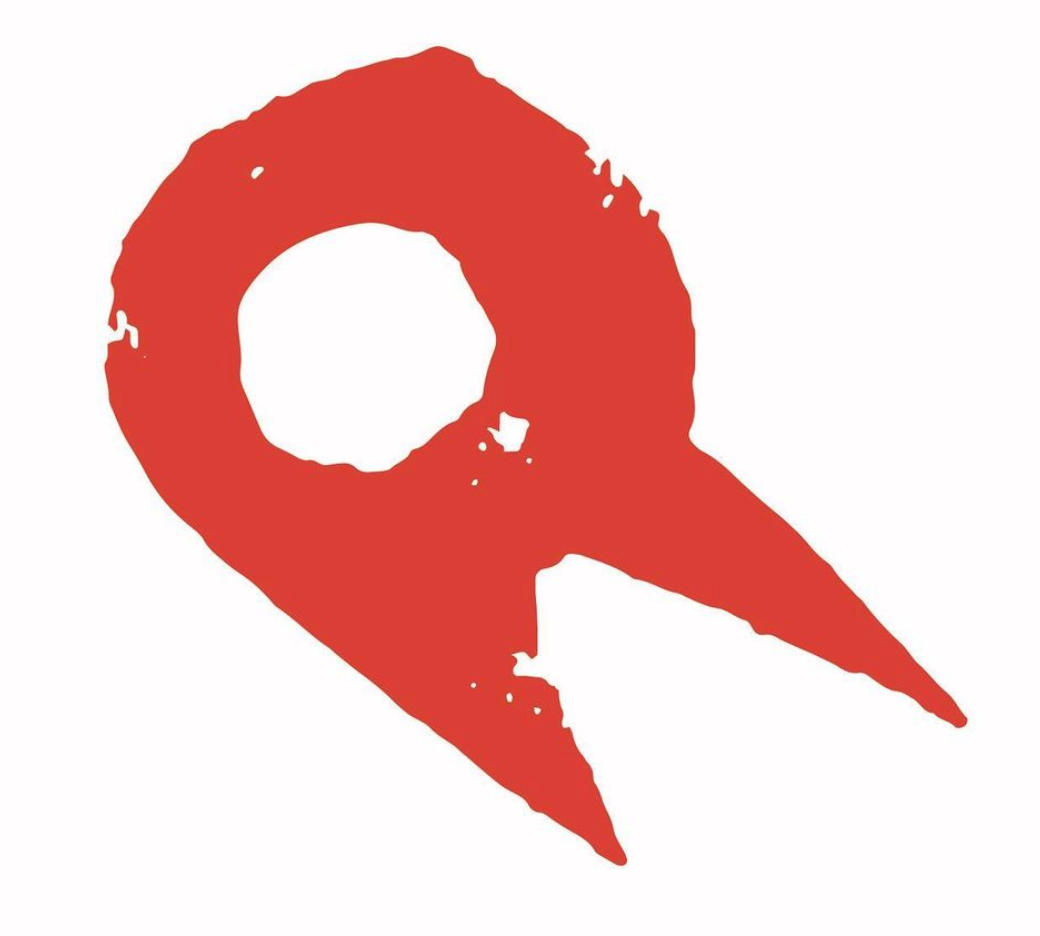
- Founded: November 2018 in Flushing, Queens
- Founder: Kate Zen, Athena G., Red S., and Julie X.
- Region served: United States
- Method: Grassroots
- Website: www.redcanarysong.net

Red Canary Song is an American grassroots coalition that advocates for the rights of Asian and migrant massage parlor workers. The coalition works to provide political representation, labor rights, collective organizing for migrant massage workers, and protection from violence by police and police impersonators across the United States and within the diaspora in Toronto, Paris, and Hong Kong.

== History ==
Red Canary Song was founded in November 2018 by Kate Z., Athena G., Red S., and Julie X. following the death of 38-year-old Flushing, Queens massage worker Yang Song on November 25, 2017, when she fell four stories to her death during a police raid. The collective is modelled after Butterfly in Toronto, and created as a sister organization to Butterfly, with the support of allies at the Asian American Feminist Collective, Queens Neighborhoods United, the Chinese Feminist Collective, NYCOSH Nail Salon workers coalition, Communities Allied Against Anti-Asian Violence (CAAAV), Street Vendor Project, Make the Road NY Trans Immigrant Project, and other coalition orgs of DecrimNY.

As of 2021, the group is currently based in Flushing, and directed by Yin Q. and Esther Kao. The organizing that became Red Canary Song in 2018 started as a protest in 2017 outside the 109th Precinct shortly after Song's death to fight for police accountability. The coalition strives to address the hypersexualization and xenophobia that massage workers are likely to fall victim to, as made apparent by the 2021 Atlanta spa shootings. Red Canary Song advocates that criminalizing massage workers and shutting down massage businesses is not the proper means of ensuring massage workers a better quality of life. Rather, the solution lies in recognizing the rights and dignity of these workers, while supporting them to organize for worker power. While Red Canary Song is currently directed by Asian American sex workers and artists, it supports all migrant massage workers, and the coalition does not wish to impose the assumption nor the identity of migrant sex workers upon anyone.

== See also ==
- 2021 Atlanta spa shootings
- Xenophobia and racism related to the COVID-19 pandemic
- Page Act of 1875
- Asian fetish
- Sex positive feminism
- Anti-Chinese sentiment
- Stop Asian Hate
