= Dillons =

Supermarket located in the Midwest and owned by Kroger

Dillon Companies, Inc.

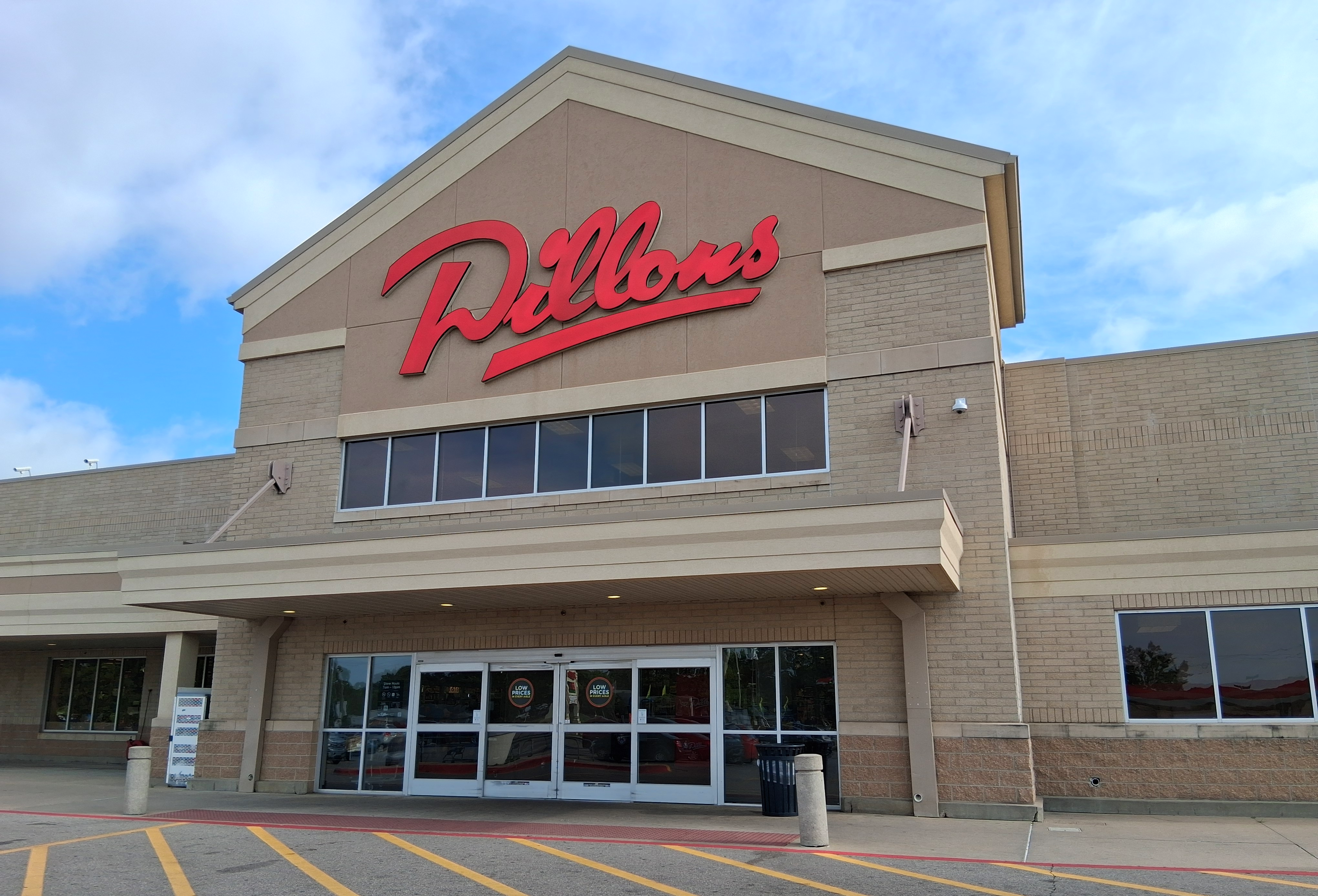
- A Dillons in Wichita, Kansas (2026)
- Formerly: J.S. Dillon Cash Store (1913–1917); Dillon Mercantile Company, Inc (1917–1921); J.S. Dillon and Sons Company (1921–1968); Dillons Companies Inc. (1968–1983)
- Type: Subsidiary
- Industry: Retail / grocery
- Predecessor: Sterling General Store (1890–1913)
- Founded: As a general store 1890; 136 years ago in Sterling, Kansas, U.S. As a grocery store 1913; 113 years ago in Hutchinson, Kansas, U.S.
- Founder: John S. Dillon
- Headquarters: Hutchinson, Kansas, U.S.
- Number of locations: 94
- Area served: Kansas
- Key people: Robert G. Miller (chairman, CEO) B. Kevin Turner (vice chairman); Bob Gordon (EVP and general counsel)
- Products: Bakery, dairy, delicatessen, frozen foods, general grocery, lottery, pharmacy, seafood, produce, meats, snack food, liquor, and salad bar
- Services: Supermarket
- Revenue: ▲US$2 billion (2021)
- Number of employees: ▲11,500 (2021)
- Parent: Kroger (1983–present)
- Divisions: Baker's; Gerbes
- Website: www.dillons.com

Dillons is a regional grocery supermarket chain based in Hutchinson, Kansas, and is a division of Kroger. Other banners under the Dillon Stores Division include Gerbes in Missouri and Baker's in Omaha, Nebraska. Dillons operates grocery stores throughout Kansas with major influences in and around Wichita, Topeka, Manhattan, and Lawrence. Dillons also operates distribution centers in Goddard and Hutchinson.

== History ==
In 1890, John S. Dillon opened a general store in Sterling, Kansas, and learned that allowing customers to charge then pay later and delivering groceries to their homes was a financial and manpower strain on his business. In 1913, he opened his "J.S. Dillon Cash Store" in Hutchinson, Kansas employed a new marketing concept called cash and carry, where the store would not offer credit or delivery services. Dillon opened a second store in 1915 that he managed then placed his son, Ray E. Dillon, in charge of the original store. In 1917, the company was incorporated under the name "Dillon Mercantile Company, Inc". Due to his sons John and Ray both being overseas in France during World War I, Dillon sold his company to his investment partners, but soon afterward both sons returned. They opened a new store called "J.S. Dillon and Sons Store" in 1919 and incorporated in 1921.

In 1983, Dillon Companies, Inc., was acquired by The Kroger Company of Cincinnati, Ohio, creating a nationwide grocery chain. Several years later, David Dillon was named Kroger's president and COO and became CEO in 2003. Dillon retired from that position effective January 1, 2014.

In 2006, Kroger opened the first Dillons Marketplace in Wichita. The concept, similar to Kroger's Fred Meyer chain, is 110,000 square feet (10,000 m^{2}) of grocery and general merchandise.

On February 12, 2015, the same year the 4 Springfield Missouri Dillons stores closed, the Dillons pharmacy location in Joplin was shuttered, four years after the Dillons store in Joplin was destroyed by the 2011 Joplin tornado.

== Gerbes ==
In 1933, Frank J. Gerbes founded Gerbes Super Markets, Inc. in Tipton, Missouri. The location in Tipton closed in 2007.

In 1966, Gerbes merged with the Dillon Companies and has been a division ever since. As of 2026, Kroger currently operates six stores under the Gerbes banner in Mid-Missouri.

== See also ==
- City Market
- Fry's Food and Drug
- King Soopers
