= 2021 Boulder shooting =

Mass shooting in Colorado, U.S.

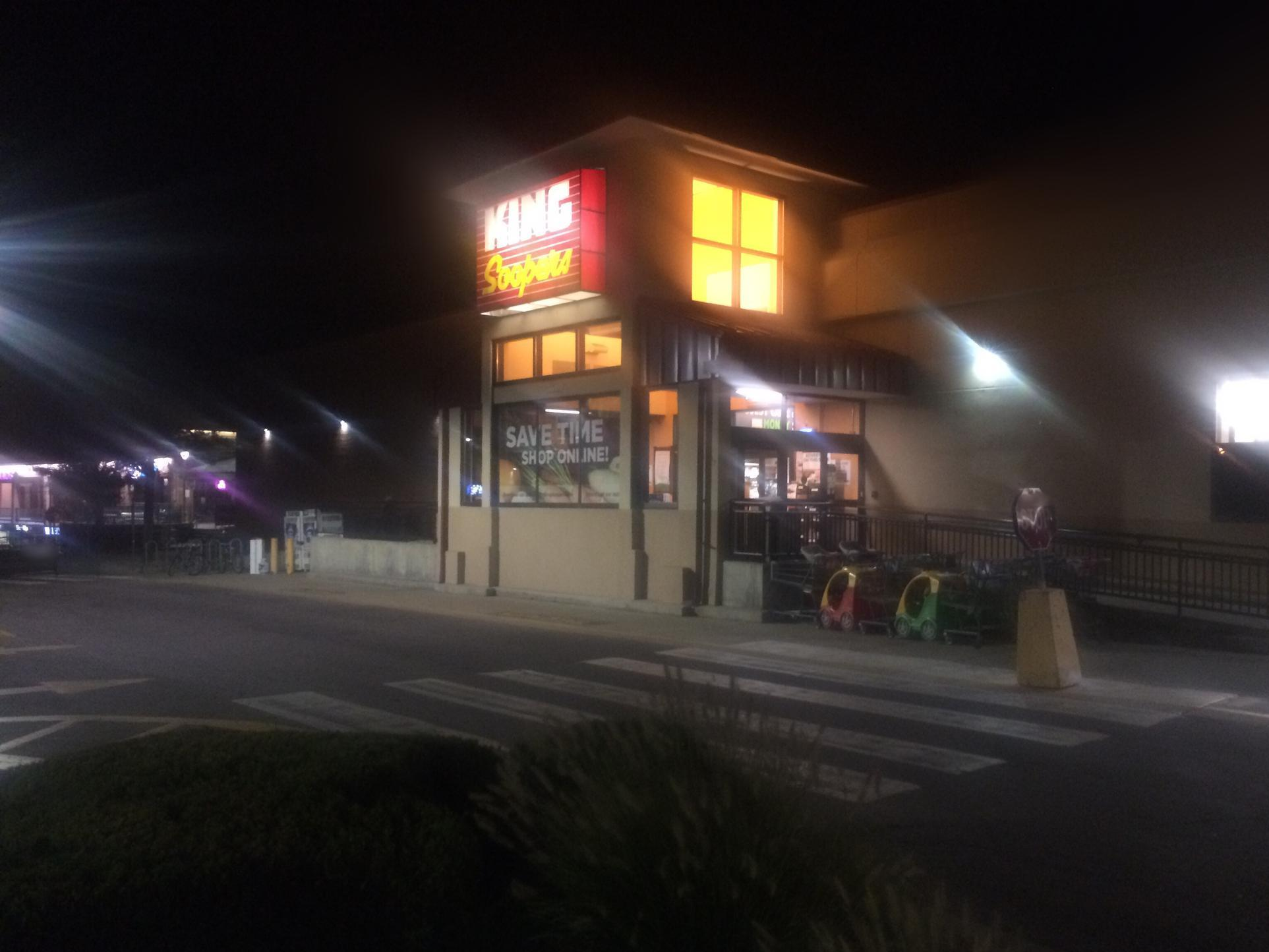
- The King Soopers supermarket where the shooting took place (pictured 2019)
- Location: 39°59′01″N 105°15′05″W; Table Mesa neighborhood of Boulder, Colorado, U.S.
- Date: March 22, 2021; 5 years ago c. 2:30 – 3:28 p.m. (MDT; UTC−06:00)
- Target: People at a King Soopers supermarket
- Attack type: Mass shooting; mass murder; shootout
- Weapons: Ruger AR-556 pistol; Girsan MC28SA 9x19mm Semi-automatic handgun (unused)
- Deaths: 10
- Injuries: 2 (including the perpetrator) (Note: The shooter was injured by a gunshot wound to the thigh, fired by a responding police officer, while the other injury was a woman who fractured her back while fleeing from the store.)
- Perpetrator: Ahmad Al Aliwi Al-Issa
- Verdict: Guilty
- Convictions: 55 including: 10 counts of first-degree murder; 38 counts of attempted murder; 1 count of first-degree assault; 6 counts of using a high-capacity magazine

On March 22, 2021, a mass shooting occurred at a King Soopers supermarket in Boulder, Colorado, United States. Ten people were killed, including a local on-duty police officer. The shooter, 21-year-old Ahmad Al Aliwi Al-Issa, was arrested after being shot in the right leg. He was temporarily hospitalized before being moved to the county jail. After undergoing mental evaluations during the legal proceedings, Al-Issa was found mentally incompetent to stand trial in December 2021 and in April 2022. On August 23, 2023, prosecutors announced that Al-Issa was mentally competent to stand trial; a judge ruled as such on October 6 of that same year. On September 23, 2024, Al-Issa was found guilty in the shooting and sentenced to life in prison without the possibility of parole.

== Events ==
=== Shooting ===
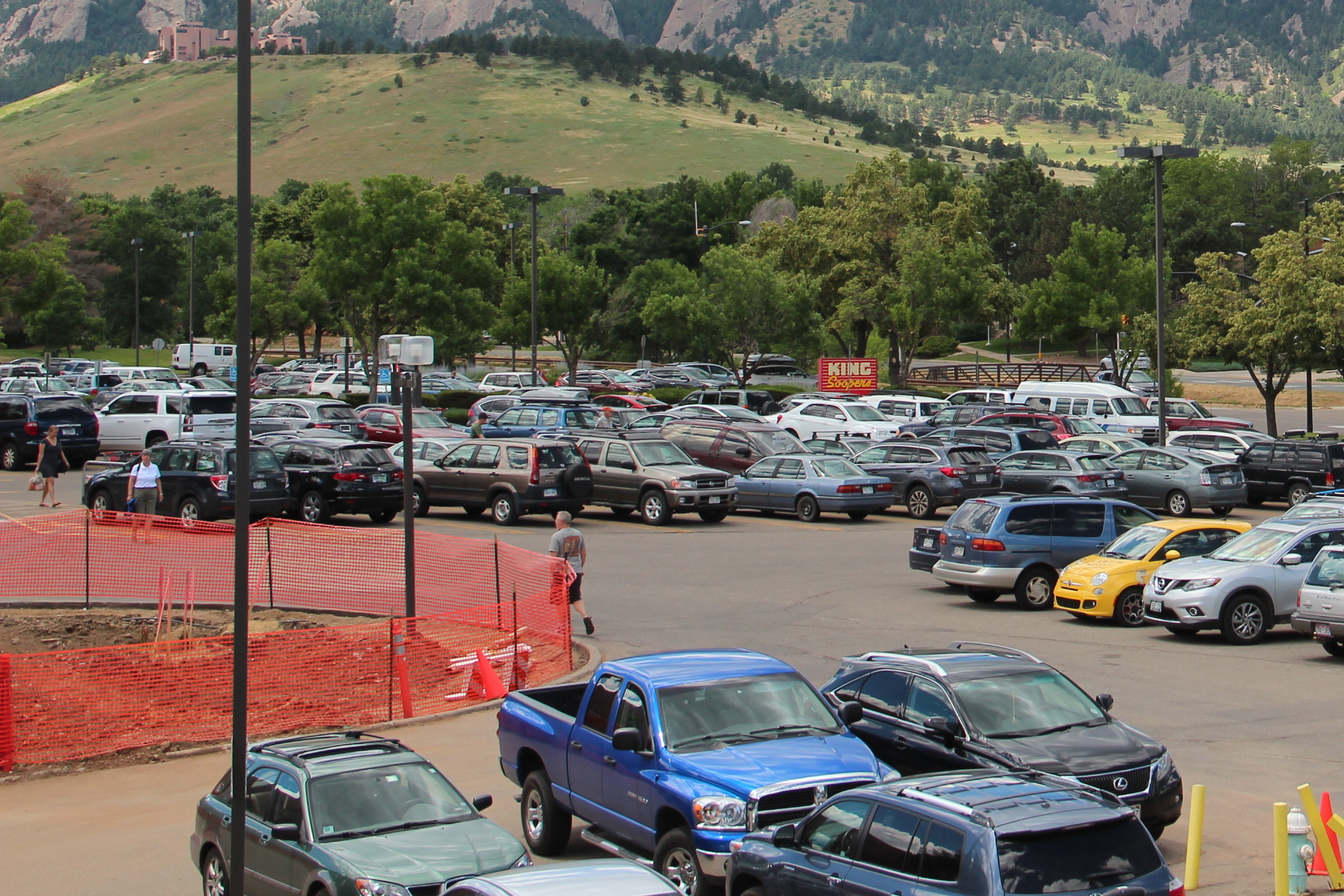
The King Soopers parking lot, where the shooting began (pictured 2016)

The shooting began shortly after 2:30 p.m. MDT (20:30 UTC) when a gunman entered the parking lot of a King Soopers supermarket and began to fire at people. He was described by witnesses as wearing an "armored" vest and holding a "rifle", which turned out to be a semi-automatic Ruger AR-556 AR-15 style pistol that was used in the shooting; he also carried a 9mm semi-automatic handgun. He was first seen by employees and customers who watched him shoot at customers in the parking lot before turning and entering the store. At the time, there were at least 115 people inside the building and at least 25 others in the parking lot.

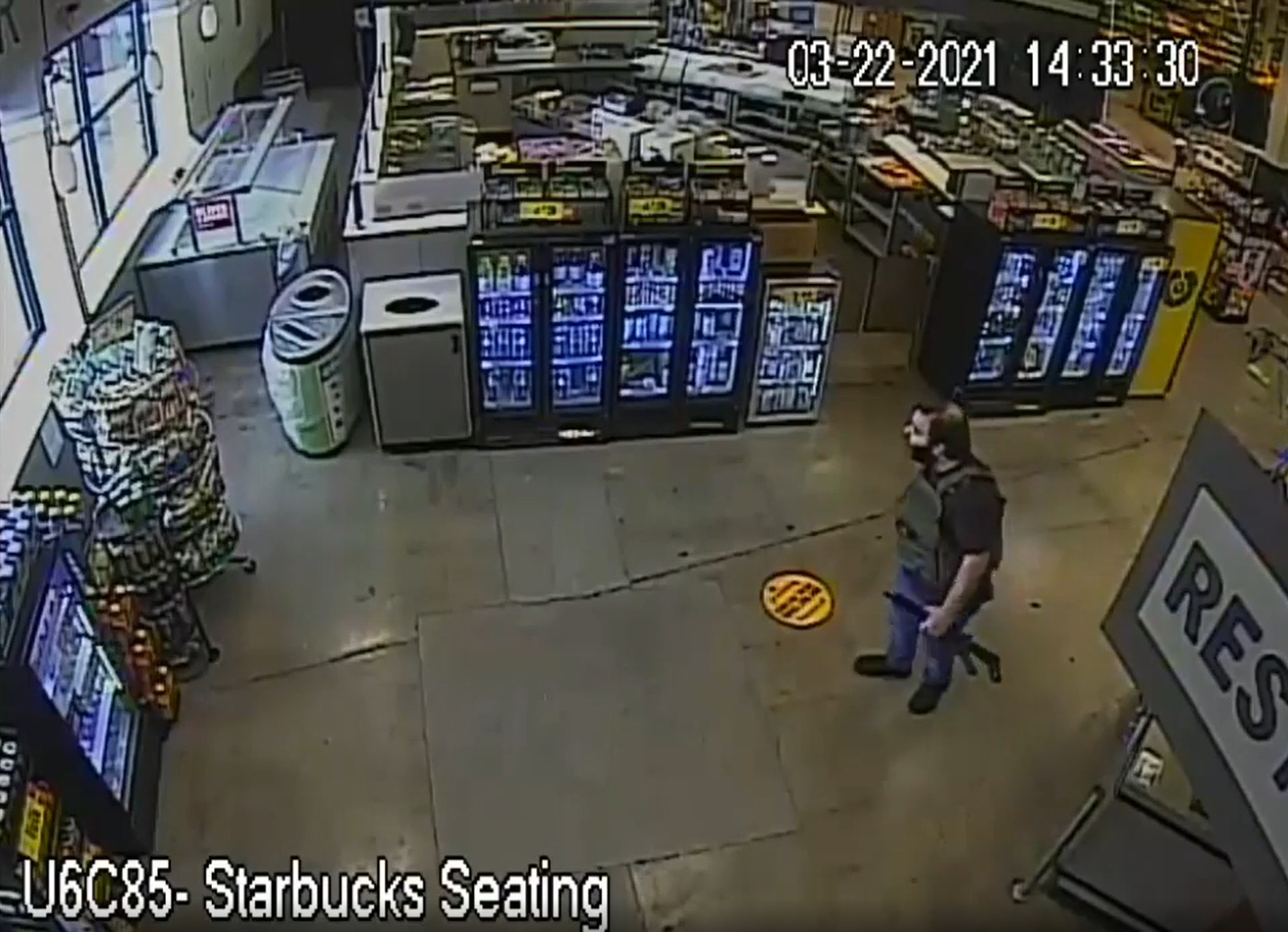
Al-Issa inside the supermarket during the shooting

The first victim was a repairman who was killed in a van parked next to the gunman's vehicle. The gunman then walked towards the store; along the way, he killed another person in the parking lot who was trying to flee, shooting him multiple times. Next, he killed one more person while entering the store through its eastern entrance.

A man waiting in line with his family for his COVID-19 vaccine at the store's pharmacy witnessed the gunman shoot a woman at the front of the line before finding safety in a coat closet with his family. Some customers and employees reached safety through a back exit for the supermarket. Some were praised for their actions in helping evacuate and hide individuals away from the gunman.

At 2:33 p.m., the Boulder Police Department began receiving calls of a person with a "patrol rifle" in the area and shots being fired. Witnesses at the scene reported hearing anywhere from 10 to 30 shots fired in rapid succession by the gunman. At 2:34 p.m., a Boulder Police dispatcher provided an initial description of the gunman as "a white male, middle-aged, dark hair, beard, black vest, short-sleeved shirt." The first three responding officers arrived at the scene within two minutes of the first calls and entered the store within 30 seconds of their arrival; at around 2:37 p.m., one of the other officers radioed in to say that they were going in. Running towards gunfire, one of the officers, Eric Talley, was shot and killed by the gunman. He was the last victim in the shooting, according to Boulder police.

=== Additional emergency response ===
Less than 30 seconds after Talley's death, additional officers entered the store. By 2:39 p.m., responding officers reported being fired upon repeatedly by the gunman. At around the same time, an armored police vehicle was used to break the store's front windows. Officers engaged the gunman in a shootout from 3 p.m. to 3:21 p.m. They also used a sound system to order him to surrender. According to police and witnesses, the gunman was laughing and occasionally mumbling. A store employee said that while she was hiding, she heard gunshots and screams and then only the store music and phones ringing afterward.

Police did not enter the store again until 3:22 p.m., fearing an ambush. When a team of ten officers from multiple agencies reentered, they encountered the gunman at one of the aisles within 20 seconds of their entry; he fired at them at least twice. One of the officers returned fire on two different occasions, eventually striking the gunman in the thigh. He surrendered by saying, "I surrender. I'm naked", and at 3:28 p.m., he was taken into custody using Talley's handcuffs. He had a leg gunshot wound at the time of his arrest, so he was first transported to Boulder Community Health Foothills Hospital. Police eventually transferred him to the Boulder County Jail, where he was held without bond.

The assailant discharged his rifle 47 times during the shooting.

After the gunman was taken into custody, police searched through the store and evacuated people who had remained inside. A shelter-in-place order was issued in the area at 4:18 p.m. and lifted at 6:40 p.m. Up to 15 agencies responded to the shooting, including the Jefferson County SWAT, the Boulder Sheriff's Office, the University of Colorado Police Department, the FBI, the ATF, and local police departments. A fire department ladder truck was used to get a SWAT team onto the roof. At least three medical helicopters were summoned to a staging area at nearby Fairview High School.

== Victims ==
Ten people were killed:

- Tralona Bartkowiak, 49; customer
- Suzanne Fountain, 59; customer
- Teri Leiker, 51; employee
- Kevin Mahoney, 61; customer
- Lynn Murray, 62; customer
- Rikki Olds, 25; manager
- Neven Stanišić, 23; repairman
- Denny Stong, 20; employee
- Eric Talley, 51; police officer
- Jody Waters, 65; customer

Officer Talley, who had been working with the Boulder Police Department since 2010, was one of the first police officers to arrive at the scene. His death marked the first time a Boulder police officer was killed in the line of duty since 1994 and only the sixth such death in the department's history. Seven of the victims died inside the store, while the other three died outside.

While Boulder Police Chief Maris Herold initially said several other police officers were injured during the response, the department later said that no other officers were injured. Aside from the suspect who was wounded by police, the only other injury from the shooting was a woman who fractured her back while trying to escape.

== Perpetrator ==
Ahmad Al Aliwi Al-Issa (or Alissa), then aged 21, is from nearby Arvada, Colorado. He was born in Raqqa, Syria, on April 17, 1999, and became a naturalized U.S. citizen. His family immigrated to the U.S. in 2002 and moved to Arvada in 2014. Al-Issa's older brother said that Al-Issa has a history of paranoid, disturbed, and antisocial behavior that developed after Al-Issa was bullied in high school, and his brother was concerned for his mental health. Al-Issa was convicted of a misdemeanor in 2018 for punching a classmate at Arvada West High School. He pleaded guilty to an assault charge in relation to the incident, received a year of probation, and was ordered to undergo 48 hours of community service.

According to a police affidavit, Al-Issa bought a semi-automatic Ruger AR-556 pistol. Boulder police clarified in a news conference on March 26 that they believed the AR-556 pistol was the only weapon used by the suspect during the shooting and added that he also had a 9mm handgun with him. Al-Issa's identity was already known to the Federal Bureau of Investigation due to a link to another person under investigation by law enforcement officials.

Al-Issa expressed on Facebook and to his former high school wrestling teammates that he believed he was being targeted for harassment due to racism and Islamophobia. According to SITE Intelligence Group, "there was no indication on his Facebook account that suggested radical views of any kind, whether it be Islamist, anti-Trump, or anything else." Al-Issa's brother said he believed that the shootings were not a political statement. The Boulder County District Attorney waited to reveal more information about Al-Issa's motives while the FBI and other agencies were investigating the case, to help ensure a fair trial.

== Aftermath ==
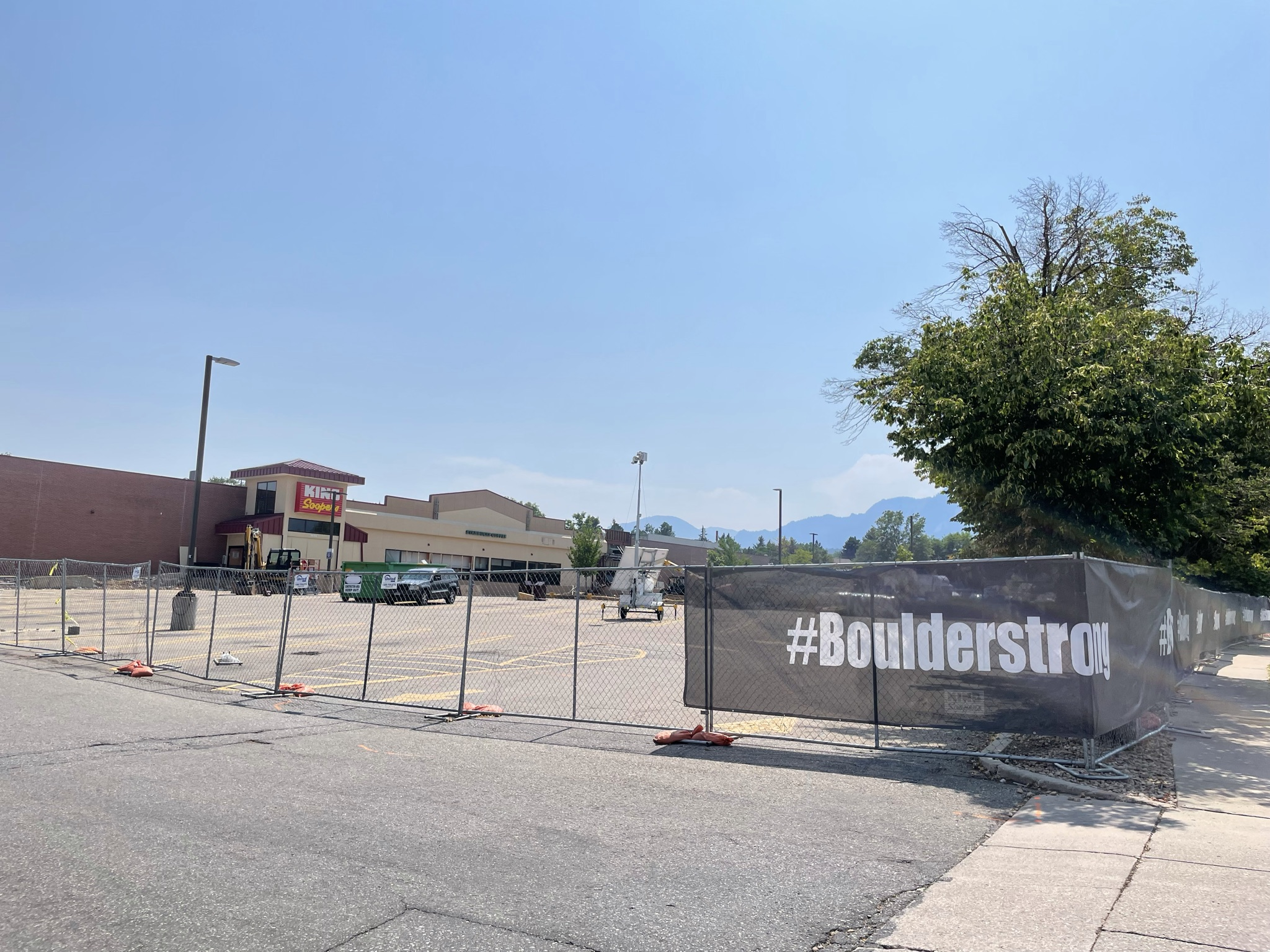
Parking lot pictured in August 2021. Fence reads "#BoulderStrong"

At around 8 p.m. on the day of the shooting, a procession honored Officer Eric Talley as his body was being taken to a funeral home. A separate memorial for the victims was created along a chain-link fence bordering the store, as mourners placed candles, flowers, and other items along its base or through the chain-link. The Museum of Boulder began collecting and preserving stories and artifacts from the memorial. On April 16, it started planning both short-term and permanent memorials with the City of Boulder. On May 12, the store was announced to be undergoing extensive renovations, with the expectation that it would reopen in late fall 2021.

Governor Jared Polis ordered the state's flags to fly at half-staff for ten days: one day for each victim. President Joe Biden also ordered flags on federal property nationwide to be flown at half-staff. This order came on the same day as the expiration of a federal order to fly flags at half-staff to honor the victims of the Atlanta spa shootings of March 16, less than a week before. A week after the shooting, Talley's funeral was held; it included a 21-gun salute and another procession.

Sports teams in Colorado and victims of other mass shootings expressed sympathy for the victims and family members of the Boulder shooting. A vigil for the victims and survivors of the shooting was held on March 25. U.S. Representative Joe Neguse, whose district includes Boulder, spoke at the vigil about curbing gun violence. University of Colorado Boulder professor and poet Khadijah Queen also spoke at the vigil, which was organized by gun violence prevention group Moms Demand Action. In an interview with CNN's Anderson Cooper that day, the family of one of the victims spoke about him and their appreciation for the outpouring of support.

As of June 29, more than $8 million in donations were collected by more than a dozen funds, primarily ones set up by Community Foundation Boulder County and the Colorado Healing Fund. However, victims' families criticized the organizations' distribution of the donations, saying that they were forced to produce bills and bank statements to receive support and that they were not given sufficient input into the money's distribution. They have since called for an independent audit into the distribution's methods.

The store remained closed for remodeling for almost a year. It was scheduled to reopen in January 2022, but the reopening was delayed due to a union strike until February 9. The redesigned store, including a prominent mural at the entrance, was previewed to the media the evening before. The reopening ceremony featured first responders and store employees. Dignitaries included King Soopers president Joe Kelly, Mayor Aaron Brockett, and Polis, a Boulder resident.

== Investigation ==
After the shooting, police investigated if Al-Issa used a 30-round magazine in the shooting, and also whether other firearms were connected to him. They found that he was equipped with ten high-capacity magazines, all of which were found on him, or in his car parked outside the store. Subsequent to other mass shootings, possession of high-capacity magazines was banned in Colorado after 2013. The Boulder District Attorney said that there was no evidence the magazines were sold or obtained illegally, but that Al-Issa broke laws by having them on his person and in his vehicle.

== Legal proceedings ==
After the shooting, Al-Issa was charged with ten counts of first-degree murder and one count of attempted murder. Al-Issa's identity was revealed to the public on March 23, the day after the shooting. At Al-Issa's first court appearance on March 25, his lawyer asked for a mental health assessment. It was later reported that, due to "safety concerns and threats", Al-Issa was moved to another county.

On April 22, Al-Issa was charged with 43 new felony charges, including 32 counts of attempted murder, 10 counts of using a high-capacity magazine, and one count of first-degree assault. The 32 counts of attempted murder include those of 11 police officers, along with a number of civilians.

On May 25, Al-Issa was charged with 13 additional counts of attempted murder and 47 "crime of violence sentence enhancers". His next court appearance was a preliminary hearing scheduled for September 7. However, on September 1, Al-Issa's lawyers filed a motion to raise the issue of their client's mental competency during the trial, and the preliminary hearing was changed to an advisement hearing. On September 7, Al-Issa was ordered to undergo a competency evaluation at the Boulder County Jail, to be completed within three weeks. On September 28, the evaluation's due date was delayed to October 11, while a hearing to review the results was rescheduled for October 14.

On October 11, psychologists expressed their beliefs that Al-Issa was mentally incompetent to proceed with the trial. On October 14, a judge granted the district attorney's request to have Al-Issa undergo a second evaluation. The protracted process of determining Al-Issa's competency was criticized by the family of shooting victim Rikki Olds, who said Al-Issa was competent enough to plan and carry out the shooting.

On December 3, a judge ruled that Al-Issa was mentally incompetent to stand trial. He has been held at Colorado Mental Health Institute since that month. On April 15, 2022, a judge ruled that Al-Issa was still mentally incompetent to stand trial. Six months later, on October 21, a judge ruled Al-Issa still incompetent for trial and set his next review hearing for January 27, 2023, when he was again deemed mentally incompetent for trial. In the meantime, the Colorado Mental Health Institute must provide monthly condition updates to the court. Based on doctors' assessments, District Attorney Michael Dougherty expected the defendant's competency will improve, that he will be able to stand trial and justice will be served.

On August 23, 2023, prosecutors announced that Al-Issa was mentally competent to stand trial. On October 6, 2023, a judge ruled that Al-Issa was mentally competent to stand trial.

On November 14, 2023, he pleaded not guilty by reason of insanity; his bond was set at $100 million. The trial date was tentatively set for August 2024 with the jury selection scheduled to begin early that month. On May 7, 2024, the trial was delayed to September 2, 2024.

Jury selection began on August 26, 2024, and opening statements were made on September 5. After a two-week trial, the jury deliberated on September 20 and 23 before finding Al-Issa guilty of 10 counts of first-degree murder, 38 counts of attempted murder, one count of first-degree assault and six counts of using a high-capacity magazine.

Later that day, he was sentenced to 10 consecutive life sentences without parole plus 1334 years. Death penalty was not considered, since Colorado abolished it a year before the shooting.

== Reactions ==
=== Gun control debate ===
==== Ruger AR-556 purchase and classification ====
Al-Issa legally purchased a Ruger AR-556 pistol on March 16 at a local gun shop in Arvada that used Colorado's universal background check law, even though he was previously convicted of third-degree assault, a misdemeanor with a sentencing maximum of 18 months in county jail. Federal firearms laws only prohibit weapons purchases for those convicted of a felony, or a misdemeanor with a prison term of over 24 months. He was reported to be carrying a 9 mm handgun in addition to his primary weapon.

President Biden delivered remarks on the shooting the day after. (transcript)

On March 12, four days before Al-Issa bought his Ruger AR-556 pistol and ten days before the shooting, a Boulder County judge had blocked a ban on the sale and possession of assault weapons and large capacity magazines. The judge ruled in a lawsuit supported by the NRA Institute for Legislative Action (NRA-ILA) to strike down the ban. The ban had been passed in Boulder in 2018 after the Stoneman Douglas High School shooting. Following the Boulder shooting, discussion was renewed on the topic of gun control. Particular discussion was raised over the Ruger AR-556 pistol, a type of AR-15 style rifle with a modified arm brace, legally defined as a pistol and not a rifle according to gun control laws.

Semi-automatic AR-15-style rifles are modeled after the automatic ArmaLite AR-15 rifle. As a pistol, the Ruger AR-556 is not bound by stricter regulations placed on rifles, and pistols usually aren't included in definitions of assault weapons. According to the federal Gun Control Act of 1968, a pistol is "designed to be gripped by one hand"; a rifle is a weapon designed "to be fired from the shoulder" with a single bullet fired for each pull of the trigger, among other criteria. As a result of this, the Ruger AR-556 pistol is designed with a 10.5-inch barrel and is sold with an adjustable stabilizing brace, as opposed to a stock (which would cause the AR-556 to be classified as a short-barreled rifle under the National Firearms Act of 1934), making it legally a pistol even though it is visually and operationally similar to a rifle. Similar to AR-15 style rifles, Ruger AR-556 magazines typically have a capacity of 30 rounds; but since Colorado law prohibits magazines carrying more than 15 rounds, some retailers sell a Colorado-specific version of the gun that comes with a magazine that holds under 15 rounds. NRA member and longtime gun violence researcher Garen Wintemute, a UC Davis Medical Center physician who is the director of the university's Violence Prevention Research Program, expressed concerns about the Ruger AR-556 pistol's "lethality over conventional handguns." Professor Joseph Vince, a former Bureau of Alcohol, Tobacco, Firearms and Explosives (ATF) agent and current director of Mount St. Mary's University's Criminal Justice Programs, said about the Ruger AR-556 pistol, "It's not a sporting rifle, it's not a hunting rifle. It's made for the military and short-range combat."

==== Government and public discussion ====
At the national level, President Joe Biden called for an immediate ban on assault weapons; other Democratic politicians echoed his sentiments, including U.S. Senator Dianne Feinstein of California, U.S. Representative Joe Neguse of Colorado, and former President Barack Obama. Biden also urged that loopholes be closed in the background check system and praised Officer Eric Talley, who was killed in the shooting, for his heroism. In an interview with CBS This Morning, Vice President Kamala Harris responded to the mass shootings by discussing the need for gun reform legislation.

Similar calls for gun control and loopholes to be closed were echoed by newspaper editorial boards, and many celebrities. Satirical news site The Onion republished its 'No Way To Prevent This,' Says Only Nation Where This Regularly Happens article the day following the shooting.

Republican politicians, such as Senator Ted Cruz of Texas and Senator Josh Hawley of Missouri, have criticized the renewed push for gun control, saying that they believe gun control does not help lessen crime. Most Democratic members of Congress supported gun safety bills, and the House of Representatives (which had a Democratic majority at the time) passed two bills to create universal background checks. However, Democratic Senator Joe Manchin opposed the House-passed bills, favoring instead a narrow bill he co-authored with Republican Senator Pat Toomey shortly after the Sandy Hook school shooting.

On April 8, Biden announced an executive order in response to the Boulder shooting that called for the U.S. Justice Department to clarify within 60 days whether a gun marketed with a stabilizing brace, such as the Ruger AR-556, effectively turns a pistol into a short-barreled rifle. On June 7, the Justice Department announced that Attorney General Merrick Garland signed proposed rule 2021R-08, "Factoring Criteria for Firearms with Attached 'Stabilizing Braces,'" to make this clarification by September 8. Under the proposed clarification, the definition for the term "rifle" would include "any weapon with a rifled barrel and equipped with an attached 'stabilizing brace' that has objective design features and characteristics that indicate that the firearm is designed to be fired from the shoulder." The proposed criteria would determine whether firearms equipped with a stabilizing brace are a "rifle" or "short-barreled rifle" under the Gun Control Act of 1968, or a "rifle" or "firearm" subject to National Firearms Act regulations. The proposed restrictions to amend regulations would not apply to stabilizing braces used by individuals with disabilities.

On January 13, 2023 the U.S. Justice Department finalized its ruling to close a loophole that allowed pistols to be converted into short-barreled rifles through the use of attached stabilizing braces, such as the gun used in the Boulder shooting. The ruling with additional regulations was announced by Attorney General Merrick Garland and ATF Director Steve Dettelbach.

==== Changes to Colorado's gun laws ====
The shooting led to the passage of gun reform legislation in the Colorado General Assembly. On April 20, Governor Jared Polis signed two gun control bills into law. One requires gun owners to report lost or stolen firearms within five days or be fined. The other is a safe storage law that mandates standards on gun storage, such as requiring licensed gun dealers to provide locking devices during firearm sales or transfers. The bills, which passed in the Colorado General Assembly following party-line votes, had been introduced before the shooting.

In late April, Democratic state lawmakers announced proposed gun control legislation that would create an Office of Gun Violence Prevention within the Colorado Department of Public Health and Environment, expand background checks, and allow municipalities to enact their own gun control laws. The proposed legislation would be the first of its kind since gun control bills were passed in 2013. Republican state legislators opposed the legislation. In May, the Colorado Senate passed SB 256, which repealed the state's ban on city and county governments enacting gun laws stricter than the state law. The bill passed on a party-line vote, 19–15, and went to the state House. A separate bill, HB 1298, would close the "Charleston loophole", which allows a licensed gun dealer to transfer a gun to a buyer if the background check has not been completed within three days; require licensed gun dealer to obtain Colorado Bureau of Investigation approval before transferring a gun; and ban persons convicted of a violent misdemeanor from buying a firearm for five years. HB 1298 was approved by the state House Judiciary Committee on a 7–4 party-line vote. The bills were signed into law by Polis in June.

=== Media coverage and discussion ===
A man who livestreamed the crime to a YouTube channel received criticism from some and praise from others. He had identified himself repeatedly as a journalist to law enforcement before being removed from the scene. At peak viewership during the event, the livestream had about 30,000 viewers, and many criticized YouTube for allowing the video to remain on its site. The company responded with a statement that the video had enough news or documentary context to remain, regardless of the violence shown.

Before officers arrived on the scene, a police dispatcher described the active shooter as a "white male"; the suspect's actual identity was released around 18 hours after the shooting. A police affidavit dated March 23 repeated Al-Issa's identity as a "white male". Deborah Richardson, ACLU of Colorado's executive director, said that early assumptions made by law enforcement about Al-Issa were affected by the perception that he was white.

On March 22, before the suspect's identity was made public, the Indian American race-and-inclusion editor of USA Today's Sports Media Group, Hemal Jhaveri, reacted to the shooting on Twitter, inaccurately saying, "It's always an angry white man. Always." She later expressed "regret" for the "careless error of judgment" in sending the tweet, and deleted it. By March 26, Jhaveri had been fired by USA Today, with her attributing this to the tweet and its promotion by "several high profile alt-right Twitter" users "as an example of anti-white bias and racism against whites". USA Today did not directly comment on her firing, instead stressing their commitment to "diversity, equity and inclusion". Ilhan Omar was also criticized for a similar tweet.

== See also ==
- 2022 Buffalo shooting, a similar attack which targeted a grocery store
- List of mass shootings in the United States in 2021
- List of shootings in Colorado
