= Colorado Springs Planned Parenthood shooting =

2015 mass shooting in Colorado, U.S.

- Location: 38.8807°N 104.8489°W; Colorado Springs, Colorado, U.S.
- Date: November 27, 2015 c. 11:38 a.m. – 4:52 p.m. (MST)
- Attack type: Mass shooting, shootout, domestic terrorism, anti-abortion violence
- Weapon: SKS Semi-automatic rifle
- Deaths: 3
- Injuries: 9
- Perpetrator: Robert Lewis Dear Jr.
- Motive: Christian extremism, Opposition to abortion

On November 27, 2015, a mass shooting occurred in a Planned Parenthood clinic in Colorado Springs, Colorado, resulting in the deaths of three people and injuries to nine. A police officer and two civilians were killed; five police officers and four civilians were injured. After a standoff that lasted five hours, police SWAT teams crashed armored vehicles into the lobby and the attacker surrendered.

The attacker, Robert Lewis Dear Jr., was arrested, charged in state court with first-degree murder, and ordered held without bond. At court appearances, Dear repeatedly interrupted proceedings, made statements affirming his guilt (although he did not enter a formal plea), and expressed anti-abortion and anti-Planned Parenthood views, calling himself "a warrior for the babies." He also asserted his desire to act as his own attorney in the criminal case against him. Subsequent mental competency evaluations ordered by the state court determined Dear to be delusional. The judge presiding over the state case ruled in May 2016 that Dear was incompetent to stand trial and ordered him indefinitely confined to a Colorado state mental hospital, where he remained until being transferred to federal custody. In 2018, the court ruled that Dear remained incompetent to stand trial. In December 2019, separate federal charges were brought against Dear.

The incident drew comments from the anti-abortion and abortion-rights movements, as well as political leaders. This was the second of two shootings in Colorado Springs in less than a month; the first occurred 28 days earlier.

Dear later died in federal custody on November 22, 2025.

== Event ==
=== Shooting ===
Law enforcement responded to a report of an active shooter inside the Planned Parenthood clinic at approximately 11:38 a.m. MST. Staff inside the clinic said they heard the gunfire outside and then moved people out of the waiting room and locked a security door.

As responding officers approached the building, the suspect fired at them, hitting several and killing one. Police returned fire and a five-hour standoff then ensued. Initial reports described the gunman as being armed with a long gun and wearing hunting gear. Authorities later identified the weapon as a semi-automatic rifle. An eyewitness in the parking lot described a man with a "cold, stone face" as he began firing and pursued a crawling man through the parking lot and into the clinic. Another described a man with "holes in his chest" stagger into a nearby grocery store a few minutes later, saying he had been shot in the parking lot between Planned Parenthood and the store.

As many as twenty gunshots were fired within five minutes. Police swarmed the area, and nearby stores were put on lockdown.

=== Standoff and arrest ===
During the standoff, officers who made it inside the clinic traded fire with the suspect. Police SWAT teams crashed a Bear armored vehicle into the lobby, smashing two sets of doors and rescuing some of those trapped inside. The gunman subsequently surrendered and was taken into custody at 4:52 p.m. Following the apprehension of the gunman, law enforcement began searching the building, as well as the gunman's car, for possible explosives. Multiple propane tanks were found near the suspect's car, and authorities said they believed that he planned to fire on the tanks to trigger an explosion. At 9:10 p.m. the gunman was identified as Robert Lewis Dear Jr., a 57-year-old man from North Carolina.

The Federal Bureau of Investigation and the Bureau of Alcohol, Tobacco, Firearms and Explosives were called to assist in the investigation, and President Barack Obama was briefed on the incident. As a precautionary response to the shooting, additional law enforcement personnel were assigned to Planned Parenthood clinics in New York City and Denver.

== Victims ==
Three individuals were killed in the shooting: University of Colorado Colorado Springs police officer Garrett Swasey, 44, who responded to the shooting; Ke'Arre M. Stewart, 29, who ran back to the clinic to warn others after being shot; and Jennifer Markovsky, 35, who was accompanying a friend to the clinic. Nine other victims—five police officers and four civilians—were shot and admitted to local hospitals.

== Perpetrator ==
Robert Lewis Dear Jr. (April 16, 1958 — November 22, 2025), aged 57 at the time of his arrest, was born in Charleston, South Carolina and grew up in Louisville, Kentucky. While living in Louisville, Dear married his first wife, Kimberly Ann Dear, in December 1979, and had a son. Both were divorced in 1983, with Robert moving back to Charleston afterward.

Dear spent most of his life in the Carolinas, including Charleston (where he lived for most of his Carolina life), Walterboro, South Carolina, Swannanoa, North Carolina, and Black Mountain, North Carolina. He worked as an independent art dealer and lived in a succession of trailers and cabins before moving to Colorado in 2014. He was living in a trailer in Hartsel at the time of the shooting.

In May 1991, Dear was arrested and convicted in Charleston, for the unlawful carrying of a "long blade knife" and illegal possession of a loaded gun. The following year on November 29, 1992, Dear was charged with criminal sexual conduct after allegedly holding a woman at knifepoint and assaulting her at the front door of her apartment after arriving home from her job at the Sears store at the Northwood Mall in North Charleston, but no court records indicate what became of the charge. His second ex-wife, Barbara Mescher Michaux, who was married to Dear from September 1985 to January 1993, told NBC News that Dear had targeted a Planned Parenthood clinic before, by putting glue on its locks, and had a history of violent behavior. In the court document for their 1993 divorce, Mescher Michaux said, "He claims to be a Christian and is extremely evangelistic, but does not follow the Bible in his actions. He says that as long as he believes he will be saved, he can do whatever he pleases. He is obsessed with the world coming to an end." Dear wrote on a marijuana Internet forum: "Turn to JESUS or burn in hell [...] WAKE UP SINNERS U CANT SAVE YOURSELF U WILL DIE AN WORMS SHALL EAT YOUR FLESH, NOW YOUR SOUL IS GOING SOMEWHERE." He also posted notes on the same forum describing his own marijuana usage and stating that he was looking for women to "party" with.

The New York Times also reported that "[a] number of people who knew Mr. Dear said he was a staunch abortion opponent," that "[o]ne person who spoke with him extensively about his religious views said [that] Mr. Dear [...] had praised people who attacked abortion providers, saying they were doing 'God's work,'" and that "[i]n 2009, [...] Mr. Dear described as 'heroes' members of the Army of God, a loosely organized group of anti-abortion extremists that has claimed responsibility for a number of killings and bombings."

Dear's former wife said he was deeply religious, but conflicted, and that he likely targeted the clinic because of its abortion-related activities.

In 2004, his father, Robert Lewis Dear Sr., a World War II navy veteran, died. His mother died in 2022.

Dear died at the United States Medical Center for Federal Prisoners facility in Springfield, Missouri while in police custody at the age of 67 on November 22, 2025, although his passing was not announced until 3 days later. His death came just five days before the tenth anniversary of the shooting. On December 4, 2025, it was revealed that his cause of death was congestive heart failure and "other related medical conditions", such as having too much liquid in his body and too little oxygen in his blood, according to the Federal Bureau of Prisons.

== Investigation ==
Police said on November 29 that the warrants related to the case against Dear have been sealed because the investigation was active, and that consequently information about the timeline of events, the suspect's motive, and the weapon used would not be released "at this time." According to an unnamed senior law enforcement official, first quoted by NBC News, Dear gave a "rambling" interview after his arrest in which he said at one point, "No more baby parts"—a statement that has been seen as a reference to the Planned Parenthood 2015 undercover videos controversy. The unnamed official added that Dear "said a lot of things" in his police interview indicating that the shootings were "definitely politically motivated," and that in the interview Dear had expressed anti-abortion and anti-government views. Dear is also alleged to have made statements about President Barack Obama in the course of events, prompting the U.S. Secret Service to dispatch agents to evaluate the remarks and interview him.

According to an official close to the investigation, Dear asked at least one person for directions to the Planned Parenthood facility before the shooting, which, according to NBC News offered "the clearest suggestion yet that he was targeting the reproductive health organization."

== Legal proceedings ==
=== State charges ===
On November 30, 2015, Dear was charged with first-degree murder and appeared in court (via video from the El Paso County Jail) and was ordered held without bond. If convicted, he would have faced either life in prison or the death penalty (although Colorado abolished the death penalty in 2020, the legislation was not retroactive). Dear was later appointed a public defender: Daniel King, the same attorney who represented James Eagan Holmes, the convicted perpetrator of the 2012 Aurora, Colorado shooting. At the request of prosecutors, the judge ordered the sealing of court documents related to the investigation.

The case was brought in Colorado's Fourth Judicial District before Judge Gilbert Anthony Martinez. Appearing in court on December 9 to be formally charged with 179 felony counts, including first-degree murder, Dear interrupted proceedings more than a dozen times, yelling: "I am guilty, there's no trial. I'm a warrior for the babies," later adding "Protect the babies!" Dear stated "Kill the babies, that's what Planned Parenthood does" and accused his public defenders of conspiring with Planned Parenthood against him. The New York Times reported that Dear's "angry outbursts, declarations of guilt and expressions of anti-abortion politics ... seemed to remove any doubt about his motivation."

At the hearing, Dear also said: "You're not my lawyer" and "I will not meet with him again" and said "I'm not going to agree to mental health evaluations so they can't put me on psychotropic drugs so I can't talk like the Batman guy"—a reference to Holmes.

At a hearing in December 2015, Dear attempted to fire his public defender, telling the court: "I invoke my constitutional right to defend myself." Judge Martinez ordered Dear to undergo a mental competency evaluation at a state mental hospital to determine whether he is sufficiently competent to make the decision to represent himself.

In March 2016, Judge Martinez set a competency hearing for the following month. Dear's counsel requested that the judge send his client to the Colorado Mental Health Institute at Pueblo, the state mental hospital where the evaluation was done. In May 2016, Judge Martinez ruled that Dear was incompetent to stand trial, citing experts' finding that Dear has a "delusional disorder, persecutory type." Martinez ordered Dear to be indefinitely confined to a Colorado state mental hospital. In February 2018, following further evaluations by state psychiatrists, the judge ruled that Dear remained incompetent to stand trial, meaning that the prosecution would remain on hold indefinitely. As of October 2023, Dear was still confined with no trial date. On November 22, 2025, Dear died in federal custody without ever standing trial.

=== Federal charges ===
In early December 2019, a federal grand jury issued a 68-count indictment against Dear: 65 counts of violating the Freedom of Access to Clinic Entrances Act (FACE Act) and three counts of using a firearm to murder. Dear was taken into custody Monday at the Colorado State Mental Health Institute in Pueblo, Colorado, where he has been detained since a state court declared him mentally incompetent to face trial on state charges in May 2016. At a plea hearing, Dear, who has admitted to being the shooter, again made several outbursts, again insisted that he was competent to stand trial, and complained about being held "at the nuthouse for four years." Federal prosecutors requested that Dear undergo a new competency evaluation.

== Reaction ==
Vicki Cowart, president of Planned Parenthood of the Rocky Mountains, decried the incident as a form of domestic terrorism. While the shooting was still ongoing, Republican Representative Adam Kinzinger demanded that Cowart apologize if the perpetrator was not anti-abortion.

U.S. Attorney General Loretta Lynch called the shooting "not only a crime against the Colorado Springs community, but a crime against women receiving healthcare services at Planned Parenthood, law enforcement seeking to protect and serve, and other innocent people." President Barack Obama released a statement on November 28, 2015, that stressed stricter gun control legislation.

Some U.S. politicians and groups described the shooting as domestic terrorism, including Colorado Springs Mayor John Suthers, NARAL Pro-Choice Texas, and former Republican Arkansas governor Mike Huckabee.

Colorado governor John Hickenlooper said the shooting was "a form of terrorism" and said that it and other violent incidents may be the result of the "inflammatory rhetoric we see on all levels"—referring to heated debate over abortion in the U.S.

Vicki Saporta, president of the National Abortion Federation, drew particular attention to the undercover Planned Parenthood videos, two of which were shot at a clinic in Denver, 75 miles north of Colorado Springs; these videos resulted in a number of threats against one doctor featured in the videos.

The FBI issued a statement to law enforcement agencies in September 2015 warning that Planned Parenthood facilities may require protection from arson attacks from "the pro-life extremist movement." After the shooting, some police departments placed emergency response vehicles in the vicinity of Planned Parenthood clinics.

== See also ==
- Anti-abortion violence
- Domestic terrorism in the United States
- List of shootings in Colorado
- List of rampage killers (religious, political, or ethnic crimes)
