= Tracy Quan =

American writer

- Born: August 15, 1977 (age 49); Northeastern U.S.
- Occupations: Novelist, columnist, essayist
- Writing career
- Period: 1999–present
- Subjects: Sex work, prostitution, libertarian feminism, pop culture, politics, relationships
- Movements: Novel: Diary of a Manhattan Call Girl, Diary of a Jetsetting Call Girl, Diary of a Married Call Girl
- Website: www.tracyquan.net

Tracy Quan (born August 15, 1977) is an American writer and former sex worker. She is best known for her Nancy Chan novels. In addition, Quan has written a regular column for The Guardian website on pop culture, sex and politics and is involved in the sex workers' rights movement.

== Biography ==
Quan was born in the Northeastern US, but grew up in Canada. Her parents emigrated to the US from Trinidad; she has spoken of Chinese, Indian, African, and Dutch ancestors. When she was a child her parents divorced and her mother left home. She says her close relationship with her father is partly due to this experience.

Quan read Xaviera Hollander's book The Happy Hooker when she was ten years old and decided to become a prostitute. Her prior aspiration, to be a librarian, was due to her image of librarians as independent, working women who got to collect money in the form of library fines. By the age of 19 she was supporting herself as a sex worker, working at an escort agency and a brothel, before becoming an independent call girl with her own client list. As she told CANOE magazine in 2005, "I was never on the street. I've had a relatively easy time." Quan notes she spent 15 years as a working girl in London and Manhattan, although she juggled both writing and sex work for a few years.

As a writer, Quan first became noticed due to her Nancy Chan: Diary of a Manhattan Call Girl column in Salon.com. Combining sex with a twice-weekly serial, the semi-autobiographical column centered on Nancy as she juggled her 'straight' boyfriend and family with her clients and girlfriends' problems. The story was continued in her novels. Quan expresses the emotional aspects of her life experiences in her novels, her fiction writing, and keeps her journalism for professional commentary on topics of interest: the plight of sex trade workers, changing sexual mores, topical media frenzies on public personalities such as the Eliot Spitzer scandal. Quan is currently a full-time writer, has been a columnist for The Guardian website and is a contributor to The Daily Beast. In 2010, Quan was a semifinalist for the 3 Quarks Daily Politics Prize, judged by Lewis Lapham. She has become a frequent guest on Morning Brew, a Radio 3 RTHK weekday breakfast show hosted by Phil Whelan, commenting on current events and social media.

== Philosophical and/or political views ==
Quan served as a spokeswoman for Prostitutes of New York, or PONY, a sex workers advocacy organization. Quan has been described as a "libertarian entrepreneur", who advocates decriminalization of prostitution in the US. At the same time, she does not encourage others to go into the business.

== Works ==
=== Nancy Chan ===
- Nancy Chan: Diary of a Manhattan Call Girl ran in Salon.com from July 1999-January 2000 as a twice-weekly serial.

working link

- Diary of a Manhattan Call Girl (2001) ISBN 978-0-609-60724-4. Despite name similarity, the events in this novel are set after the Salon series.
- Diary of a Married Call Girl: A Nancy Chan Novel (2005) ISBN 978-1-4000-5354-4
- Diary of a Jetsetting Call Girl (2008) ISBN 978-0-00-724938-1 An adventure in southern France involving the relics of Mary Magdalen

=== Other ===
- Orientalia: Sex in Asia (2003) (With photographer Reagan Louie.) ISBN 978-1-57687-186-7
- Prostitution and Pornography: Philosophical Debate About the Sex Industry Edited by Jessica Spector (2006) ISBN 978-0804749381
