= King Soopers =

Colorado supermarket chain

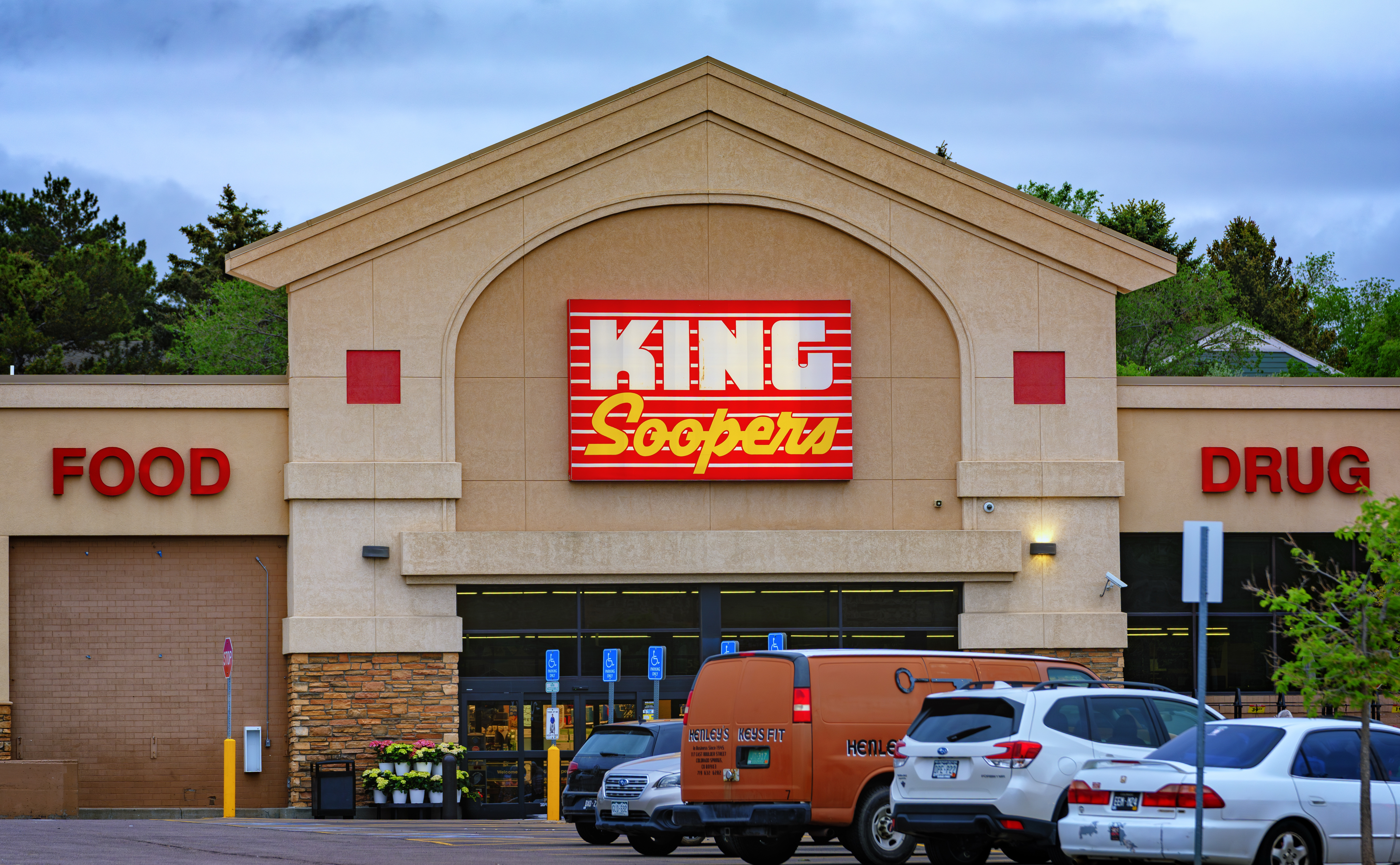
- A King Soopers in Colorado Springs, CO (Store #006-0620)
- Type: Subsidiary
- Industry: Retail / grocery
- Founded: October 1947; 79 years ago in Arvada, Colorado, U.S.
- Founders: Lloyd J. King; Charles W. Houchens
- Headquarters: Denver, Colorado, U.S.
- Number of locations: 120
- Area served: Colorado, Wyoming
- Products: Bakery, dairy, delicatessen, frozen foods, fuel, grocery, lottery, pharmacy, photographic processing, produce, meats, snack food, liquor, flowers, and Western Union
- Services: Supermarket
- Revenue: US$4 billion
- Number of employees: ▲20,000
- Parent: Dillon Companies (1957–1983); Kroger (1983–present)
- Website: kingsoopers.com

King Soopers is an American supermarket chain located in the Rocky Mountains of the United States. It started as its own brand, and is now a subsidiary of Kroger. It is headquartered in Denver, Colorado.

King Soopers has a significant presence in the state of Colorado on the eastern slope of the Rocky Mountains. The stores are located along the Front Range from Cheyenne, Wyoming, to Pueblo, Colorado. There are also a few locations in the foothills west of Denver and Colorado Springs.

== History ==
=== Early history ===
Lloyd J. King opened the first King Soopers with Charles W. Houchens and Robert C. Loury in November 1947 in Arvada, Colorado. Mr. Loury managed the first two stores and then became part of the management team, retiring in 1972. This location has since been demolished for Arvada's Public Library, built in 2005–06.

The name "King Soopers" was derived from Lloyd's family name and an alternate spelling of the word "super!" from the Archie comics series that one of his two sons, Larry, read. Within the next five years, King Soopers became the first grocery store in the country to open an in-store pharmacy and one of the earliest to have a meat department.

=== Ownership changes ===
King Soopers grew to several stores in the Denver metro area and Colorado Springs, before being bought out by Dillon Companies in 1957. The original King Soopers location was relocated from Olde Town Arvada to Arvada Plaza.

King Soopers' then-parent, Dillon Companies, was bought out by The Kroger Company in 1982–83, and King Soopers and Dillon's are both still owned by Kroger today.

=== Fresh Fare King Soopers ===
In 2012, Kroger expanded its Fresh Fare style of supermarkets into the King Soopers brand, opening the first Fresh Fare King Soopers in Englewood, Colorado. This is a concept that first appeared in Kroger as early as 2007 and actually seems to have started with Ralphs, another Kroger subsidiary primarily located in California in 1998.

The main idea of Fresh Fare is to be a bit more upscale in that it sells more organic foods while still selling traditional groceries; it follows the themes of the 'Green Grocer' Concept.

=== King Soopers Marketplace ===
In 2012, the first King Soopers Marketplace opened, just one year after the first Kroger Marketplace in Texas. As of 2017, there are ten King Soopers Marketplace locations all located in Colorado.

The marketplace concept is based on Fred Meyer stores (which have spawned multiple Marketplace stores under other Kroger banners), and features a wider selection of products besides just food and other necessities.

=== Modern day ===
As of June 2025, King Soopers operates 120 locations. All are located in Colorado except for one, located in Cheyenne, Wyoming.

The supermarket in the Table Mesa neighborhood of Boulder was the site of the 2021 Boulder shooting on March 22 of that year.

In October 2022, Kroger and major competitor Albertsons announced a merger agreement. That plan has been challenged in court by several states. Colorado Attorney General Phil Weiser summarized consumer and worker opposition: the merger "would lead to stores closing, higher prices, fewer jobs, worse customer service, and less resilient supply chains.”
