= 2017 Thornton shooting =

Shooting in Colorado, U.S.

Thornton shooting
- Location: 39.876109°N 104.986160°W; Thornton, Colorado, U.S.
- Date: November 1, 2017; 9 years ago c. 6:10 p.m. – (MT; UTC−07:00)
- Target: Walmart Supercenter; 9901 Grant Street; Thornton, Colorado, US
- Attack type: Shooting
- Weapon: Handgun
- Deaths: 3
- Injuries: 0
- Perpetrator: Scott Allen Ostrem

On November 1, 2017, a shooting occurred at a Walmart Supercenter in Thornton, a suburb of Denver, Colorado, United States. It was reported to have begun at 6:10 p.m. MT, resulting in three people killed. There was a nationwide manhunt for suspect Scott Allen Ostrem, 47.

== Shooting ==
Witnesses said he had casually walked into the store and randomly began shooting at people. Ostrem then fled in a red Mitsubishi Mirage. Officer Victor Avila explained that the aftermath of the shooting was "mass chaos," as numerous people rushed out of the store.

Just before 6:30 p.m. MT, Thornton police tweeted there were "multiple parties down" and instructed people to avoid the area. Just before 8:00 a.m. MT, Ostrem was arrested in Westminster near 72nd Avenue and Federal Boulevard, less than 10 miles (16 km) from the location of the shooting. A phone call to police led to his capture.

== Victims ==
Carlos Moreno, 66, of Thornton, Victor Vasquez, 26, of Denver, and Pamela Marques, 52, of Denver were killed in the shooting. Moreno and Vasquez died at the scene, while Marques was transported to a local hospital, where she died. No Walmart employees were injured as a result of the incident.

== Aftermath ==
All three families of the people who were killed have asked for financial assistance online via crowdfunding sites. The Walmart reopened its doors on November 5, 2017. While many shoppers were inside the store, some of them remained outside to give their condolences to the deceased, and to leave messages for the survivors.

== Investigation ==
The motive for the killing is not known. Police spokesman Victor Avila said there is no evidence that the incident was an act of terror, saying "We don't know exactly what the motive of the person was, but it was certainly a terrible act."

== Perpetrator ==
The gunman, Scott Allen Ostrem (born August 3, 1970) of Denver, shot at people using a handgun. Ostrem applied for chapter 7 bankruptcy in September 2015. Scott had an extensive criminal record dating back to 1990, as he was arrested 14 times in total across the Denver area, with six of his arrests dating to the 1990s (four of which were in 1990, one in April 1991, and the other in December 1999). The last time Scott went into custody was in January 2013 for driving under the influence in Wheat Ridge. He accumulated a credit card debt of $58,000. Ostrem lived by himself in a one-bedroom apartment. Neighbors said he cursed at them. He was occasionally seen carrying a rifle bag to and from where he lived. Ostrem never worked at Walmart. The cameras spotted Ostrem leaving Walmart in the same calm manner he had shown when he entered. Ostrem unexpectedly took off from his job as a sheet metal worker at a roofing company hours prior to the incident.

Ostrem's stepsister said he suffered brain damage from taking LSD almost 30 years ago and has heard voices in his head since then. She said his personality quickly changed following a drug party. She said Ostrem did not get treated by any mental health professionals.

== Legal proceedings ==
Ostrem was placed in the Adams County Sheriff's Detention Facility in Brighton, and was set to appear at Adams County District Court at 11 a.m. MT on November 3, 2017. A prosecutor said on November 3, 2017, Ostrem may face multiple charges, in addition to first-degree murder charges resulting from the killings of three people inside Walmart. Adams County District Attorney Dave Young said the additional potential charges are being considered because numerous people were also inside Walmart when Ostrem was shooting inside the store on November 1, 2017. Young did not comment when questioned by reporters regarding a motive for the incident and whether authorities were contemplating hate crime charges, as the three individuals killed were Latino, while Ostrem is white. The courtroom reached its 90-person capacity. At least three people at the court hearing were family members. They declined to talk to reporters following the hearing.

Ostrem was charged with murder and attempted murder on November 6, 2017. District Attorney Dave Young told Denver7 on November 6, 2017, it was too soon to determine if he'd pursue the death penalty, but said he'd talk to the victims' families prior making a decision. A preliminary hearing is scheduled for June 8, 2018, delayed due to a question of whether Ostrem could stand trial. On October 10, 2018, Ostrem pleaded guilty in the shooting. On October 19, 2018, Ostrem was sentenced to three consecutive life sentences plus 48 years in prison.

== Reactions ==
Walmart released a statement that said, "The entire Walmart family is deeply saddened by this tragic event. Our thoughts, prayers and condolences go out to the families who lost loved ones and to all who were impacted by what took place. We are assisting law enforcement however we can and are referring all requests for information to them."
