= 2007 Colorado YWAM and New Life shootings =

Mass shooting

- Location: Arvada and Colorado Springs, Colorado, U.S.
- Date: December 9, 2007 c. 12:30 a.m. – c. 1:00 p.m.
- Target: Youth With a Mission center and New Life Church
- Attack type: Spree shooting, hate crime, anti-Christian violence, mass murder, murder-suicide, mass shooting
- Weapons: YWAM: Springfield Armory 9mm semi-automatic pistol New Life: Bushmaster XM-15 rifle (Chambered to 6.8mm Remington SPC); .40 caliber Beretta Px4 handgun; Springfield Armory handgun; .22 caliber Beretta U22 handgun (unused; left at home)
- Deaths: 5 (including the perpetrator)
- Injuries: 5
- Perpetrator: Matthew John Murray
- Defender: New Life: Jeanne Assam (Former police officer/church member providing security)
- Motive: Anti-Christian sentiment

In the early hours of December 9, 2007, 24-year-old Matthew John Murray opened fire at the Youth With A Mission training center in Arvada, Colorado, killing two and wounding two others before escaping. Later that afternoon, he attacked the New Life Church in Colorado Springs, Colorado, with a number of firearms, killing two more people and injuring three before being shot by Jeanne Assam, a member of the church's safety team. Murray then committed suicide by shooting himself in the head.

== Shootings ==
=== Arvada missionary shooting ===
Around 12:30 a.m. MST (07:30 UTC), following a Christmas banquet that had taken place earlier that night, Murray knocked on the door of the Youth With A Mission facility. Murray asked personnel in the youth center if he could stay overnight; when he was refused, Murray opened fire with a 9mm handgun, killing Tiffany Johnson, the center's Director of Hospitality, and staff member Philip Crouse, as well as wounding Dan Griebenow in the neck and Charlie Blanch in the leg.

After the incident, the YWAM base evacuated its 80 people to the mountain campus in Black Hawk, 45 of whom were in the building at the time of the shooting. Local police quickly conducted a canine search of the surrounding area, searching for the shooter; they hoped that fresh snow would help them track the suspect, but were unable to locate him. A reverse 911 call went out to residents of the neighborhood to let them know an active shooter might be in their area.

=== New Life Church shooting ===
At around 1:00 p.m. MST, Murray opened fire in the New Life Church parking lot with a Bushmaster XM-15 rifle, shooting at the Works family as they entered their vehicle. He killed 18-year-old Stephanie Works and 16-year-old Rachel Works before critically wounding their father, David Works, by shooting him multiple times.

Church member and bystander Judy Purcell was wounded in the shoulder when attempting to enter her vehicle; she survived her injuries. Murray directed gunfire towards other vehicles within the church parking lot, including narrowly missing church patron Christina Wilke after striking her vehicle with bullets from his semi-automatic rifle, missing Wilke by approximately four inches. Murray then entered the building's main foyer where he wounded Larry Bourbonnais, as Bourbonnais was attempting to yell at Murray to distract Murray from hurting others. Bourbonnais was lightly wounded in the forearm with shrapnel.

At this point, church member Jeanne Assam, a New Life Church security volunteer, who was herself a former Minneapolis Police Department law enforcement officer, opened fire upon Murray. Assam shot Murray 10 times, striking him in both the femoral and carotid arteries using her Beretta 92FS handgun. The incident was fully witnessed by Larry Bourbonnais, who later repeatedly conveyed to national news interests that, "It was the bravest thing I've ever seen." Assam later publicly acknowledged that she had asked God to be with her as she took on the active shooter. Murray then fatally shot himself in the head with the same handgun he used in the YWAM shooting. He fired a total of 42 rounds during the entire shooting spree; 15 at YWAM and 27 at New Life Church, including the self-inflicted shot.

== Aftermath ==
After the New Life Church shooting, Assam later stated that "God guided me and protected me [and I] did not think for a minute to run away" when a reporter asked her if she had.

On December 13, 2007, Murray's family issued a statement saying that it was "groping for answers" and issued an apology.

The pastor of the church stated that Assam shot Murray before he entered 50 feet (15 m) inside the building, after she encountered him in the hallway, and that Assam probably saved "over 100 lives."

Following the shooting spree, Colorado Springs Police Department officers searched the church campus looking for suspicious devices. Colorado governor Bill Ritter ordered state authorities to help investigate. The FBI and the Bureau of Alcohol, Tobacco, Firearms and Explosives also came to the site to assist.

It was not immediately known whether the shootings were related to an earlier Arvada missionary shooting, 70 miles (110 km) away. Prior to the second shooting, police were already conducting an investigation at Murray's home.

Police said the description of the gunman in the second shooting was similar to the first: a white male wearing a dark hat and dark jacket.

== Victims ==
Name	Age	Location	Status
Tiffany Johnson	26	Youth With a Mission center	killed
Philip Crouse	24	Youth With a Mission center	killed
Dan Griebenow	24	Youth With a Mission center	wounded
Charlie Blanch	22	Youth With a Mission center	wounded
Stephanie Works	18	New Life Church	killed
Rachel Works	16	New Life Church	killed
David Works	51	New Life Church	wounded
Judy Purcell	40	New Life Church	wounded
Larry Bourbonnais	59	New Life Church	wounded

== Perpetrator ==
Matthew John Murray, a 24-year-old resident of Englewood, Colorado, was identified as the perpetrator of both shootings. Born On December 5, 1983 in Salt Lake City, Utah to Ronald and Loretta Murray, Murray was homeschooled in a deeply religious Christian household after the 1st grade, and he attended, but did not complete, a missionary training program at the YWAM Arvada facility 2002. He was expelled from the school due to "strange behavior," which included playing perceived-frightening rock music and him claiming to hear voices.

Court records indicated that Murray was bitter over his expulsion from the 12-week missionary training program, as he was consequently banned from attending a field trip to Bosnia. His expulsion from the school was confirmed by Cheryl Morrison, whose husband, George Morrison, is pastor of the Faith Bible Chapel adjacent to YWAM Denver. She didn't know specifics of the conflict. "I don't think that 'run-in' is the word, but they did have to dismiss him. It had to be something of significance, because they go the nth degree with people."

Before the second shooting, Murray left several violent and threatening messages on several religious websites, espousing his hatred for fundamental Christianity and his intentions on killing as many Christians as possible. One message quoted Eric Harris, one of the perpetrators of the Columbine High School massacre, adding to it "especially Christians who are to blame for most of the problems in the world." In his online postings, Murray alleges psychological abuse at the hands of his parents and church leaders as the main reason for his hatred of Christianity.

Murray was obsessed with several school shootings and mass shootings. Additionally, hundreds of images of pornography and child pornography were found on his computer by investigators. Before the shooting at New Life, Murray called a family member and confessed to his obsession with mass shootings.

In the months before the shootings, Murray acquired several weapons: an AK-47 semi-automatic variant, a Beretta .22-caliber handgun, a Beretta .40-caliber handgun, a Springfield Armory 9mm handgun, and a Bushmaster XM-15 .223-caliber rifle, which he had modified to fire a larger caliber round. He was found to have had over 3,000 rounds of ammunition at New Life and had over 1,000 more at his home in Englewood.

In another of his very last posts, made that morning to a Usenet newsgroup, he identified himself as being a member of a local branch of Ordo Templi Orientis. According to the chapter leader, Murray had attended their events for one or two years, but his request for membership was turned down and he was asked to leave in either September or October.

Murray was involved in several religious organizations in the Denver area, including: His Love Fellowship Church, Prince of Peace Church of the Brethren, Trinity Christian, Ordo Templi Orientis, and the New Life Church. He was also baptized into the Church of Jesus Christ of Latter-day Saints (LDS Church) in late 2006, according to the church's records.

Murray was diagnosed with ADHD at the age of four or five, and he had begun taking Ritalin at age five. According to investigators, he descended into extreme anti-Christian psychosis over a period of several months, and his web-postings became increasingly violent, despondent and hateful. Some of the users tried to counsel Murray. After the killing, police found a letter addressed "To God," by Murray, in his car, which was later obtained by Newsradio 850 KOA. The letter was found along with two books: I Had to Say Something by Mike Jones and Serial Murderers and Their Victims by Eric W. Hickey, according to the invoice.

Murray was buried during a private funeral service for close friends and family soon after the shooting.

== See also ==
- Anti-Christian sentiment
