= List of attacks against places of worship in the United States =

This is a list of notable attacks against places of worship in the United States.

Only events with at least one killed or injured will be listed.

Date	Location	Dead	Injured	Total	Motive	Description	Denomination
August 10, 1884	Lewis County, Tennessee	5 (Note: Including one of the perpetrators)	0	5	Anti-Mormon sentiment	Cane Creek Massacre	Church of Jesus Christ of Latter-day Saints
September 15, 1963	Birmingham, Alabama	4	14-22	18-26	Ku Klux Klan attack during the Civil rights movement	16th Street Baptist Church bombing	Baptist Christianity
June 22, 1980	Daingerfield, Texas	5	11 (Note: Including the perpetrator)	16	Dispute	Daingerfield church shooting	Baptist Christianity
August 9–10, 1991	Waddell, Arizona	9	0	9	Robbery	Waddell Buddhist temple shooting	Buddhism
December 30, 1997	Oakwood, Illinois	1	0	1	Unknown	Part of the Vermilion County, Illinois bombings. A church member was killed investigating a pipe bomb left in a cooler.	United Methodist Church
May 24, 1998	Danville, Illinois	0	34	34	Unknown	Part of the Vermilion County, Illinois bombings. A pipe bomb was placed on top of a HVAC unit while 300 people attended service. A member of the church was later identified as the bomber and committed suicide when confronted by police.	Assemblies of God
April 15, 1999	Salt Lake City, Utah	3	5	8	Unknown	FamilySearch Library 1999 shooting: A 70-year-old man entered the Family search Library and opened fire, killing a security officer and female patron and injuring five others (all women). After a ninety-five minute standoff, Salt Lake City Police took down the gunman.	Church of Jesus Christ of Latter-day Saints
September 15, 1999	Fort Worth, Texas	8	7	15	Anti-Christian sentiment	Wedgwood Baptist Church shooting: A man opened fire during a youth service at a church.	Baptist Christianity
April 10, 2000	Powell, Wyoming	0	1 (Note: the perpetrator)	1	Resentment of LDS doctrine	Perpetrator rammed his pickup truck into an LDS meetinghouse.	Church of Jesus Christ of Latter-day Saints
June 10, 2002	Conception, Missouri	3	2	5	Resentment of Roman Catholics	Conception Abbey shooting: A 71-year-old man opened fire inside an abbey before committing suicide.	Roman Catholic
March 12, 2005	Brookfield, Wisconsin	8	4	12	Anti-Christian sentiment	2005 Living Church of God shooting: A congregant opened fire at a church service before killing himself.	Living Church of God
May 21, 2006	Baton Rouge, Louisiana	5	1	6	Domestic dispute	2006 Baton Rouge church shooting: A man targeting his estranged wife and her relatives opened fire at a church before kidnapping his wife and killing her.	Christian
August 12, 2007	Neosho, Missouri	3	5	8	Unclear, targeted church leaders	Neosho, Missouri church shooting: A man upset with church leaders shot at senior congregation members during a service.	Christian
December 9, 2007	Arvada and Colorado Springs, Colorado	5	5	10	Anti-Christian sentiment	2007 Colorado YWAM and New Life shootings	Youth With A Mission, Non-denominational
July 27, 2008	Knoxville, Tennessee	2	6	8	Anti-liberal sentiment	Knoxville Unitarian Universalist church shooting	Unitarian Universalism
May 31, 2009	Wichita, Kansas	1	0	1	Assassination by anti-abortion extremists	Murder of George Tiller while he was attending Reformation Lutheran Church	Evangelical Lutheran Church in America
August 29, 2010	Visalia, California	1	0	1	Unknown	A gunman entered a LDS meetinghouse and killed the bishop.	Church of Jesus Christ of Latter-day Saints
August 5, 2012	Oak Creek, Wisconsin	8	3	11	White supremacy	Wisconsin Sikh temple shooting	Sikhism
June 17, 2015	Charleston, South Carolina	9	1	10	White supremacy	Charleston church shooting	African Methodist Episcopal Church
September 24, 2017	Antioch, Tennessee	1	8	9	Black supremacy	Burnette Chapel shooting	Christian
November 5, 2017	Sutherland Springs, Texas	27 (Note: Including an unborn baby)	22	49	Disputed	Sutherland Springs church shooting	Southern Baptist Convention
July 22, 2018	Fallon, Nevada	1	1	2	Unknown	A gunman entered an LDS meetinghouse and shot into the congregation, killing one and injuring another.	Church of Jesus Christ of Latter-day Saints
October 27, 2018	Pittsburgh, Pennsylvania	11	6	17	Antisemitism	Pittsburgh synagogue shooting	Conservative Judaism
April 27, 2019	Poway, California	1	3	4	Antisemitism	Poway synagogue shooting	Orthodox Judaism
December 29, 2019	White Settlement, Texas	3	0	3	Unknown	West Freeway Church of Christ shooting	Christian
January 15, 2022	Colleyville, Texas	1 (Note: Including the perpetrator or suspect)	4	5	Release of Aafia Siddiqui from prison	Colleyville synagogue hostage crisis	Judaism
February 28, 2022	Sacramento, California	5	1	6	Domestic dispute	David Fidel Mora-Rojas shot and killed his three children, a chaperone, and himself during a supervised visit at The Church in Sacramento.	Non-denominational
May 15, 2022	Laguna Woods, California	1	5	6	Anti-Taiwanese sentiment	2022 Laguna Woods church shooting:	Presbyterian
June 16, 2022	Vestavia Hills, Alabama	3	1	4	Unknown	Vestavia Hills church shooting: During a potluck meeting at St. Stephen's Episcopal Church, 71-year-old Robert Frindlay Smith opened fire, killing three people before being subdued.	Episcopal
March 27, 2023	Nashville, Tennessee	7	1	8	Infamy, anti-Christian sentiment	2023 Nashville school shooting: A former student, identified as 28-year-old Aiden Hale, opened fire inside the Covenant School killing six people, including three children. Two others were injured (one by gunfire). During the shooting, Hale fired seven shots into one of the cathedral's stained glass windows depicting Adam and Eve. Hale was killed by responding police officers. Investigators determined that the perpetrator targeted the school because it was Christian.	Presbyterian Church in America
January 3, 2024	Newark, New Jersey	1	0	1	Unknown	An imam, Hassan Sharif, was shot and killed in his vehicle outside the Masjid Muhammad Mosque. Authorities stated that they did not think the shooting was a hate crime.	Islam
February 11, 2024	Houston, Texas	1	2	3	Under investigation	Lakewood Church shooting: 36-year-old Genesse Moreno fired 30 shots inside Lakewood Church during Spanish-language services, injuring two people. She was killed by church security guards.	Word of Faith
March 27, 2024	Henderson, Nevada	0	4	4	Entertainment	Three people attacked an LDS meetinghouse with an explosive.	Church of Jesus Christ of Latter-day Saints
December 16, 2024	Madison, Wisconsin	3	6	9	Under investigation	Abundant Life Christian School shooting: A 15-year-old student opened fire inside a second-floor classroom inside the Abundant Life Christian School, killing two people and injuring six others, before killing herself. The school was part on the campus of the Abundant Life Church.	Protestant
June 22, 2025	Wayne, Michigan	1	1	2	Under investigation	Wayne, Michigan church shooting: A heavily armed man tried to burst into a Sunday morning service at CrossPointe Community Church in Wayne. He was confronted by church security who shot him dead.	Non-denominational
July 13, 2025	Lexington, Kentucky	3	2	5	Under investigation	2025 Lexington shootings: Two women at Richmond Road Baptist Church were killed by a suspect who was looking for his ex-wife; he also shot and wounded two other people. The perpetrator was killed by police.	Baptist
August 27, 2025	Minneapolis, Minnesota	3	29	32	Under investigation, possibly anti-Catholic sentiment	Annunciation Catholic Church shooting: A man with a rifle shot and killed two children and injured 29 other people during an all-school Mass for the church's PreK-8 school. The perpetrator killed himself at the scene. The shooting is being investigated as an anti-Catholic hate crime.	Roman Catholic
September 28, 2025	Grand Blanc Township, Michigan	5	8	13	Under investigation, possibly anti-Mormon sentiment	Grand Blanc Township church attack: A veteran rammed a truck into a Latter-day Saint church, then shot at congregants and set the building on fire. He was killed during a shootout with police.	Church of Jesus Christ of Latter-day Saints
January 7, 2026	Salt Lake City, Utah	2	6	8	Domestic dispute	An altercation outside a Mormon meetinghouse during a funeral escalated into a shooting that killed two people and left six others injured, resulting in a manhunt for the suspect or suspects.	
March 12, 2026	West Bloomfield Township, Michigan	1 (Note: Including the perpetrator or suspect)	64	65	Retaliation for his niece, nephew, and two brothers getting killed by Israeli strikes in Lebanon	Temple Israel synagogue attack: A man rammed his vehicle into the building and opened fire. The vehicle caught fire, possibly from something flammable inside, and severely burned the suspect's body. One security guard was struck and injured by the vehicle, while at least 63 law enforcement officers were transported to hospitals to be treated for smoke inhalation.	Reform Judaism
May 18, 2026	San Diego, California	5 (Note: Including the perpetrators or suspects)	0	5	Anti-Islam sentiment White supremacy Neo-Nazi accelerationism Nihilistic violent extremism	2026 Islamic Center of San Diego shooting	Sunni Islam

== See also ==
- List of attacks against African-American churches
- List of attacks on Jewish institutions
- List of attacks against Latter-day Saint churches
- List of cases of church arson
- List of mass shootings in the United States
