= Texas church shooting =

Texas church shooting may refer to:

- Daingerfield church shooting, which occurred in 1980
- Wedgwood Baptist Church shooting, which occurred in 1999
- Sutherland Springs church shooting, which occurred in 2017
- West Freeway Church of Christ shooting, which occurred in 2019
- Lakewood Church shooting, which occurred in 2024

== See also ==
- List of shootings in Texas
