= List of shootings in Texas =

This is a list of shootings in Texas resulted in death. This list contains notable homicides committed with firearms and alike within the U.S. state of Texas that have a Wikipedia article for the killing, the killer, or a related subject.

Incident	Location	Date	Deaths	Description
Assassination of John F. Kennedy	Dallas	November 22, 1963	2	While traveling in an open car, President John F. Kennedy was killed by a lone sniper, Lee Harvey Oswald, who then murdered J. D. Tippit, a Dallas police officer who had spotted him in a local neighborhood.
Jack Ruby Shoots Lee Harvey Oswald	Dallas	November 24, 1963	1	As Oswald was being escorted by police through the Dallas Police Headquarters basement to a waiting armored car that was to take him to the county jail, he was fatally shot in the abdomen, at close range, by Dallas nightclub operator Jack Ruby. The shooting was broadcast live on network television.
University of Texas tower shooting	Austin	August 1, 1966	18	A student, sniper, Charles Whitman, barricaded himself atop a campus tower, shooting at the people down below before being shot by Austin police officers.
San Antonio parade shooting	San Antonio	April 27, 1979	3	64-year-old Ira Attebury opened fire on the spectator crowd at the Battle of Flowers parade in San Antonio.
Daingerfield church shooting	Daingerfield	June 22, 1980	5	Religious hate crime
Grand Prairie shooting	Grand Prairie	August 9, 1982	6	Workplace violence
1984 Dallas nightclub shooting	Dallas	June 29, 1984	6	Mass shooting
Luby's shooting	Killeen	October 16, 1991	24	Inconclusive (predominant theory is misogyny but others include misanthropy, rejection and isolation)
Waco siege	Axtell	February 28, 1993	10	Suspected weapons violations by religious cult, botched police warrant search
Murder of Selena	Corpus Christi	March 31, 1995	1	Entertainer murdered by her fan club president
Corpus Christi shooting	Corpus Christi	April 3, 1995	6	Workplace violence
Wedgwood Baptist Church shooting	Fort Worth	September 15, 1999	8	Religious hate crime
2007 NASA Johnson Space Center	Houston	April 20, 2007	2	Workplace violence triggered by unsatisfactory job review. Hostage taking, with eventual suicide by perpetrator
2009 Fort Hood shooting	Fort Hood	November 5, 2009	14	Terrorist attack perpetrated by on-base US Army major
University of Texas Library shooting	Austin	September 28, 2010	1	A student, Colton Tooley, fired shots from an AK-47 before killing himself in the Perry–Castañeda Library.
2012 College Station shooting	College Station	August 13, 2012	3	Shootout with the police, when served with a summons to appear in court over unpaid back rent
2014 Fort Hood shootings	Fort Hood	April 2, 2014	4	Workplace violence
2014 Harris County shooting	Spring	July 9, 2014	6	Domestic violence
Curtis Culwell Center attack	Garland	May 3, 2015	2	Two attackers were the only fatalities
2015 Waco shootout	Waco	May 17, 2015	9	Large, confused shootout with Bandidos, Cossacks, and allies
2015 attack on Dallas police	Dallas/Hutchins	June 13, 2015	1	Attack on police headquarters, followed by a chase that resulted in the attacker being killed.
2015 Harris County shooting	near Houston	August 8, 2015	8	Domestic violence
2016 shooting of Dallas police officers	Dallas	July 7, 2016	6	A single attacker ambushed a group of policemen.
2017 Plano shooting	Plano	September 10, 2017	9	Domestic violence
Sutherland Springs church shooting	Sutherland Springs	November 5, 2017	27	Deadliest mass shooting in Texas history. Deadliest shooting in an American place of worship in modern history.
2018 Santa Fe High School shooting	Santa Fe	May 18, 2018	10	School shooting
2019 El Paso Walmart shooting	El Paso	August 3, 2019	23	Mass shooting inside a Walmart and its surrounding area. The shooter, 21-year-old Patrick Crusius, was arrested by the police. 22 others were injured.
Midland–Odessa shootings	Odessa and Midland	August 31, 2019	8	Spree shooting at multiple locations in the Midland–Odessa area
West Freeway Church of Christ shooting	White Settlement	December 29, 2019	3	Gunman opened fire during Sunday morning church service, killing two, before being killed by an armed member of the congregation.
2021 Garland shooting	Garland	December 26, 2021	3	A mass shooting took place at a Texaco convenience store in Garland, Texas, United States. Three teenage boys were killed and another was seriously injured before the perpetrator, 14-year-old Abel Acosta, fled the scene
Robb Elementary School shooting	Uvalde	May 24, 2022	22	A gunman shot his grandmother at their home, then drove to an elementary school and opened fire, killing 21 people, before being killed by police.
2023 Cleveland, Texas shooting	Cleveland	April 28, 2023	5	A gunman shot neighbors, killing 5 people, before fleeing into a wooded area.
2023 Allen, Texas outlet mall shooting	Allen	May 6, 2023	9	A gunman shot and killed eight people before being shot by police.
2023 Austin shootings	Austin	December 4–5, 2023	6	A gunman killed six people in a spree shooting before being arrested.
2026 Austin bar shooting	Austin	March 1, 2026	4	A gunman shot 18 people, killing three, before being killed by police.

- April 2024, Bowie High School, Arlington Texas https://www.wfaa.com/article/news/local/tarrant-county/bowie-high-school-shooting-julian-howard-sentence-guilty-plea/287-67d71ee1-3d4f-4789-ad33-fd335538219e
- March 2023 Lamar High School, Arlington Texas https://www.keranews.org/criminal-justice/2023-09-21/lamar-high-school-shooter-sentenced-murder-arlington
- October 2021 Timberview High School, Arlington Texas https://www.keranews.org/criminal-justice/2024-05-16/timberview-high-school-shooting-arlington-mansfield-isd-new-assault-charges

== See also ==
- Crime in Texas
