= Harris County shooting =

Harris County shooting may refer to:

- 2014 Harris County shooting, a shooting near Spring, Texas
- 2015 Harris County shooting, a shooting near Houston, Texas
