= List of killings by law enforcement officers in the United States, February 2024 =

This is a list of people reported killed by non-military law enforcement officers in the United States in February 2024, whether in the line of duty or not, and regardless of reason or method. The listing documents the occurrence of a death, making no implications regarding wrongdoing or justification on the part of the person killed or officer involved. Killings are arranged by date of the incident that caused death. Different death dates, if known, are noted in the description. The table below lists 92 people.

== February 2024 ==
Date	Name (age) of deceased	Race	Location	Description
2024-02-29	Ricardo Ivan Balboa Aguilar (36)	Hispanic	Houston, Texas	
2024-02-29	Kristin Dock (32)	Black	Lakewood, Colorado	During a traffic stop, Dock and a female passenger exited the vehicle. Dock then began shooting at police who returned fire, killing him on scene.
2024-02-27	Shawn Karr (42)	White	Groveland, California	During a traffic stop, Karr exited the vehicle and ran, with a Tuolumne County Sheriff's deputy giving chase. During the foot pursuit, Karr allegedly took out a firearm, and the deputy shot Karr.
2024-02-26	Marcus Allen Camacho (36)	Hispanic	Fontana, California	Fontana Police officers fatally shot Camacho sometime after he armed himself with an "edged weapon" inside a Home Depot. Before entering the store, Camacho was allegedly acting "erratic" and trying to intentionally get struck by a vehicle.
2024-02-26	Austin Flores (43)	Hispanic	Huntsville, Texas	Flores died after he allegedly pulled out a gun at Huntsville police officers at a Motel 6 motel. Flores was wanted for failing to comply as a sex offender.
2024-02-26	William Pickett (54)	White	Sarasota, Florida	Pickett, who was a suspect in a bank robbery, died after he was fatally shot by a Sarasota Police officer during a traffic stop.
2024-02-26	Anthony Joseph Stratmann Jr (37)	White	Festus, Missouri	Stratmann was fatally shot by three Jefferson County Sheriff's Office deputies when he allegedly advanced towards them with a hammer.
2024-02-24	Trayvon Little (37)	Black	Lexington, Illinois	Illinois State Police officers responding to a "shots fired" call on I-55 encounter two vehicles on the shoulder. Little allegedly was shooting at one of the vehicles before he turned the gun towards troopers. The troopers then shot and killed Little.
2024-02-24	Devon Lewis (23)	White	Tucson, Arizona	Lewis, who was allegedly armed with a sword, died after being shot and killed by Pima County Sheriff's deputy outside a Days Inn hotel.
2024-02-24	Randy Herring (58)	White	Gastonia, North Carolina	
2024-02-24	Cesar Martha (50)	Hispanic	Fontana, California	Martha died after being fatally shot by San Bernardino County Sheriff's deputies.
2024-02-24	Edward Holmes (58)	Black	Buffalo, New York	After Baffalo Police officers responded to a report of a man with a gun, arrival officers encountered Edward Holmes with a shotgun. Holmes allegedly discharged the shotgun and was being fatally shot. It was later determinded that Holmes placed the 911 call.
2024-02-24	James H. Kreisel (28)	White	Sedalia, Missouri	Kreisel, who was allegedly armed with a knife, died after being shot by a Sedalia Police officer during a physical altercation. During the altercation, two officers were injured.
2024-02-23	Kelvin Gerard Jackson (34)	Black	Rome, Georgia	After allegedly robbing a Citgo gas station, Jackson was fatally shot by a Rome Police officer during unknown circumstances.
2024-02-23	Michael Lee Hanson (69)	White	Great Falls, Montana	After receiving information that Hanson's girlfriend was engaging in animal cruelty police searched her home. During the search Hanson fired at a deputy, injuring his shoulder. The deputy returned fire, killing Hanson.
2024-02-23	Payden Sells (34)	White	York County, Pennsylvania	Officers responded to a call about a domestic dispute involving firearms at Sells residence. Upon arrival, Sells exited the home and began firing at officers. They returned fire, killing him.
2024-02-23	Steve Evaristo Ventura (40)	Unknown	Green Bay, Wisconsin	Ventura died after being shot during a shootout with a Green Bay police officer.
2024-02-23	Joseph Westley Henson (30)	White	Pearblossom, California	After responding to a call about an assault, a Los Angeles County deputy fatally shot Henson at a Shell gas station. He was allegedly armed with a "sharp object".
2024-02-22	Clyde E. Young (28)	White	West Alton, Missouri	Police receive a 911 call from Young stating his girlfriend was shot and in a truck. Upon arrival, he was nowhere to be found and his girlfriend had succumbed to her injuries. Later, in a stand off with police he was killed.
2024-02-22	Colin Jennings (26)	Black	Columbus, Ohio	A Columbus police officer fatally shot Jennings as he continuously approaching officers with a knife in his hand.
2024-02-22	unidentified male (25)	White	Lenoir, North Carolina	A man was shot after raising a gun toward Caldwell County deputies.
2024-02-22	Sief Bani-Khalid (32)	White	Independence, Missouri	Residents called to report a man firing off his gun in front of a home. When police arrived, they ordered him to drop his weapon and he did not comply. Officers fired shots, killing him. Upon further examination, it was revealed he was wearing a fanny pack full of ammunition at the time of his death.
2024-02-22	Valentin Benavides IV	Unknown	Altus, Oklahoma	A man was found wandering bleeding and wielding a knife. When police offered him aid, he attempted to attack them with the knife. The officer then shot him.
2024-02-22	Joshua Patrick (36)	White	Rose Hill, North Carolina	A sheriff's deputy responding to a domestic violence call struck Patrick's vehicle as he made a left turn as the deputy attempted to pass him.
2024-02-21	Jamarcus Brown (35-38? (Note: Some sources, such as Actionnews5, say Brown was 38. But Fox 13 Memphis states Brown was 35.))	Black	Walls, Mississippi	Brown was involved in a vehicle pursuit on Highway 61. At some point Brown vehicle was initiated a PIT maneuver, causing Brown's vehicle to come to a stop. DeSoto County Deputies then released a K9, which Brown shot and killed. Brown was then shot by the deputies.
2024-02-21	John Daniels (37)	Unknown	Ladson, South Carolina	After a vehicle chase resulting in a crash, a shoot out between Daniels and an officer occurs. Daniels is killed during the shoot out.
2024-02-21	Laison Crenshaw (37)	Hispanic	Austin, Texas	After struggling with mental illness, Crenshaw agreed to voluntarily admit himself into the hospital. During his time there, he had an altercation with a security officer and was arrested. He was put in handcuffs and then he 'stopped breathing'.
2024-02-20	unidentified female	Unknown	Orlando, Florida	
2024-02-20	Jonathan Gale (53)	White	Brush Prairie, Washington	Jonathon Gale was shot by Clark County Sheriff's deputies after allegedly reaching for his firearms. police later found multiple firearms and over 1000 ammunition in his vehicle.
2024-02-20	Jose Luis Saenz (41)	Hispanic	Las Vegas, Nevada	Saenz was shot after approaching Las Vegas police officers with a long piece of metal.
2024-02-20	Lucas Barros (42)	Hispanic	Los Lunas, New Mexico	Barros had an altercation with his wife, when the police arrived, he released the child with him and then walked back and pointed a gun at officers. At least one officer discharged their weapons striking him.
2024-02-19	Miguel Godines (37)	Hispanic	Phoenix, Arizona	Godines was shot and killed after trying to carjack a vehicle at gunpoint and attempting to run toward a vehicle while armed.
2024-02-18	Brett Smiley (43)	White	Shawnee, Kansas	Smiley was fatally shot by Shawnee police officers after an armed robbery.
2024-02-18	Wendall Cross (85)	White	Union County, Georgia	Officers responded to a domestic dispute with a firearm at Cross' home, he came out with a firearm in hand, pointing it at officers. After ignoring their commands to drop his weapon, he was shot.
2024-02-17	Torraize Armstrong (40)	Black	Chester, Pennsylvania	Armstrong was involved in a driveway shooting earlier that morning, when police spotted his car they attempted to pull him over. After a chase, Armstrong crashed his car and got out of the vehicle firing at police. They returned fire and he died.
2024-02-17	Jose Flores (63)	Hispanic	Tupelo, Mississippi	Flores was the suspect in a domestic violence incident, threatening the victim with a gun, that officers responded to at the residence. Flores ran into nearby woods and a chase began. Once found, he began firing at officers who returned fire.
2024-02-17	Jeffrey Moss (51)	White	Wichita, Kansas	A 29-year-old officers struck Moss as he was crossing the street on foot.
2024-02-17	Taiquell Woodson (33)	Black	Islip, New York	Woodson's wife contacted law enforcement after her husband had been acting violently. When Woodson answered the door he was holding a large knife and immediately begins stabbing the officer. The officer being attacked attempted to use his taser but Woodson remained undeterred. The other officer shot him.
2024-02-17	Trent Prince (26)	White	Linwood, North Carolina	Officers attempted to arrest Prince on an outstanding warrant and resulted in a shoot out.
2024-02-17	Jeremy Bradsher (45)	White	Silver Springs, Florida	A report was made about a battery strangulation suspect, Bradsher, at a residence. When police responded, he opened fire injuring the K-9 dog. A shoot out began and killed Bradsher.
2024-02-15	Curtis Wallace (36)	Black	Philadelphia, Pennsylvania	Wallace was shot and killed after he allegedly drove into a Philadelphia officer and pinned him against a wall.
2024-02-15	Dario Agudelo (29)	Hispanic	Battle Creek, Michigan	Agudelo shot a female officer during an altercation in the leg and failed to comply when the responding officer arrived.
2024-02-14	William Lowery (46)	Unknown	Sheridan, Wyoming	Lowery was wanted after shooting and killing an officer shortly before a stand-off outside his home with officers. He barricaded himself inside. After 24 hours, he exited the home with a weapon and attempted to flee.
2024-02-14	Tabitha "Tabby" Smith Colbaugh (35)	White	Birchwood, Tennessee	Colbaugh, who was in the back seat of Deputy Sheriff Leonard's patrol car, drowned after Leonard drove the car into the Tennessee River. Leonard also died in the incident.
2024-02-13	Marvin Martin III (50)	White	Chillicothe, Illinois	Martin exchanged gunfire with an officer during a traffic stop, shooting the officer non-fatally.
2024-02-13	Philip Austin Brant (26)	White	Manassas, Virginia	At a training center inside a classroom, Brant pulls a knife from his backpack and begins stabbing a man. He then goes to another room to stab someone else. One died and one in critical condition. When officers responded, he was instructed to drop the knife. Instead, he began walking towards them and was shot.
2024-02-12	Oscar Venegas (35)	Hispanic	Spokane, Washington	
2024-02-12	Erick Cid (50)	Black	Spokane, Washington	A woman called 911 to report Cid was threatening to shoot her and while on the phone gunshots were heard, she had been shot. When police responded, gunfire was exchanged and Cid was killed.
2024-02-12	Kassandra Lozano (25)	Hispanic	Laredo, Texas	An off-duty sheriff's deputy allegedly caused a fatal car wreck due to driving while intoxicated. The woman who died was a passenger in the private car he was driving. The officer was charged with manslaughter.
2024-02-12	Geoffrey Parirchet (26)	Black	New York City, New York	NYPD officers received reports of a domestic dispute in Edgemere. When they arrived, Parirchet allegedly pointed a fake gun at officers, causing them to fatally shoot him.
2024-02-12	Mario Bonilla (55)	Hispanic	Weston, Florida	After responding to a call about a possible suspicious man, deputies encountered Bonilla in a vehicle. He exited the vehicle with a weapon and refused to drop it. He then charged at the deputies resulting one of the deputies discharged his service weapon fatally striking him.
2024-02-12	Gregg A. Marcotte (44)	White	Shullsburg, Wisconsin	Police were called because of a man acting erratically in public. They attempted to deploy non-lethal means to get him to comply. He died in custody.
2024-02-11	Genesse Ivonne Moreno (36)	Hispanic	Houston, Texas	A woman entered Lakewood Church with a child shortly before a service was set to begin and opened fire with a rifle. The child and a 57-year-old man were injured by gunfire. Two off-duty officers, one with the Houston Police Department and the other with the Texas Alcoholic Beverage Commission, shot and killed the woman.
2024-02-11	Pedro Armendariz (45)	Hispanic	Amarillo, Texas	Police responded to a report of domestic disturbance at the Armendariz residence where they heard a person screaming inside. Upon entering, Pedro fired at officers holding the victim hostage. A 7-hr stand off with SWAT ensued, during a shoot out he would die.
2024-02-11	Dominic Soto (23)	Hispanic	Boise, Idaho	Soto was reported by a resident as firing shots near an irrigation canal. When officers responded, he was found holding a handgun and refusing to comply with officers and was shot.
2024-02-11	Erick Radales Aguilera (28)	Hispanic	Jackson, Tennessee	Aguilera opened fire in a nightclub when officers responded. In a struggle with the club security guard, he continued firing as police arrived on scene and shot him. 4 people were found injured with gunshot wounds inside the club.
2024-02-10	Tobin Pico (29)	White	Marana, Arizona	Marana police officers found Pico was impaired after a traffic stop and DUI investigation led them to arrest Pico on suspicion of aggravated DUI. During the process of arresting, Pico fled and firing his handgun at the officers. The officers then returned fire killing him.
2024-02-09	Reynaldo Antonio Nunez-Franco (19)	Hispanic	Glenn Heights, Texas	Police responded to a robbery in progress and resulted in a shoot out.
2024-02-08	Sean Daniel McKay (49)	White	Arlington, Texas	Arlington police officers asked Mckay to turn off his car during a traffic stop. The officer noticed McKay was holding a handgun. Mckay refused to drop the handgun and was being shot by the officer.
2024-02-08	Kenneth Andrew Soto (63)	Unknown	Norco, California	Riverside Sheriff deputies fatally shot a male who allegedly lunged at them with a knife.
2024-02-07	Jamie Devon Blanchard (36)	Black	Harris County, Texas	Blanchard had 5 active warrants for sexual assault of a child when police attempted to apprehend him. He got into a vehicle and was ordered to come out. He did not comply, showed a gun, and was subsequently fired upon.
2024-02-07	Javaria Taylor (19)	Black	Shreveport, Louisiana	Taylor was being served a warrant for murder, armed robbery and home invasion charges. During this attempted arrest, he fired upon officers, shooting one. Gunfire was exchanged that killed him.
2024-02-07	Holly Lynn Graham (32)	White	Columbus, Ohio	Graham was driving a stolen vehicle and driving erratically when an officer came out of his car to confront her. She then drove at the officer, causing them to cling onto the hood of the car, collide into 2 other cars and then fire at Graham. She would later die of her injuries.
2024-02-06	Decarlos Cornelius Long (43)	Black	Orlando, Florida	Police responded to a call about Long attempting to harm himself and when they attempted to make contact with him he charged at them with a knife. He was then shot.
2024-02-06	Donald Friese (39)	White	Granite City, Illinois	Friese was wanted for a prior shooting where he shot an officer. When found by police a chase ensued where Friese attempted to drive through a field to escape and got stuck. He then barricaded himself in the vehicle and began shooting at police. He was killed in a shoot out.
2024-02-06	Erick Seckington (65)	White	Altamonte Springs, Florida	Seckington was said to be walking around the neighborhood with a rifle going from door to door, knocking on residences. When police made contact he refused to drop the weapon and comply. He was shot while raising his rifle pointed at officers over a fence.
2024-02-06	Lee Derek Larson (46)	White	Las Vegas, Nevada	A patrol officer witnessed Larson back into another car in a parking lot and when he exited his Jeep he told Larson to come over to him. Larson then fled and a chase began. During the chase he pointed a firearm at the officer and refused to drop it. He was then shot.
2024-02-06	Jonathan Foster (38)	Unknown	Lancaster, California	Foster was carrying two machetes when he attacked an employee at the Chevron gas station before entering into Albertson's grocery store with the weapons. Police deployed two tasers when he failed to comply with dropping the weapons but he became more agitated and charged the police. He was shot.
2024-02-06	Sterling Alavache (36)	Black	Fort Myers, Florida	A police sniper shot and killed Alavache during a hostage situation at a bank after he allegedly held a woman at knifepoint.
2024-02-06	Chase Ditter (17)	White	Columbus, Nebraska	Police responded to a welfare check after receiving a potential self-harm report. Few details were immediately released, but police deployed a taser before shooting and killing Ditter during the call.
2024-02-05	Boyd Phillips (47)	White	Ozark, Alabama	After threatening several people with a knife at an Ozark bank, Phillips entered his car and a high speed chase occurred. After the pursuit, he barricaded himself inside a house. He was fatally shot by Alabama Law Enforcement Agency SWAT members during the standoff.
2024-02-05	John Gabriel Rice (18)	White	Graham, Texas	Rice was fatally shot after stabbing one of the Graham police officers.
2024-02-05	Raul L. Diaz (59)	Hispanic	Hackettstown, New Jersey	An unmarked police vehicle was involved in a crash with a cyclist that killed them.
2024-02-04	Jonathan Bell (41)	White	Ansonia, Connecticut	Police pursued Bell from Bridgeport until he crashed into a home. After removing a woman from the car, police shot Bell when he reached for an object. No gun was found. The Inspector General called the shooting 'questionable' but declined to prosecute.
2024-02-04	Thomas Michael Gregory Rivera (35)	White	Cherryville, North Carolina	Police responded to an assault and found a man walking down the street while holding a metal pipe. The man allegedly attacked officers and was shot once, dying at hospital.
2024-02-04	Jeremie Coleman (37)	Black	Beaumont, Texas	Police pursued Coleman following a domestic violence call. After he crashed into a ditch, police shot and killed Coleman after he allegedly exited and raised a gun at officers.
2024-02-04	David Clements (19)	Unknown	Massapequa, New York	When the Nassau County police officers responded a 911 about a suicidal man, they encountered Clements with 3 guns outside. He refused to drop the weapons and walked back to the apartment. He then came back and ran down his driveway pointing his gun at them. Officers then fired their weapons killing him.
2024-02-03	Isaac Goodlow III (30)	Black	Carol Stream, Illinois	2 police officers fatally shot Goodlow in his own apartment after responding to a reported domestic violence incident. The incident still remains under investigation.
2024-02-03	Jason Lee Maccani (36)	Unknown	Los Angeles, California	Los Angeles Police officers shot and killed Maccani, who was holding a white plastic fork in Skid Row. Video of the shooting was released on February 20th.
2024-02-03	Fernando Rodriguez-Juarez (26)	Latino	Omaha, Nebraska	Rodriguez-Juarez and Hernandez-Rosales left a club after an argument with a group of people. As members of that group left the club, the two men drove up in a Jeep, and Rodriguez-Juarez fired a shot at them. Two officers working an off-duty job at the club returned fire, striking both men.
2024-02-03	Jonathan Hernandez-Rosales (28)	Latino	Omaha, Nebraska	Rodriguez-Juarez and Hernandez-Rosales left a club after an argument with a group of people. As members of that group left the club, the two men drove up in a Jeep, and Rodriguez-Juarez fired a shot at them. Two officers working an off-duty job at the club returned fire, striking both men.
2024-02-03	Fabian Garcia (23)	Unknown	Tucson, Arizona	After receiving domestic disturbance calls and learning that there were gunshots heard, Tucson Police Department Special Weapons and Tactics Team responded to the scene. During the evacuation, officers encountered Garcia with a rifle. Officers instructed Garcia to put his hands up, but instead he raised his hands towards the rifle. Four officers then discharged their service weapons killing him.
2024-02-03	Ernesto Rodriguez (39)	Hispanic	Riverside, California	A little after 3:30 am police respond to a domestic disturbance at a residence where a man is threatening a woman with a knife in front of her family. After evacuating the victims, attempted negotiation occurred and Rodriguez refused to exit the home or drop the knife. He was shot.
2024-02-02	Richard Bolen (37)	White	Hanover, Pennsylvania	Bolen, a wanted fugitive, allegedly brandished a handgun at officers and was shot to death.
2024-02-02	Lawrence Drennan (36)	Unknown	Winnebago County, Wisconsin	Drennan fled a traffic stop which led to a pursuit, during the pursuit, he placed a 911 call informing that he has a gun. When the pursuit ended, he stepped out the vehicle and started to approach the officers. One officer fired his weapon striking him. No criminal charges will be filed against the officer.
2024-02-02	Roshod Graham (32)	Black	Plantation, Florida	A pursuit occurred between Graham and Plantation police officers after he rammed into a gas station. The pursuit ended after his car broke down. He was shot by officers while he allegedly attempted to take an officer's gun.
2024-02-02	Lisa Haight (36)	Unknown	Hamburg, New York	Haight, who was suspected in a burglary, was tracked into a second home. An altercation ensued in which an officer shot and killed Haight. A knife was allegedly recovered at the scene.
2024-02-02	Edward Ahrens (38)	White	East Ridge, Tennessee	Ahrens allegedly abducted a 11-year-old girl. During a car chase, he refused to stop and reportedly attacked officers with his car, injuring three. Ahrens was shot by four officers and died.
2024-02-02	John Baldwin (51)	Unknown	Summerville, South Carolina	A police chase ending at a residence resulted in a shoot out that killed Baldwin. His home was also on fire.
2024-02-02	Arsenio Más (55)	Unknown	Port St Lucie, Florida	Más, a truck driver, was struck and killed by Trooper Zachary Fink during a pursuit of a fleeing suspect. The suspect was arrested later and Fink was also killed during the accident.
2024-02-01	Robert Beal (80)	White	Goshen, Indiana	A deputy who was texting while driving veered into Beal's lane, causing a collision. Beal died, his wife and the deputy sustained serious injuries. The deputy has been charged with misdemeanor vehicular manslaughter.
2024-02-01	Melvin Jay (31)	Black	Suitland-Silver Hill, Maryland	A Prince George's County police officer fatally shot Jay in his apartment after a relative of Jay's reported a breaking and entering. The officer entered the apartment without identifying himself and shot Jay after telling him to show his hands. Police stated a gun was found in Jay's pocket, though it is unclear if he was holding it when he was shot.

== See also ==
- Death in custody § United States
- Henry A. Wallace Police Crime Public Database
- List of cases of police brutality
- List of countries with annual rates and counts for killings by law enforcement officers
- List of law enforcement officers killed in the line of duty in the United States
- List of law enforcement officers convicted for an on-duty killing in the United States
- List of shootings by US immigration agents
- List of police reforms related to the George Floyd protests
- List of unarmed African Americans killed by law enforcement officers in the United States
- Lists of killings by law enforcement officers
- Police brutality in the United States
- Police misconduct § United States
- Police riot § United States
- Police use of deadly force in the United States
