= SR22 =

SR22 or SR-22 may refer to:

- SR-22 (insurance), an official liability insurance document required in some US states
- Cirrus SR22, a type of general aviation light aircraft
- State Route 22, which may be any one of many highways numbered 22
- Ruger SR22, a 22 caliber pistol
- Ruger SR-22, a 22 caliber rifle
