= Ruger AR-556 =

Semi-automatic rifle by Sturm, Ruger & Co.

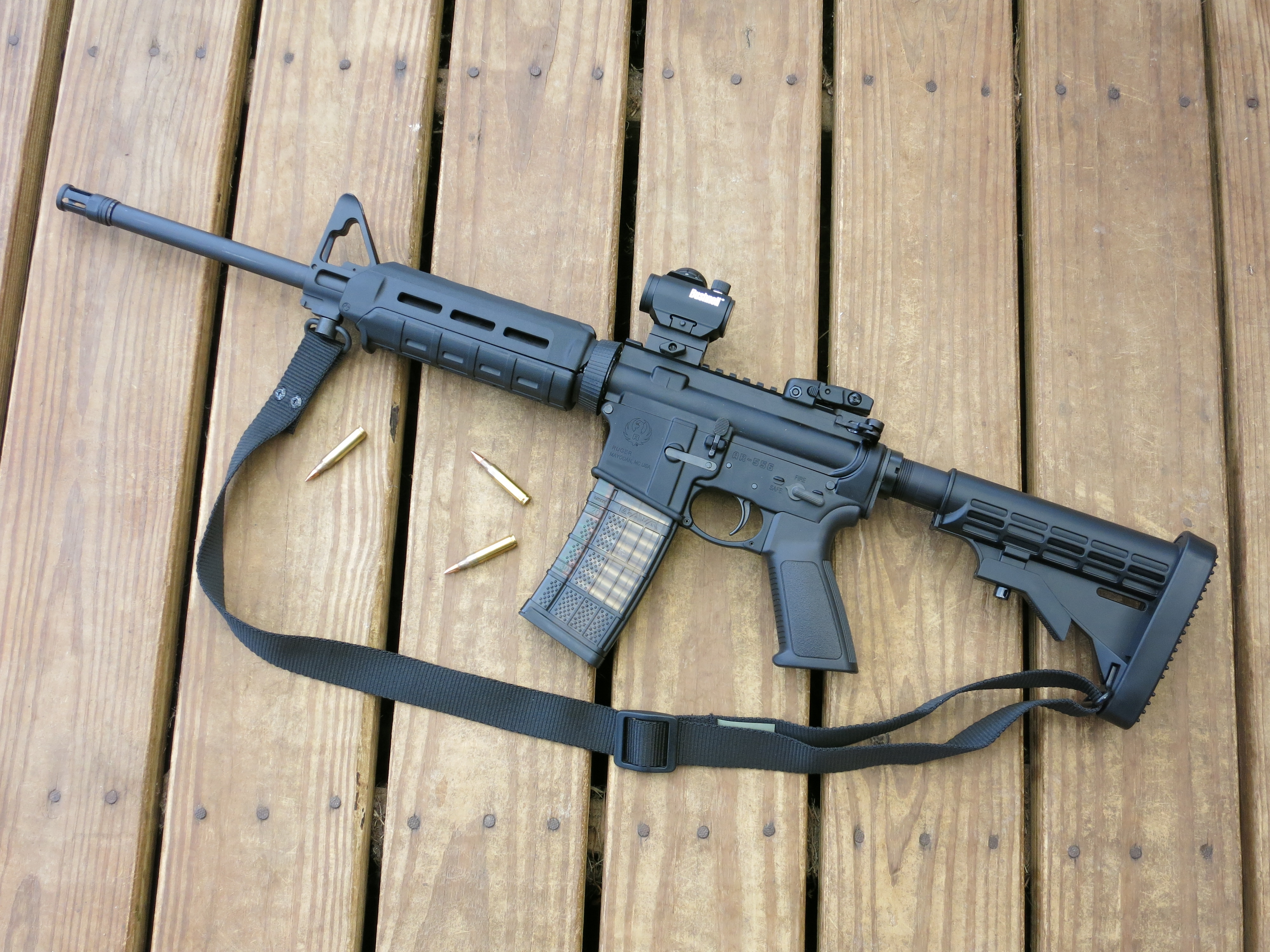
- A Ruger AR-556
- Type: Semi-automatic rifle
- Place of origin: United States

Production history
- Designed: 2014
- Manufacturer: Sturm, Ruger & Co.
- Unit cost: $989 MSRP, Standard (2022)
- Produced: 2014–2025

Specifications (Standard)
- Mass: 2.9 kg (6.5 lb)
- Length: 819 mm (32.25 in) (collapsed); 902 mm (35.50 in) (extended)
- Barrel length: 409 mm (16.10 in)
- Width: 64 mm (2.5 in)
- Height: 200 mm (8 in)
- Cartridge: 5.56x45mm/.223 Remington
- Action: Gas-operated, rotating bolt
- Feed system: STANAG magazine
- Sights: Fixed front iron sight, flip-up rear

The Ruger AR-556 is a semi-automatic AR-15 style rifle manufactured by U.S. firearms company Sturm, Ruger & Co. Introduced in 2014 as an entry-level AR-15 using a direct impingement action, with variants since being released such as the upgraded AR-556 MPR (multi-purpose rifle) in 2017 and the AR-556 pistol in 2019. On 31 December 2025, Ruger announced the new Harrier rifle as a replacement for the AR-556.

== Overview ==
The standard model makes use of a traditional direct impingement with a 7 in (180 mm) carbine length gas system and has a cold hammer forged 4140 chrome-moly steel barrel with 1:8 in (200 mm) twist rifling and a birdcage style flash hider. The bolt is machined from 9310 alloy steel, and the furniture included is a CAR-15 style handguard without aluminum heatshields, an M4 buttstock, and a Ruger designed pistol grip. The included sights are a fixed front sight post and a Ruger Rapid Deploy rear flip-up sight. The gas block and sight post design is proprietary to Ruger and consists of a quick detach sling swivel socket and bayonet lug.

The MPR model uses a 9 in (230 mm) mid-length gas system and a radial port muzzle brake, and also includes a free-float handguard with M-LOK accessory slots and a continuous top picatinny rail, and either a Magpul or B5 Systems buttstock and pistol grip.

The AR-556 Pistol has a 10.5 in (270 mm) barrel with a free float handguard with M-LOK slots and an SB Tactical SBA3 Pistol Stabilizing Brace, and is also available in .300 AAC Blackout and .350 Legend.

All models include a standard 30 round Magpul PMAG in the box, except those sold in states with magazine capacity limits where a 10 round aluminum magazine is included.

== Criminal use ==
There have been five recorded shootings involving the Ruger AR-556:

- On 30 July 2016, 19-year-old Allen Christopher Ivanov fatally shot three people with a Ruger AR-556 rifle during a house party held by students of the University of Washington and Kamiak High School in Mukilteo, Washington, United States.
- On 5 November 2017, 26-year-old Devin Patrick Kelley fatally shot 26 people and wounded 20 others with a Ruger AR-556 rifle at a church in Sutherland Springs, Texas, United States.
- On 15 March 2019, 28-year-old Brenton Harrison Tarrant fatally shot 51 people and wounded 40 others at two mosques in Christchurch, New Zealand, with one of his weapons identified as a Ruger AR-556 rifle.
- On 22 March 2021, 21-year-old Ahmad Al Aliwi Al-Issa fatally shot 10 people with a Ruger AR-556 pistol at a King Soopers supermarket in Boulder, Colorado, United States.
- On 15 April 2021, 19-year-old Brandon Scott Hole fatally shot eight people and wounded four others with a Ruger AR-556 rifle and another AR-15 style rifle at a FedEx facility in Indianapolis, Indiana, United States.

== Marketing lawsuit ==
After the 2021 Boulder shooting, families of five of the victims have sued Sturm, Ruger & Co. for "marketing its AR-556 pistol, which resembles a rifle, in a 'reckless' and 'immoral' way that promoted its killing capability and glorifying lone gunmen." The Protection of Lawful Commerce in Arms Act limits the legal liability of gun manufacturers, but does not prevent litigation from their marketing practices.

== See also ==
- Ruger SR-556 – Model of AR-15 style semi-automatic rifle
- Ruger Mini-14 – Semi-automatic rifle
- Ruger 10/22 – Semi-automatic rifle by Sturm, Ruger & Co.
