= David Conley =

David Conley may refer to:

- David Conley (musician) (born 1953), American jazz flute player, songwriter, and producer
- David Conley, Jr., contestant from The Amazing Race
- David Ray Conley III, suspect in the 2015 Harris County shooting
