= Wedgwood Baptist Church shooting =

1999 mass shooting in Fort Worth, Texas, United States

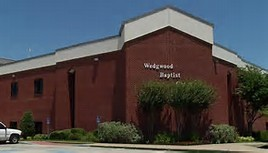
- Wedgwood Baptist Church, where the shooting occurred

- Wedgwood Baptist Church (Texas) Wedgwood Baptist Church (the United States)
- Location: 32.6643°N 97.3845°W; Fort Worth, Texas, U.S.
- Date: September 15, 1999; 27 years ago
- Target: Congregants of Wedgewood Baptist Church
- Attack type: Mass shooting, mass murder, murder-suicide, hate crime
- Weapons: 9mm Ruger P85 semi-automatic handgun; .380 ACP AMT Backup semi-automatic handgun; Pipe bomb
- Deaths: 8 (including the perpetrator)
- Injuries: 7
- Perpetrator: Larry Gene Ashbrook
- Motive: Anti-Christian sentiment

On September 15, 1999, a mass shooting occurred at Wedgwood Baptist Church in Fort Worth, Texas. 47-year-old Larry Gene Ashbrook entered the church during a See You at the Pole Rally featuring a concert by the Christian rock group Forty Days, where he killed seven people and wounded seven others before committing suicide. Most of the victims were teenagers.

Prior to the shooting, he had displayed behavior considered erratic and frightening by those around him, and had mailed multiple letters to a local newspaper proclaiming he was being framed for murder and being watched by intelligence agencies. During the shooting, Ashbrook disparaged Christianity and the beliefs of the churchgoers.

== Shooting ==
Ashbrook arrived at the Wedgwood Baptist Church wearing mirrored sunglasses and a pullover. As he entered the church, he did not put out his cigarette, which was viewed by churchgoers as odd. According to an injured victim, Ashbrook asked him: "Is this where that damn religious meeting is being held?"; he planned to tell Ashbrook to put out his cigarette, but Ashbrook then proceeded to pull out a gun from under his shirt and shoot him twice. He interrupted a teen prayer rally, slamming his hand on a door to make his presence known. Spouting anti-Christian rhetoric, he opened fire with a Ruger 9 mm semi-automatic handgun and a .380-caliber handgun.

At first, many people believed the attack was a planned skit, which enraged Ashbrook further, and two people with cameras began to film him. He opened fire on both, killing one, Justin Ray, and disabled both cameras. The lead guitarist for the band "40 days", thinking it was an overlong skit, got back on onstage and glared at Ashbrook, who proceeded to fire bullets at the guitarist, but missed.

He reloaded several times during the shooting; three empty magazines were found at the scene. Ashbrook threw a pipe bomb into the church, where it exploded upwards and released shrapnel. There were no deaths from the bomb. Seven people were killed, four of whom were teenagers (a 14-year-old boy, two 14-year-old girls and a 17-year-old boy). Three people sustained major injuries while four others received relatively minor injuries. One of those seriously wounded, Justin Laird, who had turned 16 years old on the day of the attack, was struck in the spine by the perpetrator's gunfire, and is paralyzed from the chest down.

During the shooting, Ashbrook was confronted by a 19-year-old former football lineman, Jeremiah "Jeremy" Neitz, who recounted the ensuing conversation for the Houston Press:

I don't know why, but I just sat there, looking at him as he came toward me. When he got to within about five feet, he pointed one of his guns at me and just glared. I told him, "Sir, you don't have to be doing this." He told me to shut the hell up. Then he asked me what my religion was, and I told him I was a Christian, a Baptist. He said, "That sucks," and that it was "a stupid religion." [Neitz replied] "No sir, it doesn't suck. It's a wonderful thing. God put me on this earth for a reason. I'm certain of that."

Victims

  - Kristi Kathleen Beckel, 14
  - Shawn Christopher Brown, 23
  - Sydney Rochelle Browning, 36
  - Joseph Daniel Ennis, 14
  - Cassandra Fawn Griffin, 14
  - Susan Kimberley Jones, 23
  - Justin Michael Ray, 17

— Source:

Ashbrook fired several more rounds and yelled, "This religion is bullshit." Neitz replied, "Sir, what you need is Jesus Christ in your life." Neitz asked Ashbrook "What about you?" Ashbrook replied, "Fuck off" and "I can't believe you believe in this junk." He then sat down in a pew and shot himself. The shooting lasted less than 10 minutes.

Time magazine described accounts of the confrontation as "unconfirmed" and possibly "pious invention", but the Houston Press wrote that the story had been confirmed, quoting the Fort Worth police detective who had interviewed Neitz: "Maybe he did frustrate Ashbrook with what he was saying. There's no way we'll ever really know. All I can say is that I'm impressed by what he did that evening. It was a very brave thing. You have to admire that."

== Perpetrator ==
Larry Gene Ashbrook, the perpetrator

The shooter was 47-year-old Larry Gene Ashbrook, born July 10, 1952. Nine years before the shooting, Ashbrook's mother died. This reportedly sent him into a cycle of erratic and frightening behavior. Ashbrook lived for many years with his father, Jack D. Ashbrook. Across the street from the Ashbrooks' home, neighbors said they saw Ashbrook treat his father violently but were afraid to report it. Jack Ashbrook died at age 85 on July 20, 1999, a little less than 2 months before his son carried out his attack. Newspaper editor Stephen Kaye, whom Ashbrook had visited days before the shooting, described him as being "the opposite of someone you'd be concerned about", saying he "couldn't have been any nicer." In Ashbrook's home, police found materials used to make pipe bombs. He had legally purchased the Ruger and the .380 caliber at a flea market February 13 and 15 of the year, from two different sellers.

However, his neighbors had an entirely different view of him, describing him as strange and violent. Investigators at his house discovered that he had virtually destroyed the interior of his house - holes were bashed into the walls with crowbars, the toilets were filled with concrete, and the fruit trees growing in the front yard had been poisoned. He sent "rambling" letters to the Fort Worth Star-Telegram describing encounters with the CIA. His brother described him as a paranoid schizophrenic.

Police investigating the shooting could find no solid motive for the crime. In the months before the shooting, people who knew Ashbrook said he became increasingly paranoid, certain that he was being framed for serial murder and other crimes that he did not commit. He also feared that the CIA was targeting him, and he reported psychological warfare, assaults by co-workers and being drugged by the police. Just days before the shooting he voiced these concerns to a newspaper, saying "I want someone to tell my story, no one will listen to me; no one will believe me."

According to those who knew Ashbrook when he was a child, the shooter "resented being made to attend church three times a week" and journals left behind at his house contained anti-religious material. Reportedly, Ashbrook mutilated a Bible before the attack.

Houston-area writer John Craig claimed that Ashbrook was a member of Phineas Priesthood, an anti-Semitic hate group, and he interviewed Ashbrook in 1997. Craig said he notified the FBI after the interview and called the Fort Worth police after realizing he knew the shooter but FBI official said there were no plans to pursue Craig's story, and police spokesman Lt. David Ellis said he had no knowledge that Craig had called. Several representatives of organizations that monitor hate groups said Ashbrook appeared nowhere in their databases. Some believe that Ashbrook targeted a Southern Baptist church because the Texas Baptist Association had called for members to convert Jews.

== Aftermath ==
In the immediate aftermath, Ashbrook's identity was unknown. The church was closed to check for explosives. President Clinton stated after the shooting "Yet again, we have seen a sanctuary violated by gun violence, taking children brimming with faith and promise and hope before their time." George W. Bush, then presidential candidate and governor of Texas, cancelled two fundraisers and returned to the state. He condemned a "wave of evil" and said the solution was "more love in society".

A Sunday service was held just four days after the shooting, as the lead pastor of the church, Al Meredith, said they did not wish to "give an inch to the darkness." During his sermon at the service, he said that "this tragedy that the devil wanted to use to stop the people of God has ended up strengthening us", and that the shooting had united the church. He preached forgiveness for Ashbrook, describing him as a "poor man" influenced by Satan. He, and other members of the church, later met with Ashbrook's family.

Meredith expressed his condolences for victims of the Charleston church shooting in 2015 and the Sutherland Springs church shooting in 2017. On the 20th anniversary of the shooting, he stated, referring to the recent mass shootings in El Paso and Dayton: “[we] hardly get shocked anymore, [...] after three days, it’s old news. And all our thoughts and prayers, that’s about all we can conjure up for the victims. There’s something tragically wrong with that.” A memorial service was held at the church for the 20th anniversary.

Following the attack, the seven victims were recognized as Christian martyrs. A memorial to them was constructed outside the church.

== See also ==
- Daingerfield church shooting
- Charleston church shooting
- Sutherland Springs church shooting
- West Freeway Church of Christ shooting
- Anti-Christian sentiment
- List of shootings in Texas
- List of rampage killers in the United States
