= 2017 Plano shooting =

Mass shooting in Texas, U.S.

- Location: 1712 West Spring Creek Parkway, Plano, Texas, US
- Date: September 10, 2017; 8 p.m. (CDT)
- Attack type: Mass shooting, mass murder, shootout
- Weapons: AR-15 semi-automatic rifle; Kushnapup Series V shotgun (Unconfirmed); Ruger .380-caliber pistol
- Deaths: 9 (including the perpetrator)
- Injuries: 1
- Perpetrator: Spencer James Hight
- Motive: Jealousy

On September 10, 2017, a mass shooting occurred at a home in Plano, Texas, United States. The gunman, 32-year-old Spencer Hight, killed eight people and injured a ninth in the home before being killed by police.

== Background ==
Spencer James Hight (October 20, 1984 – September 10, 2017), originally from Orange County, California, and Meredith Lane met while students at the University of Texas at Dallas (UTD); Lane previously attended a tertiary institution in the State of Georgia before transferring to UTD. The couple married in May 2011. The house in which the shooting occurred had been purchased by the Hights in 2015. The couple had no children. After the shooting, Lane's mother stated that there was a violent episode where Hight had slammed her daughter's head against a wall, and that she had not reported it to the police.

Hight had lost his contracting job at Texas Instruments near when the house was purchased.

The couple stopped living together in March, and Meredith filed for divorce in July citing "discord or conflict of personalities." Meredith Hight's mother claims that her daughter wanted the divorce since her husband was physically abusive and an alcoholic. She says her daughter had tried helping him for two years before filing the divorce. Friends of Spencer Hight reported that before the shooting, he was unable to find work, had become isolated, and was drinking alcohol heavily.

== Shooting ==
People inside the home at the time of the shooting said a Dallas Cowboys watching party was being held at their house. Meredith Lane, the owner of the house, was hosting a party for coworkers and friends.

At around 8 p.m. officers were called to a home on West Spring Creek Parkway after reports of 30 to 40 shots being fired. Police entered the home and shot and killed the gunman. Inside, police found nine adults with gunshot wounds. Seven were dead, and two others were transported to a local hospital. One of the injured later died. Police say the shooter and all of the victims were adults. They were in their twenties and thirties. Two of the victims had participated in Hight and Lane's wedding. James Richard Dunlop had been best man, and Rion Christopher Morgan had been a groomsman.

The shooter was identified as Spencer James Hight, and the apparent target of the shooting was his ex-wife, Meredith.

Plano Police Chief Greg W. Rushin said: "We've never had a shooting of this magnitude; never had this many victims."

== Aftermath ==
The Junior League of Collin County organized a vigil for the victims of the attack 10 days afterwards. The family of Spencer Hight released a statement, which said in part: "There can be no rational excuse for his horrific actions. We, as a family, express our deepest sorrow and condolences to all of the families and friends of the victims. These young, vibrant lives did not deserve to be taken."

In April 2019, a bartender at Local Public House in Plano was charged for serving Hight alcohol, knowing he was intoxicated. The charge carries a fine of up to $500, up to a year in jail, or both. According to the charging documents, she sent texts to a friend concerned about how drunk he was and brought a large knife he was exposing at the bar while commenting: "Spencer has a big knife on the bar and is spinning it and just asked for his tab and said I have to go do some dirty work ... Psychoooooooo." Hight left the bar and committed the murders. In October 2019, a grand jury declined to indict her.

In 2021, the sole wounded victim was awarded $85 million by a jury in a lawsuit case against the Local Public House bar that served the heavily intoxicated gunman.

== Victims ==
- Meredith Hight, 27
- Anthony Cross, 33
- Olivia Deffner, 24
- James Dunlop, 29
- Daryl Hawkins, 22
- Rion Morgan, 31
- Myah Bass, 28
- Caleb Edwards, 25
- Carly Shockey, 25 (survived, shot in face)

== See also ==
- 2014 Harris County shooting
- 2015 Harris County shooting
