= 2025 Lexington shootings =

Mass shooting in Kentucky, U.S.

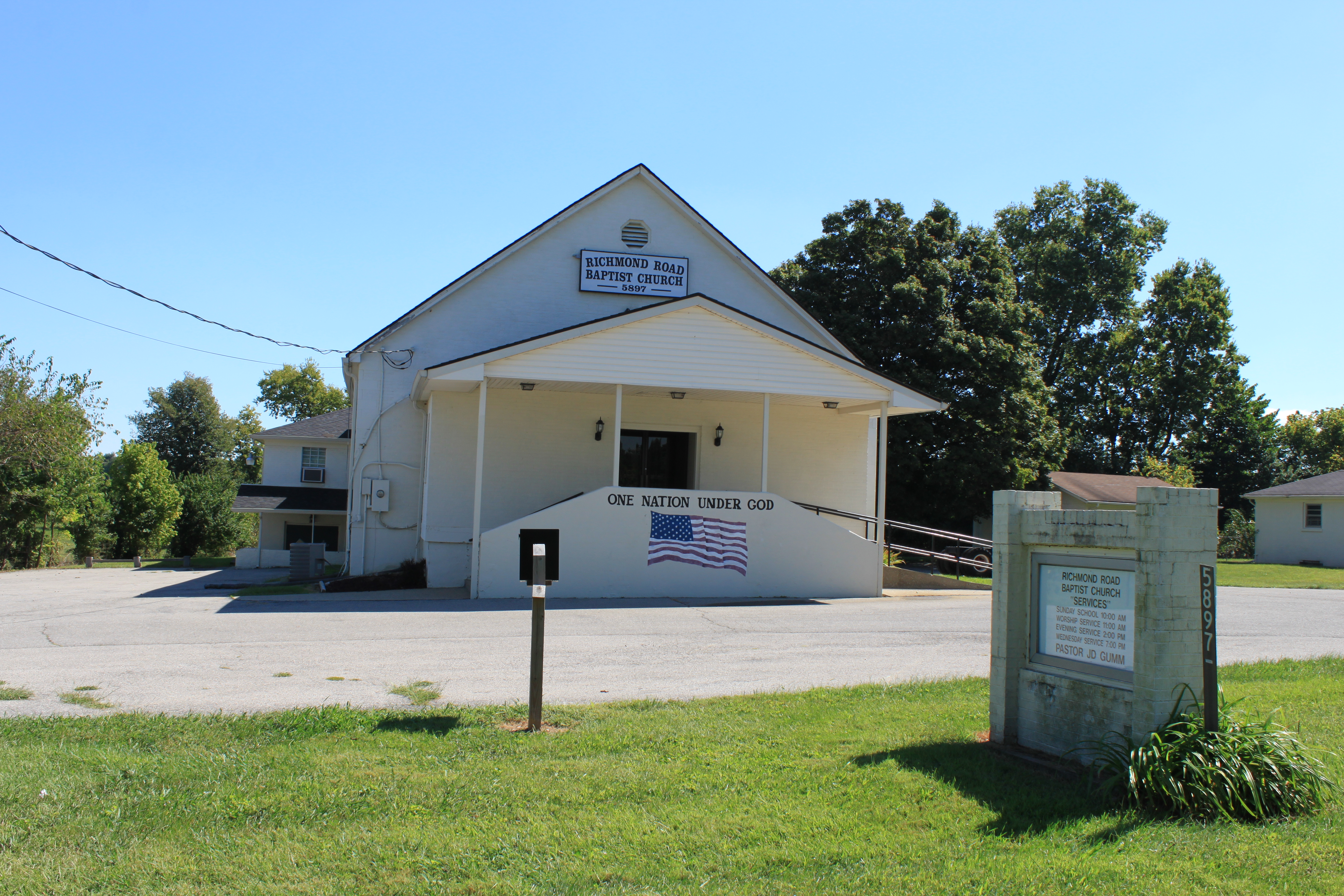
- Richmond Road Baptist Church in 2011
- 1 Shooting of Kentucky State Police trooper 2 Carjacking; 3 Location of church
- Location: 37°56′23.6796″N 84°24′19.8648″W; Lexington, Kentucky, U.S.
- Date: July 13, 2025 c.11:35 a.m. (EST)
- Target: Mother of perpetrator's children
- Attack type: Mass shooting; spree shooting; attempted uxoricide
- Deaths: 3 (including the perpetrator)
- Injuries: 3
- Perpetrator: Guy E. House
- Motive: Attempt to kill mother of children

On July 13, 2025, a shooting spree took place in Lexington, Kentucky, United States, that left three people dead, including the perpetrator, along with three others critically wounded, including a state trooper that was shot twice during the initial shooting. The incident began when 47-year-old Guy E. House shot and injured a Kentucky State Police trooper near Blue Grass Airport during a traffic stop, before fleeing and carjacking a woman at a retirement community. With the woman's vehicle, he drove to Richmond Road Baptist Church, where he shot and killed two people and injured two others, including the pastor, before he was fatally shot by police.

== Shootings ==
The shooting began around 11:35 am EST when 47-year-old Guy E. House shot Jude Remilien, a Kentucky State Police trooper, near Blue Grass Airport on Terminal Drive during a traffic stop in which Remilien had received a license plate reader alert. Remilien had asked House and the driver routine traffic stop questions when House opened fire on him and struck him in the leg.

Jimmy Alexander, a bystander, used his belt to create a tourniquet for Remilien's leg. Alexander was joined by his wife Jessica Alexander and daughter Taylor Hall, two registered nurses who applied pressure to the gunshot wound. Mrs. Alexander and Hall also gave Remilien water, checked his pulse, and asked him questions to keep him from falling unconscious. They were then joined by Blue Grass Airport officer, Adam Arnold, who radioed for help and applied a proper tourniquet to Remilien's leg. The driver of the vehicle House was in also aided Remilien after he was shot.

After shooting Remilien, the driver and House both exited the vehicle and House got into the driver's seat. House then drove to Sayre Christian Village, a retirement community where his mother used to live. House confronted a woman in the parking lot who was visiting a family member and stole her vehicle. The woman escaped uninjured into the retirement community.

House then drove to Richmond Road Baptist Church while being pursued by police officers. House entered the church through a back door and asked if the mother of his three children was in attendance. Parishioners told House that she wasn't there, to which he responded that "someone is gonna have to die" before opening fire.

House fatally shot 72-year-old Beverly Gumm in the chest inside the church before going outside where he killed 34-year-old Christina Combs and injured Gumm's husband and the church pastor. House was then confronted by police who shot and killed him.

== Perpetrator ==
The perpetrator was identified as 47-year-old Guy E. House (June 20, 1978 – July 13, 2025), a native from Pewee Valley, Kentucky who lived in Lexington throughout most of his life. House was the father to three children and a rapper with the stage name HonKyKong. House had a lengthy criminal history dating all the way back to his first crime in 1999, which included two speeding charges out of Ohio in 2011, as well as auto theft in Kentucky. On September 11, 2022, House was arrested and charged with 1st degree fleeing and evading, resisting arrest, and possession of a handgun by a convicted felon.

An ex-girlfriend of House had filed for a domestic violence restraining order against him in summer 2025. Court documents allege that House had begun menacing her, stalking her, and threatening to get her fired from her job. On July 4, when she broke up with him, House stole her car, driver's license, and several of her guns. House had been scheduled to attend the domestic violence hearing in court the day after the attack.

== Reaction and aftermath ==
Kentucky Governor Andy Beshear responded on X writing "I'm heartbroken to share the shooting in Lexington at Richmond Road Baptist Church has taken the lives of two people. Other injuries — including a Kentucky State Police trooper from the initial stop — are being treated at a nearby hospital. The shooter has also been killed."

Lexington Mayor Linda Gorton issued a statement and offered her prayers to the victims stating "Like so many communities across the country, today our community has experienced a mass shooting, resulting in multiple deaths and injuries.

The following week, on July 20, the church reopened for Sunday services. Rachel Barnes, who lost her mother and a sister in the attack, said that "We're all just trying to stick together and help each other".

On August 21, a house of worship security training session was hosted at Anderson Public Library in Lawrenceburg in response to the shooting. Over 60 people attended the course where they were taught to develop a comprehensive plan in case of emergencies such as a lockdown procedure and the creation of designated safe rooms, how to act during an attack, and instructions on basic triage techniques.

On October 23, the three civilians and a Blue Grass Airport Police officer who aided Jude Remilien, the trooper wounded at Blue Grass Airport, were honored by the Kentucky State Police with the Citation of Meritorious Achievement. The award is the highest honor the Kentucky State Police can award to a civilian or non-employee.

== See also ==
- 2025 Annunciation Catholic Church shooting, a church shooting which happened a month later
- Crime in Kentucky
- 2024 Interstate 75 Kentucky shooting, a Kentucky mass shooting which happened less than a year earlier
- Sutherland Springs church shooting, the deadliest house of worship shooting in U.S. history
