= 2022 Vestavia Hills church shooting =

Church shooting in Vestavia Hills, Alabama

Vestavia Hills church shooting
- Location: 33°28′8.0″N 86°43′50.5″W; St. Stephen's Episcopal Church, 3775 Crosshaven Drive; Vestavia Hills, Alabama, U.S.
- Date: June 16, 2022; 6:22 p.m. – c. 6:30 p.m. (UTC−06:00)
- Attack type: Shooting, homicide, triple-murder
- Weapon: Handgun
- Deaths: 3
- Injuries: 1 (the perpetrator)
- Perpetrator: Robert Findlay Smith
- Verdict: Pleaded Guilty: Sentenced to life imprisonment without parole
- Convictions: Capital Murder x3

The Vestavia Hills church shooting occurred on June 16, 2022, at 6:22 p.m. local time in Vestavia Hills, a suburb of Birmingham, Alabama, United States. A man entered the St. Stephen's Episcopal Church and opened fire during a potluck meeting, which the church had previously advertised. Two people were killed at the scene, a third died later in hospital, and the suspect was subsequently in custody. The suspect was a 70-year-old Birmingham man named Robert Findlay Smith (born December 23, 1951), a gun dealer. On May 2, 2023, Smith pled guilty in the shooting and was sentenced to life without parole.

== Shooting ==
The shooter opened fire, killing three, and was stopped when a 79-year-old male, later identified as retired investigator James W. Musgrove Jr., whacked him over the head with a folding chair, took his gun, and pistol whipped him, thus subduing the assailant. Musgrove was later awarded the Carnegie medal for his actions.

== Victims ==
- Sarah Yeager, 75
- Walter Rainey, 84
- Jane Pounds, 84, initially reported injured, died at a local hospital. Her family requested that her name be withheld, but it was made public by the press.

== Reactions ==
Following the shooting, Alabama governor Kay Ivey issued a statement saying that the shooting is "shocking and tragic," adding that "this should never happen — in a church, in a store, in the city or anywhere."

During a Sunday morning service on June 19, 2022, the church gathered to honor the members who were shot and killed during the shooting.

== See also ==
- Gun violence in the United States
- List of mass shootings in the United States in 2022
