= West Freeway Church of Christ shooting =

2019 shooting attack in Texas, U.S.

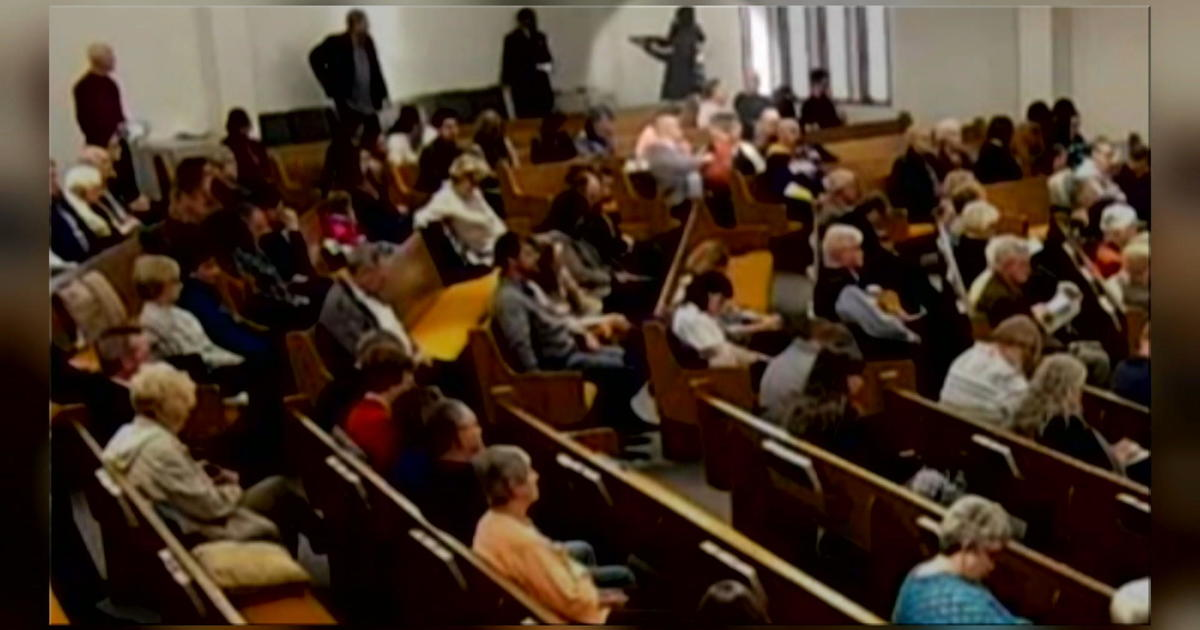
- The opening shots of the West Freeway Church of Christ shooting, which only lasted ~3 seconds.
- Location: 1900 S Las Vegas Trail; White Settlement, Texas, U.S.
- Date: December 29, 2019
- Attack type: Shooting
- Weapons: Perpetrator: 12-gauge Sawed-off shotgun; Defender: .357 SIG Sig Sauer P229 semi-automatic pistol
- Deaths: 3 (including the perpetrator)
- Injuries: 0
- Perpetrator: Keith Thomas Kinnunen
- Defender: Jack Wilson
- Motive: Unknown

The West Freeway Church of Christ shooting took place on December 29, 2019, in White Settlement, Texas, United States. Keith Thomas Kinnunen killed two people in the congregation with a shotgun before Kinnunen was fatally shot by 71-year-old Jack Wilson, a volunteer security team member. The attack was live-streamed, as are all services at the church. Video of the shooting appeared online in real time, and was captured, leading to multiple posts on Twitter, YouTube and Rumble with videos showing the shooting and aftermath.

== Shooting ==
Keith Thomas Kinnunen shot and killed two members of the church before he was fatally shot by Jack Wilson, the head of the church's volunteer security team, ending the attack within six seconds. The victims were Anton Wallace, age 64, and Richard White, age 67. Wilson is a firearms instructor and a former reserve deputy sheriff in Hood County, Texas.

Kinnunen, wearing a fake beard and a hat, briefly spoke to Anton Wallace before drawing a shotgun and leveling it. Upon Kinnunen drawing his shotgun, churchgoers Richard White and Jack Wilson both drew their pistols. However, as they were drawing their pistols, Kinnunen opened fire, killing White with a single shot before immediately turning and firing his second shot at Wallace, killing him. Kinnunen then turned to his left, presumably to open fire on the crowd, and was then shot dead by Wilson.

Wilson indicated that five or six other members of the church assembly also drew their own weapons in response to the shooting but only Wilson's weapon was fired.

Wilson shot Kinnunen in the head using a Sig Sauer P229 chambered in .357 Sig from 45–47 feet away.

== Perpetrator ==
The perpetrator was identified as 43-year-old Keith Thomas Kinnunen (November 26, 1976 - December 29, 2019), of Tucson, Arizona, who lived in River Oaks, Texas at the time of the shooting. Upon entering he was wearing a fake beard and wig and immediately raised the suspicions of the security deacons serving the church. Kinnunen had attended multiple services at the church prior.

== See also ==
- Daingerfield church shooting
- Sutherland Springs church shooting
- List of shootings in Texas
- Crime in Texas
- Live streaming crime
- List of filmed mass shootings
