= Sutherland Springs, Texas =

- Unincorporated community
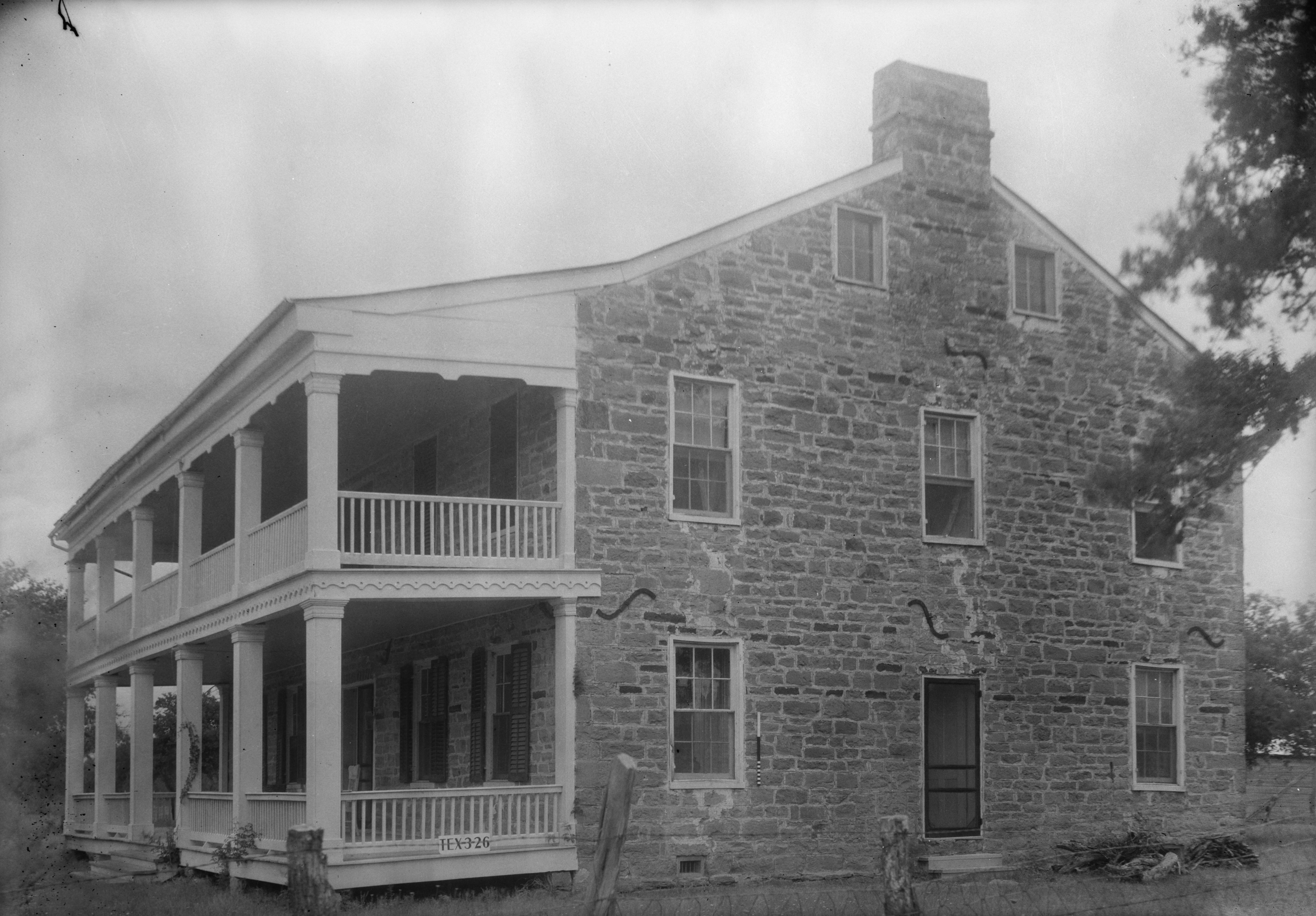
- Historic building in Sutherland Springs
- Interactive map of Sutherland Springs, Texas
- Coordinates: 29°16′24″N 98°03′24″W
- Country: United States
- State: Texas
- County: Wilson
- Established: 1854
- Founder: John Sutherland
- Elevation: 466 ft (142 m)

Population (2017)
  - Total: 600
- Time zone: UTC-6 (CST)
- ZIP code: 78161
- GNIS feature ID: 1369438
- Website: Handbook of Texas

Sutherland Springs is an unincorporated community located on the old Spanish land grant of Manuel Tarin in northern Wilson County, Texas, United States. It is located on U.S. Highway 87 at the intersection of Farm to Market Road 539.

On November 5, 2017, Sutherland Springs was the scene of the deadliest shooting in a place of worship in the United States, in which 26 people were killed and 22 others injured in a local church before the shooter committed suicide.

== History ==
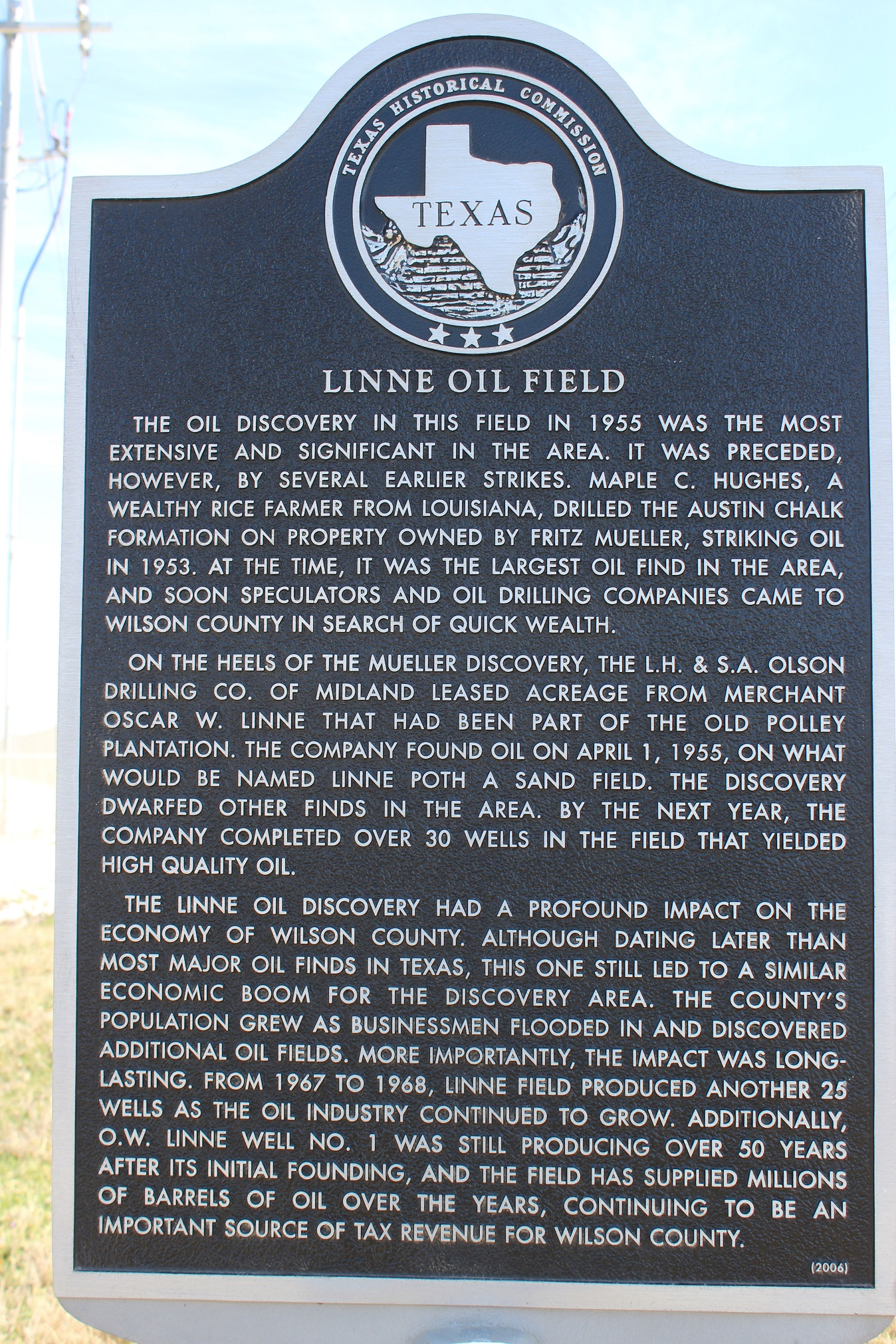
Texas Historical Commission marker, Linne Oil Field

Sutherland Springs was platted in 1854, and named after John Sutherland Jr., a pioneer citizen. A post office has been in operation at Sutherland Springs since 1851.

== 2017 shooting ==
On November 5, 2017, Devin Patrick Kelley shot 26 people dead and injured 22 at the community's First Baptist Church. The gunfire was heard by Stephen Willeford, a church neighbor and former NRA instructor, who grabbed his weapon and ran toward the scene barefoot. Willeford seriously wounded Kelley in a rapid exchange of gunfire, then corralled a nearby car and chased Kelley as he tried to flee the scene in his truck. After a high-speed chase, Kelley succumbed to a self-inflicted gunshot wound to the head. He was found dead in a roadside ditch. It was the deadliest mass shooting in Texas history, surpassing the Luby's shooting in October 1991 and the fifth deadliest mass shooting in the history of the United States. This incident would also become the deadliest mass shooting at a place of holy in the United States, surpassing both the 1991 Waddell Buddhist Temple Shooting, and the 2015 Charleston Church Shooting.

== Geography ==
Old Sutherland Springs occupies a portion of the south bank of Cibolo Creek, with New Sutherland Springs (which is mostly in ruins) on the north bank of the creek.

== Bibliography ==
- The Good Old Days: A History of LaVernia was published by members of the civic government class at LaVernia High School for the 1936–37 academic school year.
- Wilson County Centennial 1860-1960 was published by the Wilson County Library; it is the official centennial program handed out by the local community for the "100-year celebration" of the county's establishment.
