= Ruger SR22 =

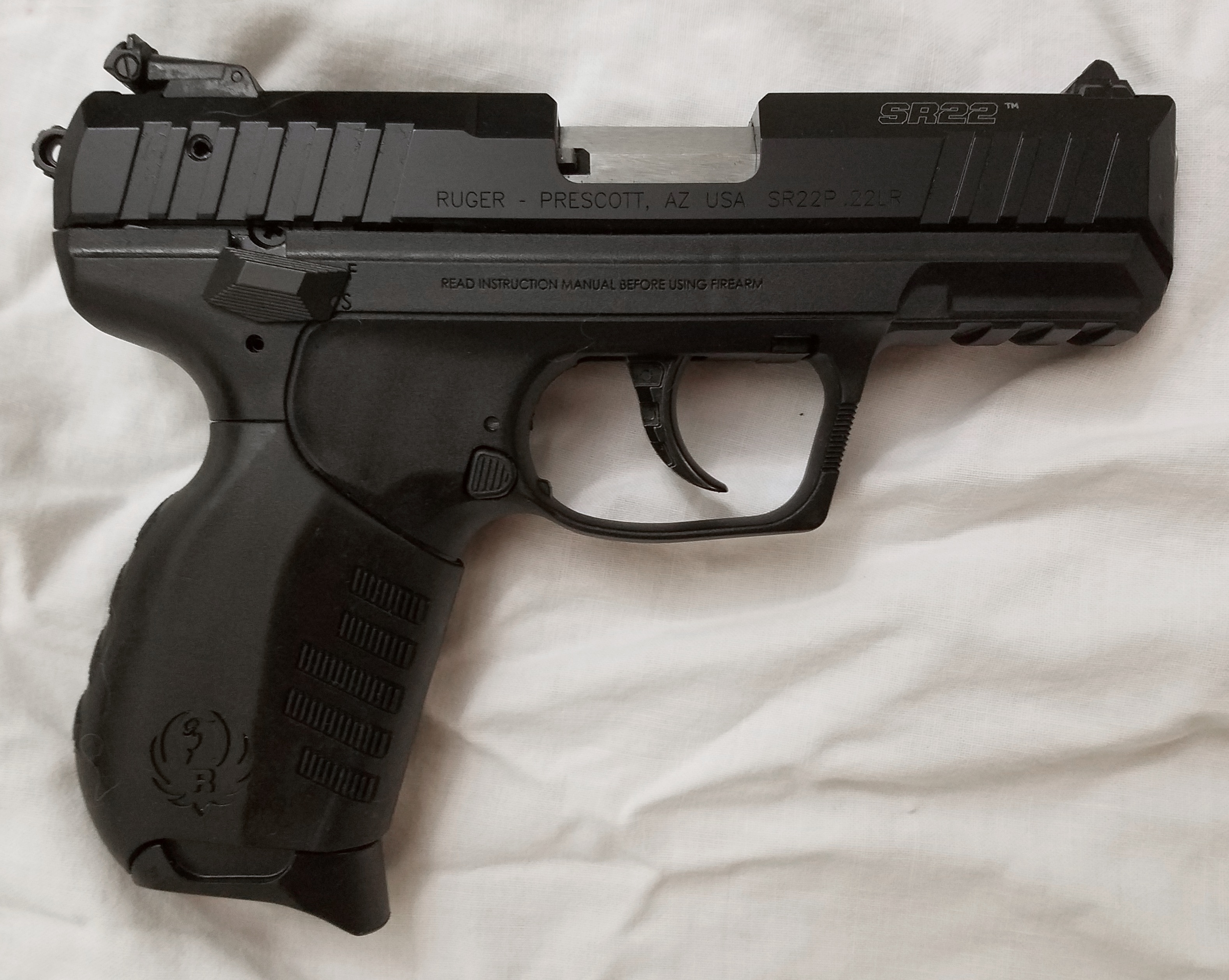
- Type: Semi-automatic pistol
- Place of origin: United States

Production history
- Manufacturer: Ruger
- Produced: January 2012–2026

Specifications
- Mass: 17.5 oz (496.1 g)
- Length: 6.40 in (162.6 mm)
- Barrel length: 3.50 in (88.9 mm)
- Width: 1.29 in (32.8 mm)
- Height: 4.90 in (124.5 mm)
- Cartridge: .22 LR
- Action: Blowback
- Feed system: 10-round detachable box magazine
- Sights: Adjustable three-dot iron sights

The Ruger SR22 or SR22P was a compact semi-automatic pistol manufactured by Sturm, Ruger & Co., chambered for the .22 Long Rifle rimfire cartridge. The SR22 is mainly targeted at plinking and competition shooting.

== Design ==
The SR22 does not share design and ergonomic commonalities with the striker-fired centerfire Ruger SR-Series pistols and mechanically deviates significantly. In fact, it is more similar to the Walther P22 than a Ruger SR-Series pistol. The SR22 comes only in compact size, although recently a 4.5-inch (11 cm) barrel version (Model 3620) was released.

The SR22 has a straight blowback-type action, and features a stainless steel barrel that is fixed to the frame. Furthermore, the SR22 features a double-action/single-action trigger system with a rounded-spur external hammer, and has a visual inspection port in the form of a hole in the top of the slide and the back of the barrel that functions as a loaded chamber indicator. The pistol is very lightweight thanks to its aluminum slide and polymer frame, and also comes with interchangeable rubber grips for different-sized hands. The SR22 started to ship in January 2012 and is shipped with two single-stack 10-round magazines and replaceable grips for small or large hands.

The Ruger SR22 is equipped standard with an ambidextrous thumb safety/decocking lever, and magazine release. Two interchangeable handgrips are offered. One in slim, and the other in wide-palmswell format. It is also equipped with a Picatinny rail on the frame below the barrel and in front of the trigger guard.

== Models ==
Note that this list may not include all models.

Model#	Name	Slide/Frame & Description	Distributor Exclusive	Announced	MSRP
3600	SR22	Black/Black Standard model.	-		$439.00
3607	SR22 Silver	Silver/Black.	-		$469.00
3620	SR22 4.5"	Black/Black with a 1" longer barrel & slide.	-		$459.00
3604	SR22 Threaded	Black/Black with threaded barrel, thread adapter & adapter wrench.	-		$479.00
3611	SR22 Black Talo	Black/Black with blued barrel and three magazines.	Talo		
3622	SR22 Red Titanium Threaded	Black/Red Titanium Cerakote with threaded Barrel.	Bangers		
3608	SR22 Raspberry	Black/Raspberry.	?		
3606	SR22 Lady Lilac	Black/Lady Lilac (Purple).	Talo		
3630	SR22 Savage Silver	Savage Silver Cerakote/Savage Silver Cerakote.	Sports South		
3625	SR22 Turquoise	Black/Turquoise Cerakote.	Talo		
3629	SR22 Farmer Green	Black/Farmer Green.	Zanders Sporting Goods		
3624	SR22 Contractor Yellow	Black/Contractor Yellow Cerakote.	Talo		
3613	SR22 FDE	Black/FDE	Bangers		
3641	SR22 Elite Earth/Jungle Green	Jungle Green Cerakote/Elite Earth Cerakote.	Talo		
3633	SR22 Toxic Camo	Black/Reduced Moon Shine Camo Toxic.	-		$479.00
3637	SR22 Harvest Moon Camo	Black/Reduced Moon Shine Camo Harvest Moon.	-		$479.00
3635	SR22 Undertow Camo	Black/Reduced Moon Shine Camo Undertow.	Talo		
3636	SR22 Undertow Camo Silver	Silver/Reduced Moon Shine Camo Undertow.	Gallery of Guns		
3601	SR22 CT Laser	Black/Black with Crimson Trace laser.	?		
3603	SR22 CT Light	Black/Black with Crimson Trace light.	?		
3615	SR22 LaserMax	Black/Black with LaserMax laser (with built in rail).	?		
3621	SR22 Blue Titanium	Black/Blue Titanium Cerakote.	?		
3627	SR22 Tungsten	Black/Tungsten Cerakote.	?		
3657	SR22 - CA Approved	Black	-		$559.00
