= Murder of the Stay family =

2014 murder of a family in Texas, U.S.

- Location: 30.0409°N 95.4421°W; Near Spring, Texas, U.S.
- Date: July 9, 2014; 12 years ago (CDT; UTC−05:00)
- Target: Relatives of ex-wife (divorced)
- Attack type: Mass shooting; mass murder; domestic dispute; familicide
- Weapon: 9mm Springfield Armory XD semi-automatic pistol
- Deaths: 6
- Injuries: 1
- Perpetrator: Ronald Lee Haskell
- No. of participants: 1
- Motive: Apparent domestic dispute
- Verdict: Guilty of murders; sentenced to death in 2019
- Convictions: Capital murder (6 counts)

On July 9, 2014, a mass shooting occurred in a home located in northern Harris County, Texas, near Spring, a suburban area of the Greater Houston area, leaving six family members dead, including four children, and one survivor. Ronald Lee Haskell, 34, was apprehended after a standoff that lasted several hours. Haskell was related to the victims via his ex-wife.

== Events ==
Police and court documents state that Haskell arrived at the residence, 711 Leaflet Lane, dressed as a FedEx employee. The house is in the Enchanted Oaks subdivision Section 3, in an unincorporated area outside of the Spring census-designated place but with a Spring postal address. Haskell was reportedly searching for his ex-wife, the sister of the mother living in the home. The door was answered by the mother's 15-year-old daughter, who initially did not recognize him; he asked for her parents and she told him they weren't home. Haskell left, but returned a short time later and told the girl he was her ex-uncle. When she tried to close the door on him, Haskell forced his way inside, tied her up, and made her lie face-down; Haskell did the same to the other four children and their parents when they returned to the house. Haskell then reportedly shot all seven people in the back of the head "execution-style" when they would not tell him where his ex-wife was. Afterwards, he fled the scene using the family's car. He discharged his pistol inside the house a total of 13 times.

Five of the victims died at the scene, while one child died shortly after arriving at a hospital. The lone survivor was 15-year-old Cassidy, who initially answered the door and was able to identify the suspect. She told responding police that the gunman was planning on going after other family members. She survived being shot by raising her hand - the bullet grazed her head and finger causing a skull fracture and damaging the tip of her finger, after which she "played dead."

Using Cassidy's information, police confronted Haskell at a second home; a chase ensued for twenty minutes, involving about two dozen patrol cars and eventually ending at a cul-de-sac located about three miles from the scene of the shooting shortly before 7:00 p.m. The police managed to disable the Haskell's car with a spike strip, corner him at the cul-de-sac, and block his car with two armored vehicles. Haskell held a pistol to his head and spoke to police via cellphone. Nearby homes were evacuated during the standoff. After around three hours passed, Haskell surrendered to police without further incident.

=== Victims ===
The six slain victims included 39-year-old Stephen Robert Stay, his wife, 33-year-old Katie Stay, and four of their children: Bryan, 13; Emily, 9; Rebecca, 6; and Zachary, 4. The family arrived in the Houston area in 2012 after living in California, and the husband operated a real estate business. Two of the victims were pupils at Lemm Elementary School in Enchanted Oaks, and the oldest deceased child attended Schindewolf Intermediate School in Harris County.

The sole survivor was 15-year-old Cassidy Stay, a student at Klein Collins High School, who was able to phone police and inform them that Haskell was planning to attack her grandparents next. She was released from the hospital on July 11.

Cassidy Stay's survival of the shooting and her participation in Haskell's apprehension have earned her praise from the public. An online fundraiser campaign for her on GoFundMe received more than 16,000 participants and over $406,000 in donations.

== Perpetrator ==
Ronald Lee Haskell Jr. (born August 26, 1980) was identified by police as the sole suspect in the shooting. He was raised in San Marcos, California, and also lived in Eagle River, Alaska, until 2004. In Alaska, he attended Chugiak High School, graduating in 1999. He had been voted as the class clown and king for both prom and homecoming. He worked as a parcel delivery driver for an independent service that had a contract with FedEx, but he stopped working for the company in January, according to a spokesperson. He married Melannie Kaye Lyon on March 15, 2002, in Orange County, California. He moved to Logan, Utah, where he lived from July 2006 to November 2013, mostly with his then-wife. Melannie Lyon later divorced him on February 14, 2014, and moved to Houston with the help of her sister, Katie Stay, who was one of the victims. Previously, the Stays were familiar with the Haskells, since both families belonged to a tight-knit church community in southern California.

Haskell had previously faced domestic assault charges and had a protective order put against him by his wife before they divorced. In June 2008, Haskell was charged with suspicion of domestic violence, simple assault, and committing an act of violence in front of children, after reportedly dragging his wife out of bed by the hair and hitting her on the side of her head. Haskell said he had only pushed his wife. He later pleaded guilty to the simple assault charge, and not guilty to the domestic violence charge; the charges were later dismissed after a plea deal was reached. On July 8, 2013, a protective order was filed by Melannie Lyon and served the following day. Melannie Lyon filed for divorce in August. The protective order was later dismissed in October 2013 when the Haskells agreed to a mutual restraining order in the divorce and custody arrangements involving their four children, with Melannie Lyon gaining primary custody. He had been living with his parents in San Marcos, California, since the divorce; police later stated that Haskell was found holding a California driver's license.

On July 2, 2014, over a week prior to the shooting, Haskell's mother, Karla Jeanne Haskell, told San Marcos police that she wanted a restraining order against her son after having "a ferocious argument" with him, during which he reportedly forced her into the garage, tied her wrists with duct tape, taped her to a computer chair for almost four hours, and threatened to kill her and his entire family. The incident was allegedly sparked when Karla Haskell told him that she was in contact with his ex-wife. Deputies investigating the incident searched for Haskell but were unable to find him. They would later learn that Haskell had been arrested in Texas for the shooting.

== Legal proceedings ==
On the morning of July 10, 2014, Haskell was charged with six counts of capital murder, according to the Harris County Sheriff's Office. He was held without bond, and made his first court appearance on July 11. In court, as the charges against him were read, he began shaking and later collapsed for reasons that are still unclear. When deputies lifted him to his feet, Haskell stood for a minute, then collapsed again. As a result, he had to be removed from the courtroom in a wheelchair. He made reappearances in court on September 30 and December 2, 2014 and January 21, 2015.

On August 26, 2016, Haskell was expected back in court and was then expected to stand trial in the fall of 2017, and face the death penalty. Haskell's trial commenced in August 2019.

On September 26 of that year, Haskell was found guilty of capital murder and was sentenced to death by lethal injection on October 11. He is currently on death row at the Allan B. Polunsky Unit near Livingston, awaiting execution.

== Aftermath ==
The funeral for the deceased was held at the Hafer Road chapel of the Church of Jesus Christ of Latter-day Saints, and a memorial service was held at Lemm Elementary, both in July of 2014.

== See also ==
- 2015 Harris County shooting, a shooting that occurred in northern Harris County
- List of death row inmates in the United States § Texas
