= Daingerfield church shooting =

Mass shooting in Texas in 1980

- Location: 33.03110°N 94.72327°W; Daingerfield, Texas, United States
- Date: June 22, 1980
- Target: Congregants of First Baptist Church
- Attack type: Mass murder, mass shooting, hate crime
- Weapons: Colt AR-15 SP1 semi-automatic rifle with telescopic sight and bayonet; Röhm RG-10 .22-caliber revolver; Smith & Wesson Model 10 .38-caliber revolver (unused); M1 carbine with bayonet (unused)
- Deaths: 5
- Injuries: 11 (including the perpetrator)
- Perpetrator: Alvin Lee King III
- Motive: Revenge against church-goers for not testifying against trial

The Daingerfield church shooting was a mass murder that occurred at the First Baptist Church in Daingerfield, Texas, United States on June 22, 1980. Alvin Lee King III, 45, a former high school teacher, armed with an M1 carbine, two revolvers, and a scoped Colt AR-15 SP1 rifle, killed five people and wounded 10 others, after members of the church had declined his request to appear as character witnesses in a trial in which he was charged with raping his daughter. King was arrested after shooting himself and charged with five counts of murder, and ten counts of attempted murder, but committed suicide in his prison cell on January 19, 1982, before he could be tried.

== Victims ==
- Gene Gandy, 49
- Mary Regina "Gina" Linam, 7
- James Young "Red" McDaniel, 53
- Thelma May Richardson, 72
- Kenneth Alton Truitt, 49

Additionally, Arthur Greaves, 69, Robert Jack Dean, 56, and Laverne McDaniel were injured during the shooting.

== In popular culture ==
Faith Under Fire (2012) - documentary film

Law & Order, Season 1, Episode 18 - "The Secret Sharers" (1991)

Linam, Larry (2010). The Day the Angels Cried. AuthorHouse. ISBN 978-1449056865.

== See also ==
- List of shootings in Texas
- Sutherland Springs church shooting
