= 2024 Lakewood Church shooting =

Shooting attack in Texas, U.S.

Coordinates: 29.7294°N 95.4348°W

Lakewood Church shooting
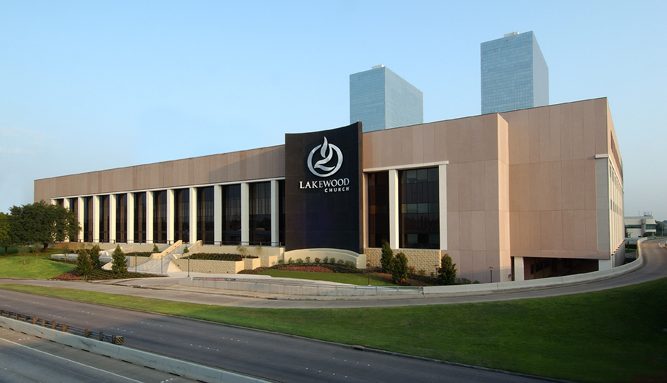
- Lakewood Church in 2005
- Location: Lakewood Church; Houston, Texas, U.S.
- Date: February 11, 2024 c. 1:53 p.m. (CST; UTC−06:00)
- Attack type: Shooting
- Weapons: .223-caliber Anderson Manufacturing AM-15 semi-automatic rifle; Blue Line Solutions .22-caliber rifle (unused)
- Deaths: 1 (the perpetrator)
- Injuries: 2
- Perpetrator: Genesse Ivonne Moreno

On February 11, 2024, a shooting occurred at Lakewood Church in Houston, Texas, United States. Two people were injured before the perpetrator, 36-year-old Genesse Moreno, was killed by intervening church security during a shootout.

== Shooting ==
Witnesses at Lakewood Church stated that they heard multiple shots fired around 2:00 pm CST, the start time of the Spanish-language services.

The shooter, Genesse Moreno, claimed to have a bomb in her backpack, but no bomb was subsequently found. She also sprayed "some type of substance on the ground". She shot a 47-year-old man in the leg, wounding him. Moreno said "Stay calm, all I need is help," then proceeded to fire more rounds. Two off-duty officers, serving as security at the church, killed Moreno after she pointed an AR-15 at them. Moreno's seven-year-old son was shot in the exchange of gunfire. The child was taken to the Texas Children's Hospital in critical condition. Moreno was shot and killed four minutes after entering the church. The Federal Bureau of Investigation says she fired around 30 shots during the shooting.

Reports of a second shooter caused some alarm among Houston residents, leading the police to evacuate businesses in the commercial district. Police confirmed that there was no second shooter. Camera footage from body cameras and surveillance cameras was released by the police.

== Victims ==
The wounded 47-year-old man was released from the hospital by February 12. The seven-year-old had a portion of the frontal lobe of his brain surgically removed, and had his breathing tube removed after 13 days. His grandmother Rabbi Walli Carranza urged people to "demand that no one's second amendment rights overtake an innocent child's inherent right to life". After being released from the hospital, the boy lived with his paternal grandmother until her death the following year.

== Perpetrator ==
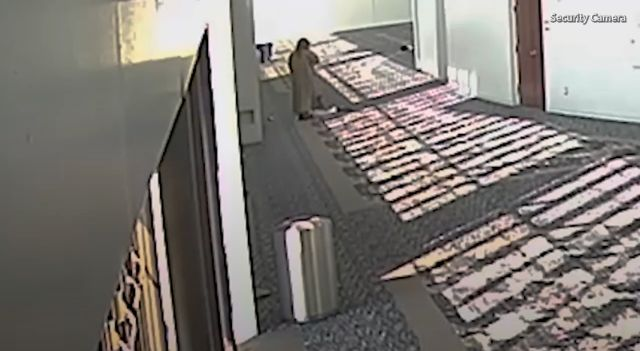
The perpetrator during the shooting

Police confirmed the following day that they identified the shooter as 36-year-old Genesse Ivonne Moreno (August 21, 1987 – February 11, 2024). Moreno was raised in Conroe, Texas, and had both a criminal record and documented mental health issues. Walli Carranza, her ex-mother-in-law, said that she had schizophrenia that caused her to become violent and claimed that "What was needed for years was a collaborative mental health and law enforcement response". Moreno legally obtained her weapon in December 2023; Carranza criticized the lack of a red flag law in Texas.

Moreno was previously known to Child Protective Services for failing to enroll her son at pre-school and keeping a loaded handgun in a diaper bag. In August 2021, Moreno divorced Carranza's son Enrique, which led to a custody dispute over their son. Enrique Carranza was first given custody, but the decision was reversed due to Enrique's status as a registered sex offender. The Carranzas subsequently accused Moreno and her mother of regularly moving without informing them to keep the child away from his father and that Moreno had subjected Enrique to physical abuse during the marriage. Moreno had sought support from the Lakewood Church during court proceedings. Carranza unsuccessfully petitioned for conservatorship of Moreno's son, the injured child, in 2022.

As of February 19, 2024, no motive is known. Police confirmed that Moreno's AR-15–style rifle had a "Palestine" sticker on it and claimed that antisemitic writings had been discovered. According to the Anti-Defamation League, Moreno had made multiple comments propagating anti-semitic conspiracy theories, praising Osama bin Laden, and promoting terrorist organizations.

Moreno previously used the alias Jeffery Escalante; although she at no point was identified as anything other than a cisgender female, her use of this alias caused far-right commentators, including Libs of TikTok and Fox News, to spread misinformation claiming that the shooter was a transgender woman. Fox News later edited its article to remove the claim. Republican politicians, including Ted Cruz, Donald Trump Jr., Marjorie Taylor Greene, and Josh Hawley promoted the claim. This continued an ongoing trend of conservative commentators claiming that the LGBT community is to blame for the increasing gun violence in America. However, this claim is contradicted by statistics which show trans people are far more likely to be victims than perpetrators of violence.

== Responses ==
Lakewood Church asked people to "pray for Lakewood and our community". Joel Osteen, its pastor, said: "Of course, we're devastated. We don't understand why these things happen. We're going to pray for the 5-year-old little boy, the lady who is deceased and the other gentleman. We're going to stay strong and continue to move forward. We don’t understand why these things happen."
