= Sutherland Springs church shooting =

2017 mass shooting in Texas, U.S.

- Map of church and crash site
- Location: 29.2732°N 98.0564°W; First Baptist Church in Sutherland Springs, Texas; 29.415832°N 98.061930°W; Car crash site in New Berlin, Texas
- Date: November 5, 2017; 9 years ago c. 11:20 – c. 11:31 a.m. (CST; UTC−06:00)
- Attack type: Mass shooting; mass murder; murder–suicide; pedicide; shootout
- Weapons: Perpetrator: 5.56 Ruger AR-556 semi-automatic rifle; 9mm Glock 19 semi-automatic pistol; .22 caliber Ruger SR22 semi-automatic pistol; Defender: AR-15 semi-automatic rifle
- Deaths: 27 (including the perpetrator and 1 unborn child)
- Injuries: 22
- Perpetrator: Devin Patrick Kelley
- Defenders: Stephen Willeford (armed defender); Johnnie Langendorff (pursuer)
- Motive: Domestic dispute

On November 5, 2017, 26-year-old Devin Patrick Kelley shot and killed 26 people and wounded 22 others, including an unborn child, at the First Baptist Church in Sutherland Springs, Texas, United States. Kelley was subsequently shot and wounded, and drove away from the church. While being chased, Kelley killed himself with a gunshot to the head. The shooting is the deadliest mass shooting in Texas history and the deadliest at an American place of worship, surpassing the Charleston church shooting of 2015 and the Waddell Buddhist temple shooting of 1991.

In 2021, a federal judge ruled that the federal government was negligent and awarded victims and families nearly a quarter-billion dollars. The 26-year-old Kelley should not have been allowed to purchase or possess firearms and ammunition because of a prior domestic violence conviction in a court-martial while in the United States Air Force; however, he was still able to buy the weapons because the Air Force did not report the conviction. In response, Congress passed new legislation that addressed gaps in background check reporting procedures.

== Shooting ==
A few minutes after 11:00 a.m., Kelley arrived in a white SUV at the First Baptist Church in Sutherland Springs. Around 11:20 a.m., Kelley stepped out of the SUV, wearing black tactical gear, a ballistic vest, and a black face-mask featuring a white skull, and wielding a Ruger AR-556 semi-automatic rifle. He approached the church and began shooting. He killed two people while shooting at the building itself. He then entered the sanctuary through a door where worshippers were attending regular Sunday service.

After entering, Kelley yelled, "Everybody dies, motherfuckers!" as he proceeded up and down the center aisle and shot at people in the pews. Police found Kelley's body was equipped with 15 magazines capable of holding 30 rounds each, indicating Kelley held a maximum of 450 rounds. Authorities stated Kelley fired approximately 196 rounds inside the sanctuary during the estimated 11-minute incident.

According to investigators, the shooting was captured on a camera set up at the back of the church to record regular services for uploading online. The footage shows Kelley methodically shooting the victims, pausing only to reload his rifle.

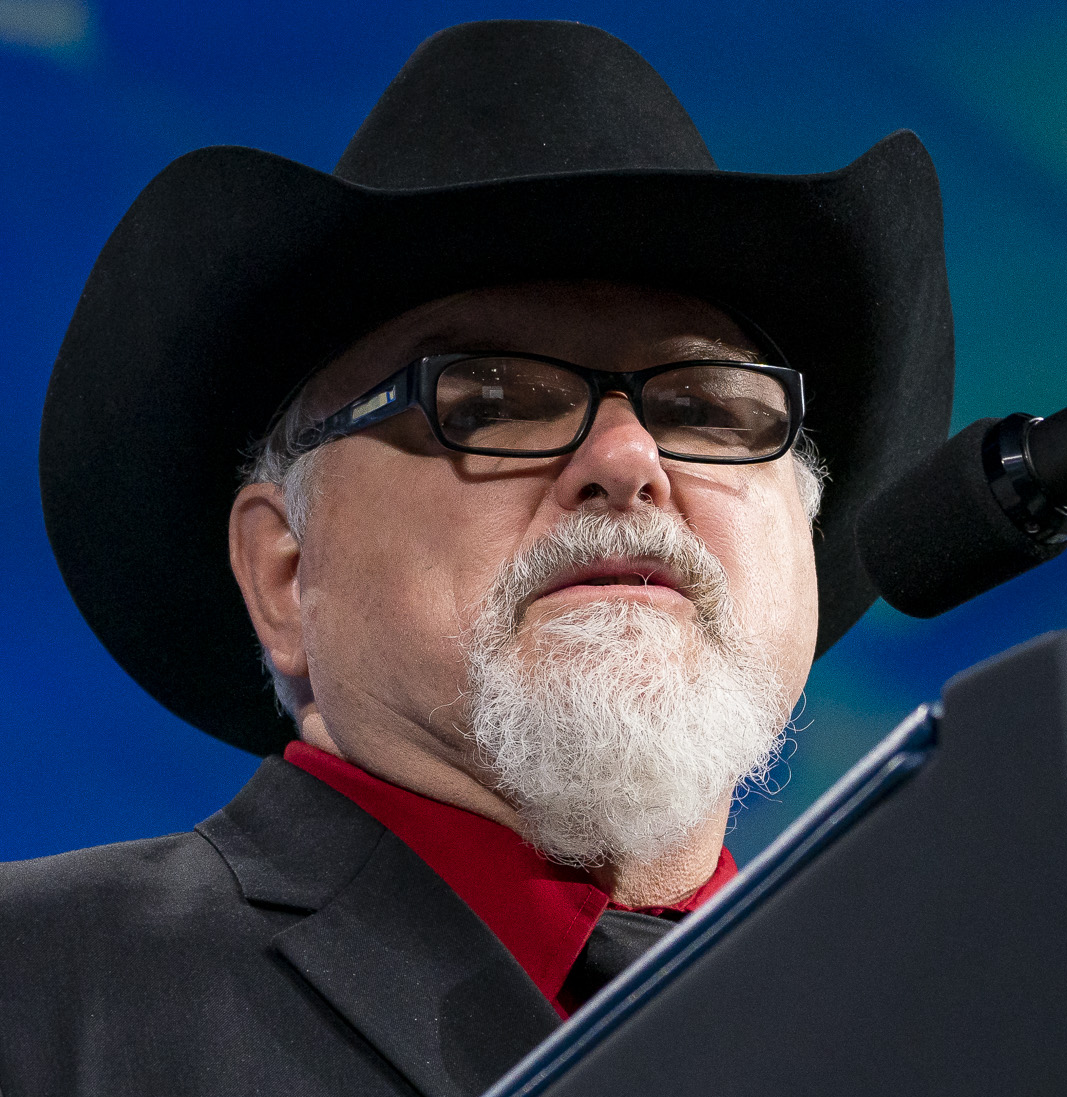
Stephen Willeford, former firearms instructor who fired upon and injured the shooter forcing him to flee.

Kelley was then confronted by and traded fire with Stephen Willeford, a local resident and former firearms instructor who was armed with an AR-15 semi-automatic rifle. Willeford had taken cover behind a truck across the street from the church and shot Kelley twice, once in the leg and once in the upper left torso under his tactical gear. Kelley, who had dropped his rifle during the initial firefight with Willeford, shot back with a handgun before fleeing in his Ford Explorer. Willeford fired one more round as Kelley sped north on FM 539. Willeford then noticed a pickup truck pulled up to the intersection of 4th St. and FM 539, driven by Johnnie Langendorff.

Willeford approached and entered Langendorff's truck on the passenger side. They then pursued Kelley at high speed for about five to seven minutes. According to Langendorff, they drove at speeds up to 95 miles per hour (155 km/h). While chasing Kelley, the men called police dispatch to report the route and direction of the chase assuming the police were headed toward the church.

During the chase, Kelley called his wife and spoke to her and his parents, informing them "I just shot up the Sutherland Springs church", and telling his father that he was injured and thought that he would not survive. Kelley reportedly repeatedly emphasized how sorry he was. Bleeding from his injuries, Kelley soon lost control of his vehicle, and collided with a road sign before crossing a bar ditch at the Hartfield/Sandy Elm Road intersection and stopping about 30 feet into an empty field.

Willeford and Langendorff observed Kelley was motionless, and police took over the scene when they arrived. Police found Kelley dead in his car with three gunshot wounds, including a self-inflicted head wound. Two handguns were found in the vehicle: a Glock 19 9mm and a Ruger SR22 .22-caliber, both of which Kelley had purchased.

== Victims ==
The attack occurred during the church's Sunday service. Twenty-six people were killed and 22 others were injured. The dead comprised ten women, seven men, six girls, two boys, and an unborn child. Twenty-three died inside the church, two outside, and one in a hospital. The oldest victim was 77 years old. One victim was the 14-year-old daughter of church pastor Frank Pomeroy, who had not been at the church on the day of the attack. Visiting pastor Bryan Holcombe died with eight family members, including an unborn grandchild.

The injured victims were taken to Connally Memorial Medical Center in Floresville, University Hospital in San Antonio, and Brooke Army Medical Center at Fort Sam Houston.

One of the wounded victims, Kris Workman, was shot twice and paralyzed from the waist down.

== Investigation ==
The Texas Rangers led the investigation, with assistance from the FBI and the Bureau of Alcohol, Tobacco, Firearms and Explosives (ATF). Investigators initially said the shooting was not racially or religiously motivated, rather by a dispute with Kelley's mother-in-law who occasionally attended the church but was not present during the shootings. There was no indication that anyone other than Kelley was involved in the shooting.

== Perpetrator ==
Devin Kelley, pictured in a driver’s license photo

Devin Patrick Kelley (February 12, 1991 – November 5, 2017) was raised in New Braunfels, Texas, about 35 miles (56 km) from Sutherland Springs, and attended New Braunfels High School.

At New Braunfels High School, Kelley had a lengthy disciplinary record, which included seven suspensions for "falsifying records, insubordination, profanity and a drug-related offense". One former high school classmate described him as "an outcast but not a loner" who was "popular among other outcasts". However, a martial arts instructor who taught Kelley during that time said Kelley signed up for his class because he was being bullied and that he did not fit in. Kelley graduated in 2009 with a 2.32 grade-point average and a ranking of 260 out of 393 students in his class. A close friend from middle school through high school recalled "he wasn't always a 'psychopath' though" and that "over the years we all saw him change into something that he wasn't".

=== Military service and violent behavior ===
After graduating, Kelley enlisted in the United States Air Force. He was initially slated to become a fusion analyst, but washed out before graduating intelligence technical school. In 2011, he was assigned to logistics readiness at Holloman Air Force Base in New Mexico. He married in April of that year. By 2012, his work was so slovenly that his chain of command was amassing a paper trail that would justify discharging him for performance reasons.

In October 2012, he was charged with assaulting his wife and fracturing his toddler stepson's skull. In response, Kelley made death threats against the superior officers who charged him, and he was caught sneaking firearms onto Holloman Air Force Base. Around that same time, he made threats of self-harm to a coworker. He was then admitted to Peak Behavioral Health Services, a mental health facility in Santa Teresa, New Mexico. In June 2012, Kelley escaped from Peak Behavioral Health Services but was soon apprehended ten miles away at a bus terminal in El Paso, Texas. The facility's director of military affairs later recalled that Kelley had stayed at the facility for several weeks, until he was brought to court-martial. While there, he had expressed a desire for "some kind of retribution to his chain of command" and was discovered to have used computers to order "weapons and tactical gear to a P.O. box in San Antonio".

Kelley and his wife divorced in October 2012. In an interview with Inside Edition, his ex-wife said she lived in constant fear of him, as their marriage was filled with abuse. He once threatened her at gunpoint over a speeding ticket, and later threatened to kill her and her entire family.

Kelley was brought before a general court-martial on four charges: assault on his wife, aggravated assault on his stepson, two charges of pointing a loaded gun at his wife, and two counts of threatening his wife with an unloaded gun. In November 2012, Kelley pleaded guilty to two counts of Article 128 UCMJ, for the assault of his wife and stepson. In return, the weapons charges were dropped. He was sentenced to 12 months of confinement and a reduction in rank to airman basic. He appealed to the U.S. Court of Appeals for the Armed Forces, but was unsuccessful. In 2014, he was dismissed from the Air Force with a bad conduct discharge.

=== Relationships ===
After his release, Kelley returned to New Braunfels, where he lived in a converted barn at his parents' home. Shortly thereafter, he was investigated for sexual assault and rape, and for a physical assault of his then-girlfriend. A 2013 statement from the woman who accused Kelley of sexual assault detailed an alleged attack on her. A separate statement from Kelley's first wife (who divorced him in October 2012) said that Kelley had physically abused her during the marriage; the woman wrote, "For a whole year, he slapped me, choked me, kicked me, water-boarded me and held a gun to my head." However, the Comal County, Texas, Sheriff's Office did not bring charges against Kelley, and "the case became inactive because the victim did not respond to four follow-up calls and messages from a sheriff's office detective."

On April 4, 2014, Kelley married his then-girlfriend. The couple moved into a mobile home in Colorado Springs, Colorado, where he was charged in August 2014 for misdemeanor cruelty to animals after beating his malnourished husky. He was given a deferred sentence of probation and was ordered to pay restitution and other fees; the charge was dismissed in March 2016, after he completed the sentence. In January 2015, a resident of El Paso County, Colorado, was granted a protection order against him.

At the time of the shooting, Kelley was again living at his parents' property in New Braunfels. He reportedly lied about his background to pass a background check and obtain a license from the Texas Department of Public Safety as a security guard, and was a security worker at the Summit Vacation and RV Resort in New Braunfels. He had previously worked as an unarmed security guard at the Schlitterbahn Waterpark and Resort in New Braunfels, but was fired after less than six weeks on the job. While he was working at The Summit Vacation and RV Resort, a family who encountered him commented on how "creepy" Kelley had seemed; one member described, "He seemed angry. He seemed annoyed by us, and he seemed like he wanted to exert some authority."

On the night of October 31, less than a week before the shooting, Kelley attended a festival at the First Baptist Church wearing all black. According to two parishioners who were friends of his in-laws, he acted so strangely that people "kept a close eye on him." One of the two parishioners, a former law enforcement officer, closely examined Kelley to make sure he was not carrying a firearm. According to a former Air Force colleague who temporarily got reacquainted with him online, Kelley claimed he would buy dogs and other animals and use them for "target practice". He also expressed his obsession with mass murders, including the Charleston church shooting, and joked about committing one himself. These comments prompted her to block him on Facebook.

Kelley's estranged second wife sometimes attended First Baptist Church in Sutherland Springs with her family. Prior to the shooting, he sent threatening text messages to her mother. His wife and her mother were not at the church when the attack occurred, but he killed his wife's grandmother at the church.

=== Anti-religious sentiments ===
Kelley attended the First Baptist Church in Kingsville, Texas, from May to June 2014 and volunteered as a helper for one day of Vacation Bible School. Later on, he stopped volunteering at the summer Bible class and became vocally anti-Christian, posting about atheism online. In social media posts, Kelley often tried to preach his atheism, described people who believe in God as "stupid" (his posts and online hate speech causing numerous former classmates to delete him as a friend on Facebook) and expressed an interest in church shootings.

=== Ability to purchase and carry firearms ===
In 2012, Kelley purchased two guns (a European American Armory Windicator .38-caliber revolver and a 9mm SIG Sauer P250 pistol) from the HAFB Base Exchange.

Kelley later purchased four guns, including a 9mm Glock 19 pistol, a .22-caliber Ruger SR22 pistol, a Ruger GP100 .357 Magnum revolver and a Ruger AR-556 rifle, at stores in Colorado and Texas between 2014 and 2017. On October 29, a week before the shooting, he posted a photo of what appeared to be a Ruger model AR-556 rifle on his Facebook profile. A Ruger AR-556 rifle was used in the attack, and two handguns were found in Kelley's vehicle.

Kelley purchased the semi-automatic rifle used in the shooting from an Academy Sports + Outdoors store in San Antonio on April 7, 2016. He filled out the required ATF Form 4473 and falsely indicated that he did not have a disqualifying criminal history. In Texas, an FBI National Instant Criminal Background Check System (NICS) check is required at the time of purchase for all firearms except for purchasers with a valid license to carry a handgun.

The State of Texas denied his application for a license to carry a handgun. No license of any kind is required to purchase firearms under Texas state law.

Kelley's general court-martial guilty plea should have made it illegal for him to own, buy, or possess a firearm or ammunition. The conviction should have been flagged by NICS and prevented the purchase. Federal law prohibits those convicted of domestic violence—even if it is only a misdemeanor—from possessing firearms.

However, the Air Force failed to relay the court-martial convictions to the FBI. In a statement admitting the oversight, the Air Force said, "Initial information indicates that Kelley's domestic violence offense was not entered into the National Crime Information Center (NCIC) database by the Holloman Air Force Base Office of Special Investigations." One day after the shooting, the Air Force said it had "launched a review of how the service handled the criminal records of former Airman Devin P. Kelley following his 2012 domestic violence conviction". Three days after the shooting, Vice President Mike Pence visited the crime scene, and said, "We will find why this information was not properly recorded in 2012, and we will work with leaders in Congress to ensure that this never happens again."

== Aftermath ==
=== Lawsuits ===
In 2018, the family of a couple who were murdered in the shooting filed a lawsuit in the U.S. District Court for the Western District of Texas against the U.S. Air Force and the Department of Defense, alleging they were negligent in reporting Kelley's criminal history, which would have prevented him from purchasing firearms. In 2021, U.S. district judge Xavier Rodriguez ruled that the federal government's negligence was mostly responsible for the shooting and that it was "jointly and severally liable for the damages that may be awarded." He later awarded damages of more than USD $230 million "to survivors and victims’ families".

=== Legislation ===
The shooting brought attention to gaps in reporting to the federal background-check system intended to ban convicted domestic abusers, such as Kelley, from purchasing guns. Since 1996, the Lautenberg Amendment has prohibited the sale of firearms to those convicted of domestic abuse offenses, even misdemeanors, but gaps in reporting continue to exist.

On November 15, 2017, the day nine victims of the shooting were buried, Senator John Cornyn (R-TX) introduced the Fix NICS Act of 2017 (S.2135), to address deficiencies in the reporting process, and impose severe penalties for the failure of agencies to report convictions. The next day, Congressman Henry Cuellar (D-TX), whose district, Texas 28th, includes Sutherland Springs, introduced a version in the House of Representatives (H. R. 4434). Cuellar's bill was superseded by H. R. 4477, introduced by Congressman John Culberson (R-TX), representing Texas' 7th District, including western Houston and Harris County. The final version of the Fix NICS ACT was passed as part of the Consolidated Appropriations Act, 2018, signed as Pub.L.115-141 by President Donald Trump on March 23, 2018. A week later, Cornyn met with survivors and victims' families at the First Baptist Church in Sutherland Springs to discuss details of the legislation. Between November 5, 2017, and March 30, 2018, the U. S. Air Force turned over at least 4,000 outstanding records to the FBI.

=== Church building ===
After the shooting, the building ceased to function as a church and was kept as a memorial to the victims. A new church about four times larger was built next door. Congregational authorities argued the old building was a painful reminder, and voted in 2021 to remove it. Some of the victim's families were against the idea, and they filed a lawsuit to stop the destruction. In July 2024, a judge issued a temporary restraining order to halt the demolition. However, another judge later denied a request to extend that order, setting in motion the demolition. On August 12, 2024, crews began dismantling the building. A member of the community, who was against the demolition, observed, "The devil got his way. That was God's house".

== Reactions ==
U.S. president Donald Trump discussing the shooting at a press conference in Tokyo, Japan

President Donald Trump said at a press conference while visiting Tokyo that "I think that mental health is a problem here. Based on preliminary reports, this was a very deranged individual with a lot of problems over a very long period of time. We have a lot of mental health problems in our country, as do other countries, but this isn't a guns situation ... we could go into it but it's a little bit soon to go into it. Fortunately somebody else had a gun that was shooting in the opposite direction, otherwise it wouldn’t have been as bad as it was, it would have been much worse". Trump was asked about gun policy while visiting Seoul, South Korea. In response to a proposal for extreme vetting of gun ownership, Trump said that this would have made "no difference". He said that stricter gun control measures might have prevented Stephen Willeford from shooting Kelley, and commented, "Instead of having 26 dead, he would've had hundreds more dead." After the shooting, Trump issued a presidential proclamation honoring the victims and ordered the United States flag at half-staff at the White House and all public and military sites until the sunset of November 9. Willeford was called a hero for what he did.

Texas Governor Greg Abbott said that the shooting "will be a long, suffering mourning for those in pain". Texas Attorney General Ken Paxton proposed that churches employ professional armed security guards, or at least arm more parishioners, to counter church shootings, which he said have happened "forever" and will again. Paxton was criticized by Manny Garcia, the Texas Democratic Party's deputy executive director, who said that "Texans deserve more from their chief law enforcement official."

=== Conspiracy theories and harassment of victims' families ===
Fake news websites and far-right agitators promoted misleading and deceptive stories along with conspiracy theories about the incident. They associated the shooter with a range of people and groups the far-right opposes such as identifying him as a Democrat, Hillary Clinton supporter, Bernie Sanders supporter, alt-left supporter, or radical Muslim; or claiming that he carried an antifa flag and told churchgoers, "This is a communist revolution!" Some reports falsely claimed that he targeted the church because they were "white conservatives". Democratic U.S. Representative Vicente González twice incorrectly named the shooter as Sam Hyde, a comedian who is often jokingly referred to as the perpetrator of various terrorist attacks and mass shootings on social media. González said that he had been given that name by officials.

Conspiracy theories circulated at the hospital where victims were being treated. According to The Washington Post, a group of women who said they knew the victims were overheard discussing the shooting as a false flag operation designed to manipulate the public towards some nefarious end. The Post reporter sought to inquire further, but the women pushed her away, saying, "She [the reporter] is part of it [the conspiracy]," after which the reporter was removed from the hospital by police. The misinformation mirrored similar conspiracy theories of the Las Vegas shooting a few weeks earlier, in which perpetrator Stephen Paddock was falsely linked to leftist and Islamist groups.

In 2018, two conspiracy theorists, Jodi Mann and Robert Ussery, were arrested after accosting the church's pastor, whose daughter was killed in the shooting. Both were charged with trespassing and resisting arrest, and Ussery was also charged with making a terroristic threat and possession of marijuana. Mann and Ussery deny that the massacre occurred and instead promote "false flag" conspiracy notions on the Internet, asserting that the Sutherland Springs attack and other attacks were orchestrated for political purposes.

== See also ==
- Anti-Christian sentiment
- List of attacks against houses of worship in the United States
- List of rampage killers in the United States
- List of shootings in Texas
- 2017 Las Vegas shooting - deadliest mass shooting in the United States which occurred one month earlier
- 2017 Plano shooting - occurred in Texas two months earlier
