= 2015 Harris County shooting =

Familicide in Texas, U.S.

- Location: 29.9198°N 95.4519°W; Harris County, Texas, U.S.
- Date: August 8, 2015; 11 years ago c. 10:30 a.m. – c. 9:00 p.m. (CDT; UTC−05:00)
- Attack type: Mass shooting; mass murder; familicide; pedicide; filicide; home invasion; shootout
- Weapon: 9mm semi-automatic pistol
- Deaths: 8
- Injuries: 0
- Perpetrator: David Ray Conley III
- Motive: Dispute with ex-girlfriend

On August 8, 2015, a mass shooting occurred inside a home in northern Harris County, Texas, United States, near Houston. David Ray Conley III, 48, broke into his former home and held hostage Valerie and Dwayne Jackson, Sr., along with six children, including his own 13-year-old son. Over the course of nine hours, he shot and killed the entire family. He then engaged in a shootout with responding police before surrendering.

== Shooting ==
At around 10:30 a.m., Conley reportedly arrived at a house in the 2200 block of Falling Oaks Road, in unincorporated northern Harris County, Texas, near Houston. This was the home of his former girlfriend, Valerie Jackson, where he had previously lived with her. As Jackson had changed the locks on the house, he entered through an unlocked window. He then confronted Jackson, her husband, and their six children with a 9mm handgun, forcing them to the master bedroom. There, he tied up some and handcuffed others to the bed. While Conley was distracted, Jackson was able to text her mother, saying she was being held at gunpoint by him. Afterwards, over the course of nine hours, he shot Jackson's husband and children in the back of the head, with Jackson being forced to witness everything. She was the last victim to be shot.

During the course of the shooting, police officers were sent to the home several times to perform welfare checks. The first occurred at 10:42 a.m., when dispatchers were notified by Jackson's mother. They knocked on the door and checked the house, but reported no response from the home an hour later. They returned to the home twice in the afternoon after being alerted by Jackson's siblings, but they never received any responses during both visits. It was not made clear if officers attempted to obtain a search warrant that would have allowed them to make a forced entry into the home.

At about 6:00 p.m., while performing a fourth welfare check, the officers obtained information that a man inside was wanted on a warrant. They then began circling the perimeter and spotted a dead body from a window. Four police officers forced their way into the home at around 8:00 p.m., which prompted the suspect to begin firing on them. The officers retreated and waited for backup to arrive; Conley surrendered an hour later.

Conley discharged his 9mm pistol at least 34 times during the shooting.

== Victims ==
Six children and two adults were killed in the shooting, all of them dying at the scene from gunshot wounds to the head. Some of them were shot multiple times. Initial reports indicated five children and three adults were killed. They were identified as:

- Valerie Ann Jackson (40)
- Dwayne Clifford Jackson, Sr. (50)
- Nathaniel Nicholas Conley (13)
- Honesty Faith Jackson (11)
- Dwayne Clifford Jackson, Jr. (10)
- Caleb Curtis Jackson (9)
- Trinity Hope Jackson (7)
- Jonah Curtis Jackson (6)

On August 17, a service for the victims was held at Fallbrook Church in northwest Houston and was attended by about 200 people.

== Perpetrator ==
David Ray Conley III (born December 29, 1966), age 48, was identified as the main suspect. He was reportedly a former boyfriend of Jackson, with whom he fathered Nathaniel Jackson, one of the slain children.

Prior to the shooting, Conley had an extensive criminal record dating as far back as 1988, including arrests for domestic violence, DUI, and drug possession. His latest charge was assault, relating to a July 28, 2015, incident where he allegedly bashed Valerie Jackson's head repeatedly against a refrigerator. The case was pending at the time of the shooting. He had previously been arrested and charged in 2000 and 2013 for being violent towards Jackson. Conley was said to have been physically abusive towards her and jealous of Dwayne Jackson. According to Valerie Jackson's brother, Earl Yanske, he suffered from bipolar disorder. At the time of the shooting, Conley had an estranged wife, Vernessa Conley, whom he was also abusive toward. According to his criminal history, Conley had a history of faking mental illnesses to get himself out of legal troubles.

=== Legal proceedings ===
Though he did not appear in court, Conley was charged with three counts of capital murder and had his bond denied. He was held in Harris County Jail. Prosecutors announced that they are likely seeking a death sentence. In February 2016, Conley's lawyer indicated they would seek a mental disability defense. On October 7, 2021, Conley was convicted in the shooting and was sentenced to life in prison without parole. The prosecution had dropped their pursuit of a death sentence after conceding that Conley was mentally disabled. He has been incarcerated at the W.J. Estelle Unit in Huntsville as of January 2025.

== Aftermath ==
Hours after the shooting, Conley was contacted by Jackson's brother, to whom he confessed to the familicide after being asked if he killed Jackson. However, during a jailhouse interview, he recanted his confession and then claimed he was "fed up" with how Valerie and Dwayne Jackson, Sr. were raising his son and their children, who he helped raise. He also claimed the entire family was being disrespectful towards him. Conley allegedly began preparations for the familicide sometime after noticing the children's behavior problems. He purchased the gun used in the shooting, three magazines of ammunition, and six handcuffs.

On September 28, Conley requested for a visit by New Black Panther Party leader Quanell X, which was granted. During the meeting, he reportedly confessed to Quanell X and shared details of the familicide to him. Quanell X allegedly became disgusted and cut the meeting short in anger.

== See also ==
- 2014 Harris County shooting, a shooting that occurred in northern Harris County, near Spring
