= List of mass shootings in the United States (2000–2009) =

Most notable mass shootings in the contiguous United States from 2000–2009
Most notable mass shootings in Puerto Rico from 2000–2009
Most notable mass shootings in the Northern Mariana Islands from 2000–2009

This is a list of the most notable mass shootings in the United States that have occurred between 2000 and 2009. Mass shootings are incidents involving several victims of firearm-related violence. The precise inclusion criteria are disputed, and there is no broadly accepted definition. Only shootings that have Wikipedia articles of their own are included in this list. Detailed lists of shootings can be found per-year at their respective pages.

The Gun Violence Archive, a nonprofit research group that tracks shootings and their characteristics in the United States, defines a mass shooting as an incident in which four or more people, excluding the perpetrator(s), are shot in one location at roughly the same time. The Congressional Research Service narrows that definition further, only considering what it defines as "public mass shootings", and only considering victims as those who are killed, excluding any victims who survive. The Washington Post and Mother Jones use similar definitions, with the latter acknowledging that their definition "is a conservative measure of the problem", as many rampages with fewer fatalities occur. The crowdsourced Mass Shooting Tracker project uses a definition even looser than the Gun Violence Archive's definition: four people shot in one incident regardless of the circumstances.

Larger documentation of mass shootings in the United States has occurred through independent and scholarly studies such as the Stanford University Mass Shootings in America Data Project.

== Definitions ==
There are varying definitions of a mass shooting. Listed roughly from most broad to most restrictive:

Stanford MSA Data Project: 3+ shot in one incident, at one location, at roughly the same time, excluding organized crime, as well as gang-related and drug-related shootings.
Mass Shooting Tracker: 4+ shot in one incident, at one location, at roughly the same time.
Gun Violence Archive/Vox: 4+ shot in one incident, excluding the perpetrator(s), at one location, at roughly the same time.
Mother Jones: 3+ shot and killed in one incident, excluding the perpetrator(s), at a public place, excluding gang-related killings.
The Washington Post: 4+ shot and killed in one incident, excluding the perpetrator(s), at a public place, excluding gang-related killings.
Congressional Research Service: 4+ shot and killed in one incident, excluding the perpetrator(s), at a public place, excluding gang-related killings, acts carried out that were inspired by criminal profit, and terrorism.

== List of mass shootings (2000–2009) ==
=== 2009 ===
Date	Location	Dead	Injured	Total	Description
November 29, 2009	Parkland, Washington	4	1 (Note: Including the perpetrator or suspect)	5	2009 Lakewood shooting: A man killed four police officers at a coffee shop and fled the scene with a gunshot wound. He was killed by police two days later.
November 26, 2009	Jupiter, Florida	4	1	5	2009 Thanksgiving murders: A man murdered four of his relatives, and was later arrested and sentenced to seven life terms.
November 20, 2009	Saipan, Northern Mariana Islands	5	9	14	2009 Saipan shootings: A gunman shot at people throughout Saipan, before committing suicide at the edge of a cliff.
November 12, 2009	Pearcy, Arkansas	5	0	5	Pearcy murders: Three men killed five people in two robberies on the same property.
November 5, 2009	Fort Hood, Texas	14 (Note: Including an unborn child)	33	47	2009 Fort Hood shooting: A U.S. army psychiatrist opened fire and killed thirteen individuals and injured 33 others.
October 17, 2009	Toa Baja, Puerto Rico	9	20	29	2009 Sabana Seca massacre: Eight people and an unborn child were killed and twenty others were wounded after multiple gunmen opened fire at a bar.
August 4, 2009	Collier Township, Pennsylvania	4	9	13	2009 Collier Township shooting: A man entered a women's aerobics class and opened fire, killing three people and injuring nine before committing suicide.
April 4, 2009	Pittsburgh, Pennsylvania	3	2	5	2009 shooting of Pittsburgh police officers: A man opened fire on police officers responding to a domestic violence 9-1-1 call, killing three and injuring one other by gunfire before he was arrested.
April 3, 2009	Binghamton, New York	14	4	18	2009 Binghamton shooting: A man shot and killed thirteen people at a civic center in Binghamton, New York before committing suicide.
March 29, 2009	Carthage, North Carolina	8	3	11	Carthage nursing home shooting: A man attacked the workplace of his estranged wife, killing eight people and wounding two others before being arrested.
March 21, 2009	Oakland, California	5	1	6	2009 shootings of Oakland police officers: A man shot and killed two officers of the Oakland Police Department during a traffic stop before fleeing to his sister's apartment. SWAT team officers would raid the apartment, injuring a young girl with a flash grenade before the gunman opened fire, killing two officers and injuring another before he was fatally wounded by the officers.
March 10, 2009	Geneva and Samson, Alabama	11	6	17	Geneva County shooting: A man fatally shot ten people and wounded six others in a shooting spree before committing suicide.

=== 2008 ===
Date	Location	Dead	Injured	Total	Description
December 24, 2008	Covina, California	10	2	12	Covina massacre: A man entered his former in-laws' home armed with four handguns and a homemade flamethrower. He killed nine people and injured two by gunfire before committing suicide.
September 2, 2008	Skagit County, Washington	6	3	8	2008 Skagit County shootings: A man killed six people and wounded three others by gunfire in several locations before being arrested by police.
July 27, 2008	Knoxville, Tennessee	2	6	8	2008 Knoxville church shooting: A former truck driver opened fired at a church during a church youth performance, killing two and wounding six before being restrained by churchgoers. A manifesto written by the gunman attributed the shooting to hatred of liberals, Democrats, African-Americans, and homosexuals.
June 25, 2008	Henderson, Kentucky	6	1	7	2008 Atlantis Plastics shooting: A plastic factory worker shot his superintendent and five co-workers before committing suicide.
March 2, 2008	Memphis, Tennessee	4	0	4	Lester Street Massacre: A man fatally shot his brother during an argument, before fatally shooting three witnesses and stabbing five children, two of whom died. Months before the attack, the perpetrator was released from prison after serving 14 years for second-degree murder.
February 14, 2008	DeKalb, Illinois	6	17	23	2008 Northern Illinois University shooting: A former graduate student entered a lecture hall and opened fire, killing five people and wounding seventeen by gunfire before committing suicide.
February 7, 2008	Kirkwood, Missouri	7	1	8	Kirkwood City Council shooting: A man opened fire during a public city council meeting, killing six people and injuring one other before being shot and killed by police.
February 2, 2008	Tinley Park, Illinois	5	1	6	Lane Bryant murders: Four customers and a manager were killed at a clothing store, and a part-time worker was injured in a robbery gone awry.
February 1, 2008	Cockeysville, Maryland	4	0	4	Browning family murders: A 15-year-old boy shot and killed his parents and two brothers at his family home.

=== 2007 ===
Date	Location	Dead	Injured	Total	Description
December 24, 2007	Carnation, Washington	6	0	6	2007 Carnation murders: A woman and her boyfriend killed the former's parents, brother, sister-in-law, niece, and nephew at the parent's home.
December 9, 2007	Arvada and Colorado Springs, Colorado	5	5	10	2007 Colorado YWAM and New Life shootings: A man stormed a dormitory at the Youth With A Mission organization in Arvada, Colorado before driving to Colorado Springs and attacking the New Life Church. He killed four people and wounded five others before committing suicide.
December 5, 2007	Omaha, Nebraska	9	4	13	Westroads Mall shooting: A 19-year-old killed eight people and wounded four in a Von Maur department store at the Westroads Mall before committing suicide.
October 10, 2007	Cleveland, Ohio	1	4	5	2007 SuccessTech Academy shooting: A fourteen-year-old student wounded four at his school before committing suicide.
October 7, 2007	Crandon, Wisconsin	7	1	8	Crandon shooting: An off-duty sheriff's deputy entered a homecoming party at a duplex with a semiautomatic rifle and killed six people and wounded one. He killed himself later that day.
August 24, 2007	Marble Falls/Jonestown, Texas	5	0	5	Paul Devoe: An intoxicated man shot and killed a bartender after the shooter attempted to kill his ex-girlfriend and the bartender intervened. The gunman then drove to another ex-girlfriend's house and fatally shot her, her boyfriend, her daughter, and her daughter's friend, then fled. After killing a woman in Pennsylvania, the gunman was arrested in New York.
August 12, 2007	Neosho, Missouri	3	4	7	2007 Neosho church shooting: A man opened fire inside a church, killing three church leaders and injuring four others before holding the surviving churchgoers in a brief hostage situation.
June 14, 2007	Joliet, Illinois	4	1	5	Christopher Vaughn: Four family members were fatally shot and another wounded inside a car. The wounded husband was arrested and convicted of the murders.
May 19–20, 2007	Moscow, Idaho	4	3	7	2007 Moscow, Idaho, shooting: A man killed his wife at their home before luring officers into an ambush at the Latah County Courthouse, where he killed one officer and injured three other people, one of which was an officer. The gunman when retreated into a First Presbyterian Church across the street where he killed the church's caretaker before committing suicide.
April 16, 2007	Blacksburg, Virginia	33	17	50	Virginia Tech shooting: A 23-year-old student killed thirty-three students and teachers, and wounded seventeen others. Other people were injured attempting to escape. When police stormed the building he was in, the shooter killed himself.
February 12, 2007	Salt Lake City, Utah	7	3	10	2007 Trolley Square shooting: A man opened fire in a parking garage and shopping mall and killed five people and injured four others before being killed by police. A wounded victim would die 16 years later.

=== 2006 ===
Date	Location	Dead	Injured	Total	Description
October 2, 2006	Bart Township, Lancaster County, Pennsylvania	7	4	11	West Nickel Mines School shooting: A man took hostages in an Amish schoolhouse, and killed five schoolgirls and injured five others before committing suicide. A wounded victim would die 18 years later.
July 28, 2006	Seattle, Washington	1	5	6	Seattle Jewish Federation shooting: The perpetrator forced his way into the building, repeatedly shouting that he was angry at Israel and wanted to make a statement, he killed one and injured six, five of whom were injured by gunfire.
June 1, 2006	Indianapolis, Indiana	7	0	7	Hamilton Avenue murders: Two perpetrators killed a family of seven in a house at 560 North Hamilton Avenue.
May 29, 2006	Milwaukee, Wisconsin	2	3	5	Octaviano Juarez-Corro: A man shot five people, killing two, after his estranged wife told him that he could not see his daughter. He then fled to Mexico, where he was captured 15 years after being put on the FBI's most wanted list.
May 21, 2006	Baton Rouge, Louisiana	5	1	6	2006 Baton Rouge church shooting: A man fatally shot four of his in-laws at a church before abducting his wife and their three children. He later slew his wife at an apartment complex.
March 25, 2006	Seattle, Washington	7	2	9	Capitol Hill massacre: A guest returned to a house party armed with a shotgun and a semiautomatic handgun. He shot indiscriminately, killing six people and injuring two, before committing suicide.
January 30, 2006	Goleta, California	8	0	8	2006 Goleta postal facility shooting: A woman killed her neighbor before driving to the mail processing plant, where she shot and killed six people before committing suicide.

=== 2005 ===
Date	Location	Dead	Injured	Total	Description
November 20, 2005	Tacoma, Washington	0	6	6	Tacoma Mall shooting: A man attempted suicide by cop by opening fire in a shopping mall with an illegal MAK 90 semi-automatic rifle and a pistol. He injured six people and took four hostages before surrendering to a SWAT team.
September 4, 2005	New Orleans, Louisiana	2	4	6	Danziger Bridge shootings: Four New Orleans Police Department opened fire on a family and a friend of the family on Danziger Bridge, killing the family friend and injuring four other people. The officers then pursued two brothers who fled before one of the officers fatally wounded one of the brothers.
May 30, 2005	Oklahoma City, Oklahoma	4	0	4	Gilbert Postelle: Several men invaded a trailer home and forced four people outside, where they were shot to death with a rifle. The perpetrators believed that one of the victims had been responsible for a motorcycle accident that left one of the perpetrators severely injured.
March 21, 2005	Red Lake, Minnesota	10	9	19	2005 Red Lake shootings: A 16-year-old student killed nine people and wounded nine others before committing suicide.
March 12, 2005	Brookfield, Wisconsin	8	4	12	2005 Living Church of God shooting: A man shot and killed seven members of his church and wounded four others, before committing suicide in a Sheraton hotel.
February 24, 2005	Tyler, Texas	3	4	7	2005 Tyler courthouse shooting: A man shot his ex-wife and son outside a courthouse, killing his wife. Following a shootout the man shot a resident who tried to intervene, before fleeing and dying after a shootout with police.

=== 2004 ===
Date	Location	Dead	Injured	Total	Description
December 8, 2004	Columbus, Ohio	5	3	8	Columbus nightclub shooting: A deranged fan killed four, including musician Dimebag Darrell, and wounded three others before being killed by police.
November 21, 2004	Meteor, Wisconsin	6	2	8	Chai Vang: A man shot eight people while on a hunting trip in northern Wisconsin; six were killed and two were wounded.
June 17, 2004	Birmingham, Alabama	3	1	4	Execution of Nathaniel Woods: A man shot four officers, killing three of them, in a drug house.
March 12, 2004	McKinney, Texas	4	0	4	McKinney quadruple murder: Three men killed four people in a robbery.
March 12, 2004	Fresno, California	9	0	9	Marcus Wesson: A man convicted of the molestation and murders of his children and nieces shot and killed nine members of his family during a standoff over a child custody dispute.

=== 2003 ===
Date	Location	Dead	Injured	Total	Description
November 6, 2003	Chesnee, South Carolina	4	0	4	Todd Kohlhepp: A disgruntled customer shot and killed four people at a motorcycle shop.
August 27, 2003	Chicago, Illinois	7	0	7	2003 Chicago warehouse shooting: A 36-year-old man shot and killed six employees at his former workplace before being killed by police.
July 18, 2003	Clear Lake City, Texas	4	0	4	Christine Paolilla: A seventeen-year-old girl, accompanied by her boyfriend, shot and killed four people following an argument over drugs. One of the victims was also beaten.
July 8, 2003	Meridian, Mississippi	7	8	15	2003 Lockheed Martin shooting: A man opened fire at his workplace, killing six and wounding eight before committing suicide.
July 6, 2003	Bakersfield, California	5	0	5	Vincent Brothers: A man shot and killed five family members before fleeing. He was arrested in 2004 and sentenced to death.
June 14, 2003	Madison County, Montana	1	8	9	2003 Ennis shooting: A man opened fire on a group of people outside of a bar, and then engaged in a high speed chase and shootout with law enforcement, he killed one and injured eight by gunfire including himself.
April 14, 2003	New Orleans, Louisiana	1	3	4	2003 John McDonogh High School shooting: Two perpetrators opened fire in the school gymnasium and killed one student and wounded three others.

=== 2002 ===
Date	Location	Dead	Injured	Total	Description
September 26, 2002	Norfolk, Nebraska	5	1	6	2002 Norfolk bank murders: Four men perpetrated a robbery at a bank. During the robbery, three of them would open fire in the bank, killing five and injuring another before fleeing. Three of the men were arrested three hours later, while the fourth was arrested around midnight.
August 26, 2002	Rutledge, Alabama	6	0	6	Westley Devon Harris: A 22-year-old man broke into his 16-year-old girlfriend's house and shot and killed six members of her family.
July 4, 2002	Los Angeles, California	3	4	7	2002 Los Angeles International Airport shooting: The gunman opened fire at a line of passengers at a ticket counter, he killed two and injured four by gunfire before being killed by a security officer.
January 16, 2002	Grundy, Virginia	3	3	6	2002 Appalachian School of Law shooting: A former student opened fire after a meeting with a professor in the offices of the dean of students and a professor, killing them and a student and injured three other students before he was subdued by a Marine veteran.
January 3, 2002	Lima, Ohio	2	6	8	2002 Lima, Ohio, apartment shooting: A pair of half-brothers, Cleveland Jackson and Jeronique Cunningham, robbed a drug dealer for money and drugs, and shot the dealer and another seven people inside the dealer's apartment. Of all the eight victims, 17-year-old Leneshia Williams and three-year-old Jayla Grant died of fatal gunshot wounds while the remaining six were wounded but survived. Both Jackson and Cunningham were put on trial and convicted of aggravated murder, and sentenced to death.

=== 2001 ===
Date	Location	Dead	Injured	Total	Description
September 8–10, 2001	Sacramento, California	6	2	8	2001 Sacramento shootings: A man killed five people in three separate shootings across Sacramento over the course of two days. On September 10, the perpetrator would engage in a shootout with authorities in two locations in which two were injured before committing suicide.
March 5, 2001	Santee, California	2	13	15	2001 Santana High School shooting: A 15-year-old student entered a boys bathroom and shot another student then left and began to fire widely, another student was killed and thirteen were injured.
February 5, 2001	Melrose Park, Illinois	5	4	9	2001 Navistar shooting: A 66-year-old man returned to his former workplace and fatally shot four people and injured four others before committing suicide.
January 10, 2001	Nevada City & Grass Valley, California	3	2	5	2001 Nevada County shootings: A man opened fire at the Nevada County Department of Behavioral Health in Nevada City where he killed two and injured one by gunfire and another indirectly. He then drove to Lyon's Restaurant in Grass Valley where he killed one and injured another before fleeing. The gunman was arrested at his home later that day.

=== 2000 ===
Date	Location	Dead	Injured	Total	Description
December 28, 2000	Philadelphia, Pennsylvania	7	3	10	Lex Street massacre: Four men shot ten people at a drug house in Philadelphia over a car dispute; seven were killed and three were wounded.
December 26, 2000	Wakefield, Massachusetts	7	0	7	Edgewater Technology shooting: Michael McDermott, an application support employee, shot and killed seven co-workers.
December 14, 2000	Wichita, Kansas	4	1	5	Wichita Massacre: Days after killing one and injuring another in two separate shootings, two people robbed a home before kidnapping its occupants, sexually assaulting the women, and driving them all to the closed Stryker Soccer Complex where they shot all of them execution-style in the back of their heads, killing four of them and injuring the fifth. The two would then drive one of the victim's trucks over their bodies before returning to the victims' home. The two were arrested the following day.
September 22, 2000	Roanoke, Virginia	1	6	7	2000 Roanoke shooting: A man opened fire inside a gay bar in a homophobic attack, killing one man and injuring six others.
September 8, 2000	Atlantic City, New Jersey	3	1	4	2000 Route 30 vehicle shooting: Lloyd Massey II fatally shot three people and another injured another in a car on Route 30 in Atlantic City.
May 24, 2000	New York City, New York	5	2	7	Wendy's massacre: Two robbers locked seven employees in the restaurant freezer and shot and killed five and wounded two during a robbery.
April 28, 2000	Scott Township, Robinson Township, Center Township and Carnegie, Pennsylvania	5	1	6	Richard Baumhammers: A man went on a killing spree and murdered a Jewish woman before setting her house on fire and firing upon a synagogue vandalizing it with swastikas, killed an Indian man who would die from his injuries at a grocery store, shot up another synagogue, killed two at a Chinese restaurant, and an African-American exercising with his White American friend.
March 20, 2000	Irving, Texas	5	1	6	Robert Wayne Harris: A former employee entered a car wash and shot and killed five people and wounded another during a robbery. One of the victims also had his throat slit.
March 1, 2000	Wilkinsburg, Pennsylvania	3	2	5	2000 Wilkinsburg shooting: After having a heated argument with two maintenance workers, Ronald Taylor killed one of the maintenance men before later killing two others at Burger King and McDonald's restaurants.
