= 2026 Twin Falls shooting =

Mass shooting in Idaho, US

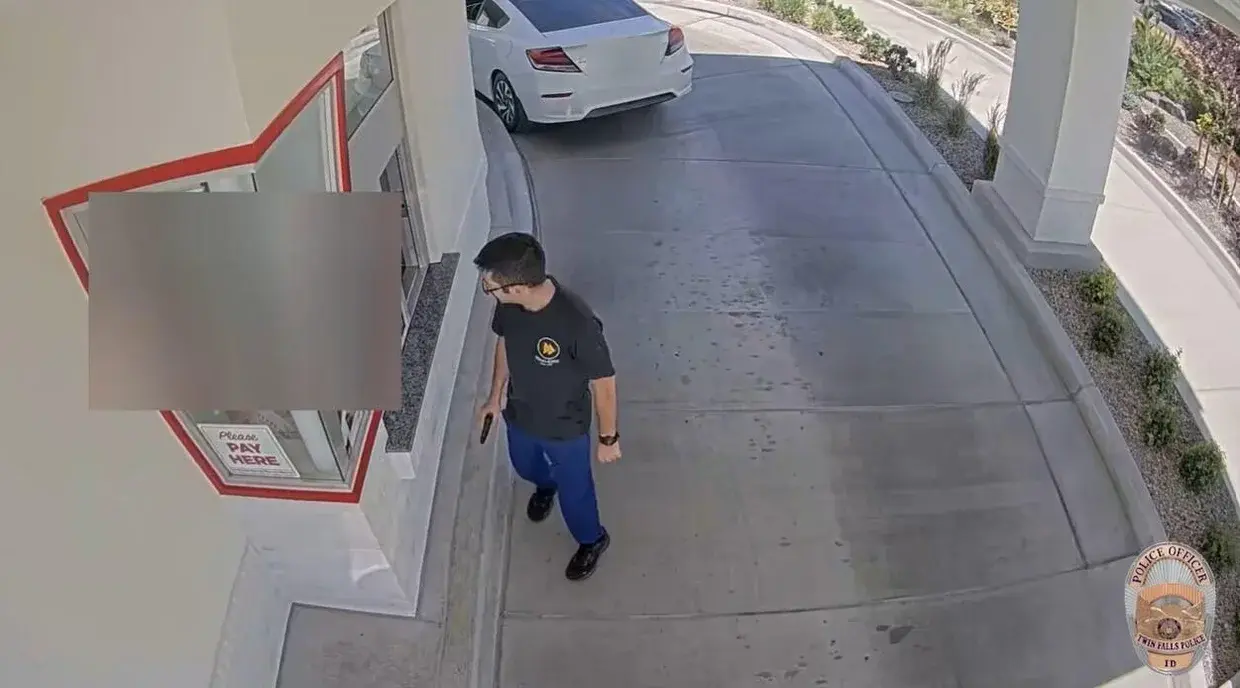
- A CCTV still of Williams at the In-N-Out Burger payment window
- Location: 42.5971°N 114.4555°W; Twin Falls, Idaho, US
- Date: August 1, 2026 c. 2:29 p.m. (MDT; UTC−07:00)
- Attack type: Mass shooting; mass murder; shootout; murder-suicide
- Weapons: Perpetrator: AR-15–style rifle; Handgun; Defenders: FN Five-seven semi-automatic pistol equipped with a suppressor (Salinas); Pistol (James; unused)
- Deaths: 4 (including the perpetrator)
- Injuries: 7
- Perpetrator: Chad Williams
- Defenders: Austin Scott James; Steve McClain; Jordan Salinas
- Motive: Under investigation

On August 1, 2026, a mass shooting occurred at a commercial district in Twin Falls, Idaho, United States. Four people were killed, including the perpetrator, and seven others were injured.

The perpetrator, 24-year-old Chad Williams, began shooting near an In-N-Out Burger restaurant before being confronted and driven from the restaurant by Steve McClain, an off-duty Idaho state trooper, and by an armed bystander named Jordan Salinas, whose return fire police credited with helping prevent additional casualties. Williams then went to the Twin Falls Visitor Center, was confronted by an employee from a different store, then committed suicide after being located by officers while hiding near the edge of a canyon along a nearby walking trail.

The restaurant had been open for one week prior to the attack. A motive is currently under investigation by authorities.

== Background ==
The shooting occurred in one of Twin Falls' primary commercial districts on the city's north side, an area with numerous hotels, chain retailers, and restaurants frequented by both local residents and visitors. Twin Falls, located about 130 miles (210 km) southeast of Boise, serves as a regional center for much of southern Idaho.

The In-N-Out Burger restaurant where the shooting occurred had opened on July 24 as part of the company's recent expansion into Idaho. The Twin Falls City Council approved permits for the restaurant in fall 2024, and construction began in 2025, replacing an Outback Steakhouse location. The restaurant is the company's 441st location, and the fourth in the state of Idaho.

== Shooting ==
=== In-N-Out Burger ===
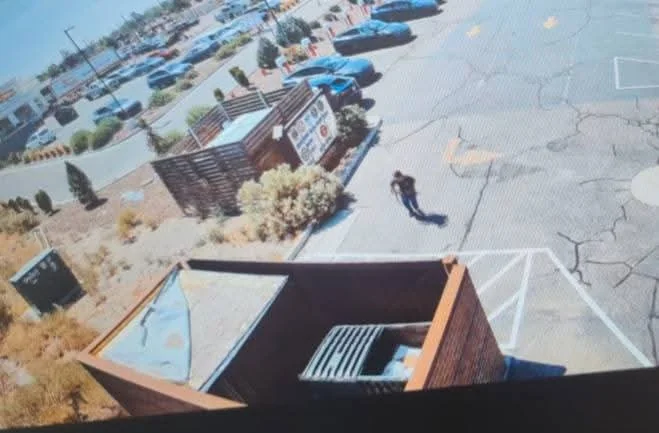
A CCTV still of Williams after shooting the three Tesla victims

The first reports of an active shooter at the In-N-Out Burger restaurant were received by police at approximately 2:29 p.m. MDT. The gunman, 24-year-old Chad Williams, began the attack by pulling up to the restaurant's payment window, where he fatally shot the first victim, Ashley Garibay, an In-N-Out Burger employee, with a handgun. After shooting Garibay, Williams pulled forward in the drive-through lane and parked before exiting the vehicle and fatally shooting Christopher Claunch, who was in another vehicle.

After shooting Claunch, Williams was confronted by former Twin Falls police officer and former Idaho state trooper Austin Scott James, who ran towards the initial shooting scene. Williams then shot and injured James, who then retreated and took out his pistol. James was stopped and pulled back by other people due to his injuries. Williams then returned to the payment window, where he fired at In-N-Out Burger employees who were rendering aid to Garibay. He lowered his handgun before raising it and firing again. At that point, his handgun jammed, and he retrieved a rifle from the back of his car.

As Williams retrieved the rifle, Steve McClain, an off-duty Idaho state trooper inside the restaurant, moved past fleeing In-N-Out Burger employees and toward the payment window. Williams then ran past the payment window and fired at nearby patrons. After shooting at the customers, Williams then returned to the payment window where he exchanged fire with McClain. Williams retreated from the window, before returning and firing into the window again, striking a man in the abdomen who was attempting to assist McClain and render aid to Garibay. The man who was wounded by Williams was accompanied by his son. Williams then moved to the food window of the restaurant, where he observed no one inside and moved away from the restaurant towards Blue Lakes Boulevard North.

A woman fleeing the shooting inadvertently ran toward the location of Williams near the drive-through windows, and upon spotting Williams, hid behind Williams' parked vehicle. The woman picked up the handgun that Williams had left behind, but upon finding that the gun was jammed, discarded it and ran away. Williams then opened fire at vehicles on Blue Lakes Boulevard North which were stopped at a red light, where three victims were struck. Two sisters-in-law were struck by shots fired by Williams at traffic. One was struck in the face and critically injured, and the other, who was six months pregnant, suffered less serious injuries.

Jordan Salinas, an armed bystander, fired shots at Williams with a suppressed FN Five-seven semi-automatic pistol. Salinas had arrived with his girlfriend at the In-N-Out after the shooting began, and went toward the source of the gunfire before spotting Williams shooting at cars while standing near the drive-through window. Williams then ran north to a Tesla charging station, where he fired into two parked Tesla vehicles, striking a victim in the first vehicle and then fatally shooting Dale Schultz and injuring Schultz's wife in the second.

=== Twin Falls visitor center ===
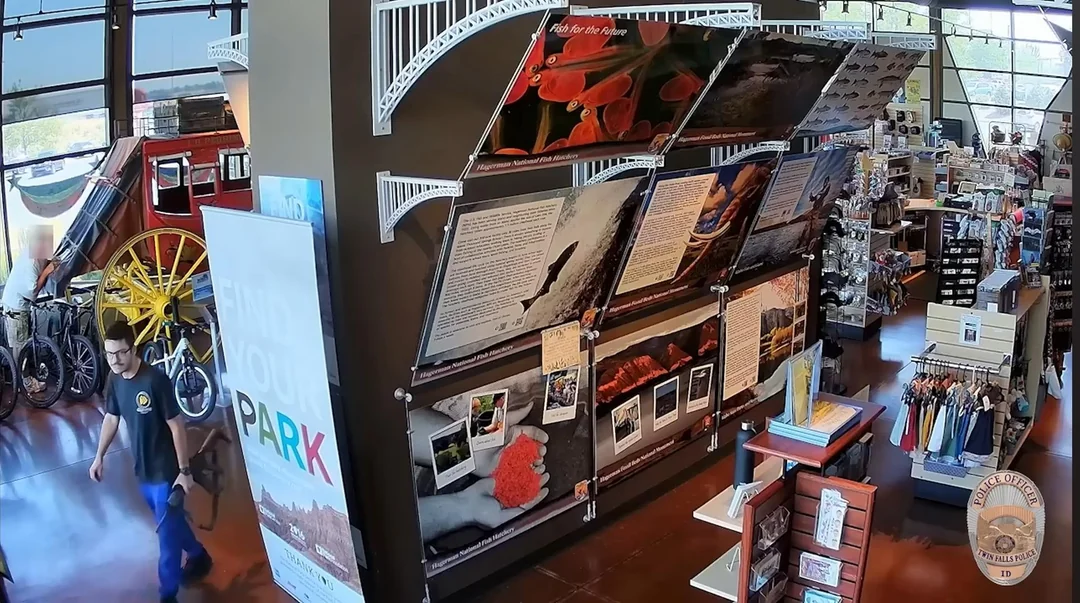
A CCTV still of Williams inside the visitor center walking past the survivor hiding behind the stagecoach

After shooting the three victims, Williams walked towards the Twin Falls visitor center where about three dozen people were inside. At this time, the first responding officer arrived at the scene, and McClain directed him towards the location of Williams. Earlier, tour guide Gabrielle Burton had opened the visitor center front door after guests reported the sounds of gunfire, believing that the sounds were fireworks. After opening the door and realizing that the sounds were indeed gunshots, Burton brought visitors who were looking at flowers outside into the visitor center and then ushered all the visitors away from the windows. Burton hid behind the visitor center's gift shop counter with two teenage employees, standing up briefly to see Williams approaching the building.

After spotting Williams, Burton then ordered everyone into a back hall of the visitor center, where they could hide and lock a door to prevent Williams from getting inside. Burton was the last person who managed to get inside the hallway, while two people hid behind a drink refrigerator near the entrance and another hid behind a stagecoach. Williams walked past the stagecoach, not spotting the person who was hiding there, and to the back wall where he glanced around before spotting an emergency exit that led to Canyon Rim Trail.

=== Perpetrator's suicide ===
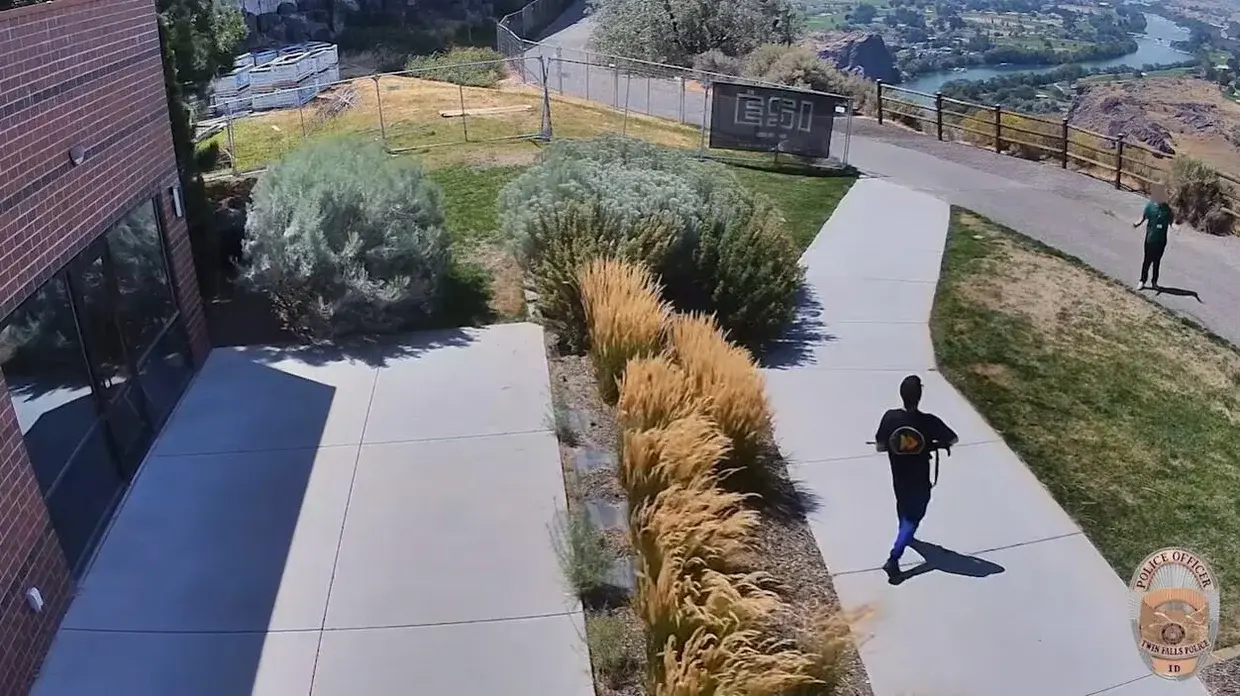
A CCTV still of Williams encountering Stuebe

After exiting the visitor center, Williams then encountered two Dick's Sporting Goods employees on Canyon Rim Trail. One of the employees was 17-year-old Braxton Stuebe, who had evacuated several patrons through the back of the store before running towards the trail with a coworker. Stuebe engaged Williams by trying to talk with him. He pleaded with Williams to stop shooting and even mentioned his family. Hearing Stuebe's words, Williams reportedly became emotional and stuttered out, "Just get away from me, man." This interaction distracted Williams from noticing a group of people further up the trail, allowing them to run away. Williams then fired at Stuebe, missing him, before running farther up the trail as officers closed in on his location. Officers searched the trail, a nearby construction site, and the edge of the canyon by the trail as they responded to incorrect reports of a second gunman. Williams was spotted by an officer hiding near the canyon edge between the construction site and a nearby Petco. After the officer confronted Williams, he fatally shot himself, and his body fell into the canyon.

== Victims ==
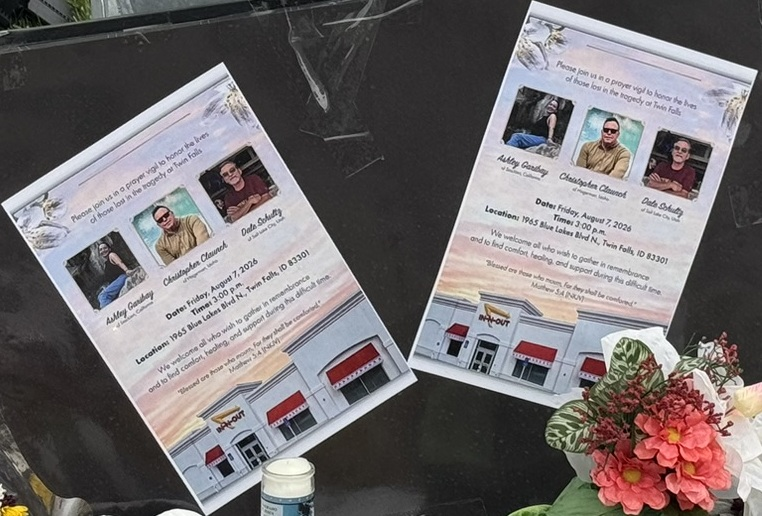
A display set up outside the restaurant showing the victims

Three people were killed, and seven others were injured. Several of the wounded were taken to St. Luke's Magic Valley Medical Center. Austin Scott James, who confronted Williams, was treated by his wife, who was a nurse, in an emergency room. James was struck once by Williams, and the shot shattered his arm and severed an artery. A woman who was shot in the face while on Blue Lakes North Boulevard was released from St. Luke’s Magic Valley on August 14 after undergoing treatment for two weeks. As a result of her injuries, she will undergo reconstructive plastic surgery. A man who was shot on his motorcycle while stopped at a red light on Blue Lakes North Boulevard was struck in his left elbow by a bullet, which damaged tendons that allow a person to move their fingers. As a result of his injuries, doctors needed to reconstruct his elbow and arm. His injuries left him with nerve damage that limited his ability to feel in his fingers. Another victim, a man who was shot twice and suffered serious injuries to his spine and lung while waiting for his Tesla to charge, remained hospitalized until 60 days after the shooting. During his hospitalization, he spent 30 days in a coma.

The victims who were killed in the shooting were 23-year-old Ashley Garibay of Stockton, California, 66-year-old Dale Schultz of Salt Lake City, Utah, and 59-year-old Christopher Claunch of Hagerman, Idaho. Garibay was a manager for In-N-Out who was working at the new Twin Falls location to train new employees. Schultz and his wife had been traveling back to Salt Lake City from a family reunion when they were attacked by Williams at a Tesla charging station.

== Defenders ==
=== Austin Scott James ===
Austin Scott James is a former resident of Sacramento, California, who later moved to Twin Falls and previously worked for the Twin Falls Police Department and the Idaho State Police. James was in the drive-through lane with his wife and a friend when Williams opened fire. James rushed towards Williams' location after telling them to stay in the car, but did not draw his weapon until after he was shot in fear of being misidentified as the shooter by responding law enforcement.

=== Steve McClain ===
Steve McClain is a trooper with the Idaho State Police. He was off-duty when the attack started, and returned fire along with Salinas. McClain helped direct responding officers to the location of the gunman once they arrived on scene. McClain had been recognized for actions he had taken while on-duty in the past. In 2016, McClain was honored for helping save the life of a 35-year-old woman on the side of an interstate who was having difficulty breathing, and in 2020, McClain received Idaho State Police's Life Saving Award for helping four people out of a burning building, warning nearby residents, and helping get a man and his dog out of heavy smoke.

=== Jordan Salinas ===
Jordan Salinas is a 35-year-old from nearby Kimberly, Idaho. Salinas said he had been training with firearms seriously after a mass shooting at the Boise Towne Square left three people dead, including the shooter, and four others injured in October 2021. Following the shooting, Salinas' outline of him confronting Williams was put onto stickers and t-shirts with the caption: "Idaho shoots back". On August 14, Salinas was awarded with a 1.6 lb (25 oz) silver bullet by Money Metals, a gold and silver dealer, in a ceremony attended by state leaders. On September 2, Salinas was awarded with the Speaker’s Award for Patriotic Valor by Idaho House of Representatives speaker Mike Moyle.

== Perpetrator ==
Following the shooting, the perpetrator was identified as 24-year-old Chad Williams. The information was released to the public the day after the attack, with authorities stating that Williams had died from a self-inflicted gunshot wound, and that they believe he acted alone. A motive for the shooting is still under investigation. Williams studied at the College of Southern Idaho from August 22, 2022, to December 14, 2023, and did not graduate with a credential from the school. A former classmate noted his "transformation from student leader to mass shooter" was shocking. While at the school, Williams was a student senator as part of the student government and was later impeached from his position for "procedural" reasons. According to online records, Williams had links to a house in Waddell, Arizona.

Property records showed that Williams and his family had lived in Waddell since 2010. At the age of 16 in 2018, Williams was enrolled at the West Maricopa Education Center, but withdrew in February 2020. The local school district refused to make available any disciplinary records, citing the Family Educational Rights and Privacy Act.

== Aftermath ==
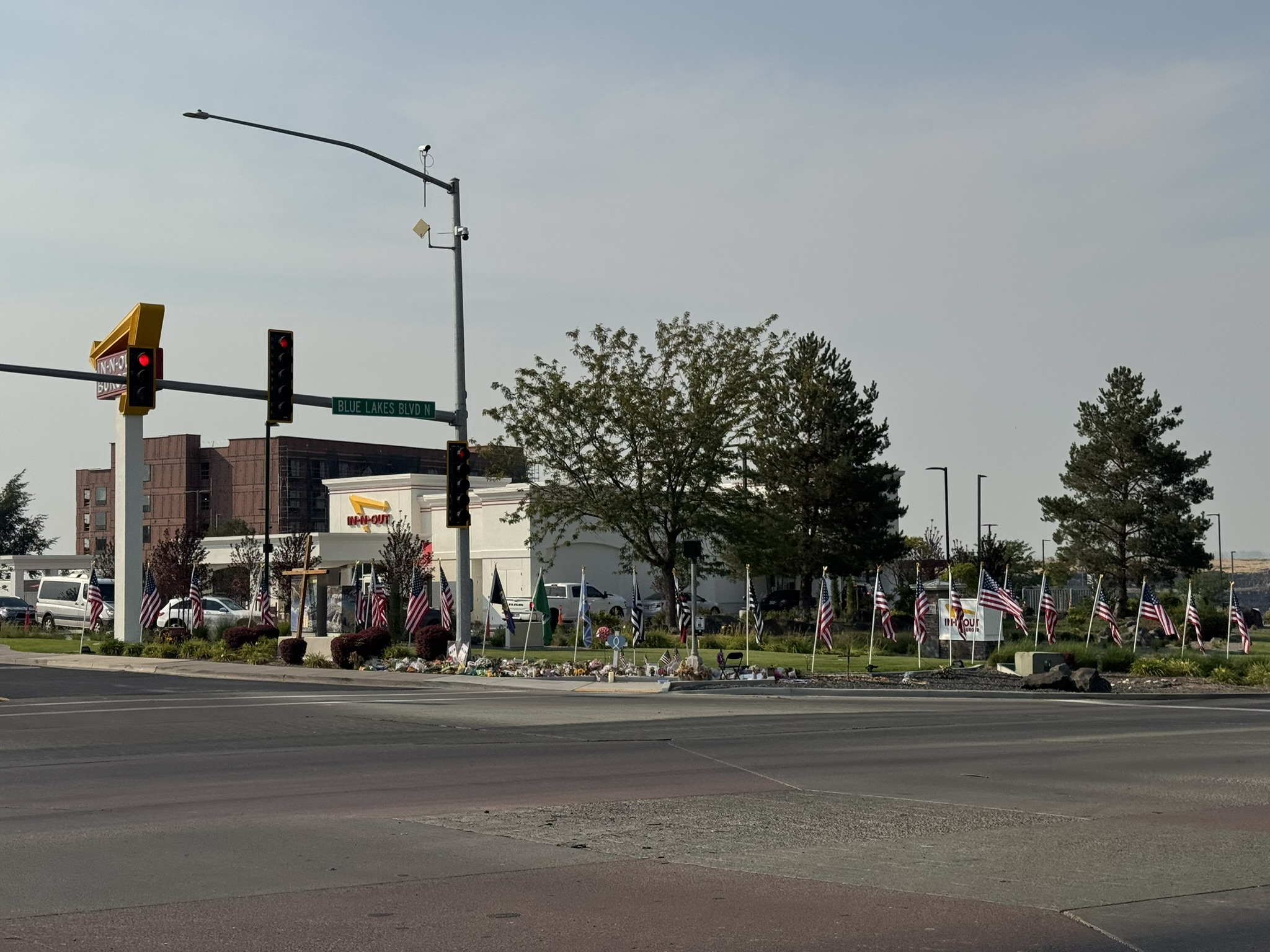
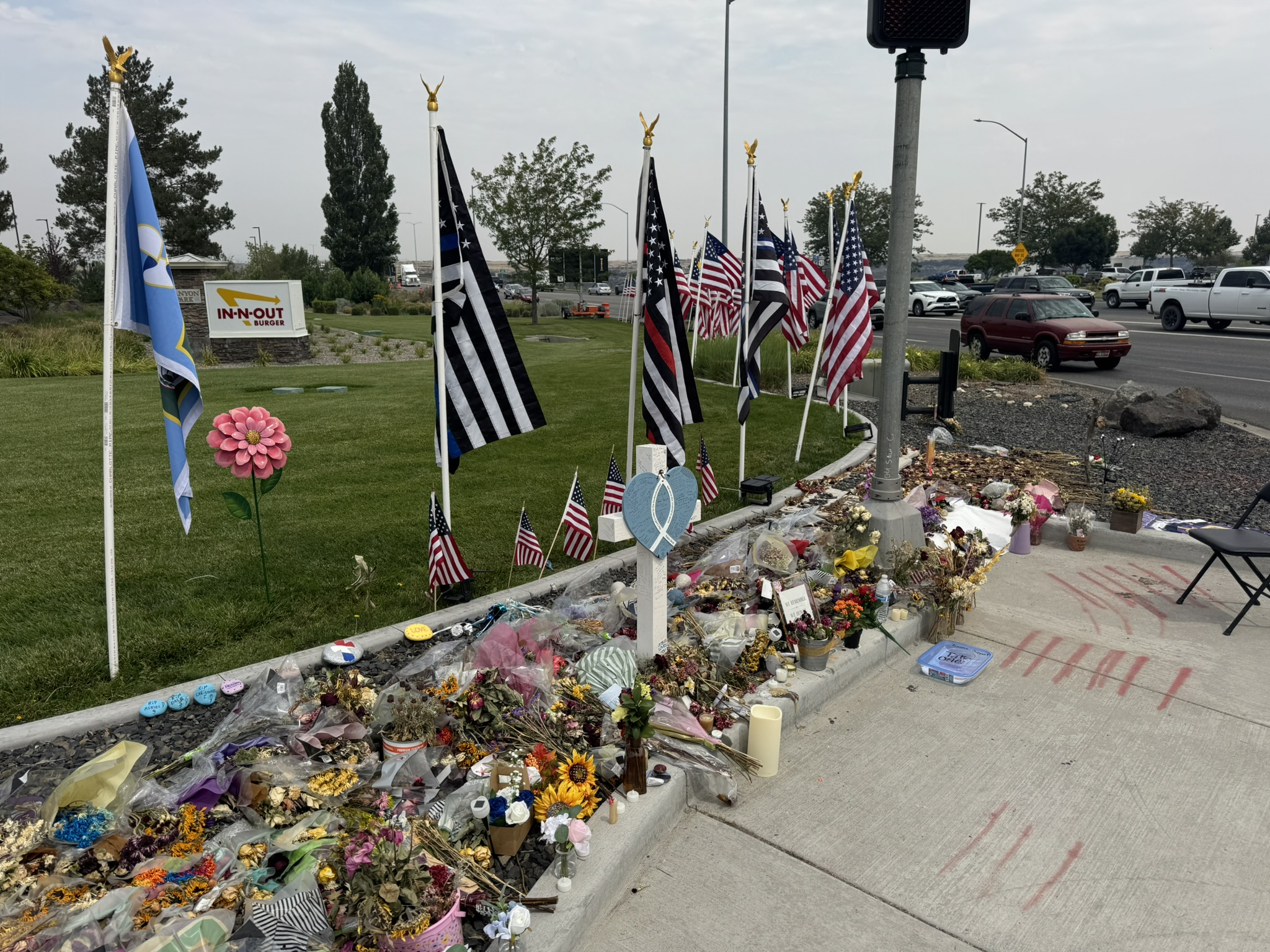
Memorial outside the In-N-Out Burger restaurant (top), closer view of the memorial (bottom)

During a press conference, Twin Falls Police Chief Matthew Hicks praised the actions of Salinas and McClain, stating, "We believe their actions helped drive the suspect away from the scene, preventing further casualties." During a later press conference, Hicks also praised the actions of Stuebe, calling him a "hero" and that the actions he took during his encounter with Williams "likely gave others the time they needed to escape harm". Salinas and McClain also received praise from Twin Falls County sheriff Jack Johnson, who stated, "these people are true heroes in our community" and "they diverted the shooter and without a doubt saved many lives".

The Federal Bureau of Investigation (FBI) announced that they were assisting in the investigation on August 2. The FBI established an online tip line for the public to submit videos and pictures of the shooting the same day. Police officers from Boise, Nampa, Caldwell, Meridian, and additional troopers from the Idaho State Police were sent to Twin Falls in the aftermath of the shooting to supplement the officers of the Twin Falls Police Department and Twin Falls County Sheriff's Office. Police lieutenant Steven Gassert said that the mass shooting and an unrelated shooting in another part of the city the same day involving a suspect who went on the run had "tapped" the department of its resources, but that assistance from other law enforcement agencies had helped to fill gaps.

The Twin Falls Visitor Center was closed the following two days after the shooting. The Idaho Department of Health and Welfare (DHW) deployed behavior health and crisis personnel to support the community in the aftermath of the shooting. The DHW coordinated with local healthcare and community organizations to help connect affected individuals and families to the appropriate services. The neighboring Swig and Mo’ Bettahs Hawaiian Style Food remained temporarily closed the following day due to investigations. A Chick-fil-A in the area had also closed for the remainder of the day due to the events. North Star Taxi, which employed one of the critically injured victims, temporarily ceased their taxiing operations in response.

The parents of an In-N-Out employee who was sent from West Covina, California, to train new employees, said that her phone had been left at the restaurant and become part of the crime scene and without it they had been unable to communicate with their daughter. Her mother said she did not know what hotel her daughter was located at, and while they heard that In-N-Out would organize a flight for their daughter back to West Covina, they had not heard from the company directly.

Twin Falls police, with assistance from the FBI, local, state, federal, and nongovernmental organizations, opened up a family assistance center at Sawtooth Elementary School from August 4–5. Victims and family members of victims could request and collect personal belongings left at the scene of the shooting, and the American Red Cross, mental health support, Crimes' Victims Compensation fund, spiritual care, and other victim assistance services would be made available at the center. The Twin Falls Police Department and FBI also set up a digital family assistance center for those who could not visit the physical location or did not wish to. The city of Twin Falls said that any one who was at the In-N-Out Burger restaurant, the Canyon Park West Complex, the Visitor Center, the Canyon Rim Walking Path, or in a vehicle on Blue Lakes Blvd North during the shooting was a victim and that those persons may qualify for mental health support through the Idaho Crime Victims Compensation Program.

The In-N-Out Burger remained closed for six days following the shooting. The restaurant reopened at 4:15pm on August 7, which the company said was chosen with "thoughtful consideration, respect, and care for our Associates and the Twin Falls community" and to honor the first opening of the original In-N-Out Burger location in Baldwin Park, California, in 1948. A prayer vigil, in which non-employees were invited to take part, was also held on the day of reopening.

The Twin Falls Police Department and Twin Falls School District expanded their school resource program in the aftermath of the shooting, stationing a permanent school resource officer at every secondary school in the district. Prior to the shooting, a few officers were rotated between secondary schools in the district.

Following the shooting, Tesla owners began pressuring the company to allow drivers to leave charging stations in case of emergency without having to select "unlock charge port" on car's screen or trigger the manual release. On October 1, Tesla announced that they were launching the Emergency Drive Away feature for vehicles in the United States, which would allow drivers to shift into drive and drive away in the case of an emergency. The update was not made available to Model S and Model X vehicles built before 2021, and Tesla warned that usage of the feature would "damage your vehicle and the Supercharger" and that it should only be used in case of emergencies and that intentional abuse of the feature would lead to "additional penalties".

The city of Twin Falls partnered with the National Organization for Victim Advocacy to hold community support and education sessions for those impacted by the shooting in seven events from October 12 to November 7. The sessions are intended for employees of In-N-Out Burger, first responders, nearby business owners and employees, and other community members who suffered from the attack.

On September 26, the Twin Falls County Prosecuting Attorney’s Office finished reviewing a "use-of-force incident" involving a Twin Falls Police Department officer during their response to the mass shooting. The office concluded that "there was insufficient evidence" to pursue criminal charges against the officer and that "the officer had a reasonable belief that he was acting in defense of civilians fleeing the active-shooter scene".

== Reactions ==
Idaho senators Mike Crapo and Jim Risch also responded, writing on social media that they were monitoring the situation, with Crapo writing that he was "grateful to the swift response of Idaho's first responders" and Risch writing that he and his wife, Vicki, were praying for the safety of those involved. Representative Mike Simpson, who represents the area, gave condolences to the victims and said that local law enforcement, first responders, and an armed civilian who engaged the shooter had behaved courageously and prevented more fatalities. Simpson added that "We owe them all a debt of gratitude for their selfless service".

Idaho governor Brad Little wrote on social media requesting Idahoans to "join me in keeping the Twin Falls community in your prayers", to follow directions from law enforcement, and to avoid the area of the shooting. Raúl Labrador, the Idaho attorney general, wrote on social media that he was "praying for everyone in Twin Falls" and the same guidance as Little "so first responders can do their jobs".

The City of Twin Falls and the Twin Falls city council released a joint statement two days after the shooting, written by Twin Falls mayor Jason Brown, in which he wrote that the city was "heartbroken" by the shooting, were expressing their condolences to the victims, wanted to thank first responders, and that they were "struggling to understand how something so senseless and tragic could happen here and how so many lives could be changed in an instant".

The CEO of In-N-Out, Lynsi Snyder, released a statement that said her "heart is broken, my chest is heavy, my eyes burn from the tears I've shed" as a result of the attack which resulted in the deaths of an In-N-Out employee and customers. The chief operating officer of In-N-Out, Denny Warwick, said that the company was "heartbroken" by the shooting and that they were cooperating with the investigation.

On August 4, a candlelight vigil was held at Twin Falls City Park around a memorial that had been created in honor of the victims of the attack by the organizers. The memorial consisted of three crosses, with a blue heart inscribed the name of one of the three deceased victims, on which mourners could write tributes to the deceased. City council-member Grayson Stone, who assisted in organizing the vigil, was the only speaker during the event, and he said, "There is nothing I can say right now to help heal us, except for us to be with each other. This is how we heal our community, right here, right now". During the vigil, some participants sang "Amazing Grace".

On the same day as the candlelight vigil, a service was held at St. Olaf Catholic Church in Salt Lake City in honor of victim Dale Schultz which was attended by around 100 people. Church leaders announced plans to make a bronze piece Schultz had created, which he had donated to the church prior to his death, a lasting part of the church, and to install a bronze plaque in honor of Schultz and his wife. The following day, a candlelight vigil was held for victim Ashley Garibay in a Stockton In-N-Out Burger parking lot.

An all-ages benefits concert was organized to raise funds for the families of victims and held at the Tap House Event Center on August 9. A silent auction also took place during the event. A mobile print shop held a fundraiser for the victims on August 11, and sold custom merchandise using a picture of Jordan Salinas' silhouette firing at the shooter with the text, "Idaho Shoots Back", with permission from Salinas and another that read, "Twin Falls Strong". All proceeds from sales on that day were donated to the victims, and the proceeds were matched with a donation by Grease Monkey.

== See also ==
- List of mass shootings in the United States in 2026
- San Ysidro McDonald's massacre, a 1984 mass shooting targeting another fast food restaurant
- Luby's shooting, a 1991 mass shooting that was also targeted in another fast food restaurant
- 2026 Silver Rail Elementary School shooting, a mass shooting in Oregon later that year in which an armed citizen also intervened
- 2007 Moscow, Idaho, shooting, another mass shooting in Idaho
