= 2026 Silver Rail Elementary School shooting =

Mass shooting in Oregon, US

- The area where John forced entry into the school, fenced off by investigators
- Location: 44°2′4″N 121°17′43″W; Bend, Oregon, US
- Date: October 15, 2026; 12:59 p.m. – 1:02 p.m. (PDT; UTC−07:00)
- Attack type: School shooting; mass shooting; mass murder; pedicide
- Weapons: Perpetrator: 12-gauge Mossberg Maverick 88 pump-action shotgun; Defenders: .40 caliber pistol (Giamanco)
- Deaths: 5 (including the perpetrator)
- Injuries: 2
- Perpetrator: Griffin J. John II
- Defenders: Kaylub Giamanco (armed defender); Cassidy Schutz (tackled the shooter)
- Motive: Under investigation

On October 15, 2026, a school shooting occurred at Silver Rail Elementary School in Bend, Oregon, United States. The perpetrator, 16-year-old Griffin J. John II, made entry into the school by jumping over a school fence before shooting through glass panels of a locked door with a pump-action shotgun. John then entered a special education classroom, where four adults and five children were inside at the time, and fatally shot three children and a teacher and injured another student and a teaching assistant. Cassidy Schutz, a teacher in the classroom, threw her mobile phone at the gunman and tackled John. Kaylub Giamanco, a civilian who had followed John into the school, then fatally shot the gunman.

== Background ==
Silver Rail Elementary is a two-story school located in the southeast part of the city, completed in 2015. The school, as well as middle and high schools within the Bend-La Pine School District, have "secure vestibules" in each of the buildings where visitors must enter, then check in with the office staff and sign in via an electronic system that verifies the visitor has passed a background check before being buzzed into the building. All schools also have security cameras installed both inside and outside of all buildings and are equipped with armed school resource officers. Following the Uvalde school shooting in 2022, voters approved new door-locking hardware for the classrooms at Silver Rail, allowing for the doors to be locked by flipping a switch.

The day of the shooting was picture day at Silver Rail Elementary School.

== Shooting ==
A – John approaches fence from undeveloped lot across from the school after shooting at a truck B – Giamanco enters the parking lot after John shot at the truck, and then pursues him C – John enters school through double doors

At 12:59 p.m., the Bend Police Department first received an emergency call from a pickup truck driver in a red Toyota Tacoma who said he confronted a gunman—later identified as Griffin J. John II—in the parking lot of the school before being fired at numerous times with a weapon later identified as a 12-gauge Maverick 88 pump-action shotgun. The driver's Tacoma was struck by gunfire at least six times. John then threw the shotgun over the school fence, before jumping over and moving towards the school.

At 1:00 p.m., Deschutes County dispatchers received multiple emergency calls reporting that a person had entered the school and begun shooting. John forced entry by shooting at the glass panels on the locked doors and targeted the first classroom to the left of those doors, which was a special education classroom. Four adults and five children were in the classroom at the time. Becky Drury, a teaching assistant, said she ran out of the special education classroom to see what was happening, but rushed back to the classroom after spotting John. While she attempted to shut the door behind her, John shot her at close range. Drury said that she was unable to get up and defend herself or others after being shot, so she pretended to be dead. At one point during the shooting, teacher Cassidy Schutz tackled and threw her cell phone at John.

Police officers arrived at 1:02 p.m. Moments later, John was shot and killed inside a classroom by Kaylub Giamanco, a father of two students at the school. A concealed carry permit holder, Giamanco took a .40-caliber handgun legally stored in his vehicle, and followed John inside the school after seeing John shoot his way into the building. Giamanco had crawled towards the doors that John had shot out in order to prevent the gunman from seeing him, and then crawled through a broken panel of one of the doors. Giamanco then re-racked his pistol to make sure that it was ready to fire, and then spotted John struggling with Schutz inside the classroom through a window. Giamanco then opened the door and shot John once, and Schutz ran from the classroom. Giamanco saw John trying to retrieve his shotgun, so he shot him two more times, killing him. According to police, John fired as many as 15 rounds during the attack and had 44 additional rounds concealed in a backpack or on his person.

== Victims ==
Five people were killed at the scene, including the shooter. The victims included three children, ages 5, 8, and 11, and one teacher, 25-year-old Megan Lambert. Saylor Graham, a 7-year-old student, and Becky Drury, a 54-year-old educational assistant, were hospitalized with critical injuries at St. Charles Medical Center. Graham was in stable but serious condition, and Drury had serious but non-life-threatening injuries. The father of the 5-year-old victim identified him as Rhoam Summer. Summer is the youngest person to be killed in a school shooting in the US since tracking began in the 1960s.

Drury had her left hand almost completely severed by the shot that struck her, and it also injured her right arm. In a statement on October 26, Graham's family said that she had been released from the intensive care unit. On October 27, Drury underwent a fourth surgery, with the goal of restoring her ability to use her left hand. On November 14, Graham's family announced that she had returned home to continue her recovery.

== Defender ==
The armed civilian responsible for killing the perpetrator and ending the attack was identified as Kaylub Giamanco, originally of Placerville, California, a 36-year-old carpenter and a father of two students at Silver Rail Elementary. According to reports, Giamanco had previously gone through multiple "military shooting drills", accompanied by Iraq War veterans. Giamanco was driving back from his lunch break when the attack started; after spotting John, he parked his car near the school and called 9-1-1 but did not answer the dispatcher's questions, saying, "I'm sorry, I have to go in. People are going to die." Giamanco then headed to the building, gaining entry by crawling through the shattered glass panels. He shot John three times, killing him. Shortly afterward, Giamanco called his mother, telling her that he "just shot and killed somebody".

According to a childhood friend of Giamanco's, Giamanco had previously saved his brother's life by applying a tourniquet to his leg after a motorcycle accident. Giamanco's brother told the New York Post that Giamanco was not comfortable with being described as a hero. In an interview with Oregon Public Broadcasting, Giamanco said that he knew he was being called a hero, and that "it's getting easier each day to think of himself that way".

Giamanco announced plans to create a nonprofit focused on "mental health advocacy and child security" and that he wants to partner with tech developers and contractors to better safeguard schools from attacks. On November 15, a fundraiser which Giamanco helped to organize took place at the Volcanic Theatre Pub in Bend. The fundraiser, which is planned to be annual, consisted of tattoo artists giving tattoos in order to raise money, with some of the tattoo designs on offer being inspired by shooting victim Rhoam Summer. Giamanco was unable to attend the event because he was stuck in New York following an interview due to a nationwide ground stop for flights, but he appeared via video.

== Perpetrator ==
An undated photo of Griffin J. John II

The perpetrator was identified the following day as 16‑year‑old Bend resident Griffin J. John II (August 20, 2010 – October 15, 2026), a member of the Confederated Tribes of Siletz Indians and a former special education student of the school with no known previous criminal history. John was born in Newport, and four years after his birth, his parents divorced, with his mother retaining custody of him. At the time of the shooting, John lived with his mother in an apartment several blocks away from Silver Rail. According to The Astorian, his father was homeless and living in the woods 250 miles (400 km) away. After being interviewed, John's father reported that he had not been in contact with his son in a year. According to a homeless advocate in the area, John's father had a history of violence, intimidation, drug activity, and sexual abuse. The death of John was reported to him two days after the shooting.

He had struggled to learn from home during the COVID-19 pandemic, when he was 10 years old.

John attended Elk Meadow Elementary School in kindergarten and then transferred to Silver Rail. After elementary school, he attended Pilot Butte Middle School and took his last special education classes in eighth grade. John had lengthy absences from school beginning in the fourth grade up until his sophomore year of high school. John dropped out of school in November 2025 at Bend Tech Academy.

== Investigation and legal proceedings ==
The FBI's Portland field office is aiding in the investigation. Bend police chief Mike Krantz said that John's motive for carrying out the shooting may never be uncovered, but that the investigation was still ongoing. Krantz also said that the weapon used by John in the attack was a legally purchased Maverick 88 pump-action 12-gauge shotgun, and that John used three different types of ammunition during the attack: birdshot, buckshot, and slugs. Investigators determined that the shotgun used in the attack was purchased by John's mother as a birthday gift on his 16th birthday. Oregon state law does not allow minors to purchase a shotgun, but it allows parents or guardians, or a person with their parent or guardian's consent, to transfer the firearm to them. However, minors can only have temporary possession of the weapon for hunting or sports shooting. Federal and local investigators interviewed John's parents and searched his home, seizing computers and other digital devices to gain access to them and determine if there is information on them regarding the attack.

The family of shooting victim Rhoam Summer hired three law firms, Dwyer Williams & Cherkoss, Simon Greenstone Panatier, and Worthington & Caron, to investigate the shooting and determine if there were "possible legal claims". One of the attorneys, Tim Williams, said in a statement that they would investigate "any systemic failures that may have allowed this tragedy to happen", through examining the efficacy of security, the origin of John's weapon, and how John gained access to the firearm and gained entry into the school.

== Aftermath ==
Purple memorial ribbons being given for free outside the school, October 24, 2026

A reunification site was established at Journey Church. Classes and school activities were canceled across the Bend-La Pine School District the following day. Events during the following weekend in Bend's park and recreation district were cancelled in reaction to the shooting. Students who were not students at Silver Rail returned to classes in the Bend-La Pine School District on October 21. Additional police officers were stationed at schools in the district in the aftermath of the shooting throughout the first week of classes returning. Mental health services were made available to returning students at the reopening schools. Child care services through the Boys & Girls Club were made available to parents of Silver Rail students during the closure.

On October 22, the school district announced that it was launching a survey for parents, guardians, and staff to gauge public opinion about when and how best for Silver Rail students to return to classes. On October 27, the school district said that students would return to the school after 86% of those surveyed supported students returning to Silver Rail. The school district did not say when students would be able to return, but said that the school would remain closed at least through November 6 for repairs. On November 9, teachers and staff returned to Silver Rail, with students returning on November 12. The classroom where the shooting took place was covered with a printed out mural from a local artist.

Following the attack, the Deschutes County Sheriff’s Office reported 204 requests for concealed handguns licenses in the weeks after the attack, a nearly twofold increase over the number of requests in the months leading up to the shooting. A firearms training facility in Redmond also reported that they had to increase their capacity and add a second class in order to keep up with the demand for firearms training. The owner of the facility said that many new trainees cited the shooting at Silver Rail as their reason for coming to classes. Additionally, a firearms take-back event was held by nonprofit Guns to Gardens outside Antioch Church in Bend, where 61 firearms were destroyed after people voluntarily turned them over.

== Reactions ==
=== Political ===
Oregon governor Tina Kotek and Bend mayor Melanie Kebler spoke at a vigil at a local park hours after the shooting. Steven Cook, the superintendent of Bend-La Pine School District, also offered his condolences to the families and to everyone affected by the violence. Kotek later ordered all flags lowered to half-staff to honor the victims of the shooting. On October 26, Kotek issued an executive order to have the state's education and emergency management agencies to provide more assistance to the school district and also declared a state of emergency. In a press conference, Kotek said she had dispatched workers to from various state agencies to help the Bend-La Pine School District apply for federal grants, assist staff members in receiving paid leave benefits, and quickly process background checks for educators, substitute teachers, and crisis counselors. On November 6, Kotek said that she would ask the Oregon state legislature to approve $10 million in emergency funds to support the city of Bend.

President Donald Trump called the attack "a terrible thing" and praised Giamanco's actions, describing him as a "great hero" who "took care of business" Oregon senators Jeff Merkley and Ron Wyden released statements offering condolences, and Wyden called for gun reform. US representative Janelle Bynum, who partially represents Bend, said she was pausing activity in her reelection campaign in response to the shooting and issued a statement condemning the attack. Her election opponent, Deschutes County commissioner Patti Adair, also paused her campaign and offered condolences to the victims. Oregon state representatives Vikki Breese-Iverson, Jason Kropf, and Emerson Levy, all of whom partially represent Bend, also released statements after the shooting. The chair of the Oregon Republican Party, Connie Whelchel, also praised Giamanco's actions, but criticized a 2021 state law which prohibited firearms on school property regardless if the carrying person had a concealed handgun license. State representative Anna Scharf wrote that Bend-La Pine School District's gun-free policy made it "a soft target for a person with nothing but a desire to kill innocent people". Scharf later said in an interview that she believed that the state had focused too much on restricting gun ownership and possession rather than addressing mental health issues and stationing police officers at schools.

Walkouts, led by volunteers from Students Demand Action, were staged by students across schools in Oregon on October 22. The group said the purpose of the walkouts was to allow students to "stand in solidarity with the Bend community and call attention to their right to attend school without fearing gunfire". Oregon governor Tina Kotek and US representative Janelle Bynum joined a walkout at Lakeridge High School in Lake Oswego. Bynum also sent a letter to Immigration and Customs Enforcement (ICE) to suspend operations in Bend and Deschutes County, in which she wrote that fear of ICE was keeping immigrant families from accessing resources that were made available to affected families after the shooting. On October 26, students from high schools in Bend staged walkouts in protest against gun violence, and marched to Peace Corner in downtown Bend.

The founder of the Oregon Gun Owners Action League, Derek LeBlanc, said that he wanted to see all state laws repealed which could possibly penalize someone like Giamanco and to pass legislation which would create civil protections for "the defenders". The executive director of Alliance for a Safe Oregon, Amie Wexler, opposed proposals to increase school security and station more police officers at schools, saying that the proposals lacked evidence and did not take into account the experiences of students from diverse ethnic backgrounds who are more likely to suffer from racial profiling by police inside and outside of schools.

On November 10, Representative Bynum led a tribute and a moment of silence on the floor of the US House of Representatives to the shooting victims. Bynum was also joined by members of the Oregon Delegation and the Gun Prevention Violence Task Force. Bynum later introduced a House resolution to honor Silver Rail Elementary School and the Bend community and provide national support. Senators Merkley and Wyden introduced a similar resolution in the US Senate.

=== Community and family ===
The mother of John tearfully spoke to reporters from outside her apartment complex the morning after the shooting, saying that she would have prevented the shooting if she could have, and that she missed her son and was sorry for the loss of the victims. While speaking to reporters, she declined to say how John obtained the shotgun used in the attack. John's father was located by investigators two days after the shooting, living homeless in the woods near Astoria. John's father told investigators he had not been in contact with his son for over a year, and after he was located by two journalists at his encampment, he told them he was "going through a lot right now" and asked them to leave.

Dozens of local businesses organized a toy drive for students of Silver Rail, with 37 drop site locations set up across Bend, La Pine, Sunriver, Redmond, Tumalo, and Prineville, and an option to mail-in donations. The toy drive lasted until October 23. The Portland Thorns donated $10,000 to the Oregon Community Foundation's Rapid Response Fund to support those affected by the shooting, and Dutch Bros Coffee announced that they were donating a portion of all proceeds from their locations across Oregon to support students, educators, and families affected by the shooting. In total, Dutch Bros Coffee raised over $160,000. A local brewery raised over $110,000 for the victim's families during a fundraiser on October 21. Various fundraisers had raised over $2 million for victims and Giamanco by October 23. A walk in Bend to honor shooting victim Megan Lambert was organized by R.A.D. Camps took place on October 25, with hundreds of people in attendance. Les Schwab Tire Centers established a charitable foundation, and donated $100,000 to the recovery efforts after the shooting. On October 24, Kendall Auto Group raised over $50,000 in donations to shooting recovery efforts, and matched the raised total with their own donation. On November 13, Carl's Jr. locations in Bend and Redmond donated all proceeds to the Silver Rail Elementary Recovery Fund, and the following day, SubuGuru, a Subaru repair shop, donated 100% of their proceeds from oil changes to the fund during a eight and half hour period.

On November 5, community members questioned school district officials and public safety officials during a public meeting. According to KGW, most of the discussion centered around physical security at schools in the district. District Superintendent Steve Cook and Director of School Safety Scott Bojanowski said that major security upgrades currently were not within the district's budget, and that major changes would require voter-approved bonds or additional state or federal funding. Community members also criticized the school district's communication and response to the shooting.

== See also ==
- 1998 Thurston High School shooting, another mass shooting at a K–12 school in Oregon
- 2015 Umpqua Community College shooting, the deadliest mass shooting in Oregon
- 2022 Bend, Oregon shooting, a mass shooting that occurred in the same city four years prior
- 2026 Twin Falls shooting, a mass shooting in Idaho that occurred earlier in the year, in which armed citizens intervened
- Good guy with a gun
