= Bend, Oregon shooting =

Bend, Oregon shooting may refer to:

- 2022 Bend, Oregon shooting
- 2026 Silver Rail Elementary School shooting
