= Grease monkey =

Grease monkey may refer to:

- Grease monkey, a slang term for a mechanic
- Grease Monkey (business), a franchised chain of automotive service centers
- Greasemonkey, an extension for Mozilla Firefox
- Grease Monkey, a comic
- Grease monkey, a slang term for a slightly built burglar with entry skills.
