= 2000 Roanoke shooting =

Mass shooting in Virginia, US

Roanoke shooting
- Location: 37.2721°N 79.9481°W; Backstreet Cafe; Roanoke, Virginia, US
- Date: September 22, 2000 c. 11:30 p.m. (EDT; UTC−04:00)
- Target: LGBTQ people
- Attack type: Mass shooting (Note: Hate crime laws in Virginia did not protect sexual orientation at the time of the shooting.)
- Weapon: 9mm Ruger semi-automatic pistol
- Deaths: 1
- Injuries: 6
- Perpetrator: Ronald Edward Gay
- Motive: Homophobia
- Verdict: Guilty
- Convictions: First-degree murder Aggravated malicious wounding (x3); Malicious wounding (x3; suspended sentence)

On September 22, 2000, 54-year-old Ronald Edward Gay opened fire inside Backstreet Cafe, a predominately gay bar in Roanoke, Virginia, United States. Gay murdered one man and injured six others. Gay described himself as a "Christian soldier" and said that all LGBTQ "meeting places and bars will be destroyed" if gay people did not move to San Francisco. Police said that he was also angry over the connotations of his surname, although he later denied this was the case, and that he was upset that two of his sons had changed their surnames. On July 23, 2001, Gay was found guilty of one count of first-degree murder, three counts of aggravated malicious wounding, and three suspended counts of malicious wounding, and sentenced to four consecutive life terms. Gay died at a hospital on January 15, 2022, of natural causes.

== Background ==
In 1971, Roanoke's first gay rights group, The Gay Alliance of the Roanoke Valley, was founded. However, it only lasted until the following year. The city would be without another gay rights group until 1977, when the Free Alliance of Individual Rights was founded, but that too would last only until the following year. Since 1978, various LGBTQ rights groups have been active in the city.

At the time of the shooting, same-sex sexual intercourse was illegal in Virginia, something that would not be rectified until 2003, when the Supreme Court ruled that laws that criminalized sodomy between consenting adults were unconstitutional in Lawrence v. Texas. Additionally, hate crime laws in Virginia did not protect sexual orientation or gender identity at the time of the shooting. A year prior, a bill to expand hate crime legislation to protect people based on their sexual orientation failed by one vote in a Virginia Senate committee. In 2000, Backstreet Cafe was one of three active LGBTQ bars, clubs, or restaurants in Roanoke, with the first one, Elmwood Diner, being established in the mid-1920s and lasting until the early 1970s.

== Shooting ==
On the day of the shooting, Ronald Edward Gay booked a room at a downtown motel in Roanoke, after telling a taxi cab driver he was going there to take a shower and asked him to pick him up from there the next morning. Gay socialized with two people who had booked a room next to his, and reportedly introduced himself with his full name and told them "I'm not gay like my name sounds". The group drank whiskey together and late that evening, Gay gave them the key to his room and told them that if he didn't return by the next morning they could have everything in his room and that he was going out to eat at McDonald's and watch fireworks. Before leaving, Gay told them to watch the news in the morning if he didn't return and winked and grinned at them. After leaving the motel, Gay went to a tavern in Roanoke for directions to the nearest gay bar. After being told of Backstreet Cafe, Gay showed off his 9 mm automatic pistol to the patrons at the restaurant, prompting them to call the police.

Gay entered Backstreet Cafe at around 11:30 p.m. ET and ordered a draft beer. Gay pulled out his pistol upon seeing two men hug, and opened fire, killing 43-year-old Danny Overstreet and wounding 39-year-old John Collins. Collins reported seeing Gay stand up as the pair finished their hug and then pull out the pistol from a black trench coat he was wearing before opening fire. After shooting Overstreet and Collins, Gay sprayed the bar with gunfire, wounding five other people. Collins recalled Gay stepping over him as he pretended to be dead before Gay exited through the front door. After Gay left, the manager of the bar locked the door as survivors began tending to the wounded victims, putting sweaters and jackets onto wounds to slow bleeding. Overstreet's body was covered with a table cloth so that people wouldn't be able to see his body.

After leaving, Gay disposed of the pistol in a trash can near the Virginia Museum of Transportation, stating that he got rid of it because he didn't want to hurt a police officer. Gay was apprehended by police two blocks away from the bar. The arresting officer conducted an interview of Gay with audio from his patrol car. The officer asked Gay where he came from, to which Gay replied that he had come "from a fag bar and blew them away". The officer asked Gay why he had done that, to which Gay replied that "the Lord told me to". Gay then asked the officer to "put [him] to death", to which the officer responded that he wouldn't.

== Victims ==
One man was killed in the attack, and two men and four women suffered gunshot wounds. The murdered victim was 43-year-old Danny Overstreet, who worked as a beautician and for Verizon as a customer service representative. Overstreet died within minutes of being shot in the chest. The injured victims were identified as 41-year-old Iris Webb, who was critically injured after being shot in the neck, 39-year-old John Collins, who was shot in the stomach with a bullet rupturing his colon and exiting through his hip, 40-year-old Joel Tucker, who was shot in the back, 36-year-old Kathy Caldwell, who was shot in the left hand, losing her left middle knuckle, and right shoulder, 45-year-old Susan Smith, who was shot in the right leg, and 41-year-old Linda Conyers, who was shot in the right arm and hand.

Some victims of the shooting expressed fear of discrimination after the injuries they suffered in the shooting outed them, with Tucker fearing being attacked again after newspapers published his address. Tucker said that he lied and told reporters that he was straight and that he was there with his girlfriend and returned to work with a bullet in his back in order to prevent himself from being outed. Some witnesses to the shooting also declined to give their full names when conducting interviews after the shooting out of similar fears.

== Legal proceedings ==
Ronald Edward Gay was charged with first-degree murder and initially six counts of aggravated malicious wounding, but the latter was downgraded to just six counts of malicious wounding by Roanoke commonwealth's attorney, Donald Caldwell, as the injuries to the surviving victims did not cause permanent physical pain and impairment, according to assistant commonwealth's attorney John McNeil. Gay plead guilty to the charges, but nearly withdrew the guilty plea before taking a conference with his defense lawyers. Gay's defense also considered using the insanity defense, and his family paid for analysts to study it, but a psychiatrist and psychologist who examined Gay determined that he was sound of mind. As part of the plea deal, prosecutors dropped seven firearms charges against him which would have added 33 years to a sentence of at least 95 years, leaving a maximum of four life terms plus 60 years. Gay was made eligible for geriatric release, but needed to be in very poor health in order to receive it.

During his plea hearing, Gay interjected repeatedly during circuit judge Clifford Weckstein's questioning, stating that he "didn't know" any of the people that he shot and that it "was not a hate crime". Gay also said during the hearing that he had the idea of committing the shooting for years, and that he "buried" the idea until he had been "driven insane" to do it. Gay also requested to look at a picture of Danny Overstreet at the scene, the man he had killed, and said that it was "not the guy I shot", saying that he remembered shooting a man wearing a cap, a wig, and a buckskin jacket, but according to Caldwell, of those items Overstreet had only been wearing a cap at the time of his death. Gay also said that his initial claim to police that he had committed the shooting because of his last name was false, and if it had been because of his name he "would've done it 10 years ago". Weckstein did not immediately schedule a sentencing date for Gay in order to allow the defense to study Gay's psychological history.

On July 23, 2001, Gay was sentenced to four consecutive sentences of life in prison for first-degree murder and three counts of aggravated malicious wounding as physical pain to three of the victims persisted. In addition to those sentences, Gay also received three five-year suspended sentences for three counts of malicious wounding. Gay remained eligible for geriatric release, but Weckstein ruled that if that were to happen, he would be required to be under intense supervision. A victim of the shooting, Kathy Caldwell, who was in attendance for the sentencing said that Gay stared at her, nodded up and down, and pointed an index finger skyward, which she interpreted as him referencing Judgement Day. A psychologist who analyzed Gay and testified for the defense said that it was a "close call" to not use the insanity defense. Gay served his sentence at Deerfield Correctional Center in Southampton County.

== Perpetrator ==
Ronald Edward Gay (December 22, 1945 – January 15, 2022) was born in Canada and grew up in Dartmouth, Nova Scotia. Gay married six times, twice to the same woman, and had three sons. When Gay turned 18-years-old, he immigrated to the United States to become a US citizen and join the US Marine Corps. In 1966, while Gay was in boot camp, his father, Cecil Gay, died, and his mother remarried and moved to Saskatchewan. At the time of his father's death, the Gay family were in a land dispute with the Canadian government. The family alleged that the Canadian government never compensated them for land that it had appropriated from them in the 1940s, and shortly after his father's funeral, Gay set up camp on the land in an attempt to claim it from the government. Gay's brother said that his brother planned to build a bunker on the land, and that Gay drove a truck filled with sand to the property to make sandbags on-site, but that the truck's axle had broken on the way.

Gay served one tour of duty in Vietnam during the Vietnam War before returning to the United States in 1969, where he moved to northern Virginia and married his first wife. While serving in Vietnam, Gay was a gunner charged with protecting convoys from enemy fire. According to Gay's brother, a truck with several of Gay's friends inside was destroyed in an attack and Gay had to collect the body parts of the victims. Gay suffered a back injury during his tour of duty in Vietnam, for which he received a pension, and was diagnosed with post-traumatic stress disorder which he sought treatment for at various veterans hospitals. A psychologist who analyzed Gay said that "he was an odd fellow" before joining the Marines, and that he had been "sort of a fragile egg" when he joined, and that through his service he became a "much more odd fellow".

After divorcing his second wife, Jeannie Gay, he moved to Tennessee from Virginia, where he was briefly homeless and married his third wife. While in Tennessee, Gay received treatment at a Veterans Affair (VA) hospital in Johnson City. He divorced his third wife at some point and then moved to Florida in 1992, where he married his fourth wife two years later, but they divorced not long after, but through her he met his fifth wife, Laura Ramsey, who he married in 1994. At the time they met, Ramsey was in a same-sex relationship, which he was aware of and did not appear to take issue with.

After Gay and Ramsey divorced, he rented a home in Huddleston, Virginia. In April 2000, first responders were called to Gay's home after he reportedly burned his legs while attempting to burn his divorce papers and some brush with gasoline a few days earlier. The following month, Gay's home was destroyed in a fire which investigators determined had been caused by a clothes dryer.

A spokesperson for the VA Medical Center in Washington, D.C., said that Gay had been a patient at the hospital and had last visited earlier that year in April. Gay reportedly missed one appointment with the VA before calling in July and saying that he was moving to Florida. In June, a Florida judge issued a protective order against Gay which required Gay to surrender his firearms and submit to a mental evaluation after Gay reportedly forced his way into Ramsey's home in Citrus Springs, demanding to see their 4-year-old son. There is no evidence he did either. Ramsey alleged that he was upset over a court ruling which required Gay to pay $2,000 back in child support even though he had signed paperwork to hand over full custody of their son to her and her new husband. After forcing Gay out of her home, he reportedly told her "I'll come back and blow you all away".

Gay said in a police interview after his arrest that he had been on a "mission" to kill homosexuals since the mid-1980s and that when he opened fire that the "person across from [him] was Lucifer's advocate". He also told police that he had been contemplating the shooting for years and also considered burning a gay bar in Roanoke in 1989, but "failed". Gay also wrote a letter to The Roanoke Times after his arrest, which the publication described as "nearly indecipherable", in which he claimed he was a Christian soldier working for the Lord, that when he was dead another would replace him, and that LGBTQ people's "meeting places and bars will be destroyed with them" if they did not move to San Francisco. In the letter, Gay also lambasted The Roanoke Times for not writing about the "moral flaws" of LGBTQ people in a four-part series the publication had made about gays and lesbians living in the Roanoke Valley. Gay also wrote that God preferred gay meeting places and bars be "burnt to kill" the AIDS virus, "or slow it down". On January 15, 2022, Gay died of natural causes while being treated at a hospital.

=== Family and friend's statements about perpetrator ===
Gay's brother said that his brother's attempt to build a bunker on land that the family believed that they hadn't been compensated for by the Canadian government was "the beginning" of Gay's unraveling. His brother also said in a phone interview after the shooting that Gay was upset over taunting he had received about his last name in the past and that he had become more upset when two of his three sons changed their surnames and that Gay did not like that Ramsey had been in a same-sex relationship before they married. Gay's brother also denied that his brother was homophobic, stating that he believed his brother had "just snapped" due to problems in his life. His brother also said that Gay had written a letter to the US president asking homosexuals to stop using the word "gay" to describe their sexual orientation and that Gay had hand-delivered it to the White House in the 1980s.

Ramsey said that she had been upfront about her being in a same-sex relationship before when they got together and that "it was not a problem" and that she never felt that Gay was homophobic and that he would socialize with her LGBTQ friends during parties. She did note that Gay would remark that that "they're using my name" when the word "gay" was used on television to describe homosexuals, but that he had never made an explicitly negative comment about gay people. Ramsey also said that Gay was violent, but that she did not believe that his surname was the reason.

Jeannie Gay said that after they married in 1980, Gay's mental health appeared to deteriorate. She said that he suffered from night terrors and that he'd choke his pillow and sometimes her, and that he would leave for months on end only to return and act as if nothing had happened. She also reported that Gay said that he was a prophet of God and that he began sending Bibles and cryptic messages to the Canadian prime minister and the US president, and that she lived in fear of her husband and believed that she'd "be the one he'd kill". The Secret Service created a file on Gay as a result of the Bibles and messages that he sent the US president, and the agency turned it over to the Roanoke Police Department after his arrest. After Gay began to seek treatment at the VA Medical Center in Salem, Virginia, in early 1986, she moved to Virginia with him in order to aid in his recovery; the pair rented an apartment together in Roanoke County. She reported that he took Prozac and Klonopin and began selling windows, but that one day she came home to Gay flushing the medication down the toilet and afterwards he became increasingly paranoid and violent, causing her to move back to Nova Scotia out of fear for her life.

In 1997, after the divorce with Ramsey, Gay called Jeannie and said that he wanted to see her. Jeannie moved in with him at a home he rented in Huddleston and she said that "he seemed like his old self" before he became unstable. In August 1998, friends reported that Gay visited the Vietnam War Memorial in Washington, D.C., which he described as difficult, but that it was something he needed to do. He brought her to Mill Mountain in Roanoke after he returned and told her that he had camped out there for a year and would only leave to get noodles and bread from the city. In September 1999, the pair remarried in Bedford County, but later that year she reported that his mental health began to deteriorate again. In fall 1999, Gay purchased the 9 mm caliber pistol he used in the shooting from a Roanoke gun store, and she reported that the gun was never far from a holster he wore on his hip.

Jeannie reported that Gay had become a drunkard and had begun consuming a lot of Canadian whiskey and that when she brought him to the VA hospital in Salem, doctors told her that they would not give him his medication if he was drinking, but warned against taking Gay off of the medication. Jeannie said that Gay told her that God had begun speaking to him again in March 2000, and that she had to go. Jeannie moved to Florida, but two weeks after leaving, Gay called her and told her that God had told him that she could return, but she refused.

In April, Gay moved to Dunnellon, Florida, with his sister at a hotel she worked at. His sister reported that he seemed happy and would collect spare change and throw it under a tree at the hotel and then tell children that the hotel had a money tree. On June 18, Gay went to Citrus Springs and broke into the home of Ramsey, demanding to see his son he had with her and threatening to shoot her and her new husband, but left before police arrived on scene. After that incident, his sister reported that he visited a VA hospital in Gainesville and continued to live with her for a few months, but briefly attempted to wean off his medication before returning to full dosage. Gay moved back to Roanoke in August and lived at a campground.

== Reactions ==
Roanoke mayor Ralph Smith and city manager Darlene Burcham condemned the violence. The pair spoke in a news conference after the shooting, with Smith stating that "any time one member of our community suffers at the hand of another, we all suffer by the same hand", while Burcham said that the city did not "want this to reflect upon our community at all" and that Roanoke was a city of "broad diversity".

A spokesperson for Virginia senator John Warner said that Warner was "profoundly concerned by what happened in Roanoke" and said that Warner opposed a hate crime bill which was stalled in a conference committee which would expand the definition to protect sexual orientation because the bill was attached as an amendment to a defense bill and might threaten military funding as a result, because it might not survive constitutional review, and because it might overrule tougher state legislation on hate crimes.

The governor of Virginia, Jim Gilmore, said that he would continue to oppose expanding hate crime legislation after the shooting because "the criminal justice system is there to deal with situations just like the one that happened in Roanoke". Virginia state senator Patsy Arlington of Alexandria, who had perennially sponsored bills to expand the hate crime definition to protect people based on their sexual orientation said that she would "keep trying" to get it passed and that "with each vicious crime that gets publicity, people will get to know innocent faces of the victims" and that eventually "people will open their hearts". Virginia delegate, Richard Cranwell of Vinton, said that he opposed expanding hate crime legislation to protect sexual orientation because he took issue with using the status of a victim to increase the punishment of a perpetrator and because he felt that adding more protected groups would have a runaway effect, asking "where does it stop?", and because he believed it wouldn't have made a difference in the perpetrator's criminal case. Delegate Morgan Griffith of Salem said when asked about expanding hate crime legislation, "Gee, I thought they'd be pushing to allow law-abiding citizens to arm themselves in restaurants. Because those who are determined to commit crimes are going to have the guns" and that if the patrons had been armed it would not have been able to save the first victim, but that "you would have to wonder how many of those other folks would be in serious condition" if they were armed. Griffith said that he opposed creating protected groups under hate crime legislation.

The communications director for the National Gay and Lesbian Task Force, David Elliot, said that the shooting shook the LGBTQ community and that it was widely discussed online in the immediate aftermath among LGBTQ people. Elliot said, "everybody's extremely upset about this" and that he could not recall such a high-casualty shooting attack at an LGBTQ establishment before. A spokesperson for the group also said that a fund was created to help pay for the medical expenses of the victims. In San Francisco, a gay pride flag which flew over the Castro District was lowered in honor of Danny Overstreet after the shooting.

The Communications Workers of America (CWA), of which Overstreet was a member of a local chapter, released a statement decrying the shooting and expressing support for expanding hate crime legislation after the shooting, and members of the union attended vigils for Overstreet and his funeral. Larry Cohen, then the vice president of the CWA, expressed support for hate crime legislation, saying in a rally in Lafayette Square in Washington, D.C. that the union saw "human rights and workers’ rights as two sides of the same coin" and that they were "committed to the mandate in our union to fight against hate crimes and violence of all types", and called for workplace education which promoted diversity and multiculturalism. The rally was also attended by the civil rights representative of the American Federation of Labor and Congress of Industrial Organizations, Richard Womack, the executive director of the Leadership Conference on Civil Rights, Wade Henderson, and Virginia senator Chuck Robb.

Vigils were held each day outside Backstreet Cafe after the shooting until September 29, and a larger vigil was held at Elmwood Park on September 28. A gathering to discuss the shooting among community members was originally meant to be held at a church on Kirk Avenue, but had to be moved outside the larger and predominantly LGBTQ congregation Metropolitan Community Church of the Blue Ridge due to overcrowding issues. Danny Overstreet's co-workers at Verizon also created a makeshift memorial for him at his cubicle where he worked.

Reverend Catherine Houchins, the pastor the Metropolitan Community Church of the Blue Ridge, said that members of the LGBTQ community did not believe that the perpetrator's claim of it not being a hate crime was true, even if it didn't meet the legal definition in Virginia law, stating that "if one chooses to go deer hunting, one doesn't go to the duck pond" and that she didn't believe the perpetrator had opened fire at Backstreet Cafe because "he was accepting and tolerant of people".

Reverend Fred Phelps, the leader of the Westboro Baptist Church of Topeka, Kansas, said that his family would protest at Overstreet's funeral. Phelps, whose group was known for their homophobic views and regularly protested at the funerals of gay people, AIDS victims, military veterans, and disaster victims, requested protection from local police through his lawyer for his planned protest. Reverend Jerry Falwell called Phelps "another idiot", condemned the shooting, and called for Ronald Gay's execution, but said that "preaching against the sin of homosexuality is the responsibility of every minister who takes the Bible seriously". Reverend Mel White said that he was "glad" Fred Phelps was going to be at the funeral because "at least in Fred Phelps we see what Jerry Falwell is really like at heart".

== Aftermath ==
A spokesperson for the Roanoke Police Department said that they planned to have officers stationed at Overstreet's funeral to provide security for the funeral goers and that the agency would do whatever it needed in order to provide protection for them. Fred Phelps failed to show up at the funeral due to apparent concerns that the local police would not provide protection for his group. About 50 officers from Vinton, Roanoke County, Virginia State Police, and the Roanoke County Sheriff's Department ultimately provided protection for the funeral, which was attended by more than 800 people, including about 200 CWA members, and it was conducted without protest, barring a passing motor vehicle with a banner that said, "Ronnie Gay for Pres." Vinton police chief Herb Cooley said of Phelps' no-show that Phelps had "got his media attention and didn't have to spend the money" and that Phelps had disrupted the community.

In 2016, Backstreet Bar closed, and was re-opened by the owner as the Front Row, a sports bar catering to punk and metal enthusiasts.

== See also ==
- Crime in Virginia
- History of violence against LGBTQ people in the United States
- LGBTQ rights in Virginia
- List of mass shootings in the United States (2000–2009)
