= 2007 Moscow, Idaho, shooting =

Mass shooting in Idaho, US

- Location: Moscow, Idaho, US
- Date: May 19–20, 2007; 11:22 p.m. – 1:00 a.m.
- Attack type: Mass shooting, mass murder, uxoricide, murder-suicide
- Weapons: AK-47 automatic rifle; Springfield Armory M1A semi-automatic rifle
- Deaths: 4 (including the perpetrator and his wife)
- Injuries: 3
- Perpetrator: Jason Hamilton

On the night of May 19–20, 2007, a mass shooting occurred in Moscow, Idaho, United States. Two people were killed and three others were injured before the perpetrator, 36-year-old Jason Hamilton, committed suicide. Prior to the shooting, Hamilton had killed his wife at their home.

== Shooting ==
The attack began at around 10 p.m. at Hamilton's home, where he shot and killed his wife, 30-year-old Crystal Hamilton.

At approximately 11:22 p.m., Hamilton drove to the Latah County Courthouse and fired approximately 75 to 125 rounds from an AK-47 automatic rifle and a Springfield Armory M1A semi-automatic rifle into the emergency dispatch center. Investigators believe this was a deliberate tactic to lure first responders into an ambush. Officer Lee Newbill was the first to arrive on the scene and was fatally shot. He was the first Moscow police officer killed in the line of duty since the city's incorporation in 1899.

At approximately 11:42 p.m., Hamilton walked towards the First Presbyterian Church across the street. The church's caretaker, 62-year-old Paul Bauer, had been smoking outside when he heard the gunshots. After briefly walking in direction of the Sheriff's Office, Bauer retreated into an office inside the church and called emergency services at 11:44 p.m. During the call, Hamilton shot Bauer six times in the back through a window. After firing a total of 60 to 80 gunshots inside the building, Hamilton went to an upper level of the church, spotting an additional police patrol retrieving Newbill's body. Officer Brannon Jordan fell off the back of the patrol vehicle and immediately sought cover near where Newbill had been shot. As Jordan was checking Newbill's shotgun, Hamilton fired once, striking the officer in the arm and lower back. Hamilton returned to the ground level and hid in the church's sanctuary.

At approximately 1:00 a.m. on May 20, a final shot was heard from within the church. SWAT teams entered at roughly 6:00 AM and found Hamilton dead from a self-inflicted gunshot wound to the head.

After the shooting, police later discovered a shotgun, a .22-caliber rifle and a .22-caliber handgun at his home.

== Victims ==
Deceased:

- Crystal Hamilton (30): The shooter's wife.
- Lee Newbill (48): Moscow Police officer.
- Paul Bauer (62): First Presbyterian Church caretaker.

Injured:

- Brannon Jordan: Latah County Sheriff's Deputy, shot while attempting to rescue Officer Newbill.
- Pete Husmann: A 20-year-old University of Idaho student who heard the shots and rushed toward the courthouse to help.
- Bill Shields: A second Moscow police officer who sustained minor injuries from bullet fragments.

== See also ==
- 2022 Idaho student murders – a mass stabbing that occurred in Moscow, Idaho
- 2025 Coeur d'Alene shooting – another ambush attack which happened in Idaho
- 2026 Twin Falls shooting – another mass shooting in Idaho
- List of mass shootings in the United States (2000–2009)
