= 2000 Route 30 vehicle shooting =

Mass shooting in New Jersey, U.S.

- Location: Atlantic County, New Jersey, U.S.
- Date: September 8, 2000 c. 4:00 a.m. (ET)
- Attack type: Mass shooting
- Weapon: AK-47
- Deaths: 3
- Injuries: 1
- Perpetrator: Lloyd Massey II

On September 8, 2000, four men driving along U.S. Route 30 just outside Atlantic City, New Jersey, United States were ambushed whilst awaiting a red light by an assailant with an AK-47. Three of them (Michael Demps, Richard White Jr., and Lamont Wilson), were killed, while the fourth (Terrence Harris) survived. The shooter, Lloyd Massey II, had previously gotten into a physical altercation with the men at a bar in Egg Harbor Township and discreetly followed them to Atlantic City in his car. Massey was convicted of three counts of murder in 2002 and sentenced to serve three life sentences.

== Shooting ==
At approximately 4:00 a.m., the men's vehicle, a 1989 Honda Accord, was stopped at a red light in the eastbound lane. The driver was 19-year-old Lamont Wilson, and his passengers were 26-year-old Richard White Jr., 21-year-old Terrence Harris, and 20-year-old Michael Demps. Lloyd Massey II, a 21-year-old casino security guard, was trailing not far behind and pulled in front of them. Armed with an AK-47 he had bought in November 1999, he exited the vehicle and shot out the men's windshield, with the first several shots striking White, who is believed to have died quickly. Immediately after, Wilson fled the vehicle, but Massey promptly shot him multiple times, and he collapsed in the street. Wilson had not put the vehicle in park, and it veered off into the marshes. Massey continued firing into the car and walked around to the rear-left seat, where Demps was sitting. It is believed that Demps had also tried to flee but was unable to due to the child lock. Massey shot out his window and struck him multiple times, and although Harris was still in the rear-right seat, Massey opted not to shoot him, instead running back to his vehicle and fleeing.

As the shooting occurred at a public intersection, there were a handful of eyewitnesses, but none intervened. At 4:04 a.m., several witnesses phoned 911. Police immediately responded, but little could be done; Wilson, White, and Demps were all pronounced dead at the scene. Harris was still in the vehicle at this time and did not sustain any gunshot wounds, although he was struck by pieces of broken glass. At least 24 shell casings were recovered from the scene.

Immediately after the shooting, Massey drove back to Egg Harbor and threw his gun into the Great Egg Harbor Bay to attempt to cover up his tracks. Massey kept a close eye on the investigation to see if and when investigators would implicate him. Through his uncle, Massey learned that detectives wanted to speak to him, and he fled to Georgia, where he would be arrested on September 10.

== Perpetrator ==
Lloyd Massey II (born September 4, 1979), the shooter, was a resident of Pleasantville, New Jersey. He was raised in Pleasantville and attended Pleasantville High School, where he played football and was named homecoming king his senior year. After high school, he worked as a part-time security guard at the Sands Atlantic City hotel and casino.

=== Motive ===
It is believed Massey ambushed the men as an act of revenge over a physical altercation with Demps at Fuller's Bar in Egg Harbor Township. At roughly 3:30 a.m., Demps called over Massey and started a fight with him. According to witnesses, Demps won the fight and severely embarrassed Massey.

== Massey's trial ==
Massey was convicted in 2002 and sentenced to serve three life sentences.

In 2010, he attempted to appeal his sentence on the grounds that an eyewitness had failed a Polygraph test and it had not been entered into evidence. His sentence was upheld on the grounds that the judges believed that disclosing the polygraph evidence would not have changed the result of the trial

== See also ==
- List of mass shootings in the United States (2000–2009)
