= Toy drive =

Charity event

A toy drive is a charity event that collects toys or money to be distributed to those in need.

== Overview ==
This is usually for the celebration of Christmas. Volunteers are brought together to sort through toys to wrap and sort for age appropriateness. Appeals are made in shopping centers, schools, and other places for the public to purchase toys and to meet certain goals. Many charities or organizations will orchestrate a seasonal effort on top of their usual practices. Many police departments, fire departments, and military groups are involved in these efforts. One of the most important and famous toy drives is Toys For Tots which is operated by the United States Marine Corps.
