= 2003 Ennis shooting =

Mass shooting in Montana, U.S.

- Footage of the shootout between Davis and officer Hildenstab. Davis is positioned behind the rear bumper of his sedan, aiming at Hildenstab.
- Location: Madison County, Montana, U.S.
- Date: June 14, 2003; 23 years ago (UTC−07:00)
- Target: Bystanders outside a bar in Ennis, responding law enforcement officers
- Attack type: Mass shooting; shootout
- Weapon: .45 caliber M1911 semi-automatic pistol
- Deaths: 1 (Jamie Roberts)
- Injuries: 10 (8 by gunfire, including the perpetrator)
- Perpetrator: George Harold Davis

The 2003 Ennis shooting was a mass shooting that occurred on June 14, 2003, when 44-year-old George Harold Davis opened fire on a group of people outside a bar in downtown Ennis, in Madison County, Montana, then engaged police officers in a high-speed chase and shootout. Davis killed one man and injured six other bystanders at the bar. He was then chased by a sheriff's deputy and highway patrol officer. The chase terminated on the Idaho/Montana state border. Davis was arrested and sentenced to eleven life terms, the longest prison sentence in Montana state history. The chase and shootout were captured on dashboard cameras installed within the two pursuing patrol vehicles.

== Events ==
=== Mass shooting ===
In the early hours of the morning, around 2 a.m., on Saturday, June 14, 2003, 44-year-old George Harold Davis drank alone at the Silver Dollar Saloon bar, on Main Street in Ennis, Madison County, Montana. After buying multiple alcoholic beverages and getting heavily intoxicated, Davis got more and more frustrated and was unable to pay for the drinks. Another patron, Michael Carroll, paid Davis' tab, hoping he would leave. Davis left the bar and walked over to his car, a gold Ford Taurus, which was parked just outside. He retrieved a .45 semi-automatic pistol from the vehicle and then opened fire on people outside the bar. He seriously injured six people (including Carroll) and fatally shot 27-year-old Jamie Roberts. After the shooting, Davis fled the scene in his car and drove for nearly 200 miles toward Ravalli County, Montana.

=== Police chase and shootout ===
At around 8 a.m. Ravalli County Sheriff Deputy Bernie Allestad spotted Davis speeding on U.S. Highway 93. Allestad pulled over Davis, who immediately leaped out of his vehicle and opened fire on Allestad. Allestad returned fire but was shot in the shoulder and became badly wounded. Davis was also hit in the abdomen during the brief shootout, but he managed to escape and speed away.

Davis entered Missoula County, Montana, where he encountered Missoula County sheriff deputy David Conway and tried to run him off the road in a head-on collision. Conway dodged avoided colliding with Davis and pursued him. Montana Highway Patrol officer Jason Hildenstab also joined in the pursuit. Hildenstab took the lead and chased after Davis at speeds of 100 miles an hour. Davis drove towards the Idaho border in an attempt to lose the police. Hildenstab had not had time to fill up with gas for the day when he was called to respond.

As Hildenstab approached Davis' car to potentially ram him, Davis slammed on his brakes and Hildenstab rear-ended the vehicle. Davis spun his vehicle around, exited his car, crouched behind his rear bumper and opened fire on Hildenstab with his .45 semi-automatic pistol. Hildenstab returned fire from the rear of his patrol vehicle. Conway then arrived and opened fire with a 12-gauge shotgun. Upon Conway's arrival, Davis fled the scene. Hildenstab's patrol vehicle became disabled and began releasing smoke, as it had been badly shot up by Davis during the shootout. Hildenstab abandoned his wrecked car and both he and Conway chased after Davis in Conway's patrol vehicle. Conway and Hildenstab pursued Davis westbound along U.S. Highway 12 towards the Idaho border. U.S. Army veteran and 25-year veteran Idaho state trooper Stan Wiggins Sr., who was accompanied by a game warden, was then informed by Conway to set up spike strips on the highway to stop Davis from escaping. Wiggins carried out the instruction and Davis drove directly over the spike strips. His vehicle came to a stop and Davis opened the door of his car. As he did, Conway accelerated his patrol vehicle towards Davis. Davis opened fire at the patrol vehicle as it approached him. Conway charged his vehicle at Davis at 60 miles an hour and rammed into the side of the car. Davis was injured and dropped his handgun during the collision and Hildenstab broke his leg. Both Conway and Hildenstab survived, as did Davis. Davis was arrested by Conway, Wiggins and the game warden, who rushed over to his car after the crash. Davis was too badly injured to resist arrest. When he was in custody, he casually asked Conway, "Did you guys have fun?", referring to the chase and gunfight. Conway replied, "Was it fun to you?" and Davis just said it was "a rush." As he was led to the police car, he said that he wished the officers had killed him in the crash.

== Victims ==
Jamie L. Roberts, a 27-year-old construction worker of Ennis, was the only fatality of Davis's shooting spree.

Six other bystanders were injured outside the bar in Ennis. All of the casualties were out of the hospital by July 3, 2003.

- Ginger Powers – Shot twice through the stomach.
- Michael Carroll – Shot in his pancreas.
- Matt Ortega – Hit by a bullet in his spleen.
- Isaiah Crowley – Shot four times in the attack.
- Tret Sutter – Shot through the right thigh.
- Gavin Faulkner – Suffered gunshot wounds to a hand and right leg.

== Perpetrator ==
George Davis
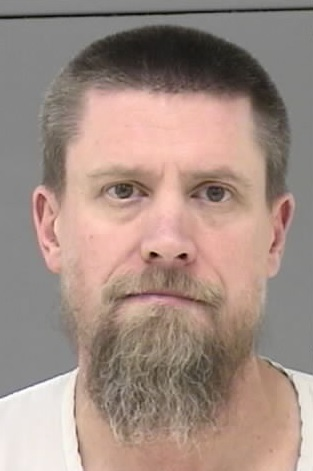
- Mugshot of George Davis
- Born: George Harold Davis; June 20, 1958 (age 68); Leavenworth, Kansas, U.S.
- Known for: Perpetrator of the Ennis shooting
- Status: Incarcerated at Saguaro Correctional Center
- Convictions: Deliberate homicide Attempted deliberate homicide (10 counts)
- Penalty: 11 life sentences without possibility of parole

George Harold Davis (born June 20, 1958) was identified as the man responsible for the shooting rampage in Ennis. He was a proponent of white supremacy and anti-Semitism. He was also a trained killer and a paramilitary veteran, who had served as a mercenary in Nicaragua.

Davis was born in Leavenworth, Kansas, and moved to Washington in the early 1990s. Prior to the shooting, Davis had only recently moved to the Ennis area from Washington. At the time of his shooting spree in Ennis, Davis worked as a ranch hand on a nearby ranch. Davis had also worked as a carpet installer in Washington throughout the 1990s.

Davis had a prior criminal history on record. Between 1994 and 1997, Davis received four separate restraining orders in Olympia, Washington, including one for harassing a staff member of the newspaper The Olympian. He reportedly wrote a letter to an Olympian reporter, saying the newspaper was a "criminal organization which was psychologically controlled by the Jews" and that "only white supremacism can save nature's finest." Davis also sent them a newsletter from the neo-Nazi group, National Alliance, which said, "We must halt the flow of Third World immigrants across our borders, and we must take whatever other steps are necessary to reclaim our cities from the hordes of non-Whites who have invaded them during the past 50 years."

A woman from the Washington area with whom Davis had tried to start a relationship claimed to have received neo-Nazi literature from him at her work and home address. She also got a restraining order against Davis at the time.

== Aftermath ==
Davis was arrested and sentenced to eleven life terms, the longest prison sentence in Montana state history. He will never be released from prison and is not eligible for parole. The reason for his rampage remains unclear. One possibility is because of a sudden medication withdrawal. Davis said he abruptly stopped taking the antidepressant drug Paxil in the days leading up to the shooting. His defense attorney Ed Sheehy Jr. argued that heavy drinking and withdrawals from the drug led to the initial shooting. But prosecutors argued that Davis was unrepentant for his crimes and was simply looking for excuses for his actions. Madison County Attorney Bob Zenker described Davis as evil, a racist, and a cop hater. He argued that Davis could not blame his crimes on medication and alcohol. Davis had no clear answer to why he carried out the rampage and claimed that he could not recall any of his actions on that specific day. He is currently imprisoned in Montana State Prison.

The chase and shootout with Davis was recorded by dashboard cameras installed within Conway and Hildenstab's patrol vehicles. The footage has been widely reported in the media and has been shown on many television documentaries, including: World's Most Amazing Videos, Disorderly Conduct: Video On Patrol, Hot Pursuit, Police In Pursuits, World's Wildest Police Videos, 16×9 and Under Fire.

== See also ==
- 2011 Grand Rapids shootings
- 2025 Anaconda shooting
- Kirkwood City Council shooting
- Brian Nichols
- 2005 Tyler courthouse shooting
