= 2005 Tyler courthouse shooting =

Mass shooting in Texas, U.S.

Coordinates: 32.3512°N 95.2999°W

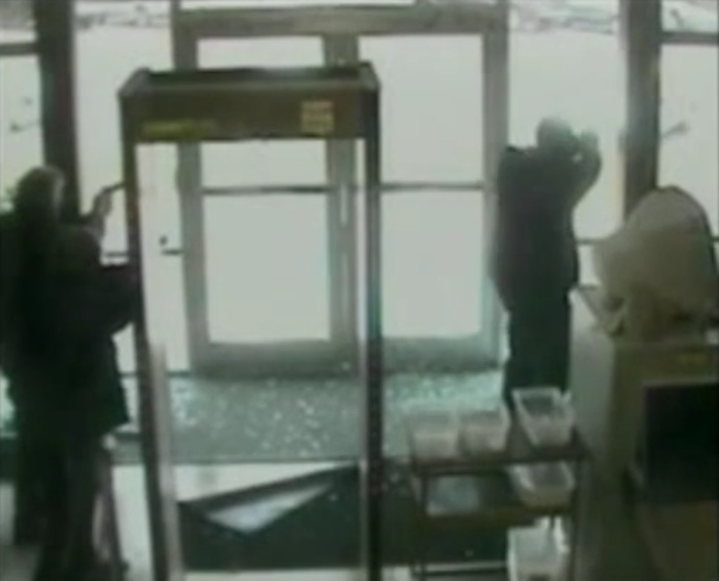
- Officers engage with Arroyo from inside the courthouse
- Location: Tyler, Texas, U.S.
- Date: February 24, 2005; 21 years ago (CST; UTC−06:00)
- Target: Perpetrator's ex-wife, responding law enforcement officers
- Attack type: Mass shooting, shootout, uxoricide
- Weapon: Norinco MAK-90 semi-automatic rifle
- Deaths: 3 (including the perpetrator)
- Injuries: 4
- Perpetrator: David Hernandez Arroyo Sr.
- Defender: Mark Alan Wilson

On February 24, 2005, David Hernandez Arroyo Sr. opened fire outside the courthouse in Tyler, Texas, United States, killing his ex-wife and wounding his son before engaging in a shootout with police and court officers. Arroyo used a Type 56S rifle to carry out the attack. A local resident, Mark Alan Wilson, attempted to intervene but was fatally shot. Arroyo was later killed by police following a high-speed pursuit.

== Details ==
=== Shootout begins ===
At the time of the shooting, Maribel Estrada and her 23-year-old son, David Hernandez Arroyo Jr., were entering the courthouse for a hearing regarding her ex-husband's failure to pay child support after their 2004 divorce. Estrada's lawyer later stated that his client did not believe her ex-husband to be dangerous.

Arroyo, who had parked and lain in wait near the courthouse, approached his ex-wife and son on the steps outside the Smith County Courthouse and fired on them with an AK-47 rifle. Estrada was hit in the head and killed instantly, and Arroyo's son was hit in the leg and wounded. Both fell to the ground at the rear courthouse steps.

Nearby law enforcement officers already present at the courthouse responded to the initial shots and began exchanging fire with Arroyo. At this point, the law enforcement officers were only armed with pistols, and Arroyo was able to wound several and force them to retreat.

=== Mark Alan Wilson ===
A local resident, Mark Alan Wilson, was in his downtown loft when he heard the shooting begin. He looked out his window and saw Arroyo at the courthouse steps engaged in a shootout with law enforcement. Wilson, who held a Texas concealed handgun permit, immediately armed himself with his Colt .45 caliber pistol, and left his residence to intervene in the gun battle. Because Arroyo was already engaged in a heated gun battle with sheriff's deputies and Tyler police officers, he did not see Wilson approach from behind.

As Wilson approached Arroyo from behind, Arroyo was taking aim at his son whom he had already shot in the leg and wounded. Acting to defend the life of Arroyo's son, Wilson fired a round from approximately 50 feet, which struck Arroyo in the back, causing him to stumble and taking his attention away from his son. A witness who saw Wilson's round strike Arroyo reported seeing "white puffs of powder-like substance" come from Arroyo's clothing. This is believed to be the first time Arroyo was hit or injured during his attack on the courthouse.

Wilson was forced to take cover behind Arroyo's truck in a prone position and exchanged fire with Arroyo. As Arroyo began to approach Wilson's position, he stood up from behind cover and fired again, hitting Arroyo. Unknown to Wilson, Arroyo was wearing a bulletproof vest, rendering Wilson's shots ineffective. Arroyo eventually fired a shot that struck Wilson, who faltered and fell from the view of witnesses, face down behind Arroyo's truck. Arroyo then walked up to Wilson and fired three more shots at him, killing him.

=== Pursuit and Arroyo's death ===
Officers from the Tyler Police Department, including Officer Wayne Allen was operating the pursuit vehicle with Sergeant Rusty Jacks, a trained sniper armed with a Colt AR-15 rifle, as his passenger, soon arrived on the scene. After 116 rounds had been fired outside the courthouse, 66 by Arroyo, 5 by Mark Alan Wilson, and 45 by police, the assailant attempted to flee and a pursuit ensued. The pursuit continued from the city streets of Tyler to a nearby highway.

At the terminus of the pursuit, Arroyo fired at the vehicle of Deputy Sheriff John Smith who had pulled closely behind Arroyo's truck during the pursuit. After taking fire, Deputy Smith returned fire with his vehicle still in motion and used his patrol car to ram Arroyo's truck. Arroyo stopped his vehicle, exited it, and attempted to fire upon Smith, whose patrol car had essentially come to a stop on the passenger side of Arroyo's truck after ramming it. Smith sped away to avoid Arroyo's shots and gunfire from other law enforcement officers, leaving Officers Allen and Jacks in the direct line of fire. With Arroyo now out of his vehicle, Sgt. Rusty Jacks exited Officer Allen's vehicle and fired five shots from his rifle, hitting Arroyo in the back of the head and killing him instantly as he attempted to get back into his vehicle.

== Aftermath ==
The shooting was widely covered by national news organizations and video from the incident is readily accessible on the Internet.

Mark Wilson has been widely credited as heroic for his actions, which are believed to have caused Arroyo to cease his attack and flee the area without murdering his son, and the Texas House unanimously adopted a resolution (HR. 740) on March 31, 2005, to honor him.

== Casualties ==
- Mark Alan Wilson and Maribel Estrada were killed at the shooting scene.
- David Hernandez Arroyo Jr. was wounded in the leg, but survived.
- Smith County sheriff's deputies Sherman Dollison, 28, and Marlin Suell, 38, were wounded during the incident.
- Tyler police officer Clay Perrett was wounded during the incident.

== See also ==
- 2003 Ennis shooting
- Brian Nichols, Fulton County, Georgia courthouse shooter
- Kirkwood City Council shooting
- Marin County courthouse incident
