= Oregon Community Foundation =

- Formation: 1973
- Headquarters: Portland, Oregon
- Methods: Donations and Grants
- President and CEO: Lisa Mensah
- Board of directors: Peter Bragdon, Board Chair
- Endowment: $3.02 billion
- Website: https://oregoncf.org/

The Oregon Community Foundation is a non-profit founded in 1973, with headquarters in Portland, and offices in Baker City, Bend, Eugene, Medford and Salem Oregon. Lisa Mensah is (CEO). Oregon Community Foundation has an endowment of US$ 3.02 billion (2024) The OCF works with individuals, families, businesses and organizations to create charitable funds to support community causes throughout Oregon. In 2024, OCF made grants totaling $174 million to 3,500 non-profit organizations, and helped more than 2,100 students with scholarships totaling over $10.1 million. According to philanthropy.org, it is among the top 50 largest community foundations in the United States.

In 2026, Oregon Community Foundation announced a $100 million Building Hope Fund to build more middle-income housing in Oregon.

== See also ==
- Community foundation
