= National Organization for Victim Advocacy =

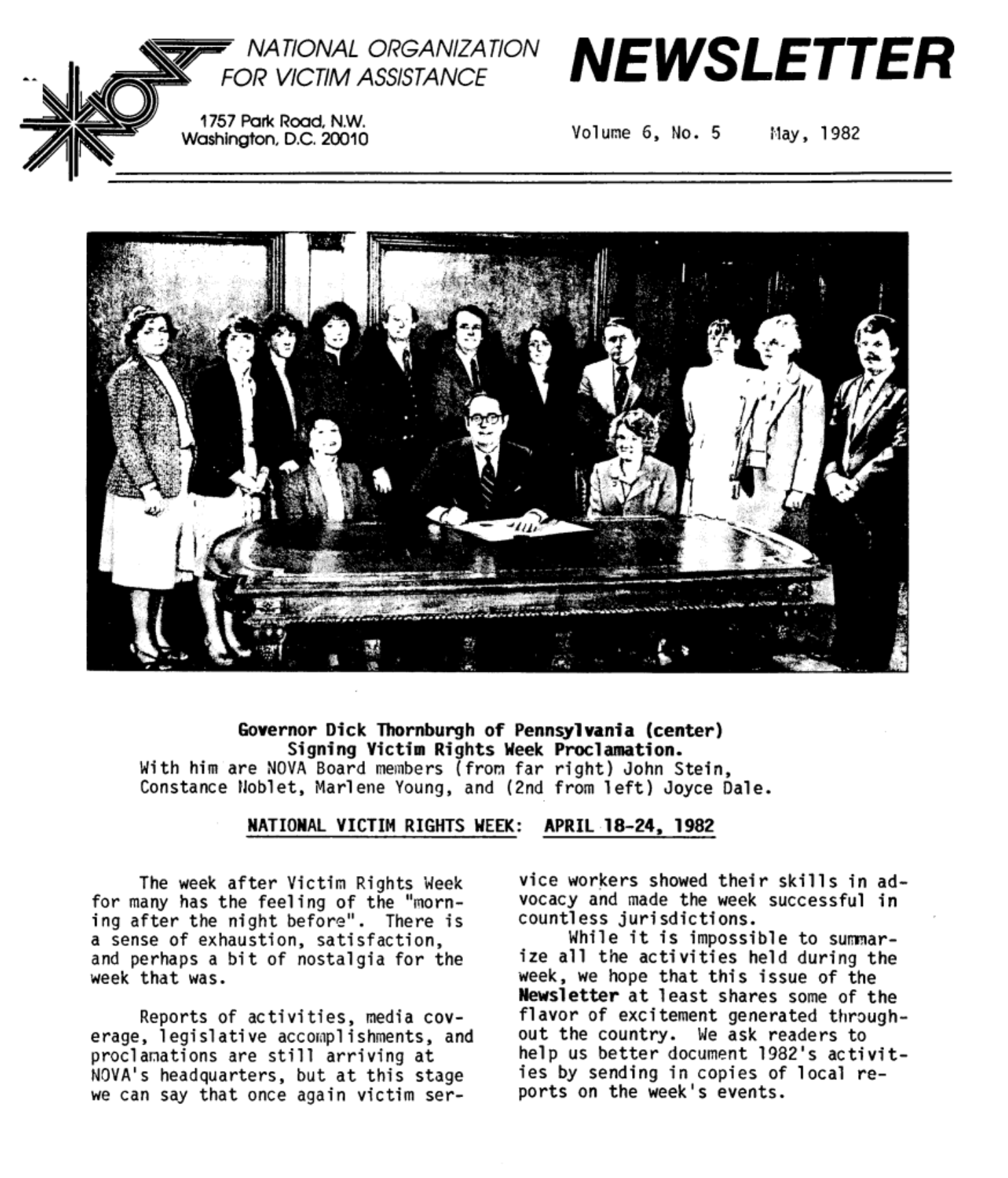
NOVA 1982 Newsletter Presenting Members

The National Organization for Victim Advocacy (NOVA), is a private non-profit organization founded in 1975 by professor John Dussich, centering its work around training advocates/social workers and crisis responders in response to the Victims Movement of the 1970s. NOVA is deemed to be the oldest wide-ranging victims' rights group. It recently changed its name from Assistance to Advocacy in 2024. Its purpose is to proactively contribute to benevolent assistance to victims whether it be requested, or in response to an emergency situation. NOVA holds its primary office in Alexandria, Virginia.

== Founders ==
John Dussich pioneered in the emerging field of victimology during this time, and was the architect in the notion of victim advocacy, establishing the first program in Fort Lauderdale in 1975 and the second program in Fresno in 1976.

Dr. Marlene Young acted as a founding member in 1979–1981. She has a degree in both law and psychology, and specializes in the subject area of victimology. She has advocated for legislation further supporting victims' rights and provided crisis response services through her role as president of NOVA. Dr. Young has held the role of executive director since 1981.

Information regarding the founding members is scarce, and academic literature steers more towards its broader implementation by the federal executive department of the U.S. government and Grassroots Organizations.

== Institutionalizing victim support ==
The 1970s in the US was characterized by a crime wave. In 1974, Director of the Federal Law Enforcement Assistance Administration (LEAA) Donald E. Santarelli sought to reform the criminal justice system in the midst of rising crime, which led to his discovery of Frank Cannavale's research. Cannavale was a senior research associate in criminology in Washington DC, at the Institute for Law and Social Research. His findings were that the leading cause of prosecution failure being the loss of witnesses as they stopped helping a justice system that was not accommodating to their needs.

This led to the establishment of three demonstration projects in 1974 in District Attorneys’ offices, as notification and support systems to victims and witnesses. Inspiration in developing these basic victim supporting practices was derived from grassroots programs and newer law enforcement ones following the rise of the victims movement. Prosecutor staff i.e. Assistant District/State Attorneys, law clerks, and investigators were trained in crisis intervention to facilitate court proceedings by supporting victims. Also provided resources to social service and victim compensation programs. Notification processes went from informing victims of court dates to developing on-call systems, and integrating victims’ input on bail and dismissals, sentences, compensation and protective measures along with parole hearings.

These developments became categorized under a “Prescriptive Package” for victims and witnesses as provided by the LEAA, marking a turning point in institutionalising victim support. The LEAA funded several police departments to further expand this newfound project. Victim-centred training programs were developed through academic literature publications.

== Origin of NOVA ==
In the late 1970s, advocacy groups such as Families and Friends of Missing Persons, Parents Of Murdered Children, Mothers Against Drunk Driving, Protect the Innocent in Indiana, and Justice for Victims/Homicide Victims formed. Justice for Victims at the time had lobbied for one of the first state constitutional amendments for victims’ rights, successfully passed in Florida in 1988. These 5 informal alliance forces reflect the context in which NOVA was formally incorporated in 1975, to synergize with the objectives and hopes of seeking justice associated with the victims movement. Following NOVA's founding in 1975, its first national conference was hosted after a year, which became an annual occurrence. The National Organization for Victim Advocacy may be described as a consortium, due to it overseeing several programs and groups.

NOVA came about from the ideas that emerged from the first national conference in Fort Lauderdale on victim assistance in 1973 as funded by LEAA. The concept of NOVA was initially to support the expansion of networks and continuation of national conferences from 1976 onward to create space for training sessions for trainees working with victims. NOVA's creation was sponsored by LEAA, a branch of the U.S. Department of Justice that had the objective of funding projects catering to the amelioration of the treatment of victims and witnesses, which fell under the up-and-coming field of Victimology. The basic practices rooted in the earlier demonstration projects in district attorney offices were further developed and solidified into academic literature and trainings. The late 1970s was marked by the start of victim assistance programs across several states, along with ten having a network of programs. Service was defined by 6 components: Crisis response, counselling practices, aid in criminal justice proceedings, restoration and compensation. In 1980, NOVA created a policy platform on victim's rights and initiated a National Campaign for Victim Rights in response to external pressures, in order to create a pathway for facilitated and enabled access for victims to the justice system. The Campaign incorporated a National Victims' Rights week as sanctioned by President Ronald W. Reagan in 1981. After exponential advancements in victim aid created a network of institutions through federal funding, a shift in focus occurred which lead to the defunding of LEAA in 1979.

A conflict emerged amongst grassroots programs and those institutionalized in the criminal justice system due to the misalignment of aims between law enforcement agencies and crime victims with regards to seeking legislative change vs changes in the executive branch via policy and procedural implementations. The now limited resources prompted the formation of new national organizations such as: the National Coalition Against Sexual Assault, which was established at NOVA's annual conference in 1978. Additionally the National Coalition Against Domestic Violence was formed with the intent of providing a shelter system. Though rapid, the victim's movement's further institutional development was treading on uncertain ground due to the dissolution of several programs. Activist groups upheld the momentum which allowed for growth in the following sectors: public policy, public dissemination of information and program implementation. External pressure from victim advocates led to further state action by California for example, which became the first state to fund victim assistance in 1980. Wisconsin followed this notion in passing a Victims’ Bill of Rights at this time. In 1982 the president implemented Frank Carrington's, from the Attorney General's Task Force, recommendation of a Presidential Task Force on Victims of Crime. Senator H. John Heinz simultaneously supported the principle of rights for victims via his position as chair of the Senate Aging Committee. He put this proposal in a federal bill which reached unanimous consent on the 12th of October 1982.

Lois Haight Herrington, chair of the President's Task Force on Victims of Crime in 1982 and former prosecutor, designed the Victims of Crime Act (VOCA) 1984. She also developed the Program Management Team for Victims of Crime, now known as the Office for Victims of Crime, a branch within the U.S. Department of Justice. General Kenneth Eikenberry, who was the Washington State Attorney General at the time, proposed a federal constitutional amendment for victims’ rights. The Task Force on Victims of Crime wrote a Final Report encompassing four initiatives. The first being funding compensation and assistance programs for victims which helped push for the adoption of the Victims of Crime Act. VOCA initiated the Crime Victims Fund, which sponsored the two victim programs mentioned. The second initiative underlined by the report consisted of proposals to criminal justice system experts and those in interdisciplinary fields as to how they could ameliorate victim handling. Then an additional Task Force focusing on violence in families was suggested, which created the Attorney General's Task Force on Family Violence in 1983. Fourth and lastly, Kenneth Eikenberry's amendment proposal was recommended in the Task Force report which is what led to the creation of the National Victims’ Constitutional Amendment Network (NVCAN) in 1986 with the objective of making amendments for crime victims’ rights on a federal level.

The Office of Justice, another branch from the U.S. Department of Justice that provides resources and crime research, worked with external groups like NOVA to administer the recommendations four years after the publication of the Task Force's Final Report. The Victims of Crime Act provided funding to states in 1986 along with training development for justice system experts and service program criteria for victims. Training was provided on a regional level across the United States. Victimology became further embedded in educational fields as a pursuit of knowledge through the issuance of the first bachelor's degree with a Major in Victimology and a Victim Service Certificate Program provided by California State University in Fresno.

This momentum earned global acclaim as the pursuit of restorative justice in supporting victims manifested itself in the United Nations implementing a Declaration of Basic Principles of Justice for Victims of Crime and Abuse of Power in 1985.

NOVA and the Office for Victims of Crime (OVC) formed a Model Victim Assistance Program Brief between 1986 and 1988 as a resource management tool for programs. This tool underscored eight fundamental services programs should have available: crisis response, advocacy and counselling, assistance during criminal investigations and during prosecution, further aid after case disposition, crime aversion, educating the public sphere, and training associated advocate experts.

By 1990, every state adopted a Bill of rights institutionalizing victim assistance through legislative funding and developing training and victim support programs.

== Purpose ==
NOVA's founding is based on a framework of four principles: providing service to its members; advocating for victims rights and services on the level of local legislation, executive agencies, and on state as well as federal scales; being a resource for victims and endorsing professionals; and as initially stated, to provide service to those who call the NOVA offices or be present in states of emergency. As illustrated by the dense series of events surrounding the institutionalisation of victims' rights, NOVA played a crucial role in managing and guiding newly-formed victim support programs with its research and training tools as sponsored by the branches of the U.S. federal executive department of justice.

== Initiatives ==
In 1982, the Presidential task force was pushing for the constitutional protection for victims' rights on a federal level by creating distinct rights for crime victims. NOVA sponsored a meeting with Mothers Against Drunk Driving (MADD), which resulted in the creation of the National Victims' Constitutional Amendment Network (NVCAN) by national victims' organizations and activists present. NVCAN was intended to lead and coordinate the attempt to amend the constitution. This was not a success, but several laws were passed to extend victims' rights between states nevertheless.

== First Crisis Response Teams for Victims ==
NOVA pioneered in creating the first crisis response teams for victims in response to the 1986 Edmond, Oklahoma post office mass shooting, that killed 14 people and injured half a dozen. These response teams were composed of a group of interdisciplinary professionals such as psychologists, law enforcement officers, social workers, victim advocates, religious leaders, and doctors. The response teams were involved in proactively aiding communities that suffered from serious crimes and acts of terror i.e. mass murders and bombings.

Three crisis response teams trained and examined over 1,000 emergency respondents, educator and school kids subsequent to the 1995 bombing of the Alfred P. Murrah Federal Building in Oklahoma City.

== Training ==
Between 1986 and 1998, NOVA offered training and assisting initiatives in over 15 states and sent crisis response teams to 125 communities. 300 communities have received technical assistance in the wake of crisis situations. Crisis response teams were also placed in Japan, Canada, Bosnia, and Croatia. This displays NOVA's involvement in victim assistance transnationally in response to crisis issues. Trainings were conducted before the 1996 Summer Olympics in Atlanta, Georgia. NOVA's training projects for victim advocates and volunteers were funded by the Office for Victims of Crime (OVC) at this time, covering national and international crisis support. Specifically, they focused on aiding foreign nationals victimized in the United States. The trainees were essential for victim support after the bombing occurrence during the Olympics in Centennial Park, Atlanta.

== Intervention in the aftermath of tragedy ==
- In the 1980s, NOVA hosted support group meetings with the family members of U.S. hostages in Iran and Lebanon, along with creating a hostage family newsletter and facilitating contacting governmental services.
- In 1987 NOVA established a National Crisis Response Team Training Institute to train service providers for crisis response.
- In 1990, the organization published Coping with the Iraq/Kuwait Crisis: A Handbook dedicated to loved ones of Americans held in Iraq and Kuwait.

== Current status ==
In 2024, NOVA changed its name, switching Assistance to Advocacy as iterated previously. NOVA has also instituted the Victim Advocacy Corps (VAC), sponsored by the Office for Victim of Crime (OVC). The objective of this program consists of training the future generation of victim service leaders. The target group is thus college students whom of which have the opportunity to follow an advocacy training program with credentials, mentoring, and a traineeship in a victim service agency. The year also celebrated NOVA's 50th Annual Training Event, along with its first National Summit on the Professionalisation of Victim Advocacy and the National Advocate Credentialing Program (NACP). More than 25 national Subject Matter Experts were present at the headquarters in Alexandria, Virginia. the Office for Victims of Crime sponsored the Community Crisis Response program under NOVA in 1994, which up until now has led to more than 260 telecommunications aiding communities in crisis by providing crisis response teams or sending material aid.

NOVA continues to expand its versatile branch of advocacy through training programs and crisis response team expansions.
