= 2009 Saipan shootings =

Spree shooting in the Northern Mariana Islands

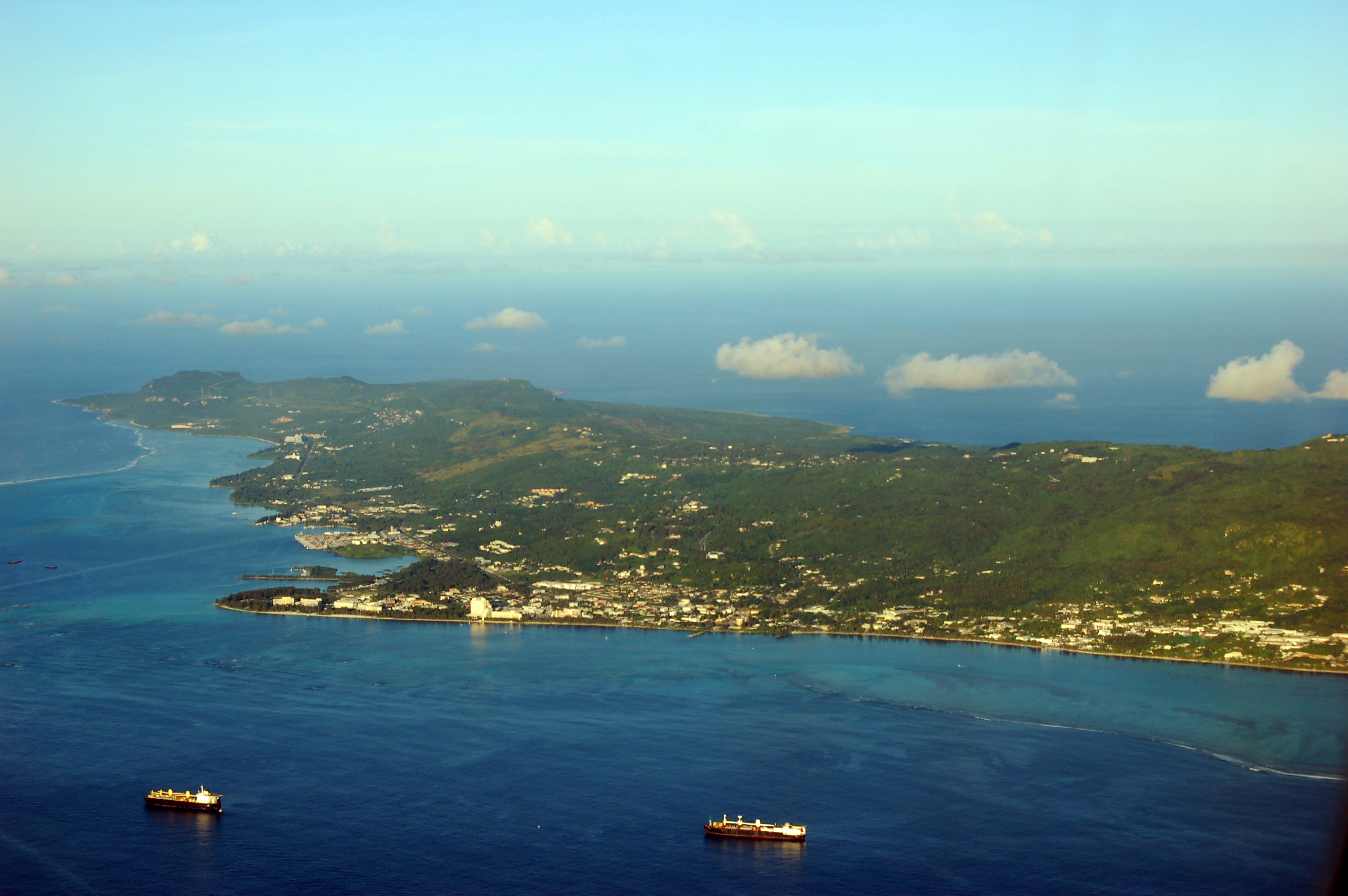
- Aerial view of northern Saipan, where the shootings took place
- Location: Saipan, Commonwealth of the Northern Mariana Islands, United States
- Date: November 20, 2009; 11:21 – c. 11:51 a.m. (UTC-10)
- Attack type: Spree shooting; mass murder; murder-suicide; drive-by shooting; mass shooting
- Weapons: .223-caliber rifle; .410 shotgun; .22 WMR rifle (unused); Long gun (unused)
- Deaths: 5 (including the perpetrator)
- Injuries: 9
- Perpetrator: Li Zhongren
- Motive: Frustration over financial situation

On November 20, 2009, a spree shooting took place at two locations on Saipan, in the United States commonwealth of the Northern Mariana Islands. Four people, including two children were killed, and nine others were injured before the perpetrator, 42-year-old Li Zhongren, killed himself upon police arrival.

== Shootings ==
The first shooting took place at 11:21 a.m. at a shooting range in Kannat Tabla. The gunman opened fire on a group of two men and three children, who were at the range to prepare a birthday party. Eight gunshots were fired using a rifle and shotgun. The two adults, a four-year-old boy, and a 19-month-old girl were killed while a four-year-old girl was injured by a gunshot to the chest. All five were related to each other; the adults were uncle and nephew with their respective children. The family were relatives of the shooting range's former owner, and lived close to the range.

The perpetrator then left the scene in a white Toyota Previa van and drove several miles to Marpi, to the site of the Last Command Post Park, which was the location of Japan's last base for military commanders during World War II. About 60 people were taking pictures of the area. At 11:30 a.m., he fired his rifle thirty times at two tourist groups from inside his van. Seven tourists, consisting of five adults and two children, as well as a tour guide, all South Korean nationals, were injured by gunfire.

Afterwards, he doused the van's interior with gasoline and set it on fire before walking north up the Banzai Cliff, firing twice more at the tourists at the cliff's monument. Upon arriving along the edge of the cliff, he committed suicide by shooting himself in the head with his rifle as police closed in. A search of the van's remains recovered three additional rifles and more than 750 rounds of ammunition. The shootings took place over the course of approximately thirty minutes and fired 41 rounds in total. Written notes were found at the shooting range, the exact contents of which were not to be released.

== Victims ==
Four people were killed and nine others were injured. The fatalities as well as one of the injured, all of whom were shot at the first location, were residents of Saipan, while the others were visiting from South Korea. The injured were treated at the Commonwealth Healthcare Corporation, with one Korean national, who was in critical condition, being flown from the islands to Seoul National University Hospital for surgery for a spine injury, which resulted in paraplegia. Investigators believed that the victims were targeted at random. Three of the dead were buried in Marpi, while another was repatriated to his ancestral home in Tinian. By November 25, the injured Saipan child was moved to a pediatric ward while the remaining seven injured were released, with most having returned to South Korea.

=== Killed ===
- Enrique Naputi, 30
- Richard Borja Naputi, 22
- Vince Rosario, 5
- Korina Naputi, 1

=== Injured ===
- Dolores Naputi, 4
- Park Jae-hyung, 39
- Kim Juk Sik, 38
- Kim Man Soo, 38
- Kim Joon Hyung, 8
- Kim Seo Yoon, 4
- Three unnamed people

== Perpetrator ==
Undated photo of Li

The gunman was identified as 42-year-old Li Zhongren (Chinese: 李中仁), whose name was also rendered as Lee Zhong Ren. Li, a Chinese national of Korean descent, was previously a garment worker in As Lito for Rifu Corp. and Kyung Seung Co. Ltd. In 2008, he became a marketing representative for Rifu and was transferred to Kannat Tabla Shooting Range. The same year, Li filed a labor case against the shooting range's owner, Augustin C. Deleon Guerrero, over unpaid wages, which was decided in favor of Deleon Guerrero in May 2009. Shortly after, Deleon Guerrero died and in early 2009, the shooting range closed down. Since then, Li had been living at the shooting range as the site's caretaker. He was known to have voiced discontent over his failed attempts at opening another shooting range. An acquaintance stated that Li was "troubled with his labor status", but otherwise maintained a regular social life. The van he traveled in during the shootings was still registered to his deceased employer. The rifles used in the shootings are believed to have been taken from the shooting range.

It had been reported that he left a written note, variously described as a suicide note or last will, which stated "Negotiations for business have failed". Police officials believed that the shootings, reported as premeditated, were sparked by a frustration over financial issues.

While Li's identity was confirmed the day of the shooting, Saipan authorities initially only described the shooter as "a contract worker in his 30s or 40s from Asia". The Pacific News Center reported Li's name and identity the same day. Following initial difficulties, Li's family were notified by Saipan police through the Consulate-General of China, Los Angeles, whereupon it was agreed to have Li's remains returned to Heilongjiang.

== Investigation ==
The FBI and ATF took charge in determining the motive. South Korean government officials had already discounted terrorism as a factor.

== Reactions ==
The Governor of the Northern Mariana Islands Benigno Fitial said of the shooting, "My heart and prayers go out to the families and friends of the victims in today's shooting and most especially to those that were fatally wounded. The commonwealth has never experienced a tragic situation like this, and we are saddened by the appalling action of a single individual that has caused so much harm to our peaceful island community." Saipan Congressman Gregorio Sablan also commented, "The security we take for granted in our island homes has been broken by this senseless act of violence." Lieutenant Governor of the Northern Mariana Islands, Eloy Inos, told reporters, "This is an unfortunate but isolated incident. It happened for reasons unbeknownst to us, but we can handle this type of situation." Following the announcement that South Korean tourists were among the injured, this led to fears that tourism rates would drop at Saipan. Schools across the island were shut down for the day out of safety concerns.
