= 2001 Navistar shooting =

Mass shooting in Illinois

- Location: 41.9113°N 87.8797°W; Melrose Park, Illinois, U.S.
- Date: February 5, 2001 c. 9:50 a.m. – c. 10:02 a.m. (ET)
- Target: Co-workers
- Attack type: Mass shooting, murder-suicide, mass murder, workplace shooting
- Weapons: SKS semi-automatic rifle; .38 Special revolver; 12-gauge Remington 870 shotgun; .30 caliber semi-automatic rifle
- Deaths: 5 (including the perpetrator)
- Injuries: 4
- Perpetrator: William Daniel Baker

On February 5, 2001, a mass shooting occurred at a Navistar engine plant in Melrose Park, Illinois, when former employee William Daniel Baker entered the facility and fatally shot four employees and wounded four others with an SKS rifle before committing suicide. At the time, Baker was involved in a criminal case involving a conspiracy to steal machinery from Navistar. He had been convicted of crimes related to the plot months before the shooting and was due to turn himself into custody on February 6.

== Shooting ==
At approximately 9:45 a.m. on February 5, 2001, Baker drove his car to the sliding iron gate northwest of the facility on Armitage Avenue. Armed with four weapons, including an SKS rifle, a shotgun, and a hunting rifle all stuffed together in a golf bag, he attempted to persuade a female security guard to let him enter and claimed the bag contained belongings that he was giving to a friend. Once the guard asked if she could inspect the bag, Baker brandished a .38 special revolver and demanded entrance to the facility. She obliged and Baker entered the building, which at the time housed over 800 employees.

Once he infiltrated a diesel engine testing room, Baker brandished his rifle and began shooting. There, seven employees were shot, including three who were killed; supervisor Daniel Dorsch, 52, and technicians Robert Wehrheim, 47, and Michael Brus, 48. Several employees who witnessed the attack began running and alerting the other workers. Meanwhile, Baker continued to wander the facility looking for victims room by room. Approximately 8 to 12 minutes later, Baker entered an office room where he fatally shot a fourth employee, test engineer William Garcia, 43. After discharging 25 to 30 bullets from both the SKS and the revolver, he turned the revolver on himself and committed suicide.

After officers made their way into the facility, the four other workers who were shot were rushed to get treatment. Two of them, 45-year-old Carl Swanson and 22-year-old Matt Kusch, were treated at Gottlieb Memorial Hospital and survived. The other two, 24-year-old Mujtaba Aidroos and 26-year-old Bryan Snyder, were treated at Loyola University Medical Center and also survived.

== Victims ==
=== Killed ===
- Daniel Thomas Dorsch, 52, of Elmwood Park
- Robert Edward Wehrheim, 47, of Hanover Park
- Michael Victor Brus, 48, of Hinckley
- William Allen Garcia, 43, of Carpentersville

=== Injured ===
- Carl Swanson, 45, of Des Plaines
- Mujtaba H. Aidroos, 24, of Roselle
- Bryan Snyder, 26, of Maywood
- Matt Kusch, 22

== Perpetrator ==
Baker in an undated mugshot

William Daniel Baker (March 15, 1934 – February 5, 2001), the perpetrator of the shooting, had previously worked at the facility. Baker was born in Evergreen, Conecuh County, Alabama, and was raised in West Chicago, Illinois. He was hired in 1955 and worked as a forklift operator and tool room attendant until his firing in 1994 after he conspired with a group of his co-workers to steal truck engines and parts from the facility. Many of Baker's acquaintances and old co-workers described him as a "bully."

After Baker was fired in 1994, he was charged in federal court with conspiracy to commit theft relating to the plot. In November 2000, he pleaded guilty to the charge and was sentenced to serve five months in federal prison, followed by five months of home confinement. He was due to surrender to the Federal Bureau of Prisons on February 6, one day after the shooting. Baker was also a registered sex offender after pleading guilty in 1998 to having a sexual relationship with an underage girl. Due to this, he was forbidden to own a firearm.

== See also ==
- 2003 Chicago warehouse shooting
- Gun violence in the United States
