= 2003 Chicago warehouse shooting =

Mass shooting in Chicago, Illinois

- Salvador Tapia
- Location: 41.8230785°N 87.6421681°W; Chicago, Illinois, U.S.
- Date: August 27, 2003; 23 years ago c. 8:30 a.m. – 10:00 a.m. (CDT)
- Target: Co-workers
- Attack type: Mass shooting, mass murder, workplace shooting
- Weapon: Walther PP .380 ACP semi-automatic pistol
- Deaths: 7 (including the perpetrator)
- Injuries: 0
- Perpetrator: Salvador Tapia

On August 27, 2003, a mass shooting occurred at Windy City Core Supply in the South Side of Chicago, Illinois. Salvador Tapia, who had been fired from the company months before, shot and killed six people before being killed by responding officers.

== Background ==
Windy City Core Supply was an auto parts supply warehouse located at 3912 S. Wallace St. in Chicago. The perpetrator of the shooting, 36-year-old Mexican-born Salvador Tapia, was fired from the company in March 2003 for "ten different reasons", including frequently showing up late to work and often missing entire days. His former boss claimed his attitude changed dramatically for the worse around September 2002.

Tapia had an extensive criminal record, including a 1989 conviction for unlawful use of a weapon and numerous arrests for threatening and assaulting his family, girlfriends, and a neighbor. His driver's license was revoked in 2000 after two years of suspension for a drunk driving arrest. Despite his lengthy record, Tapia was reported to have served no time in prison.

After being fired from the warehouse, Tapia would leave "drunken ramblings" on the office answering machine.

== Shooting ==
On August 27, 2003, Tapia returned to his former workplace at around 8:30 a.m. and tied employee Eduardo Sanchez to a metal bar at gunpoint, telling him that he would not kill him and that he was going to "make these people pay". Tapia then waited and fatally shot six employees as they entered through the front door. After Tapia shot himself and smeared his own blood on his face, Sanchez escaped through a back staircase and ran to a nearby restaurant to call the police.

As law enforcement arrived at the scene, Tapia went outside and fired three shots at them before going back inside the building and emerging to exchange gunfire a second time. Chicago's Hostage Barricade and Terrorist Team entered the building and navigated the maze of steel drums and crates. Tapia was found hiding and was ordered to drop his weapon; he refused and was fatally shot by officers. He was struck by 7–9 bullets.

A Greyhound bus ticket and several handwritten notes in Spanish were found in Tapia's pockets, which contained vague threats to his girlfriends and were described by investigators as "cryptic" and "difficult to decipher". The weapon used in the shooting, a Walther PP .380 caliber handgun, was likely bought illegally or stolen, as it had been originally sold in 1966 and was last recorded during its legal registration in 1983.

== Victims ==
The identities of the deceased, not including the perpetrator, were:

- Alan Earl Weiner, 50
- Howard Neal Weiner, 59, brother of Alan
- Daniel Melbourne "Danny" Weiner, 30, son of Howard
- Calvin Ramsey, 44
- Robert Taylor, 53
- Juan Valles, 35

== See also ==
- 2001 Navistar shooting
- List of rampage killers (workplace killings)
