= Grease Monkey (business) =

American automotive service center chain

Grease Monkey International, Inc.
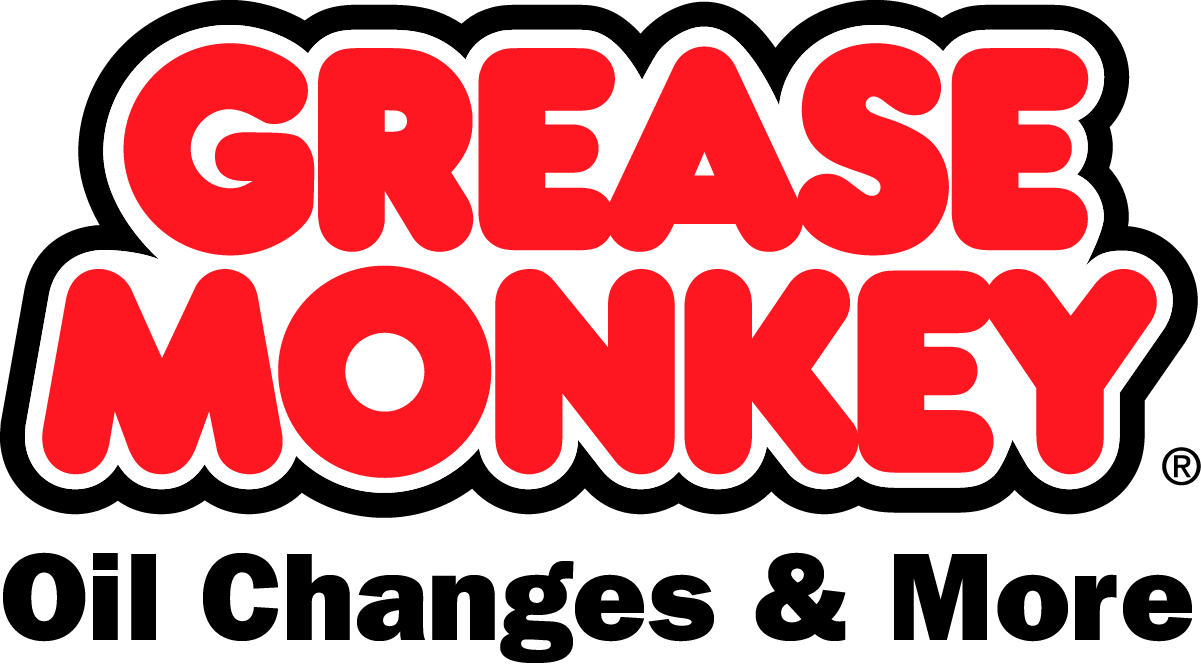
- The 2015-present logo
- Type: Privately
- Industry: Automotive Services
- Founded: 1978
- Headquarters: Denver, Colorado, U.S.

Grease Monkey International, Inc. is an independent American franchisor of automotive service centers offering oil changes, preventive maintenance, and other car care services.

The company rebranded as FullSpeed Automotive in September 2017. FullSpeed Automotive acts as a parent company for Grease Monkey franchises.

== History ==
Founded in 1978 by Robert D. Palmer Jr. and headquartered in Denver, Grease Monkey International, Inc. currently has more than 460 centers operating in the United States, Latin America, and China.

Grease Monkey International, Inc. initially operated as a subsidiary of Grease Monkey Holding Corporation. On December 31, 2013, Grease Monkey Holding Corporation was merged into Grease Monkey International, with Grease Monkey International being the surviving corporation.

In September 2013, Grease Monkey announced it acquired the assets and franchise contracts of LubePro's International, a 30-store chain of fast lubrication and automotive maintenance centers located in Illinois, Minnesota, Tennessee and Wisconsin.

In September 2017, Grease Monkey International rebranded as FullSpeed Automotive.

== Services ==
Grease Monkey began offering an EcoPower full service oil change in 2007 at participating locations. In April 2012, The National Oil & Lube News featured Grease Monkey franchisees Roger Bouchard and Champe Granger for their "Going Green" efforts. Celebrating one year of being green, Bouchard and Granger began the green initiatives as a way to give back to their community and provide customers with environmentally-conscious options to maintain their vehicles.
