= List of mass shootings in the United States in the 2020s =

Most notable mass shootings in the contiguous United States in the 2020s

This is a list of the most notable mass shootings in the United States that have occurred between 2020 until now. Mass shootings are incidents involving several victims of firearm-related violence. The precise inclusion criteria are disputed, and there is no broadly accepted definition. Only shootings that have Wikipedia articles of their own are included in this list. Detailed lists of shootings can be found per-year at their respective pages.

The Gun Violence Archive, a nonprofit research group that tracks shootings and their characteristics in the United States, defines a mass shooting as an incident in which four or more people, excluding the perpetrator(s), are shot in one location at roughly the same time, with the FBI having a minimum of three. The Congressional Research Service narrows that definition further, only considering what it defines as "public mass shootings", and only considering victims as those who are killed, excluding any victims who survive. The Washington Post and Mother Jones use similar definitions, with the latter acknowledging that their definition "is a conservative measure of the problem", as many rampages with fewer fatalities occur. The crowdsourced Mass Shooting Tracker project uses a looser definition than the Gun Violence Archive's definition: four people shot in one incident regardless of the circumstances.

Larger documentation of mass shootings in the United States has occurred through independent and scholarly studies such as the Stanford University Mass Shootings in America Data Project.

== Definitions ==
There are varying definitions of a mass shooting. Listed roughly from broadest to most restrictive:

- Stanford MSA Data Project: three or more persons shot in one incident, excluding the perpetrator(s), at one location, at roughly the same time. Excluded are shootings associated with organized crime, gangs or drug wars.
- Mass Shooting Tracker: 4+ shot in one incident, at one location, at roughly the same time.
- Gun Violence Archive/Vox: 4+ shot in one incident, excluding the perpetrator(s), at one location, at roughly the same time.
- Mother Jones: 3+ shot and killed in one incident, excluding the perpetrator(s), at a public place, excluding gang-related killings.
- The Washington Post: 4+ shot and killed in one incident, excluding the perpetrator(s), at a public place, excluding gang-related killings.
- Congressional Research Service: 4+ shot and killed in one incident, excluding the perpetrator(s), at a public place, excluding gang-related killings, acts carried out that were inspired by criminal profit, and terrorism.

== List of mass shootings (2020s) ==
=== 2026 ===
Date	Location	Dead	Injured	Total	Description
November 12, 2026	Washington, D.C.	2 (Note: Including the perpetrator or suspect)	5	7	2026 Logan Circle shooting: A man opened fire inside a gym in the Logan Circle neighborhood, killing another man before fleeing and shooting five others. After barricading himself inside his apartment, he fatally shot himself.
October 15, 2026	Bend, Oregon	5	2	7	2026 Silver Rail Elementary School shooting: A 16-year-old boy entered the school and opened fire, killing four people, including three children, and injuring at least two others. Later, a bystander fatally shot the gunman.
October 9, 2026	Erie, Pennsylvania	10 (Note: Including an unborn child)	0	10	2026 Erie shooting: A man opened fire at a home, killing eight people, including two children and a pregnant woman before engaging in a standoff with police and dying from a self-inflicted gunshot wound.
October 4, 2026	Vienna, Georgia	2	26	28	2026 Vienna, Georgia, shooting: Two people were killed and 42 injured, 26 from gunfire, at a shooting at a homecoming block party. Multiple people were also struck by vehicles as people fled the shooting.
August 23, 2026	Yellowstone County, Montana	9	0	9	2026 Billings shooting: A man fatally shot eight of his relatives, including four children, during a family dinner at a home, and then set the home ablaze. The shooter was found dead from a self-inflicted gunshot wound in the back yard of the home.
August 1, 2026	Twin Falls, Idaho	4	7	11	2026 Twin Falls shooting: Three people were killed and seven others were injured when a man opened fire at an In-N-Out Burger restaurant before he died by suicide.
July 26, 2026	Seattle, Washington	3	4	7	2026 Seattle Center shooting: Two people are believed to have exchanged gunfire with another person at the Bite of Seattle festival at the Seattle Center, resulting in the deaths of three people, including one of the alleged gunmen, and injuries to four others.
July 24, 2026	Grand Haven Charter Township, Michigan	8	0	8	Karolkiewicz family murders: A man shot his wife and their six children before setting their house on fire and fatally shooting himself southeast of Grand Haven.
June 6, 2026	Toledo, Ohio	0	12	12	2026 Old West End Festival shooting: Twelve people were injured, two critically, in a shooting near the Old West End Festival.
April 19, 2026	Shreveport, Louisiana	9	2	11	2026 Shreveport shooting: Eight children were killed and two women were injured in a domestic-related shooting. One of the victim's sister and her daughter were injured after jumping off a roof. The suspect carjacked a vehicle and fled to Bossier City later that day, where police fatally shot him.
March 1, 2026	Austin, Texas	4	15	19	2026 Austin bar shooting: A man opened fire on West Sixth Street, firing into a bar and at people in the surrounding area, killing three people and injuring 15 others. The shooter was killed by responding police officers.
February 16, 2026	Pawtucket, Rhode Island	4	2	6	2026 Pawtucket shooting: A woman shot five of her family members, killing her ex-wife and their adult son, and leaving three injured, at an ice rink hosting a high school hockey game. The shooter died from a self-inflicted gunshot wound after another person intervened. The ex-wife's father died from his injuries nine days after the shooting.

=== 2025 ===
Date	Location	Dead	Injured	Total	Description
December 13, 2025	Providence, Rhode Island	2	9	11	2025 Brown University shooting: A former student opened fire in Brown University's engineering school during a review session for final exams, killing two people and injuring nine others. The shooter then traveled to Brookline, Massachusetts where he fatally shot Nuno Loureiro in a separate attack, before dying by suicide in Salem, New Hampshire.
November 29, 2025	San Joaquin County, California	4	13	17	2025 Stockton shooting: A shooting during a birthday party being held at a banquet hall near Stockton killed four people, three of whom were children, and injured thirteen others.
October 12, 2025	Beaufort County, South Carolina	4	15	19	2025 Saint Helena Island shooting: Three people were killed and 14 others were injured, four critically, in a shooting at a bar on Saint Helena Island in the early morning hours. A suspect was also killed and another injured.
October 10–11, 2025	Leland, Mississippi	7	12	19	2025 Leland shooting: Following a homecoming high school football game, a shooting during a gathering in downtown Leland killed seven people and injured 12 others. Six others suffered non-gunshot injuries.
October 4, 2025	Montgomery, Alabama	2	12	14	2025 Montgomery shooting: Two people, including a teenager, were killed and 12 others were injured when two groups of people opened fire on each other in a crowd in Downtown Montgomery.
September 28, 2025	Grand Blanc Township, Michigan	3	5	8	2025 Grand Blanc Township church attack: A man rammed a vehicle through the front doors of a meetinghouse of The Church of Jesus Christ of Latter-day Saints south of the city of Grand Blanc. The man then exited the vehicle and opened fire, killing two people and injuring five others before setting the church on fire. Responding officers shot and killed the gunman. In addition to the gunshot casualties, two people died from the fire and a further three suffered from smoke inhalation.
September 27, 2025	Southport, North Carolina	3	6	9	2025 Southport shooting: A man on a boat coming up Cape Fear River opened fire on an outdoor bar on the shore of the Intracoastal Waterway, killing three people and wounding six others. A suspect was apprehended loading their boat at a public boat ramp in Oak Island to the west shortly afterwards.
August 27, 2025	Minneapolis, Minnesota	3	27	30	2025 Annunciation Catholic Church shooting: A person opened fire in the Windom neighborhood through the windows of Church of the Annunciation at the beginning of morning Mass, killing two children sitting in the church pews and injuring 27 others, 24 of whom were children. Another person suffered a non-gunshot injury. The shooter then died by suicide.
August 1, 2025	Anaconda, Montana	4	0	4	2025 Anaconda shooting: A man is suspected of opening fire at a bar next door to where he lived, killing four people, before fleeing and sparking a manhunt.
July 28, 2025	New York City, New York	5	1	6	2025 Midtown Manhattan shooting: A man opened fire inside 345 Park Avenue in Midtown Manhattan, killing a police officer and a woman before "spraying" the lobby of the building with gunfire. He then shot a security officer hiding behind a security desk and another man in the lobby, took an elevator to the 33rd floor of the building, and killed another person before fatally shooting himself. Five people, including the perpetrator were killed, and another man was wounded, while four others were injured while fleeing the attack. Investigators believe the man attempted to target the headquarters of the National Football League but took the wrong elevator.
July 13, 2025	Lexington, Kentucky	3	3	6	2025 Lexington shootings: A man shot a state trooper near Blue Grass Airport during a traffic stop before hijacking a vehicle and driving to a church where he shot four people, killing two women and injuring two men. Responding officers shot and killed the man at the church.
July 2, 2025	Chicago, Illinois	4	14	18	2025 River North shooting: A drive-by shooting occurred outside a restaurant holding a rapper's album release party in the River North neighborhood. Four people were killed and 14 were hospitalized.
June 14, 2025	Champlin, Minnesota & Brooklyn Park, Minnesota	2	2	4	2025 shootings of Minnesota legislators: A suspect believed to be posing as a police officer shot state senator John Hoffman and his wife at their home in Champlin in the early morning hours. Officers then conducted a welfare check on state senator Melissa Hortman at her home in Brooklyn Park because she lived nearby. They found the suspect at Hortman's home; he exchanged gunfire with them before fleeing. Hortman and her husband were both shot and later died from their injuries. The Hortman's dog was also shot and was later euthanized.
April 17, 2025	Tallahassee, Florida	2	6	8	2025 Florida State University shooting: A gunman opened fire at Florida State University, killing two people and injuring five others, before being shot and injured by police. A 20-year-old student was arrested.
February 22, 2025	Shiloh, Pennsylvania	2	6	8	2025 UPMC Memorial Hospital shooting: A man opened fire at the UPMC Memorial Hospital, killing a police officer and injuring six others, before police killed him. One other person was injured while trying to escape the hospital.
January 1, 2025	New Orleans, Louisiana	1	5	6	2025 New Orleans truck attack: After a Texas man, who was inspired by the Islamic State, drove a rented truck through Bourbon Street in the French Quarter neighborhood to kill fourteen people and injure several dozen others with the truck during the New Year's celebrations, he crashed into a crane, exited the vehicle and opened fire, striking five people, including two officers, before he was fatally shot by police.

=== 2024 ===
Date	Location	Dead	Injured	Total	Description
December 16, 2024	Madison, Wisconsin	3	6	9	2024 Abundant Life Christian School shooting: A 15-year-old opened fire with a handgun inside Abundant Life Christian School, killing two people and injuring six others before killing herself.
November 10, 2024	Tuskegee, Alabama	1	12	13	2024 Tuskegee University shooting: During the 100th homecoming week celebration at Tuskegee University, a man opened fire on campus, killing an unaffiliated teen and wounding twelve others, including students. Four others suffered non-gunfire-related injuries.
November 1, 2024	Orlando, Florida	2	7	9	2024 Orlando Halloween shooting: A 17-year-old opened fire on crowds of people celebrating Halloween festivities, killing two people and injuring eight others, including seven by gunshot. One woman was injured after she was trampled by people fleeing the attack.
September 21, 2024	Birmingham, Alabama	4	17	21	2024 Birmingham, Alabama, shooting: Four people were killed and seventeen others were wounded after multiple shooters opened fire outside a bar in the Five Points South neighborhood.
September 7, 2024	Laurel County, Kentucky	1	5	6	2024 Interstate 75 Kentucky shooting: Five people were shot and injured when a lone gunman shot civilians in passing by cars on the Interstate 75 in Kentucky. Three other people suffered injuries due to vehicle accidents caused by the shooting. The shooter’s body was found on September 18, with a self-inflicted gunshot wound to the head.
September 4, 2024	Barrow County, Georgia	4	7	11	2024 Apalachee High School shooting: A 14-year-old student is suspected of opening fire at Apalachee High School, killing four people and injuring seven others, before surrendering to police. Two others sustained non-gunshot injuries.
July 13, 2024	Meridian, Pennsylvania	3	2	5	Attempted assassination of Donald Trump in Pennsylvania: A man opened fire on former President of the United States Donald Trump during a rally from a nearby rooftop, killing an audience member and wounding Trump and two other audience members. The shooter was killed by Secret Service personnel. One of the two wounded audience members died on September 23, 2026.
July 6, 2024	Florence, Kentucky	5	3	8	2024 Florence, Kentucky shooting: 21-year-old Chase Garvey killed four and wounded three others at a residence before fleeing in a vehicle; he crashed into a ditch and committed suicide during a police pursuit.
June 23, 2024	Tampa, Florida	1	3	4	Murder of Julio Foolio: Jacksonville-based rapper Julio Foolio was killed and three others were injured in an 'ambush' shooting at the Holiday Inn parking lot near the University of South Florida campus.
June 21, 2024	Fordyce, Arkansas	4	12	16	2024 Fordyce shooting: A 44-year-old man opened fire at the Mad Butcher Grocery Store, killing four civilians and injuring 11 others, including two police officers. The suspect, identified as Travis Posey from a neighboring county, suffered a graze wound after being shot by police.
June 15, 2024	Rochester Hills, Michigan	1	9	10	2024 Rochester Hills shooting: A 42-year-old man from another county randomly shot nine people including two children at the Brooklands Plaza Splash Pad before driving to his home and shooting himself.
May 30, 2024	Minneapolis, Minnesota	4	3	7	2024 Minneapolis shooting: A man in the Whittier neighborhood killed three people, including a responding officer, and wounded three more before being killed by police.
April 29, 2024	Charlotte, North Carolina	5	4	9	2024 Charlotte shootout: Four law enforcement officers were shot and killed and four others wounded after a suspect fired at a task force serving an arrest warrant for a man. The subject of the warrant, who was later identified as 39-year-old Terry Clark Hughes Jr., was also killed.
February 18, 2024	Burnsville, Minnesota	4	1	5	2024 Burnsville shooting: Police and medics were fired upon from a home while responding to a domestic incident. Two officers and a firefighter were killed while another officer suffered a gunshot wound. After opening fire on first responders, the shooter fatally shot himself.
February 14, 2024	Kansas City, Missouri	1	22	23	2024 Kansas City parade shooting: Gunfire erupted during a parade at Kansas City Union Station to celebrate the Kansas City Chiefs winning Super Bowl LVIII. One person was killed and twenty two others were injured. Three male suspects were detained, two of whom are juveniles and one of whom was shot.
February 7, 2024	East Lansdowne, Pennsylvania	5	2	7	2024 East Lansdowne shooting: A man killed his niece and shot two police officers before setting his house on fire, killing himself and four other relatives. One person was killed by smoke inhalation.
January 21–22, 2024	Preston Heights, Illinois & Joliet, Illinois	9	1	10	2024 Joliet shootings: A gunman opened fire at two homes, killing seven people. The gunman previously opened fire at two locations, killing a man and injuring one person, before fatally shooting himself in a confrontation with law enforcement officials near Natalia, Texas.
January 4, 2024	Perry, Iowa	3 (Note: Including one victim who died 10 days later)	6	9	2024 Perry High School shooting: A 17-year-old male opened fire at Perry High School, killing one student and injuring seven others, including a school administrator, before committing suicide. The principal of the school, who was wounded during the incident, died from his wounds ten days later on January 14.

=== 2023 ===
Date	Location	Dead	Injured	Total	Description
December 6, 2023	Paradise, Nevada	4	3	7	2023 University of Nevada, Las Vegas shooting: A gunman opened fire at the UNLV campus, killing three people and injuring three others before being killed in a shootout with police.
December 5, 2023	Austin, Texas/Bexar County, Texas	6	3	9	2023 Central Texas shootings: A suspect killed four people and injured three others in a shooting in Austin. Another shooting in Bexar County that killed two was also connected to the suspect.
October 29, 2023	Tampa, Florida	2	16	18	2023 Ybor City shooting: Two people were killed and sixteen were injured in a street fight after a Halloween party in the Ybor City neighborhood.
October 25, 2023	Lewiston, Maine	19	13	32	2023 Lewiston shootings: A shooter opened fire at a bowling alley and a local bar, killing 18 people and injuring 13 others. He was found dead from an apparent self-inflicted gunshot wound two days later.
August 23, 2023	Trabuco Canyon, California	4	6	10	2023 Trabuco Canyon shooting: A former police officer shot and wounded his ex-wife before opening fire on random people at the Cook's Corner bar, killing three people and wounding six others. The gunman was killed by police.
July 14, 2023	Fargo, North Dakota	2	3	5	2023 shooting of Fargo police officers: A man shot at police officers responding to an unrelated traffic collision, killing one officer and wounding two more before an officer shot and killed him. In addition, a nearby woman was struck by gunfire.
July 2–3, 2023	Philadelphia, Pennsylvania	5	2	7	2023 Kingsessing shooting: Five people were killed and two others injured in the Kingsessing section of Southwest Philadelphia. A 40-year-old man with an AR-15–style rifle, a handgun, and a scanner was arrested.
July 2, 2023	Baltimore, Maryland	2	28	30	2023 Baltimore shooting: Two people were killed and 28 people were injured in South Baltimore.
June 15, 2023	Monroe Township, Ohio	3	1	4	Doerman family murders: A man shot and killed his three sons and wounded his wife.
June 11, 2023	Annapolis, Maryland	3	3	6	2023 Annapolis shooting: A man fired at neighbors following a dispute over a parking space, killing three people and wounding three others. A suspect was arrested.
June 6, 2023	Richmond, Virginia	2	5	7	2023 Richmond shooting: Seven people were shot, two fatally, outside a downtown theater in Richmond, Virginia, where a high school graduation ceremony had just ended. Two suspects were arrested.
May 15, 2023	Farmington, New Mexico	4	6	10	2023 Farmington, New Mexico shooting: Three civilians were killed and at least six others, including two police officers, were injured after an 18-year-old man opened fire in the city of Farmington, New Mexico. The gunman was killed by police.
May 6, 2023	Allen, Texas	9	7	16	2023 Allen, Texas mall shooting: A man opened fire at the Allen Premium Outlets, killing eight people, and injuring at least seven others before being killed by police.
May 3, 2023	Atlanta, Georgia	1	4	5	2023 Atlanta shooting: A man opened fire inside a Northside Hospital facility in Midtown Atlanta, killing a 39-year-old woman, and injuring four others, before fleeing the scene. After eight hours of being on the run, the suspect was arrested by police without further incident.
May 1, 2023	Okmulgee County, Oklahoma	7	0	7	2023 Henryetta murders: A sex offender killed six people, including four family members, before killing himself at his residence.
April 28, 2023	San Jacinto County, Texas	5	0	5	2023 Cleveland, Texas shooting: A man armed with an AR-15-style rifle opened fire at a home, killing five people, including a child, before fleeing the scene. Three children were covered in blood, but were not injured by gunfire. The suspect, 38-year-old Francisco Oropeza, was captured after a 4-day-long manhunt.
April 17–18, 2023	Bowdoin and Yarmouth, Maine	4	3	7	2023 Bowdoin–Yarmouth shootings: Four people were killed at a home in Bowdoin, followed by a shooting on a highway in Yarmouth that wounded three family members in the same vehicle. The son of two of the victims in Bowdoin was charged with the shooting.
April 15, 2023	Dadeville, Alabama	4	25	29	2023 Dadeville shooting: Gunmen opened fire at a birthday party, killing four people, and injuring 32 others, seven indirectly. Six suspects were taken into custody. One of the deceased was determined to have initiated the gunfire.
April 10, 2023	Louisville, Kentucky	6	8	14	2023 Louisville bank shooting: An employee opened fire at a bank, killing five people and injuring eight others, including a police officer that was critically wounded. The perpetrator, 25-year-old Connor Sturgeon, was fatally shot by police.
March 27, 2023	Nashville, Tennessee	7	1	8	2023 Nashville school shooting: A former student opened fire at The Covenant School in the Green Hills neighborhood. Six people were killed, three of them children, another was injured by gunfire, and one police officer was injured by shattered glass. The perpetrator, 28-year-old Aiden Hale, was fatally shot by police.
February 22, 2023	Pine Hills, Florida	3	2	5	Killing of Dylan Lyons: Three people were killed and two others wounded in a series of shootings. A 19-year-old suspect was arrested.
February 17, 2023	Arkabutla, Mississippi	6	0	6	2023 Arkabutla shootings: The gunman opened fire on a car in a convenience store parking lot, killing a man. He then drove to his ex-wife's house, fatally shooting her and striking her fiancé with a gun. The shooter then drove to his stepfather's house, where he shot and killed his stepfather and his stepfather's sister. Finally, the shooter drove to his own home where he shot and killed two men behind his house before he was arrested nearby after attempting to flee.
February 13, 2023	East Lansing, Michigan	4	5	9	2023 Michigan State University shooting: A mass shooting occurred at Michigan State University in East Lansing. Three people were killed and five others injured. The shooter died of a self-inflicted gunshot wound after being cornered by police.
January 23, 2023	Half Moon Bay, California	7	1	8	2023 Half Moon Bay shootings: A man opened fire at two farms, killing seven people and injuring one other, before being taken into custody.
January 21, 2023	Monterey Park, California	12	9	21	2023 Monterey Park shooting: Eleven people were killed and nine others injured after a gunman opened fire at a dance studio in Monterey Park after a Chinese New Year celebration in the city. The perpetrator shot and killed himself in a standoff with police the next day.
January 16, 2023	Goshen, California	6	0	6	2023 Goshen shooting: A baby, a teenager, and four others were killed in a shooting at a home.
January 4, 2023	Enoch, Utah	8	0	8	Murder of the Haight family: A man shot and killed his wife, mother-in-law, and five children before killing himself.

=== 2022 ===
Date	Location	Dead	Injured	Total	Description
November 22, 2022	Chesapeake, Virginia	7	4	11	2022 Chesapeake shooting: Six people were killed, and four others were injured, when a night-shift manager opened fire at a Walmart. The gunman then committed suicide.
November 19–20, 2022	Colorado Springs, Colorado	5	19	24	2022 Club Q shooting: A gunman killed five after entering a local gay bar and 26 others, including the gunman, were wounded during the attack, 19 of them by gunfire. A suspect was later taken into custody.
November 13, 2022	Charlottesville, Virginia	3	2	5	2022 University of Virginia shooting: A student at the University of Virginia opened fire on a bus returning from a trip to see a play. The three people killed as well as one of the wounded were members of the University of Virginia's football team, and the gunman was a member of the team for one season, though he did not play any games.
October 24, 2022	St. Louis, Missouri	3	4	7	2022 Central Visual and Performing Arts High School shooting: A shooter, a former student, opened fire, killing two people and wounding four others before being shot and killed by police.
October 13, 2022	Raleigh, North Carolina	5	3	8	2022 Raleigh shootings: The shooter, a teenager, went on a shooting spree along the Neuse River Trail greenway and surrounding neighborhood.
October 12, 2022	Bristol, Connecticut	3	2	5	2022 shooting of police officers in Bristol, Connecticut: After an encounter with law enforcement at a bar a man placed a 911 call on his brother. Once police arrived and the man's brother stepped out of their home, the man opened fire from a bush, killing two officers and injuring another and his brother. He then walked over to the officers before the injured officer shot and killed him.
October 9, 2022	Okmulgee, Oklahoma	4	0	4	2022 Okmulgee murders: Four close male friends who were last seen riding their bicycles were fatally shot, dismembered, and thrown in the Deep Fork River.
September 28, 2022	Oakland, California	1	5	6	2022 Oakland school shooting: Four staff members and two students were shot by multiple gunmen at a complex that houses multiple schools. The shooting may have been tied to gang violence.
September 7, 2022	Memphis, Tennessee	3	3	6	2022 Memphis shootings: The perpetrator first shot and killed a man in a driveway. He then shot and killed a man at a gas station, before driving to an intersection where he shot a woman at an intersection. The shooter then started live streaming on Facebook, shooting a man in an Autozone and ending the live steam. He then drove to Poplar Avenue, where he fatally shot one and injured another, before being chased by police and arrested at an intersection.
August 28, 2022	Phoenix, Arizona	3	5	8	2022 Phoenix shooting: A man shot at people in the parking lot of a motel, killing two and injuring five before committing suicide.
August 28, 2022	Bend, Oregon	3	2	5	2022 Bend, Oregon shooting: A local man shot four people, two fatally, in a Safeway supermarket at the Forum shopping center before committing suicide.
July 17, 2022	Greenwood, Indiana	4	2	6	2022 Greenwood Park Mall shooting: A local man fatally shot three people and injured two others at the food court in the Greenwood Park Mall before being shot dead by an armed civilian.
July 4, 2022	Highland Park, Illinois	7	48	55	2022 Highland Park parade shooting: Seven people were killed and 48 others injured after a man fired a rifle from a rooftop at spectators attending Highland Park's Fourth of July parade.
June 30, 2022	Allen, Kentucky	3	4	7	2022 shooting of Kentucky police officers: A man fired out the window of his home, shooting seven people, six of whom were law enforcement officers. Two of the officers died at the scene, and a third died in the hospital the day after. The third officer was a canine handler, and his dog also died. The suspect later killed himself in jail.
June 5, 2022	Chattanooga, Tennessee	2	12	14	2022 Chattanooga shooting: Twelve people were shot, two of them fatally, at a nightclub during the early morning. A third person was killed by a vehicle attempting to flee.
June 4, 2022	Philadelphia, Pennsylvania	3	11	14	2022 Philadelphia shooting: Fourteen people were shot, three of them fatally, by multiple shooters on South Street. One of the shooters may have been shot by a responding police officer.
June 2, 2022	Centerville, Texas/Jourdanton, Texas	6	0	6	Gonzalo Lopez: An escaped prisoner went inside a home and opened fire, killing five members of a family before being shot and killed by police.
June 1, 2022	Tulsa, Oklahoma	5	Unspecified	5+	2022 Tulsa hospital shooting: Four people were killed following a mass shooting at a Saint Francis medical building. The gunman committed suicide.
May 24, 2022	Uvalde, Texas	22	18	40	Uvalde school shooting: 18-year-old Salvador Ramos shot and wounded his grandmother before driving to his former elementary school and opening fire. He killed nineteen children and two adults before being shot dead by police. Eighteen other people were hospitalized.
May 19, 2022	Chicago, Illinois	2	8	10	2022 Near North Side shooting: Two people were fatally shot and eight others were critically injured in a shooting near a McDonald's restaurant in Chicago, Illinois.
May 15, 2022	Laguna Woods, California	1	5	6	2022 Laguna Woods shooting: One person was fatally shot and five others were injured in a shooting at a church in Orange County, California.
May 14, 2022	Buffalo, New York	10	3	13	2022 Buffalo shooting: The shooter, 18-year-old Payton Gendron, a white supremacist who was clad in body armor, opened fire at a Tops supermarket, killing ten people, all of whom were Black, including a security guard, and wounded three others. On February 15, 2023, he was sentenced to life in prison without the possibility of parole. The gunman specifically targeted African-Americans and was influenced by similar terrorist incidents in Charleston, Pittsburgh, Christchurch, Poway and El Paso.
April 12, 2022	New York City, New York	0	10	10	2022 New York City Subway attack: Ten people were shot when a gunman opened fire on a New York City Subway train as it approached the 36th Street station in the Sunset Park neighborhood. Immediately before the attack, the assailant donned a gas mask and threw smoke bombs. The incident caused 19 others to be injured as they fled. The attacker fled the scene and was arrested after police received a tip-off after a 30-hour manhunt. He was identified as 62-year-old Frank James.
April 3, 2022	Sacramento, California	6	12	18	2022 Sacramento shooting: A shooting in downtown Sacramento killed six people and injured twelve others. A suspect was arrested the next day.
February 19, 2022	Portland, Oregon	2	4	6	2022 Normandale Park shooting: During a racial justice protest, a man confronted a group of protestors and engaged in an argument with them, before pulling out a gun and opening fire, killing one and wounding four others. One of the people in the group returned fire and wounded the perpetrator. An injured victim died in 2024.

=== 2021 ===
Date	Location	Dead	Injured	Total	Description
December 27, 2021	Denver/Lakewood, Colorado	6	2	8	2021 Denver and Lakewood shootings: A gunman traveled to multiple businesses and homes, where he killed five people and wounded two others before being shot dead by police.
December 26, 2021	Garland, Texas	3	1	4	2021 Garland shooting: A 14-year-old opened fire inside of a Texaco convenience store, killing 3 and seriously injuring one other.
November 30, 2021	Oxford Township, Michigan	4	7	11	2021 Oxford High School shooting: A student at the school opened fire, killing three and wounding seven students and a teacher before being arrested. One of the injured died afterwards.
September 23, 2021	Collierville, Tennessee	2	13	15	2021 Collierville Kroger shooting: A shooter opened fire in a Kroger, killing one and injuring 14, before taking his own life.
May 30, 2021	Hialeah, Florida	3	20	23	2021 Hialeah shooting: Three shooters stepped out of a SUV, and opened fire at concert goers, killing three and wounding 20 others.
May 26, 2021	San Jose, California	10	0	10	2021 San Jose shooting: Nine people were killed at a Santa Clara Valley Transportation Authority (VTA) rail yard in San Jose, California. After police arrived, the gunman committed suicide.
April 15, 2021	Indianapolis, Indiana	9	4	13	2021 Indianapolis FedEx shooting: Eight people were killed and seven others were wounded after a mass shooting at a FedEx facility. The shooter took his own life.
April 7–8, 2021	Rock Hill, South Carolina	7	0	7	2021 Rock Hill shooting: The perpetrator shot and killed two men installing an HVAC unit on a home, before entering the home and killing four people inside. The shooter commit suicide shortly after midnight the next day following a police standoff.
March 31, 2021	Orange, California	4	2	6	2021 Orange, California office shooting: Four people, including a child, were killed at an Orange office complex.
March 22, 2021	Boulder, Colorado	10	1	11	2021 Boulder shooting: A mass shooting occurred at a King Soopers supermarket in Boulder, Colorado, which left 10 people dead, including an on-duty police officer.
March 16, 2021	Atlanta and Cherokee County, Georgia	8	1	9	2021 Atlanta spa shootings: A series of mass shootings occurred at massage parlors in the Atlanta, Georgia metropolitan area. Eight people were killed in the incidents and one person was wounded.
February 9, 2021	Buffalo, Minnesota	1	4	5	2021 Buffalo, Minnesota, clinic attack: A nurse was killed and four other people were shot and seriously wounded inside of a health care clinic. The suspect, 67-year-old Gregory Paul Ulrich, was taken into police custody.
February 2, 2021	Muskogee, Oklahoma	6	1	7	2021 Muskogee shooting: Five children and one adult were shot and killed, and one other adult suffered life-threatening injuries, after a home shooting in Oklahoma. Suspect, 25-year-old Jarron Pridgeon, is currently in custody.
February 2, 2021	Sunrise, Florida	3	3	6	2021 Sunrise, Florida shootout: Two FBI agents were shot and killed and three others wounded attempting to serve a warrant. The suspect barricaded himself in his home and opened fire before shooting and killing himself.
January 24, 2021	Indianapolis, Indiana	6	1	7	Raymond Childs III: A 17-year-old boy shot and killed his parents, siblings, and the girlfriend of his brother and her unborn child in retaliation for a pending punishment for violating curfew.
January 9, 2021	Chicago and Evanston, Illinois	6	2	8	2021 Chicago–Evanston shootings: 32-year-old Jason Nightengale shot seven people at random, killing five, before being fatally shot by police.

=== 2020 ===
Date	Location	Dead	Injured	Total	Description
December 8, 2020	Williamsburg, West Virginia	6	0	6	2020 Williamsburg massacre: A mother killed her five children with a shotgun before killing herself.
November 20, 2020	Wauwatosa, Wisconsin	0	8	8	2020 Mayfair Mall shooting: Eight people were hospitalized with non-life-threatening injuries after a person opened fire at the Mayfair Mall.
November 6, 2020	Atlanta, Georgia	2	4	6	King Von: After an argument outside a hookah lounge between two groups, multiple people began shooting at each other. Two police officers intervened and engaged the shooters. Rapper Dayvon Bennett (King Von) and another man were killed; four others were wounded. One of the injured was charged with Bennett's murder, but later had his case dismissed.
November 3, 2020	Henderson, Nevada	4	1	5	2020 Henderson shooting: Three people were killed and one person was injured when a gunman opened fire at an apartment complex. The gunman was killed by police.
September 19, 2020	Rochester, New York	2	14	16	2020 Rochester shooting: Two people were killed and fourteen others injured after a shooting at a party in Rochester.
June 4, 2020	Morgan County, Alabama	7	0	7	2020 Valhermoso Springs shooting: Two men affiliated with the gang Seven Deadly Sins fatally shot seven people inside a home and then set it on fire.
March 15, 2020	Springfield, Missouri	5	2	7	2020 Springfield, Missouri shooting: A man committed a series of random drive-by shootings before crashing his vehicle at a gas station. He entered the business, where he killed four people and wounded two others before committing suicide.
February 26, 2020	Milwaukee, Wisconsin	6	0	6	2020 Milwaukee brewery shooting: Five people were killed when a gunman opened fire at the local Molson Coors Beverage Company campus, where he had been employed. Afterwards, the gunman committed suicide.
January 17, 2020	Grantsville, Utah	4	1	5	Haynie family murders: Four members of a family were killed and one was injured after a teenager fired at his family as they returned home.

== See also ==
- List of school shootings in the United States by death toll
- List of school shootings in the United States (before 2000)
- List of school shootings in the United States (2000–present)
- List of unsuccessful attacks related to schools
- Mass shootings in the United States#Deadliest mass shootings since 1949
- List of rampage killers in the United States
- List of countries by firearm-related death rate
- List of countries by intentional homicide rate
- Percent of households with guns by country
- Estimated number of civilian guns per capita by country
- Gun violence in the United States
