= Will Reynolds =

American criminal (ca. 1867–1902)

- Born: William Reynolds c. 1867
- Died: April 6, 1902 (aged c. 35); Tuscumbia, Alabama, United States
- Cause of death: Gunshot wounds
- Motive: Evading arrest

Details
- Date: April 6, 1902 c. 11 a.m.–c. 9 p.m.
- Locations: Tuscumbia, Alabama, United States
- Targets: Colbert County Sheriff's Department; Posse members
- Killed: 7
- Injured: 2
- Weapon: .45-caliber sixteen-shot Winchester rifle

William Reynolds was an African American railroad worker who fatally shot seven people, including a sheriff and three deputies, and injured two others in Tuscumbia, Alabama, United States, on April 6, 1902, following an attempted arrest on a warrant for fraud.

After killing his arresting officer, a prolonged stand-off ensued between Reynolds and law enforcement, who were later assisted by a white civilian posse, engaging Reynolds in several shootouts and attempting to firebomb his location. Over the following hours, three additional police officers and three posse member were killed or fatally wounded while attempting to apprehend or kill Reynolds. Following the arrival of the National Guard, fire was set to the neighborhood in an effort to force Reynolds out, destroying several other houses. Reynolds was killed by the posse while fleeing the scene.

The shooting, known as the Will Reynolds Incident, is considered a precursor to modern mass shootings, along with the 1857 Mountain Meadows Massacre and the 1900 police shootings by Robert Charles, though the 1903 Winfield massacre is generally regarded as the first mass shooting by motivation.

== Background ==
Reynolds was a former resident of Birmingham who lived in Knardtown, a black neighborhood of Tuscumbia. He was married to a local woman, with whom he shared one child, and formerly worked as a brakeman for Southern Railway. Reynolds, aged around 35 at the time of the shooting, was described as "being of light brown complexion [with] a small black mustache" and having a "quiet and peaceable" disposition. He had no previous criminal record.

In 1901, Reynolds became indebted to James E. Isbell over a sum of US$5.75 (equivalent to $214 in 2025) from Isbell's furniture store. A warrant was issued for one count of obtaining goods under false pretenses. He left for Birmingham shortly after, returning to Knardtown after several months in early 1902, a few days before the shooting. Reynolds had reportedly anticipated his arrest, apparently having stockpiled several hundred rounds of ammunition and telling a neighbor that he would never be taken alive. It was later claimed that Reynolds already had a reputation as an accurate marksman with rifles and handguns, capable of shooting a running rabbit with a revolver.

== Shootings ==
=== Arrest attempt ===
On 6 April 1902, Colbert County Sheriff Charles Gassaway was informed of Reynolds' return to his residence. Reynolds had reportedly gone to Isbell's store and engaged in an argument over the debt, due to which Isbell wanted Reynolds to be arrested. At 11 a.m., Gassaway arrived in the settlement with the claimant Isbell at Reynolds' three-room cottage on Cave Street, located three blocks from Tuscumbia's business center. At the front door, Gassaway told Reynolds of the active warrant against him, with Reynolds excusing himself, claiming he wanted to get his hat before he left with them. Reynolds instead grabbed a Winchester or Marlin rifle from another room and shot Gassaway twice in the stomach and arm at a distance of 3 feet (91 cm), mortally wounding him. Isbell fled as Reynolds fired at him, with all gunshots missing. Gassaway was able to crawl away into the yard to take cover behind a wagon. Gassaway returned fire at Reynolds, striking him with a single bullet, which grazed his left cheek and nearly his eye. Reynolds again fired at Gassaway, but missed.

=== Siege ===
Reynolds fled his own residence for the neighboring house of Hilliard James, a local prominent black man, forcing him and his family to leave at gunpoint before barricading himself inside the home. He used various vantage points of the house, such as the windows of three upstairs dormer, facing the south, west, and east, and the cellar to fire at those who came near the house, which was located in a hollow and surrounded by open field. Deputy Will Gassaway, brother of the sheriff, was fatally injured as he was standing behind a tree 300 yards (270 m) from the house. Two other deputies, Pat Prout and James Payne, were struck by a single bullet in the back and chest respectively. Prout was not rescued until an hour after being shot due to fear that Reynolds would open fire. He reportedly only shot at armed men, in one instance shooting a "country boy" in the hat from a distance of 350 yards (320 m) to scare him off.

Several white Tuscumbia townsfolk who had access to guns formed a posse and attempted to subdue Reynolds. No one directly approached the house where Reynolds had hidden himself inside, but posse members threw dynamite in its direction from behind a hay or cotton bale, which had been loaded onto a wheeled cart to act as a barrier, though the explosives did not damage the building, with the strategy abandoned shortly after. From behind the bale cover, kerosene-filled bottles and cotton balls soaked with turpentine were also thrown at the roofs of houses surrounding Reynolds', destroying four of them, but leaving the targeted house undamaged. Over the course of four hours, the posse also spread coal oil in the houses next to Reynolds' location.

Throughout the shootings, several calls were made to the landline of the James residence, usually asking Reynolds to surrender. Reynolds, pretending to be Hilliard James, calmly answered each, including during active shootouts, saying that he believed that his arrest would have resulted in torture by police. The actual Hilliard James was able to re-enter his home two or three times, unsuccessfully trying to convince Reynolds to surrender before Reynolds threatened to kill James if he returned again.

=== Military involvement ===
At 1 p.m., Captain Robert E. Simpson of the Wheeler Rifles, a militia under Company B of the Third Infantry in the Alabama National Guard, arrived from Florence, distributing twelve rifles and 1,000 rounds of ammunition between twelve civilian men. The group surrounded the house and opened fire from all sides, during which Reynolds killed one of the gunmen, Hugh Jones, who was peering from cover behind a corner, and injured two others, Jim Finney, who had taken aim at Reynolds from a vacant building, and Bob Patterson, an onlooker who had left his cover to get a better view of Reynolds.

At 3 or 6 p.m., 42 additional members of the Wheeler Rifles arrived at the order of Governor William D. Jelks. By this point, the group numbered around 1,000 people. It was either the National Guard or three posse members, Jesse Davis, Bob Wallace, and a man named Falkner, who set fire to Reynolds' hideout at 8 or 9 p.m., by dousing the porches on the front and back of the house with kerosene before igniting the liquid with burning cotton. The fire spread despite increasingly rainy weather. Reynolds is thought to have left his original spot and relocated to an outbuilding to escape the flames. The men who laid the fire ran from the property without being injured. Three posse members remained concealed in the bushes, waiting for Reynolds reveal himself. Two of them, Davis and Wallace, left their hiding spots to shoot at the upper story windows of the house from its eastern side before both were shot in the head by Reynolds. Wallace was killed instantly while Davis was mortally injured. The body of Wallace fell into burning debris, but was recovered before it was burned.

=== Reynolds' death ===
Due to the increasing heat, Reynolds fled the burning house, attempting to run towards a nearby shed behind the house. Reynolds was killed by multiple gunshots to the torso fired by Springfield rifles while running from his pursuers. He had thrown up his arms while still holding his rifle. His corpse was shot "hundreds" of additional times and mutilated, with several posse members cutting off various body parts, mostly fingers, as trophies before throwing his remains into the burning James house. As it was uncertain whether Reynolds was truly dead, the body was tied to a dead horse to ensure he could not escape, with burning piles stacked around him. One account claims that Reynolds (named as Will Randle) was still alive and burned to death. In total, 2,000 people from the neighboring towns of Florence and Sheffield were involved in the entire operation, including all available surgeons. Three or four dwelling houses, all belonging to the family of Hilliard James, were destroyed and several horses were killed.

The day after the shooting, Reynolds' body was retrieved and publicly displayed, with onlookers taking items from the burned house and pieces of leftover clothing such as buttons from Reynolds' corpse.

== Victims ==
In the immediate aftermath, three were killed (including Reynolds), three mortally wounded, and four seriously injured. Posse member Jesse Davis died of his wounds two hours after the shooting, followed by Deputy Prout during the night. Sheriff Gassaway died on April 7, followed by his brother Deputy Gassaway in the afternoon. Jim Payne remained in serious condition as of April 10, dying later as the seventh fatality. Despite this, some retrospectives count six dead, not including Reynolds, and three injured.

Nearly all of the casualties were from Tuscumbia, with most of them buried in Oakwood Cemetery, except for Bob Wallace, who was from Riverton, and Hugh Jones and Jim Payne, who were from Sheffield.

Will Reynolds was buried in an unmarked grave in Tuscumbia's black cemetery a day after shooting on April 7. The same day, Pat Prout was buried in the main cemetery, with Bob Wallace being repatriated to Riverton for burial. The funerals of Charles Gassaway and Jesse Davis were held on April 8, followed by Will Gassaway on April 9.

The National Fraternal Order of Police considers six of the dead as members of the Colbert County Sheriff's Department, memoralizing them in annual ceremonies, with the National Law Enforcement Officers Memorial Fund referring to the shooting as the deadliest incident in Alabama law enforcement history; Jesse Davis and Bob Wallace are sometimes listed as deputies, with Wallace being described as having "volunteered his services in the hour of need". Historian Richard Sheridan stated that they were likely not formal law enforcement officers and instead deputized during the stand-off.

=== Killed ===
- Sheriff Charles Gassaway, 33, shot in the abdomen and arm
- Deputy William Gassaway, 37, brother of Charles Gassaway, shot in the abdomen
- Deputy James Payne, shot in the left lung
- Deputy Pat A. Prout, shot in the stomach
- Robert Wallace, shot in the head
- Jesse Davis, 45, shot in the jaw
- Hugh Jones, shot in the head

=== Injured ===
- James Finney, around 15, shot in the right shoulder
- Robert Patterson, shot in the ankle

== Aftermath ==
=== Reactions ===
The shootings were described as unprecedented in Alabama history, though with noted similarities to the shootings in New Orleans two years earlier by Robert Charles, also a black man who killed several police officers in a stand-off. Historian Steven E. Siry characterized both incidents as mass shootings, but noted that unlike the Winfield massacre, which is more widely accepted as the first mass shooting in the United States, the shootings of Charles and Reynolds were the result of confrontations with police, also only targeting law enforcement and those aiding police rather than random members of the public.

Racial tensions were high after the incident. The extrajudicial killing of other black men was subsequently justified as retaliation for Reynolds' actions. A Florence journalist wrote that the killing of Will Reynolds should serve as a reminder for the black community to "avoid conflict with their best friends, the law abiding white man of the South."

The following day, in nearby Florence, Simon Simpson, a black man, was killed after walking inside a butcher shop and "cursing all men who had participated in the killing", telling those present that Reynolds' death should be avenged. When the white butcher, surnamed Walker, ordered Simpson to leave, Simpson struck Walker in the head with a board. In response, Walker slashed the hamstrings in both of Simpson's legs and cut off one of his thumbs before leaving Simpson to bleed to death. Walker turned himself in to police for the killing the same day.

Several African American newspapers praised Reynolds' "wonderful courage, coolness, and bravery", with both mainstream and African American press drawing attention to Reynolds' aim. The Daily Times called for Richmond Planet to be suppressed due to their sympathetic coverage of Reynolds, with editor John Mitchell Jr. writing in response that "black people, men, women, and children [...] have been tortured and brutalized, sometimes while on their hands and knees. They should die fighting rather than trapped and killed". He criticized Reynolds' killing as a lynching, highlighting that he was denied a Christian burial while complimenting Reynolds' resistance during the shootout as "an exhibition of courage which all men, white or black, must admire and commend", further stating "Had Will Reynolds been a white man and his assailants colored ones, we should be equally as forward in doffing our hat to this modern hero". While noting that "We [The Richmond Planet] believe that low degraded elements amongst us should be sent to the rear.", Mitchell ended a brief commemoration of the shooting a month later by quoting the final lines of William Cullen Bryant's Thanatopsis:

Thou go not, like the quarry slave at night,
Scourged to his dungeon, but, sustained and soothed
By an unfaltering trust, approach thy grave,
Like one who wraps the drapery of his couch
About him, and lies down to pleasant dreams.

The Richmond Planet continued to invoke Reynolds in reporting on lynchings as an example of resistance before certain death, arguing, in agreement with an opinion piece by the Evening Leader, that "if [lynch mobs] had reason to believe that the colored man was armed [,] knew how to shoot and, like Will Reynolds, he would shoot, lynchings would be a rare occurence [sic]".

=== Later developments ===
Historian Arthur Graves credits the aftermath of the shooting with improving race relations in Tuscumbia as white and black townsfolk "did everything they could to relieve [racial tensions]".

There was initially conflict over whether the city of Tuscumbia or the county of Colbert was responsible for compensating residents whose houses were destroyed during the incident. On March 4, 1903, the Alabama Legislature reimbursed $1,500 (equivalent to $53,750 in 2025) to Hilliard James and $1,000 (equivalent to $35,833 in 2025) to Henry Spriggs, James' son-in-law, through the Alabama State Treasurer for the destruction of their homes by the National Guard and others. Their homes had been worth between $2,000-2,500, with James having also lost a mare and colt in the fire while Spriggs' two mules were shot and killed by posse members during the shootout.

Will Reynolds' rifle was taken by a posse member from Florence. The rifle was later gifted to Jack Denton, a Sheffield railway worker credited with killing Reynolds. Denton became a police officer in Sheffield and Colbert County, but was dismissed shortly after. After losing his job, Denton killed another black man during a "desperate encounter" in Mobile County. He subsequently became a bootlegger, smuggling whiskey in the Yellow Creek, and was wanted on eight or ten charges for violating revenue law. On October 3, 1905, Denton was caught by Alabama police while on the Tennessee River at Waterloo, being shot and injured by a posse member named McCorke, after Denton attempted to shoot the arresting Sheriff Hill. The group remained on the boat for several days without being able to dock for medical treatment, with Denton dying of his wounds on October 6.

Reynolds is considered a victim of lynching and listed in the Alabama section of the Memorial to the Victims of Lynchings exhibit at America's Black Holocaust Museum.

The house where most of the shootout took place was not rebuilt. As of 2002, Deshler High School stadium was located on the site. The shooting is the topic of "The Will Reynolds Incident - A Shootout in Old Tuscumbia" at the annual Helen Keller Festival in Tuscumbia.

== See also ==
- List of shootings in Alabama
