= List of shootings in Alabama =

Notable shootings in the U.S. state of Alabama include:

| Incident | Location | Date | Deaths | Injured | Total | Description |
|---|---|---|---|---|---|---|
| Tuskegee University shooting | Tuskegee | November 10, 2024 | 1 | 12 | 13 | A teenager not affiliated with the university killed and twelve others injured. Four suffered other injuries. |
| 1902 Tuscumbia shootings | Tuscumbia | April 6, 1902 | 8 | 2 | 10 | Man shot and killed members of police posse before being shot himself. |
| 1994 Popeyes shooting | Gadsden | April 16, 1994 | 3 | | 3 | |
| 2024 Baldwin County shooting | Baldwin County | May 11, 2024 | 3 | 15 | 18 | May Day celebration |
| September 2024 Birmingham shooting | Birmingham | September 21, 2024 | 4 | 17 | 21 | Multiple shooters targeting people outside a lounge bar. |
| 2020 Morgan County massacre | Morgan County | Jun. 4, 2020 | 7 | | 7 | |
| Huntsville birthday party shooting | Huntsville | Jan. 7, 2023 | 2 | 13 | 15 | Birthday party |
| July 2024 North Birmingham nightclub party shooting | Birmingham | July 13, 2024 | 4 | 10 | 14 | Drive-by shooting at a birthday party hosted by a nightclub |
| Geneva County massacre | Geneva | March 10, 2009 | 11 | 6 | 17 | Shooting spree by man targeting family and others |
| 2010 University of Alabama in Huntsville shooting | Huntsville | February 12, 2010 | 3 | 3 | 6 | |
| 2013 Alabama bunker hostage crisis | Midland City | January 29, 2013 | 2 | | 2 | |
| 2016 Citronelle homicides | Citronelle | August 20, 2016 | 6 | | 6 | |
| Killing of Emantic Fitzgerald Bradford Jr. | Hoover | November 22, 2018 | 1 | | 1 | |
| Vestavia Hills church shooting | Vestavia Hills | June 16, 2022 | 3 | | 3 | Gun dealer opened fire at a potluck meeting |
| 2023 Dadeville shooting | Dadeville | April 15, 2023 | 4 | 32 | 36 | Shooting at a 16th birthday party celebration |
| Murders of Harold and Joey Pugh | Cane Creek | July 20, 1997 | 2 | | 2 | Five bank robbers robbing a father-son pair of their truck and shot them to death |
| 1996 Cell phone murders | Huntsville | September 25, 1996 | 4 | 2 | 6 | Three gunmen shooting and killing four out of seven people during a dispute over a stolen cellphone |

== See also ==
- Crime in Alabama
