= List of mass shootings in the Bahamas =

This article is a list of mass shootings in The Bahamas. Mass shootings are firearm-related violence with at least four casualties.

The data includes casualties of perpetrators, including self-inflicted gunshot or shooting of a perpetrator by police. The treatment of perpetrator casualties is at variance to some but not all definitions of a mass shooting used in the United States. The inclusion of injured victims in the data is also at variance with some of the US definitions that only include dead victims. However, the above treatment is consistent with that used in other Wikipedia lists of mass shootings by country.

== 21st century ==
Date	Location	Dead	Injured	Total	Description
10 July 2026	Bain Town, New Providence	2	3	5	Two men are killed and three women wounded in a shooting.
9 August 2025	Nassau, New Providence	2	5	7	Two people were killed and five wounded in a gang-related drive-by shooting.
2 March 2025	Nassau, New Providence	0	4	4	Four people were shot and wounded in a gang-related drive-by shooting.
21 December 2024	Fox Hill, New Providence	2	3	5	Two men are killed and three others wounded including a child.
12 February 2023	Nassau, New Providence	0	4	4	Four people were shot and wounded in a gang-related shooting.
4 June 2021	Nassau, New Providence	1	4	5	One man is killed and four others wounded in a shooting.
17 January 2017	The Grove, New Providence	1	3	4	One man is killed and three others are wounded in a shooting.
27 December 2015	New Providence	1	3	4	One man is killed and three others are wounded following an altercation at a party.
29 July 2015	New Providence	0	4	4	Four people were shot and wounded including two children in a gang-related shooting.
8 May 2015	Nassau, New Providence	1	3	4	One man is killed and three others are wounded following in a drive-by shooting.
16 February 2015	New Providence	2	2	4	Two people were killed and two others wounded in a gang-related shooting.
27 December 2013	Fox Hill, New Providence	4	7	11	Four people were shot and killed in a gang related drive-by shooting at Freedom Park, Fox Hill, Nassau. Seven others are also wounded in the shooting.
16 September 2013	Chippingham, New Providence	0	4	4	Four people were shot wounded following an altercation at a Chippingham club.
22 December 2012	Nassau, New Providence	0	4	4	Four people were shot and wounded in a drive-by shooting following an altercation at a party.
1 April 2012	The Grove (West Bay), New Providence	1	3	4	One person is killed and three others are wounded following an altercation at a West Bay nightclub.

== 20th century ==
Date	Location	Dead	Injured	Total	Description
20 May 1964	Nassau, New Providence	7 (Note: Including the perpetrator or suspect)	6	13	A man with a shotgun killed six people including his wife and wounded six people. After his shooting spree he would turn the shotgun on himself.
