= Sef Gonzales =

Australian murderer

- Born: Joseph Claridades Gonzales; 16 September 1980 (age 46); Baguio, Benguet, Philippines
- Education: Parramatta Marist High School; University of New South Wales (withdrew); Macquarie University (incomplete)
- Occupation: Tertiary student
- Status: Incarcerated
- Motive: Financial; Retaliation against parenting style
- Convictions: Murder x 3; Threatening product contamination
- Penalty: 3 life sentences without parole (murder)

Details
- Victims: Teodoro "Teddy" Gonzales, age 46; Mary Loiva Josephine Claridades Gonzales, age 43; Clodine Gonzales, age 18
- Date: 10 July 2001 c. 4:00 – 7:00 pm (AEST)
- Country: Australia
- State: New South Wales
- Location: North Ryde
- Killed: 3
- Weapons: Baseball bat (alleged); Knife
- Date apprehended: 13 June 2002
- Imprisoned at: Lithgow Correctional Centre

Joseph "Sef" Claridades Gonzales (born 16 September 1980) is a Filipino Australian murderer who was convicted and sentenced to life imprisonment for the July 2001 murders of his father Teodoro "Teddy" Gonzales (46), his mother Mary Loiva Gonzales (43), and his sister Clodine Gonzales (18), in Sydney, New South Wales, Australia. As a result of notoriety surrounding the sale of the house where the crimes occurred, the New South Wales government made it illegal to not disclose information related to the history of a property.

== Background ==
Sef Gonzales was born in 1980 in Baguio, Benguet, Philippines, to Teddy Gonzales, a lawyer, and his wife Loiva Claridades, who had married in 1977. In 1983, Sef's sister Clodine was born. After the 1990 Luzon earthquake destroyed the family's home and business, a newly built 40-room hotel (from the rubble of which Gonzales was rescued by his father), the family emigrated to Australia. The family settled in Sydney, New South Wales, and by the late 1990s, Teddy had requalified as a lawyer, set up a successful law firm specialising in immigration, and purchased a plot of land in North Ryde.

The Gonzales family appeared to be close-knit: the parents, however, were devout Catholics who had high hopes and strict expectations for their children. In particular, they had hoped their son would perform well academically, give up his musical and singing aspirations, and embark on a career in medicine or law. After attending Parramatta Marist High School, Gonzales studied medical science at the University of New South Wales but withdrew after two years. He then enrolled in law at Macquarie University.

Performing poorly in his courses and at risk of expulsion, Gonzales tried to cover up his failure by falsifying his grades. When this was revealed by his sister to their parents, they threatened to withdraw certain privileges such as the use of his prized car, a green Ford Festiva. Gonzales also argued with his mother over a girlfriend of whom she disapproved, and his family threatened to disinherit him. This, along with Gonzales' desire to inherit the family's assets, were later established by police as motives for killing his family.

== The murders ==
On 10 July 2001, at about 4:00 p.m., Gonzales left the family's law firm, where he worked part-time, and headed to the family home. Around 4:30 p.m., armed with a baseball bat from his car and two kitchen knives from a knife block in the kitchen, he entered Clodine's bedroom and assaulted her while she was studying. There he compressed her neck while trying to strangle her, struck her head with the bat at least six times, and then stabbed her multiple times with the smaller of the knives. The cause of Clodine's death was a combination of the compression of her neck, blunt force head injuries, and abdominal stab wounds. Gonzales then waited until Loiva arrived home at about 5:30 p.m. After she entered the house, he attacked her with one of the kitchen knives in the living/dining room, inflicting multiple stab wounds and cuts to her face, neck, chest and abdomen. Her windpipe was then completely transected post-mortem.

At around 6:00 p.m., Gonzales' maternal aunt visited the house. She noted her nephew's and sister's cars in the driveway, but the house was dark and unusually quiet (especially given that the family kept six small dogs inside). Looking into the house, she noticed movement, and left with her son after deciding not to enter via the garage. Teddy then arrived home at about 6:50 p.m. After he entered the house, Gonzales attacked him with one of the kitchen knives and inflicted multiple stab wounds to his neck, chest, back and abdomen. One of the stab wounds penetrated his right lung, another penetrated his heart and another partially severed his spinal cord. Teddy sustained defensive wounds, suggesting that there was a struggle.

After killing his family, Gonzales disposed of the murder weapons and the clothing and the size 7 running shoes he was wearing at the time of the murders. He showered, changed clothes, and spray painted the words "Fuck off Asians" on a wall in the house in an attempt to fool investigating police into believing that his family had been the victims of a hate crime. Gonzales then drove to a friend's house, arriving there about 8:00 p.m. The two then went to the Sydney central business district, where they ate at Planet Hollywood and visited a nearby video game arcade. Later in the evening, after dropping his friend off, Gonzales returned home. He called emergency services at 11:48 p.m. to say he had discovered the bodies. Gonzales had also frantically run to his neighbours' house and told them that his parents had been shot.

== Investigation ==
In the days following the murders, Gonzales appeared on television asking for the "killers" to come forward, saying he wanted justice and offering a reward of A$100,000. A few days after the murder, Gonzales visited the family's accountant, enquiring about his inheritance (estimated at A$1.5 million in Australia and ₱1.3 million in The Philippines). As an apparent victim of crime, he was also eligible for a A$15,000 payout. Gonzales then moved to an apartment in Chatswood and put a deposit on a A$173,000 Lexus, telling the dealership he would be using his inheritance to pay for the vehicle. It was also claimed at trial that he traded in his parents' cars and pawned his mother's jewellery. Gonzales also told relatives that he had a brain tumour and asked his godmother in the Philippines for A$190,000 for the alleged surgery, but she did not give him any money. On 20 July, at the combined family funeral, he gave the eulogy and sang "One Sweet Day", which some attendees found odd.

Based on the initial evidence, NSW Police investigators assumed that the murders were part of a robbery attempt. However, there was no sign of intrusion or a forced entry, and despite some superficial ransacking, nothing of value was missing, including the cash in the victims' possession. Also, given the three-hour duration of the crimes, it was deemed unlikely that thieves would remain in the house for that long. Police also noticed an emotional detachment and many inconsistencies in Gonzales' story, such as claims of performing CPR, and thus began to suspect that he was involved. Gonzales' clothes, for example, were found to have the same paint used to spray the graffiti and a shoe box in his room matched the shoes used in the attack. Based on this, Gonzales' internet records were searched, his phone calls began to be recorded, and he was befriended and surveilled by an undercover policeman.

In December 2001, police were able to disprove Gonzales' first alibi, that he waited in his car in the driveway before driving to another suburb and later meeting his friend on the night of the murders. Gonzales then constructed a second alibi, claiming he had taken a taxi (as his car may have been recognised) and visited a brothel at the time of the murders, but this was discredited by both the supposed taxi driver and a sex worker. Other false trails included the fabrication of an e-mail that implicated a business rival of Teddy in the murders and the staging of an attempted burglary on 30 May. A breakthrough came when Gonzales' fingerprint was matched to a series of product poisoning letters which matched address searches on his personal computer. Other evidence indicated his research into poisons, the ordering of toxic-plant seeds, and recent unexplained poisoning-like illnesses in his family. On 13 June 2002, detectives from Strike Force Tawas arrested Gonzales.

== Legal proceedings ==
Gonzales was charged with three counts of murder and one count of threatening product contamination. He was refused bail and held on remand in Silverwater Correctional Centre. During this time, he was denied access to the family's estate to fund his defence, and sought legal aid for the murder trial which took place during April and May 2004. Prosecuted by Mark Tedeschi, the trial revealed that Gonzales had planned the murders for several months before they took place. Initially he researched the idea of poisoning his family. The court heard of numerous lies told to his friends, family and police regarding his whereabouts at the time of the murders, suggesting that Gonzales was a pathological liar. It was found that he had committed the murders because he was fearful that, because of his poor performance in his university studies, his parents might take his car away from him and might withdraw other privileges which had been granted to him, and that he wished to be the sole beneficiary of his parents' property.

On 20 May 2004, Gonzales was found guilty of all four charges. He was sentenced on 17 September 2004 to three concurrent life sentences without parole for the murders. Justice Bruce James remarked that, "I consider that the murders show features of very great heinousness and that there are no facts mitigating the objective seriousness of the murders and hence the murders fall within the worst category of cases of murder at common law." In June 2007, Gonzales was granted approval to appeal his conviction and his sentence. The Supreme Court determined that statements taken from Gonzales by police on the night of the murders may be inadmissible, as he was not cautioned. On 27 November 2007, the appeal was dismissed as there had been no miscarriage of justice, and his convictions remained.

In March 2021, Gonzales failed in his third attempt to get a special inquiry into his convictions for the murders. Previous applications for a special inquiry into his convictions were dismissed in 2018 and 2019.

In August 2025, Gonzales won the right to appeal due to the investigators' discovery of his post-traumatic stress disorder (PTSD), a disorder which Gonzales himself had previously refused to acknowledge in the original murder trial.

== House sale ==
The North Ryde house, located at 6 Collins Street and built by the Gonzales family in 2000, was put on the market shortly after the murders but due to its notoriety, it remained unsold for three years. Its eventual sale aroused controversy in October 2004 when prospective buyers, a couple from Taiwan, agreed to purchase the property. However, they had not been informed of the events that took place there by the realtors, LJ Hooker, only finding them out from a newspaper.

LJ Hooker initially refused to reverse the sale as they had no legal obligation of disclosure, but eventually refunded the buyers' A$80,000 deposit due to the bad publicity it caused. The company was also fined A$21,000 by the NSW Office of Fair Trading. After this incident, the NSW government made it illegal to "fail to disclose information that could have a substantial impact on the value of a property". In November 2005, the house was sold for A$720,000 (A$80,000 less than the previous price) to a buyer who was informed of its history.

== See also ==
- Bart Whitaker – a man who ordered a hit on his family after faking attending a university
- Lyle and Erik Menendez – American brothers convicted of killing their parents in 1989
- Elizabeth Haysom – a dual Canadian-American woman ordered her boyfriend of killing her parents in 1985
- Richardson family murders – a 12-year old minor ordered her partner of killing her family in 2006
- Jennifer Pan
- Lin family murders (Australia)
- Raymond Childs III
