= 1994 Popeyes shooting =

Robbery and mass shooting in Alabama, US

- Location of the Popeyes restaurant
- Location: 34.009898°N 85.987736°W; Gadsden, Alabama, U.S.
- Date: April 16, 1994 c. 12:00 a.m. (CT)
- Attack type: Mass shooting, armed robbery
- Weapon: .45-caliber M1911 semi-automatic pistol
- Deaths: 3
- Injuries: 1
- Perpetrator: Robert Bryant Melson

The Popeyes shooting occurred On April 16, 1994, when three employees were shot and killed and a fourth employee was seriously injured at a Popeyes restaurant in Gadsden, Alabama. The perpetrator, 22-year-old Robert Bryant Melson (June 5, 1971 – June 8, 2017) and his acomplice, 17-year-old Cuhuatemoc Hinricky Peraita (born May 19, 1976), robbed the restaurant of over $2,100, led the four employees into a freezer, and shot all four of them.

Melson was sentenced to death for the crime and executed in 2017. Peraita received a life sentence, but was later sentenced to death for killing another inmate in prison. Peraita remains on death row.

== Shooting ==
On the night of April 15, 1994, Robert Melson and Cuhuatemoc Peraita entered a Popeyes restaurant in east Gadsden through the back door of the building after 23-year-old employee Darrell K. Collier unlocked it to allow fellow employees Nathaniel Baker and Bryant Archer, both aged 17, to take out the trash. Upon entry, Melson and Peraita ordered Archer, Baker, Collier, and another employee, 18-year-old Tamika Collins, into the restaurant's office and demanded that they empty the safe. They complied, after which Melson ordered the group to get inside the restaurant's freezer. Shortly after locking them in the freezer, Melson unlocked the door and opened fire. Baker, Collier, and Collins all died of their wounds before paramedics arrived. Archer was shot at least four times (in the left arm, shoulder, neck, and jaw), but he survived and was able to crawl to the restaurant's office to call 911. The killings happened shortly after midnight in the early hours of April 16, 1994.

== Investigation and arrests ==
Peraita worked at the restaurant before the murders, and despite both Peraita and Melson wearing bandanas concealing their faces, Archer knew and recognized Peraita due to a "distinctive haircut" he had. Archer identified Peraita as a participant, and police located his address from a paycheck he had failed to retrieve from the restaurant. Hours later, police stopped a car in which Peraita and Melson were riding and arrested them. Archer also positively identified Melson as the shooter.

== Legal proceedings ==
Robert Bryant Melson

Cuhuatemoc Hinricky Peraita

Melson was convicted of his role in the crime; he was sentenced to death on May 17, 1996, and placed on death row under Alabama Department of Corrections ID 0000Z601. Melson had two execution dates set in 2010, both of which were stayed. On April 5, 2017, Melson had an execution date set for June 8, 2017. He received a temporary stay from an appellate court on June 2, but the U.S. Supreme Court vacated the stay on June 6 without comment. At 5:45 p.m. on the night of the execution, the U.S. Supreme Court granted a temporary stay so Justice Clarence Thomas could review Melson's appeals. The stay was later lifted and three days after his birthday, the execution began at 9:55 p.m. Melson was pronounced dead at 10:27 p.m.

Peraita was found guilty by a jury on February 10, 1996, after three hours of deliberations. Peraita was sentenced to life without parole on March 15, 1996.

On December 11, 1999, when he was 23 years old, Peraita participated in the fatal stabbing of fellow inmate Quincy Lewis while serving his life sentence at the Holman Correctional Facility. Witnesses said Peraita held Lewis down while another inmate, Michael Castillo, committed the stabbing. Peraita was given a death sentence for Lewis's murder in on November 1, 2001.

== Aftermath ==
In 2014, Archer, then 38, gave an interview to The Birmingham News in which he expressed his hopes that the murder victims would not be forgotten; he also said he experienced chronic and neuropathic pain and was diagnosed with post-traumatic stress disorder as a result of the crime. He also expressed difficulty finding work, having last held a job in 2006 due to employers' concerns about him being a liability because of his disabilities. In a separate 2014 interview for the Gadsden Messenger, Archer expressed that he had anxiety regarding the prospect of his 17-year-old daughter getting a job at the time due to his experience at 17.

== See also ==
- List of death row inmates in the United States
- List of people executed in Alabama
- List of people executed in the United States in 2017
- List of shootings in Alabama

Executions carried out in Alabama
Preceded by Thomas Douglas Arthur May 26, 2017	Robert Bryant Melson; June 8, 2017	Succeeded by Torrey Twane McNabb October 19, 2017
Executions carried out in the United States
Preceded by Thomas Douglas Arthur – Alabama May 26, 2017	Robert Bryant Melson – Alabama; June 8, 2017	Succeeded by William Charles Morva – Virginia July 6, 2017
