= AR-15–style pistol =

Pistol based on the AR-15 design

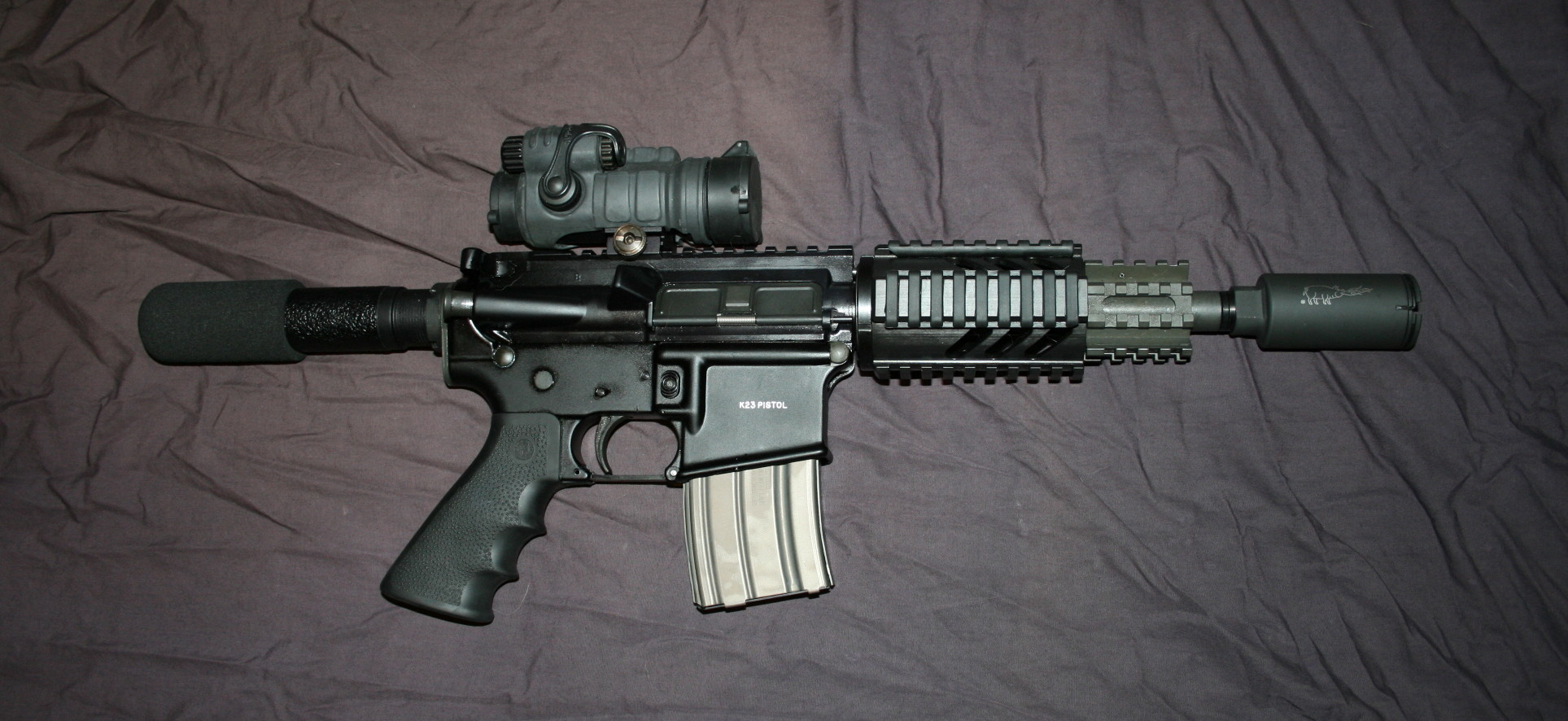
This AR-15 style–pistol has a shorter barrel and has no buttstock.

An AR-15–style pistol is a handgun assembled using an AR-15–style receiver with suitable parts to create a pistol held and fired with one hand. AR pistols were designed in the United States to be a compact, semi-automatic, civilian-legal handgun/personal defense weapon (PDW) with the ergonomics and highly customizable parts of an AR-15 pattern rifle, and a shorter carbine-length barrel. The defining feature of AR pistols is they are not equipped with a buttstock, thereby meeting the legal classification of a pistol, and avoiding classification as a Short-barreled rifle (SBR) under the National Firearms Act (NFA), which are strictly regulated by the Bureau of Alcohol, Tobacco, Firearms, and Explosives (ATF).

== History ==
Colt's Manufacturing Company began marketing the Colt AR-15 self-loading rifle in 1964. These rifles were assembled from interchangeable parts designed to allow replacement of malfunctioning parts without the gunsmith skills and tools required for most firearms. Other manufacturers produced similar parts with features not found on production rifles. Some of these parts can be assembled to create firearms with overall length or barrel-length shorter than rifle dimensions specified by law. These small firearms may be defined as pistols by local laws.

== Design ==
AR pistols were designed to combine the concealability of a handgun with the firepower of a rifle. They are very similar to an AR-15 pattern rifle, with a few key distinctions. They use the standard upper and lower receivers of an AR-15 with a barrel under 16 in (410 mm) in length, the average barrel length of an AR pistol is between 7.5 in (190 mm) and 10.5 in (270 mm). Most importantly AR pistols do not have a buttstock, they are not designed to be fired from the shoulder which is why they are classified as a pistol, and not a rifle. Most AR pistols also have an overall length (OAL) of under 26 in (660 mm), and use a shorter, more compact buffer tube and shorter gas system. AR pistols are commonly chambered in the intermediate cartridges common to the AR platform, including .223 Remington, 5.56x45mm, .300 Blackout, and some are chambered in pistol cartridges like the 9x19mm Parabellum.

=== Stabilizing braces ===
Many AR pistols are also equipped with a stabilizing brace (commonly called a pistol brace), which wrap around, or rest against the forearm and help stabilize the weapon. The pistol brace was originally designed for use by disabled or diminutive shooters. Braces are usually made with a soft, rubber-like material and slide over the buffer tube the way a stock would, they have two rigid wing-type structures that straddle the forearm and are secured to the shooter's arm with a velcro strap. Following the ATF's approval of the brace for use on AR pistols in 2012, determining that the brace's "soft material was not suitable for shouldering and therefore was not considered a stock", SIG Sauer and a few other companies began manufacturing them for general use. Despite their intended use as a brace, their design has evolved to allow them to be shoulder-fired as well.

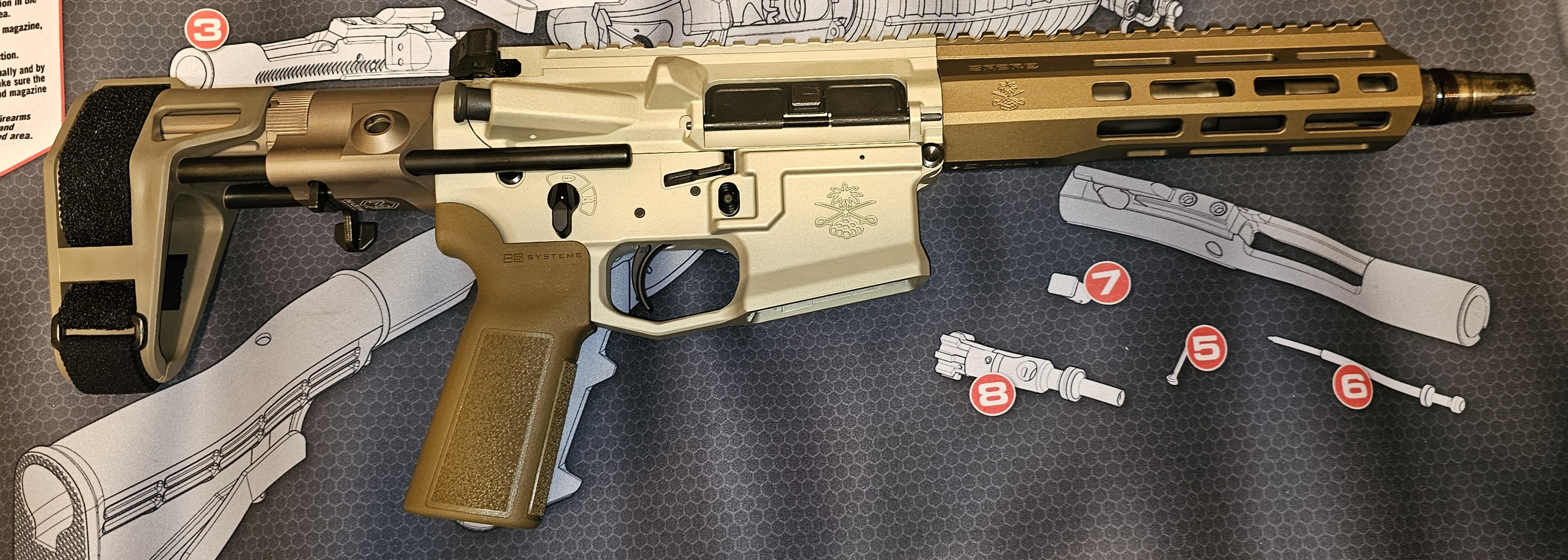
Palmetto State Armory Sabre-15E Mixtape Vol. 1 .300 Blackout AR pistol with Maxim CQB brace, an example of a common type of pistol brace

== Uses ==
As a weapon that is both a rifle and pistol in technical senses, the AR pistol has a variety of uses, advantages, and disadvantages. They make excellent self-defense guns, as they are designed to be used and easily maneuvered in compact, tight spaces, and are easily concealable under clothing or in vehicles for those with concealed carry permits. Their smaller size, and lighter weight make them easier to use for people with injuries or disabilities, and the elderly.

=== Advantages ===
- AR pistols are far less regulated under federal law than similar sized short-barreled rifles.
- In most states AR pistols are regulated as handguns, allowing them to be carried with a handgun carry permit.
- Smaller, lighter, and more maneuverable than a rifle.
- Fires more powerful rifle rounds in a compact design. Despite rifle cartridges having less power when fired out of short barrels, they still surpass common handgun cartridges in terms of velocity and energy.
- Better accuracy than regular handguns at longer ranges.
- Higher magazine capacity than regular handguns.

=== Disadvantages ===
- The AR-15–style receiver is larger and heavier than most handgun actions.
- Many AR-15 cartridges produce lower velocity with distracting muzzle flash and muzzle blast when fired from pistol barrels.
- More legal complications than a regular handgun. While AR pistols aren't regulated under federal law the way SBRs are, their possession is either restricted or banned in a growing number of states that classify them as "assault weapons".
- Their magazine capacity is the same as a smaller handgun in states with capacity limits.

== Legal considerations ==
=== AR pistol vs. short-barreled rifle ===
The difference between an AR pistol and a rifle is largely the lack of a buttstock, meaning the firearm isn't designed to be fired from the shoulder. They are able to exist by following the statutory definitions of rifles and pistols: 18 U.S.C. § 921(a)(7) defines a rifle as "a weapon designed or redesigned, made or remade, and intended to be fired from the shoulder and designed or redesigned and made or remade to use the energy of an explosive to fire only a single projectile through a rifled bore for each single pull of the trigger.", while § 921(a)(30) defines a pistol as "a firearm which has a short stock and is designed to be held and fired by the use of a single hand." Since an AR pistol has a short stock (rear pistol grip and brace) and was designed to be held and fired by a single hand, it meets the definition of a pistol. This is also the reason why it isn't defined as a short-barreled rifle, which is defined by the National Firearms Act at 26 U.S.C. § 5845(a)(3)(4) as "a rifle having one or more barrels less than 16 in (410 mm) in length and any weapon made from a rifle (whether by alteration, modification, or otherwise) if such weapon, as modified, has an overall length of less than 26 in (660 mm)". Since the AR pistol does not have a buttstock and was not designed to be shoulder fired, it usually (see Brace section for more details) avoids classification as a short-barreled rifle.

=== Pistol braces ===
The use of stabilizing braces has been a complicated legal issue, since at various points in time the ATF has said that shoulder firing a braced pistol is legal, at other times they have said it would constitute having an unregistered short-barreled rifle, and at other times they out-right banned unregistered pistol braces. After initially determining that pistol braces were legal in 2012, in 2015 the ATF published a letter pointing out that the legal definition of a rifle is "a weapon designed or redesigned, made or remade, and intended to be fired from the shoulder", indicating that shoulder-firing a braced pistol could be illegal. However, in 2017 the ATF reversed direction when they released another letter that said using a stabilizing brace "in a manner other than what it was designed for does not automatically constitute a weapon redesign or change the weapon's classification to that of a short-barreled rifle".

Then, in 2023, during the Biden administration, the ATF once again changed the rules on pistols braces, although this time, the change was far more substantial. In an open letter dated January 2023, the ATF published Final Rule 2021R‑08F, which amended the definition of rifle to include "any firearm equipped with an accessory or rearward attachment—such as a stabilizing brace—that provides sufficient surface area to allow the weapon to be fired from the shoulder". The rule determined that any pistol with a brace, even if a brace was originally marketed for forearm use, constituted a short-barreled rifle. The ATF gave owners of AR pistols equipped with braces a 120-day grace period to either: remove the brace, replace the barrel with one at least 16 inches long and add a stock to bring the OAL to at least 26 inches; or register them as a short-barreled rifle to bring them into compliance with the rule and waived the $200 SBR manufacturing tax for that period. This also caused AR pistol manufacturers to either stop selling them entirely or remove braces and sell them "bear tubed".

The legality of pistol braces changed once again in 2024 following rulings in a series of lawsuits filed to challenge the ATF's Final Rule on the grounds that they exceeded their statutory authority by changing the definition of a law. The legal definition of a rifle is part of a statute that was passed by an Act of Congress and signed into law by President Lyndon B. Johnson as the Gun Control Act of 1968, as such the lawsuit challenged that the legal definition of a rifle could only be changed by a subsequent Act of Congress to amend the GCA. In June of 2024, in the case Mock v. Garland (2023), a federal judge in the United States District Court for the Northern District of Texas determined that the ATF had indeed exceeded their statutory authority, and issued a nationwide injunction against the rule determining it was "arbitrary and vague". In a separate case in August 2024, the United States Court of Appeals for the Eighth Circuit made a similar ruling, they struck down the ATF's pistol brace rule as exceeding their statutory authority, finding their attempt to change the law to be "arbitrary and capricious".

Following these court rulings, the ATF released another open letter in October 2025 stating that AR pistols with braces would no longer be considered short-barreled rifles, and advised those with pending Form 1 applications to register a braced pistol as an SBR that they could withdraw their applications by November 10, 2025, to prevent the weapons from being registered.

=== Vertical foregrip ===
The legality of forward vertical grips on AR pistols is rather complex, adding the wrong type of grip can potentially change its legal definition and make it regulated as a pistol by the National Firearms Act, unlawful possession of which is a felony. A foregrip is a grip installed on the forward handguard of a firearm, under the barrel, to help stabilize the weapon, and a vertical foregrip is one that extends straight down from the handguard at a 90-degree angle. Under the NFA, at 27 C.F.R. § 479.11(a) a pistol is defined as "A weapon originally designed, made, and intended to fire a projectile (bullet) from one or more barrels when held in one hand, and having (a) a chamber(s) as an integral part(s) of, or permanently aligned with, the bore(s); and (b) a short stock designed to be gripped by one hand and at an angle to and extending below the line of the bore(s).", with pistols falling under the definition in subsection (e) of being an Any Other Weapon (AOW), which is defined as "... any weapon or device capable of being concealed on the person from which a shot can be discharged through the energy of an explosive..."

The ATF determined that, by installing a foregrip on a pistol, it is no longer designed to be fired by the use of a single hand and therefore meets the definition of an AOW under the NFA. Therefore, legally installing a vertical grip on most AR pistols requires registering it with the ATF as an AOW. However, this only applies to AR pistols with an overall length under 26 in (660 mm) (which is most), since they are deemed to be "readily concealable", a vertical grip on an AR pistol over 26 inches in length does not make it an AOW, instead it makes it fit the general definition of a "firearm"; although since the vertical grip changes the weapon to a "firearm" instead of "pistol", it wouldn't be able to be carried as a pistol under a handgun permit in some states.

Angled forward grips can be legally installed on AR pistols without any consequence, so long as the grip is canted at a minimum of 85 degrees.

==== State laws ====
Forward grips on firearms are either banned or restricted in the following states:

- California: Vertical grips are restricted as an "assault weapon" feature and can only be installed on semi-automatic firearms with a fixed magazine and a barrel over 16 in.
- Connecticut: Vertical grips are prohibited as an assault weapon feature.
- Illinois: Vertical grips are restricted as an assault weapon feature and can only be installed on semi-automatic firearms with a fixed magazine.
- Massachusetts: Vertical grips are prohibited as an assault weapon feature.
- New Jersey: Vertical grips are prohibited as an assault weapon feature.
- New York: Vertical grips are restricted as an assault weapon feature and can only be installed on semi-automatic firearms with a fixed magazine.
- Virginia: When Virginia law HB217 takes effect on July 1, 2026, any semi-automatic firearm with a vertical grip will be classified as an "assault firearm" and prohibited from sale or transfer to civilians.
- Washington: Forward grips of any kind, including angled, stops, vertical, or any grip designed for use by the non-firing hand to improve control, are prohibited as an assault weapon feature.

== In popular culture ==
AR-15–style pistols have been publicized by Hollywood films including Clear and Present Danger, Bad Boys, and Spawn. AR pistols have also been featured in the John Wick franchise and used by a number of characters, most notably the SIG Sauer MPX, which has both pistol and rifle configurations. In John Wick: Chapter 3 and John Wick: Chapter 4, Wick uses a heavily customized TTI SIG Sauer MPX Carbine 9x19mm, customized by Taran Tactical Innovations.

== Criminal use ==
AR-15-style pistols have been used in several mass shootings in:

- Dayton, Ohio (August 4, 2019)
- Boulder, Colorado (March 22, 2021)
- Collierville, Tennessee (September 23, 2021)
- Nashville, Tennessee (March 27, 2023)
- East Lansdowne, Pennsylvania (February 7, 2024)
- Manhattan, New York (July 28, 2025)
