= Winfield massacre =

1903 mass shooting in Kansas, U.S.

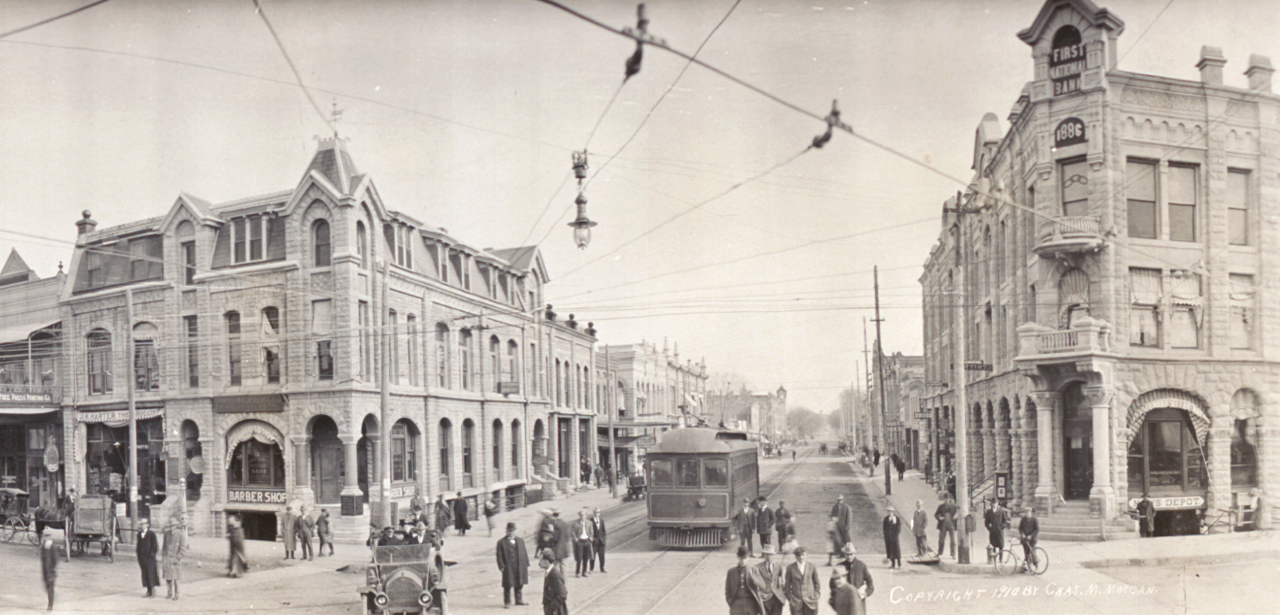
- Corner of Ninth Avenue and Main Street in 1910. Winfield's Odd Fellows building is on the right.
- Location: 37.2403°N 96.9972°W; Winfield, Kansas, U.S.
- Date: August 13, 1903; 123 years ago c. 9:00 p.m. (CT)
- Target: Concertgoers
- Attack type: Mass murder; mass shooting; murder–suicide
- Weapons: 12-gauge Dumoulin & Co. double-barreled shotgun; .32-caliber H&R 6-shot revolver
- Deaths: 10 (including the perpetrator)
- Injuries: 25+
- Perpetrator: Gilbert A. Twigg

On August 13, 1903, a mass shooting occurred at a concert in Winfield, Kansas, United States. Nine people were killed and at least 25 others were injured before the perpetrator, 35-year-old Gilbert Twigg, killed himself.

The indiscriminate attack, uncommon for its time, has been described as "the precursor of modern mass shootings".

== Massacre ==
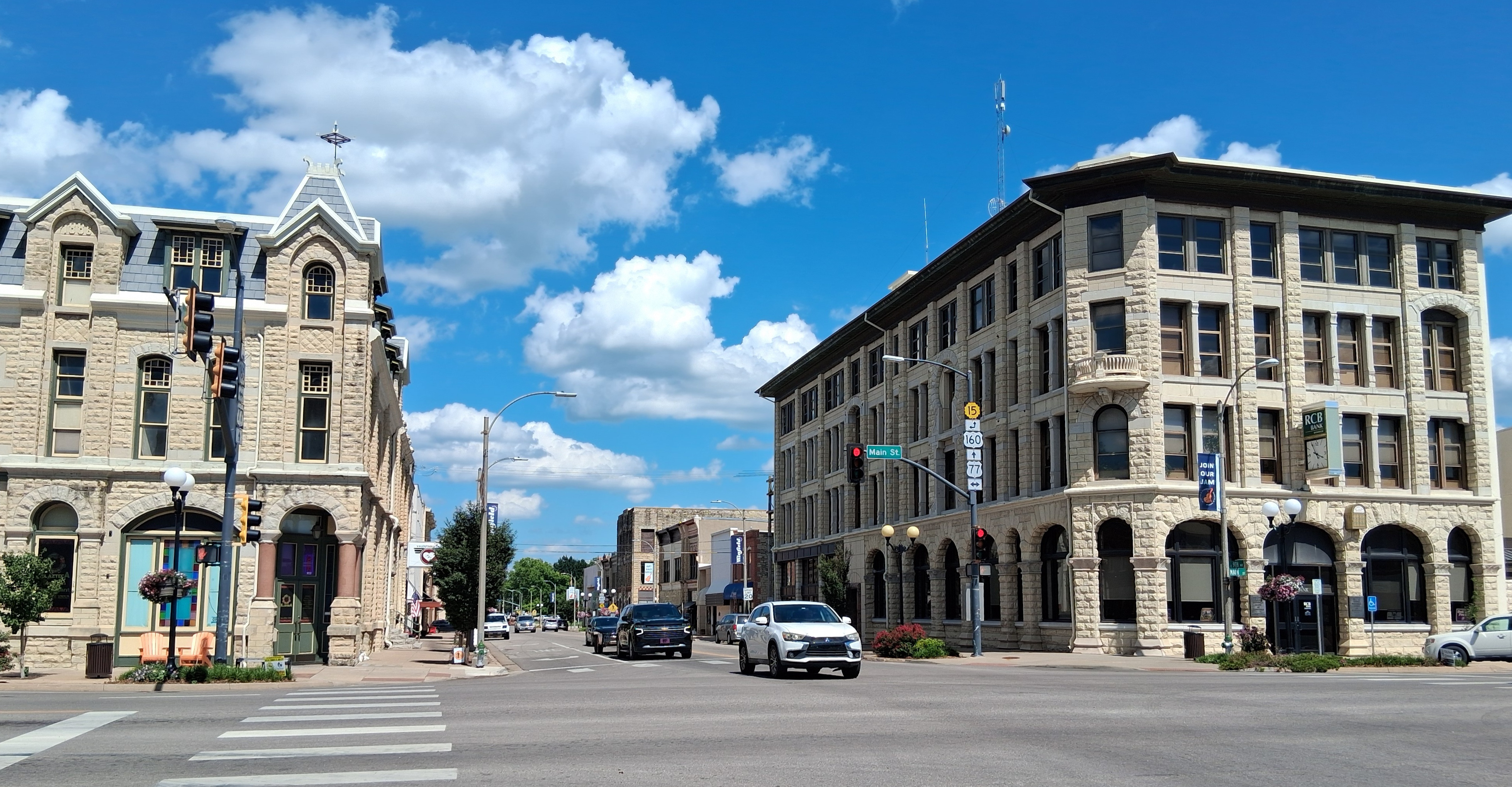
Location of the massacre in 2026

At about 9:00 p.m. on Thursday, August 13, 1903, a concert was being held by W.H. Caman and his military band at the corner of Ninth Avenue and Main Street in Winfield for a crowd of approximately 2,000–5,000 people. Twigg, while hidden in a nearby alley behind the city's Odd Fellows building, fired shots at the audience in rapid succession with a double-barreled shotgun. Six died at the scene or shortly thereafter, and three later died in the hospital. After two men who were attending the concert entered the alley to disarm Twigg, he fatally shot himself with his revolver.

In his boarding room, police found a letter written by Twigg addressed to the public in which he expressed disappointment following a breakup nearly a decade earlier, as well as a desire to "[get] even" with residents of Winfield whom he felt had shunned him and interfered in his personal life. They also found a letter addressed to a friend in Montana and dated September 1, 1902, which ended with: "it would have been much better for me if I had gotten married and settled down as you have done—I have no doubt that you are very happy, while I am not."

== Victims ==
Eight of the nine deceased victims were:

- James Dawson Billiter, 23
- William F. "Bog" Bowman, 55
- Otis Niles Carter, 24
- Roy C. Davis, 15
- Elmer E. Farnsworth, 35
- Sterling Race, 28
- Port B. Smith, 19
- Charles Russell Thomas, 32

== Perpetrator ==
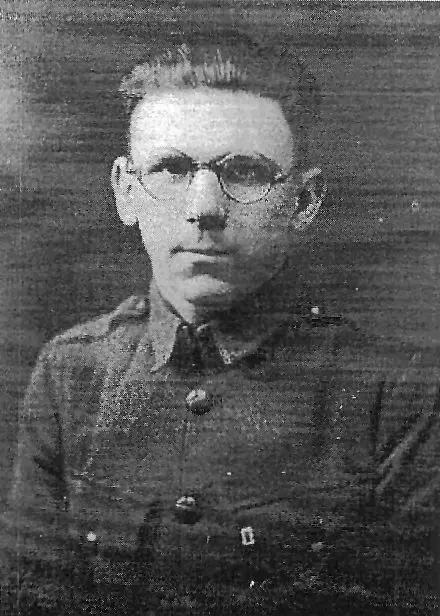
Undated photograph of Twigg

Gilbert A. Twigg was born in Maryland in 1868. He was a miller and an Army veteran who served in the Philippine–American War and the American occupation of Cuba. Prior to his military service, he had lived in Great Falls, Montana, the Territory of New Mexico, and Burden, Kansas.

While in Winfield, he was an employee of Baden Mills and was known locally as "Crazy Twigg", though he was considered harmless, agreeable, and a hard worker.

== See also ==
- List of mass shootings in the United States
