= 2026 Old West End Festival shooting =

Mass shooting in Ohio, US

- Location: 41.6714°N 83.5611°W; Old West End; Toledo, Ohio, US
- Date: June 6, 2026; 5:37 p.m. (UTC−04:00)
- Attack type: Shootout; mass shooting
- Deaths: 0
- Injuries: 12 (including a suspect)
- Accused: Ka’Nye Taylor
- Charges: Attempted murder (20 counts); Felonious assault (21 counts); Aggravated rioting and inducing panic (2 counts)

On June 6, 2026, a shootout that occurred near the Old West End Festival in Toledo, Ohio, United States, injured 12 people, including one of the suspects who may have accidentally shot himself. The shooting allegedly resulted from two rival gang members opening fire at each other, striking bystanders in the process.

== Background ==
The shooting occurred near the Old West End Festival, an annual street festival held in the Old West End neighborhood of Toledo, Ohio.

The Old West End was developed beginning in the late 19th century, with many houses built for the leading businesspeople of Toledo. It is primarily a residential neighborhood, with the notable exception of the Toledo Museum of Art at its southern end. The Old West End contains well-preserved examples of Eastlake, shingle style, and Second Empire style architecture, and has been listed on the National Register of Historic Places since 1973.

The Old West End Festival began in the late 1960s as an informal series of open houses, and expanded into a public event in 1975. The 53rd annual Old West End Festival was scheduled to take place on June 6 and 7. The current iteration of the festival includes a 5K run and the King Wamba Carnival Parade, a revival of a New Orleans Mardi Gras-style parade first held in Toledo in 1909.

== Shooting ==
The shooting happened at roughly 5:37 p.m. local time (21:37 GMT) on June 6, 2026, near the intersection of Delaware Street and Robinwood Avenue in Toledo, Ohio, an area adjacent to the Old West End Festival. According to the Toledo Police Department, two shooters appeared to fire at each other and struck victims who were caught in the crossfire. One of the shooters allegedly shot themselves during the exchange of gunfire.

A teenager, who is not accused of engaging in gunfire, was accused of stealing a bag containing one of the guns used in the shooting from a security checkpoint.

== Victims ==
Police confirmed that 12 people had been shot. Two of the victims were in critical condition, and the other 10 were listed as stable. Their ages ranged from 14 to 61.

== Suspects ==
On June 10, police identified one of the suspects as 20-year-old Ka'Nye Taylor. The following day, police arrested another suspect, 20-year-old Eljay Crisp-Carr, who would eventually have charges dropped against him on October 30 for a lack of evidence indicating he was present at the festival, and cell phone data and an alibi placing him elsewhere at the time of the shooting. On June 16, Taylor was arrested in Columbus at an apartment. Crisp-Carr and Taylor were accused by investigators of belonging to rival gangs, and opening fire at each during festivities, injuring bystanders.

== Legal proceedings ==
On June 24, both suspects were indicted by a Lucas County grand jury. Crisp-Carr was indicted on 25 counts of attempted murder, 26 counts of felonious assault, two counts of aggravated riot, and one count of evidence tampering. Multiple of Crisp-Carr's charges also carried criminal gang activity specifications. Taylor was indicted on 20 counts of attempted murder, 21 counts of felonious assault, and two counts of aggravated riot and inducing panic. 17-year-old Markel Watson also faced charges for allegedly attempting to hide a gun used in the shooting. Authorities want to try Watson as an adult. Watson was later charged with fourth and fifth-degree aggravated riot, third-degree tampering with evidence, fourth-degree inducing panic, and second-degree robbery.

On July 2, Crisp-Carr and Taylor pleaded not guilty, and were held without bail following an order from a municipal judge for Crisp-Carr and a request from the state of Ohio for Taylor. Crisp-Carr and Taylor appeared in court on July 21 for their initial pre-trial hearing. Judge Lori Olender granted a defense motion to allow the men to appear in plain clothes without hand shackles for future court proceedings as long as the men continued to behave appropriately. Crisp-Carr and Taylor had worn dress clothes to the pre-trial hearing. Crisp-Carr and Taylor's attorneys both requested additional time to review evidence and requested bills of particular from the state, with Olender requesting that the state deliver those by July 31. The next hearing was scheduled for August 25.

On October 30, the charges against Crisp-Carr were dropped after it was determined that he was not at the festival. Court records indicated that Crisp-Carr had been misidentified by police, and that his cell phone data and the account of an alibi indicated that he was not at the festival at the time of the shooting. Doorbell camera footage showed Crisp-Carr asking for help with a gas can approximately 20 minutes after the shooting wearing an entirely red outfit, but that the unknown gunman at the festival had worn entirely black clothing.

On November 4, Crisp-Carr and his mother filed a lawsuit against the city of Toledo and Lucas County for wrongful arrest. According to a lawyer representing them, the purpose of the lawsuit was to stop what they allege is a pattern of civil-rights violations by the city of Toledo and the Lucas County Prosecutor’s Office.

== Aftermath ==
On June 16, in response to the mass shooting, the Toledo City Council began discussions over a proposed ordinance to establish "Special Event Safety Zones". The zones would be tailored to specific events and would require supervision over young people during peak event hours, establish civil penalties for parents who failed to monitor their children, and require that all people under the age of 18 attempting to attend an event would need to be accompanied by someone at least 25-years-old at certain times during events. Additionally, no minors could refuse to leave an event zone if they were requested or warned to. On June 23, the city council passed the ordinance, following discussion, decided to implement Special Event Safety Zones for upcoming city-wide Independence Day celebrations.

== Reactions ==
On June 10, state representative Erika White released a statement which said that she was "heartbroken" by the violence and that people deserved spaces where they could be safe from gun violence. The Ottawa Tavern, a local bar in Toledo, hosted a benefits concert for the victims on July 11, with all proceeds from the concert being donated to the victims.

== See also ==
- Crime in Ohio
- Lists of mass shootings in the United States
- 2026 Seattle Center shooting – a shootout at a festival resulting in a mass shooting the following month
