= 2024 East Lansdowne shooting =

Familicide and arson in Pennsylvania, U.S.

- Location: 39.94269°N 75.25954°W; East Lansdowne, Pennsylvania, United States
- Date: February 7, 2024; 2 years ago
- Target: Le family
- Attack type: Mass shooting; arson; murder–suicide; familicide; shootout
- Weapon: Diamondback DB-15 AR-15-style pistol
- Deaths: 6 (5 by gunfire, including the perpetrator, 1 by smoke inhalation)
- Injuries: 2
- Perpetrator: Canh Van Le (Note: Delaware County District Attorney Jack Stollsteimer believes that Le killed his family before the fire was set.)

On February 7, 2024, two police officers were shot while responding to reports about a shooting in a home in East Lansdowne, Pennsylvania, United States. Six more people inside the house, including the 43 year old shooter, were found dead inside shortly after. The gunman reportedly shot five people, all members of the Le family, before committing suicide. A fire engulfed the house during the incident, which investigators believe was intentionally set by the gunman.

== Events ==
At 3:47 p.m., two police officers from East Lansdowne and Lansdowne responded to a call about an 11-year-old girl being shot in a house on Lewis Avenue. According to investigators, the grandfather was the one who called 9-1-1. The grandparents said they saw their son commit the shooting, and they left the house soon after. It was not officially determined who actually made the call, or if the detail was even true.

When the officers arrived, they were immediately fired at by a gunman from inside the house. Both officers were struck once, one in the arm and the other in the leg. Responding police officers from Upper Darby grabbed ballistic shields and dragged both of the wounded officers to safety as the gunman continued firing. Upper Darby Police Superintendent Timothy Bernhardt said that his officers took one of the wounded into a patrol car, while the other was dragged into an ambulance. Both officers were taken to Penn Presbyterian Medical Center in Philadelphia for treatment. Officials said that around 40–50 bullets were fired during the shooting.

Investigations concluded that the shooting started after the perpetrator got into an argument with his niece before entering his bedroom on the second floor and retrieving a Diamondback DB-15 semiautomatic pistol. He then fatally shot his brother, sister-in-law, and two nieces before shooting himself.

Fifteen minutes after officers arrived, a fire started inside the house, and soon burned it down entirely. The flames occurred while the suspect was still firing. The cause of the fire was initially unclear, however investigations later concluded that it was started by the gunman when he committed suicide. Flames were initially seen from the top floor and roof, but then spread to the lower levels and engulfed the house completely, causing it to collapse. The fire continued for hours as fire crews attempted to get it under control. Their response was delayed since they were initially kept away from the scene due to the gunfire. The smoke could reportedly be seen from across the community, and was picked up on StormTracker 6 radar.

== Victims ==
All the deceased victims were part of the Le family, who came from South Vietnam in 1981 after the fall of its government. Three adults and three children were killed in the attack. The children killed were students at the William Penn School District. The youngest victim was in the fourth grade, and the other two were a senior and a middle-schooler.

Both officers were reported to be in stable condition, with non-life-threatening injuries. One of the officers had to undergo surgery in his left arm, and was released from the hospital two days after being shot. The other officer was released from the hospital the day after the shooting.

== Investigation ==
The suspect reportedly got into an argument with his 13-year-old niece before he announced his intent to get a firearm. When investigators initially searched the home, they found a rifle and three bodies, one of which was suspected to be the gunman and the other two were of children. The search resumed the following day, and the remaining three bodies were discovered. The charred bodies, some of which were unrecognizable, were sent to a medical examiner for autopsies, which would identify them and determine the cause of death for each victim. The medical examiner would test to determine whether any of the victims were alive when the fire started.

Officials stated that a torso was found near the rifle, and that the investigation would be closed if it was confirmed to belong to the suspect. Authorities were likely going to have to rely on dental records to identify the dead, according to Delaware County District Attorney Jack Stollsteimer. Investigators believe the fire was started deliberately by the shooter. Heavy machinery was moved into the neighborhood, and the remains of the walls left standing after the fire were torn down by an excavator, which scooped debris to be sifted by investigators.

A woman who claimed to be Chin Le, the mother of the alleged shooter, admitted her son Canh was the perpetrator of the shooting. She said the shooter was in an argument with his 10-year-old nephew before shooting five people and then himself. She also said that she did not know why her son had a gun, and that he had no history of mental illness. She added that the family did not have a long history of arguments. According to The Inquirer, the shooter's father, Huong Le, made the 9-1-1 call before fleeing with his wife to safety as police arrived.

Delaware County investigators later determined that five of the six people killed died from gunshot wounds, while the youngest victim died from smoke inhalation.

== Reactions ==
Hundreds of people gathered at Yeadon Community Park, where they held a balloon release of pink and blue balloons in tribute to the victims, excluding the suspected perpetrator. Hours later, candles were lit on Lewis Avenue outside the family's home.
