= 2023 Dadeville shooting =

Mass shooting in Alabama, U.S.

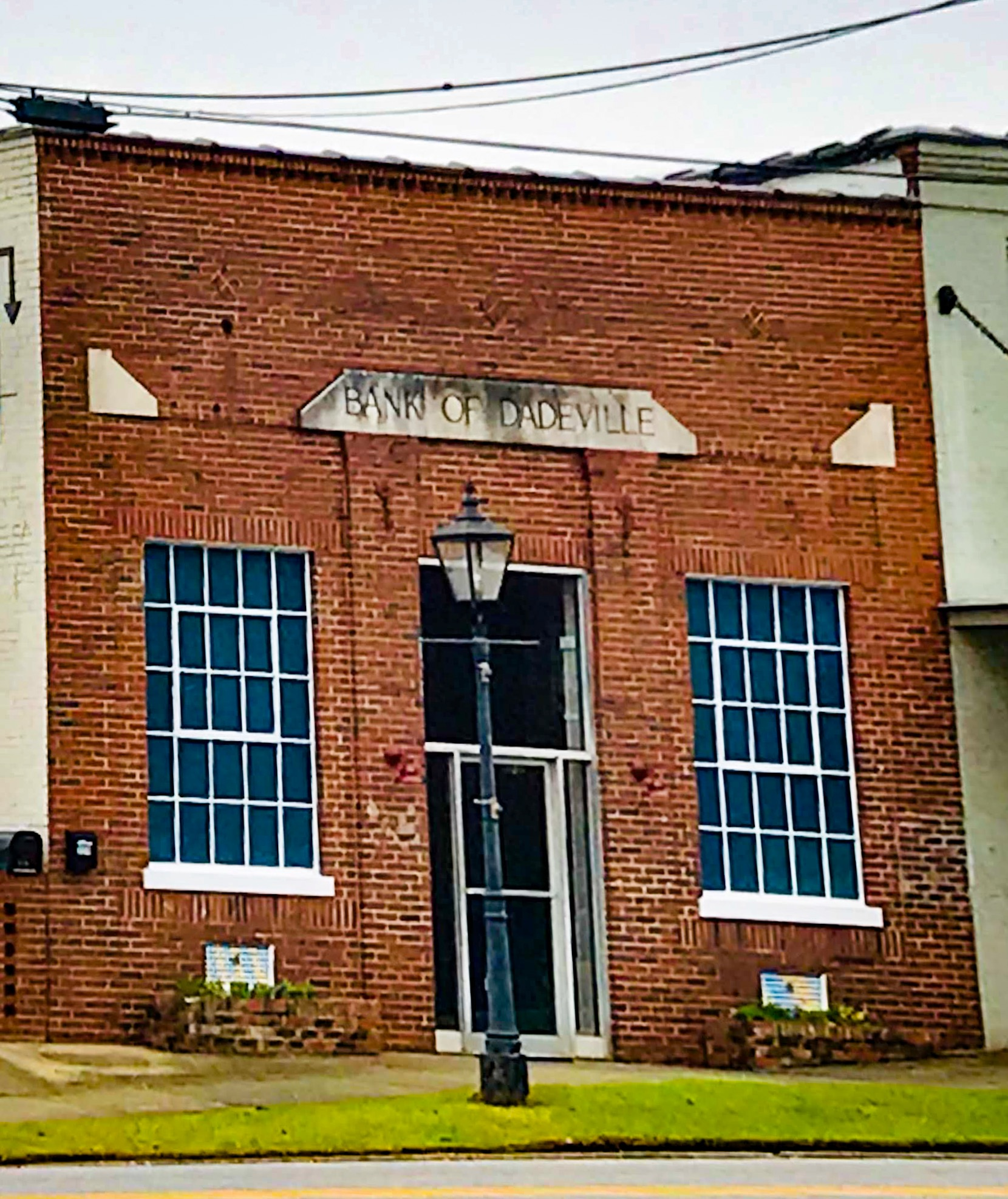
- Site of the shooting, as pictured in 2019 prior to its conversion to Mahogany Masterpiece dance studio
- Location: 32°49′54″N 85°45′48″W; Dadeville, Alabama, U.S.
- Date: April 15, 2023; 10:34 p.m. (CST)
- Attack type: Mass shooting
- Weapon: Handgun(s)
- Deaths: 4 (including one of the perpetrators)
- Injuries: 32 (25 by gunfire)
- Charges: Reckless murder (3 counts each); Assault (24 counts each)
- Verdict: Guilty pleas from five of the perpetrators
- Convicted: Johnny Letron Brown; Willie George Brown Jr; Wilson LaMar Hill; Travis McCullough; Tyreese McCullough; Sherman Peters

On April 15, 2023, a mass shooting occurred in Dadeville, Alabama, United States. The victims were mostly teenagers, with four fatalities and thirty-two injuries. The shooting took place at a 16th birthday celebration at the former Dadeville Bank, at 220 N. Broadnax St, which had been converted into the Mahogany Masterpiece Dance Studio in 2021.

== Shooting ==
The gunfire began on April 15, 2023, at 10:34 p.m. CST. The birthday celebrant recounted that her older brother had found her at the party after hearing that someone there had a gun. The celebrant's mother, after hearing the same rumor, had turned on the lights and demanded anyone with a gun to leave. When no one left she turned the lights back off. An eyewitness stated that shooting began within five minutes of the birthday celebrant's mother telling those with guns to leave the building.

The party DJ said that the celebration stopped when a person carrying a gun was turned away. He said that the shooting broke out about an hour later. According to WRBL, the shooting was thought to be the result of an altercation. Investigators found 89 handgun shell casings but no high-powered rifle ammunition at the scene.

=== Victims ===
Four people were killed and thirty-two people were injured. Those killed were Marsiah Emmanuel Collins, 19; Philstavious Dowdell, 18; Corbin Dahmontrey Holston, 23; and Shaunkivia Nicole Smith, 17. Dowdell was the brother of the birthday celebrant.

== Aftermath ==
Tallapoosa County school district organized for counselors to be on hand for any student who needs help in the aftermath of the shooting. Flags outside Dadeville High School were lowered to half-mast and sporting events were cancelled, and vigils were held on April 16 for the victims.

In light of the attack, President Joe Biden referred to increasing gun violence in the United States as "outrageous and unacceptable", and demanded Congress enact legislation making firearm manufacturers more responsible for gun violence, prohibiting assault weapons and high-capacity ammunition magazines, requiring safe firearm storage, and requiring background checks for the sale of firearms.

Dadeville Mayor Jimmy Frank Goodman Sr, urged for calm in the days after the shooting and that he trusted authorities to track down those responsible. He also stated that the victims were just "schoolkids trying to graduate, trying to make their parents proud. It's devastating."

Jacksonville State University football coach, Rich Rodriguez, released a statement after one of the deceased victims was confirmed to have been a commit to the football team. He offered his thoughts and prayers, and said that he and his staff were heartbroken.

== Investigation ==
The next morning during a news conference, the Alabama Law Enforcement Agency said it had launched an investigation at the request of the Dadeville Police Department. Investigators also asked for any witnesses to come forward during the news conference.

Investigators recovered 89 shell casings from seven different guns at the scene. One of the deceased, Corbin Holston, was found with a gun on his chest. Approximately sixty people were inside of the venue at the time of the shooting.

== Perpetrators ==
On April 18, 2023, two teenage Tuskegee brothers, 17-year-old Tyreese McCullough and 16-year-old Travis McCullough, were arrested and charged with four counts of reckless murder, with more charges expected. They are being charged as adults. A third suspect, 20-year-old Wilson LaMar Hill of Auburn, is facing the same charges. Two more suspects were arrested less than 48 hours later. The fourth suspect, 20-year-old Johnny Letron Brown of Tuskegee, was arrested on April 19, and the fifth suspect, 19-year-old Willie George Brown Jr. of Auburn was arrested on April 20. Both men, who are cousins, faced the same charges. A short time later, a sixth suspect, a 15-year-old from Tuskegee was arrested under the same charges on April 20, but his name and bail conditions were withheld due to his age. The 15-year-old was later identified as Sherman Peters, who is now being tried as an adult. In May 2023, the Browns, Hill and the McCulloughs were indicted on four reckless murder charges, twenty-four first degree assault charges and one third degree assault charge. The first degree assault charges represent victims who had serious gunshot injures, while the third degree assault charge represents a victim who sustained a superficial gunshot wound.

One of the perpetrators, who was not named, was wearing an ankle monitor for a previous shooting.

On March 27, 2026, Willie Brown, Wilson Hill, Peters and the McCullough brothers pleaded guilty to reckless murder and assault charges. As part of the plea deal, they were each sentenced to five years in prison plus an additional fifteen on probation. The sixth perpetrator received youthful offender status. One charge of reckless murder was dropped for the death of Corbin Holston as it is believed that his actions initiated the gunfire.

== See also ==
- List of mass shootings in the United States in 2023
- List of shootings in Alabama
