= 2024 Birmingham, Alabama, shooting =

Mass shooting in Alabama, U.S.

- Location: 33°30′04.8″N 86°47′46.1″W; Hush Lounge; Birmingham, Alabama, U.S.
- Date: September 21, 2024 c. 11:00 p.m. (CDT)
- Attack type: Mass shooting
- Weapon: Glock pistols equipped with Glock switch
- Deaths: 4
- Injuries: 17
- Motive: Under investigation (contract killing suspected)
- Accused: Damien McDaniel; Ny'Quan Lollar; Crishawn Ja'mel McLemore-Bruce
- Charges: Capital murder

On September 21, 2024, four people were killed and seventeen were injured in a mass shooting at an entertainment venue in the Five Points South neighborhood of Birmingham, Alabama, United States.

The police believe that the shooting was targeted, and that the intended target is among the dead.

== Background ==
=== Previous shootings ===
The shooting was the third quadruple homicide in Birmingham in 2024. In February, four men were killed in a drive-by shooting near a car wash. In July, four were killed and ten were injured in a drive-by shooting at a birthday party hosted by a nightclub, which was the city's largest mass shooting in 2024.

=== Five Points South neighborhood ===
Located south of the city's downtown, Five Points South is home to the University of Alabama at Birmingham campus, an area with a mix of restaurants, and a busy nightlife hub, with many pubs and live music spots clustered on 20th Street South.

== Shooting ==
Just after 11 p.m., multiple shooters in a vehicle approached Hush, a hookah and cigar lounge on Magnolia Avenue with a queue outside, exited the vehicle to open fire, and then drove away. Police responded to calls about the shooting, and found two men and a woman unconscious; they were pronounced dead at the scene. A man being treated in the hospital later died. Seventeen others were wounded, with four suffering life-threatening wounds. Around 100 shell casings were recovered from the scene and it is suspected that Glocks equipped with Glock switches may have been used in the attack.

== Victims ==
Three of the four victims were identified as Anitra Holloman, 21; Tahj Booker, 27; and Carlos McCain, 27. The fourth victim who died in the hospital was identified as Roderick Lynn Patterson Jr., 26. Birmingham Police Chief Scott Thurmond said that "some of the victims that were killed had extensive criminal histories", but he also added that he believed many of those shot were "collateral damage". Thurmond did not say which victim or victims may have been targeted, but two of the dead were implicated in previous killings.

== Accused ==
According to law enforcement, the shooting was perpetrated by "multiple shooters" who drove off after the shooting. Investigators believe that they were paid to commit the attack and that one or more people were the intended targets. In October 2024, a suspect, 22-year-old Damien McDaniel, was arrested and charged with capital murder for the shooting. He is also charged with murder and capital murder for two other fatal shootings that occurred on September 19 and 22, respectively. In November 2024, McDaniel was charged with two additional shooting incidents, one of which was another mass shooting at a Birmingham nightclub on July 13 that killed four and injured ten. The other shooting he is charged with was the murder of a man during a burglary on August 13. In February 2025, McDaniel was charged with three more homicides, one of which was a firefighter who died on July 17, 2023, five days after being shot. The other two victims were killed in January 10 and April 9, 2024, respectively. In May 2025, McDaniel was charged with three additional murders, one of them was killed on November 27, 2023 while the other two were killed on Valentines Day 2024. The 2024 Valentines Day case also resulted in the death of an unborn baby. In total, McDaniel has been accused of 18 murders over the span of 14 months. The death toll includes the unborn baby killed during the Valentines Day murders. The crime spree also left 30 others injured.

McDaniel had previously been sentenced to 15 years in prison on two counts of attempted murder after he shot at an occupied car in 2019 when he was 17 years old.

In March 2025, two more suspects, Ny'Quan Lollar and Crishawn Ja'mel McLemore-Bruce, were arrested and charged with capital murder in connection to the shooting.

== Aftermath ==
The owner of the Hush Lounge and another nearby business, Sleek Sports Bar, announced in November 2024 that he would close Hush Lounge on December 1 of that year. The owner of the bar had originally said that he had no intention of closing his business and would remain open and "prayerfully continue to be one of Birmingham’s safest and most enjoyable nightspots". In March 2025, a new owner announced plans to remodel the space into a drag bar and lounge, however in August of that year the owners announced that would be unable to open it after being unable to fund the project. The location was eventually taken over by a new owner, who announced in April 2026 that he would be opening an LGBTQ bar at the location the following month.

== Reactions ==
At a news conference, Randall Woodfin, the mayor of Birmingham, stated that the city was being particularly affected by an epidemic of gun violence in the United States. Mayor Woodfin later called on citizens who had information to come forward about the case saying that if they did not come forward that they "are as responsible for the person or the people that pull the triggers".

The Crime Stoppers of Metro Alabama and Federal Bureau of Investigation (FBI) offered $50,000 USD reward each, totaling $100,000 USD, for helping to find the suspects in the attack, the largest in the former's history, leading to a surge of tips about the case.

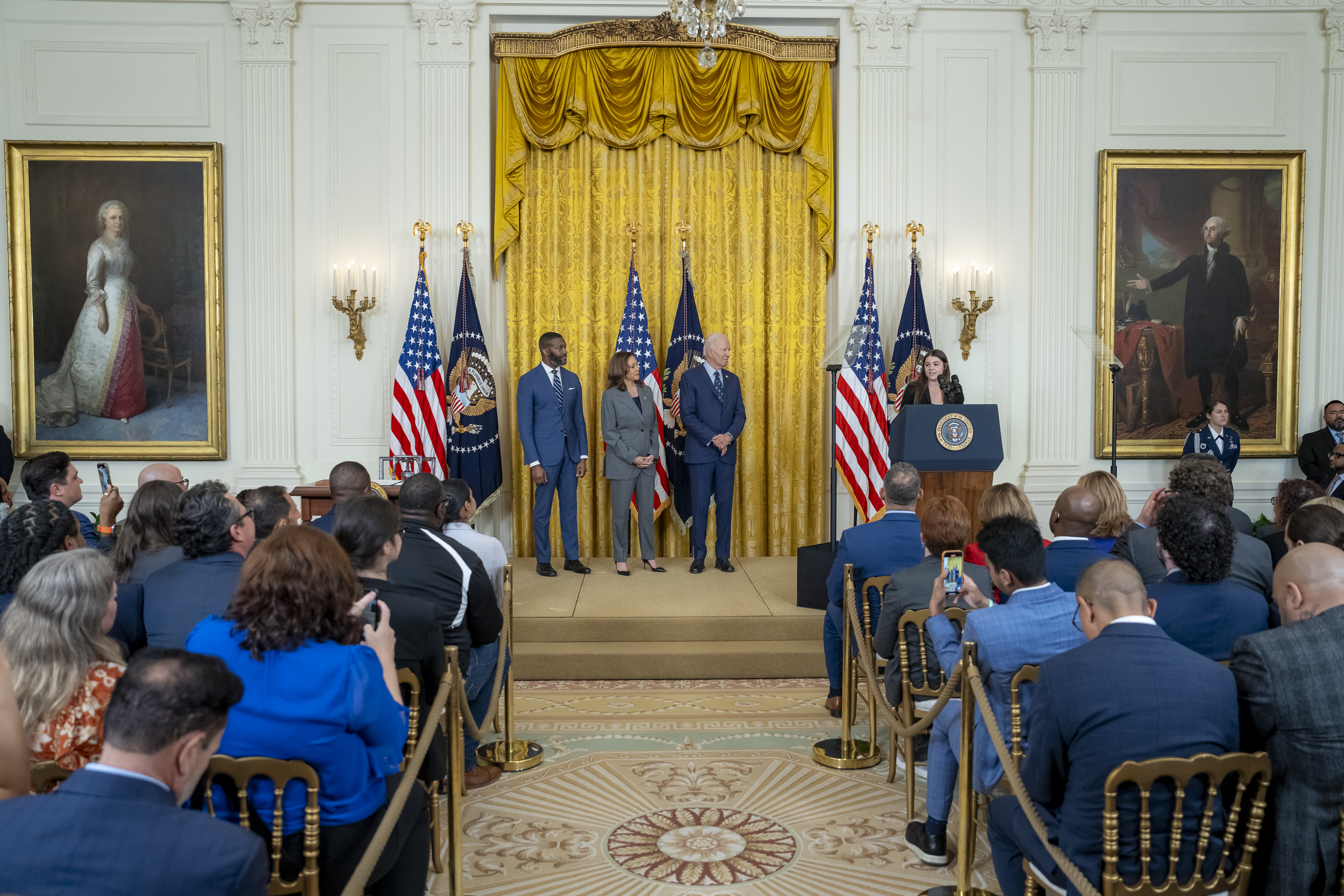
Mayor Randall Woodfin accompanying Vice President Kamala Harris and President Joe Biden at the executive order signing ceremony while Parkland shooting survivor Sari Kaufman speaks on September 26, 2024.

Mayor Woodfin called on the Alabama Legislature to make glock switches, which are illegal under federal law, also illegal under state law. State Representatives Phillip Ensler, Allen Treadaway, Russell Bedsole, Travis Hendrix, and Rex Reynolds prefiled a bill that would make it so that individuals who knowingly have firearms that have a part or parts attached to them that can convert the pistol into a fully automatic weapon that can fire multiple rounds in a short period can be charged with a Class C felony, punishable by up to 10 years in prison. House speaker pro tempore Chris Pringle said that Mayor Woodfin was trying to blame the legislature and that they were "not responsible for most of these issues".

On September 26, Mayor Woodfin and Representative Terri Sewell, who represents the area, visited the White House for an executive order signing ceremony with President Joe Biden and Vice President Kamala Harris. The executive order is designed to target trigger switches by creating a task force which will issue a report in 90 days about the federal government's capacity to detect and seize the devices, as well as an effort to address the trauma caused by active shooter drills in schools. Representative Sewell said of trigger switches that, "Machine gun converters like the one used in Saturday night’s mass shooting are designed for one purpose — mass killing."

On September 27, a vigil was held for shooting victim Anitra Holloman at Railroad Park with her family members and friends in attendance. Multiple community activists spoke at the vigil.

On September 23, Mayor Woodfin posted to his Facebook page a meme of headshots of various state lawmakers representing Jefferson County with the caption, "Thanks to all the Representatives helping to address public safety in Jefferson County". However, red text saying "Not you" was placed over the headshot of State Representative Juandalynn Givan. This meme was posted in response to Givan's suggestion that the Alabama National Guard be called in to support the Birmingham Police Department in response to the violence in the city. Four days later, Woodfin issued an apology for posting the meme and said that he "messed up" following widespread criticism for the post and vowed to shift his focus back to "the real work" of addressing the city's violence problem.

== See also ==
- List of mass shootings in the United States in 2024
- List of shootings in Alabama
