= Raymond Childs III =

American convicted murderer

- Mug shot of Raymond Childs III
- Born: Raymond Ronald Lee Childs III; October 31, 2003 (age 22)
- Parent(s): Raymond Childs Jr (father); Kezzie Childs (step mother)
- Convictions: Murder (6 counts); Attempted murder
- Penalty: 360 years' life sentences without the possibility of parole

Details
- Victims: Raymond Childs Jr; Kezzie Childs; Elijah Childs; Rita Childs; Kiara Hawkins (Infant)
- Date: January 24, 2021
- Country: U.S.
- State: Indiana
- Weapons: 7.62x39mm Mini Draco AK-style pistol; 9mm semi-automatic pistol

Raymond Childs III (born October 30, 2003) is an American convicted mass murderer who was sentenced to 360 years in prison for the 2021 killings of five family members and an unborn child in Indianapolis, Indiana. At the time of the crime, Childs was 17 years old.

Childs III was arrested the following day at a relative's residence and was later indicted in connection with six shootings. His first trial, held in July 2024, ended in a mistrial due to a courtroom disturbance involving a witness. A retrial commenced in October 2024 and concluded after five days with a guilty verdict on all charges.

On March 10, 2025, Childs was sentenced to six consecutive life sentences as well as an attempted murder charge, totaling 360 years, for the murder convictions.

== Early life ==
Raymond Ronald Lee Childs III was born, on October 31, 2003, the second oldest sibling among the four children living in the family home. His parents were Rhonda Smith and Raymond Childs Jr,a music producer and the founder of JusReal Records. At age 12, he moved into the Indianapolis, Indiana home of his biological father, Raymond Childs Jr., and his stepmother, Kezzie Childs. According to court testimony presented by a child developmental psychologist, Dr. James Henry, it was indicated that Childs struggled with feelings of abandonment and rejection after relocation, believing his mother no longer wanted to see him. However, his mother later testified that the father severely restricted her access to Raymond due to a rigid, highly protective parenting style.

His family actively participated in youth-oriented programs such as Nu Street, Nu Path, and Nu Wave Inc., which focused on supporting and mentoring young people through music and related initiatives.

== 2021 mass shooting ==
On January 24, 2021, a mass shooting took place at a residence on East 36th Street in Indianapolis, Indiana, resulting in the deaths of five individuals and an unborn child.

Indianapolis Metropolitan Police Department officers responded to a report of a shooting at 3:43 a.m. and found a 15-year-old male on the porch of a home in the 3500 block of Adams Street suffering from multiple gunshot wounds. Emergency services were called to the home by its residents who had heard gunfire. The teenager was transported to a hospital in critical condition and before being taken in for surgery, he identified his older brother Childs III as the alleged shooter. According to court documents, the teen told investigators his brother shot him and their parents. "He shot them . . . I think they’re dead", he said.

According to reports, the incident was allegedly triggered by a dispute over Childs III violating his curfew. He had taken his father's car without permission on a Saturday night, an action family members stated was not permitted. Upon his return after midnight, his father, Raymond Childs II, reportedly said that consequences would follow.

Following a late-night dispute, Childs III allegedly retrieved two 9-millimeter firearms in the early hours of the morning, and proceeded to shoot members of his family. Prosecutors stated that he moved through the house, shooting victims in separate rooms.

At the time of the incident, Childs III was 17 years old. He was accused of fatally shooting his father, Raymond Childs Jr. (42); his stepmother, Kezzie Childs (42); his siblings, Elijah Childs (18) and Rita Childs (13); his brother's partner, Kiara Hawkins (19); and Hawkins’ unborn child. A 15-year-old sibling survived the shooting with gunshot wounds and contacted authorities.

Childs fled the scene and was arrested the following day at a relative's residence. The firearms used in the shooting were later turned over to police by extended family members. According to Indianapolis Metropolitan Police Chief Randal Taylor, the incident was the city's deadliest mass shooting in over a decade.

== Legal proceedings ==
Childs was charged with six counts of murder, one count of attempted murder, and one count of unlawful possession of a handgun. The first trial took place in July 2024 and resulted in a mistrial because of an outburst in court regarding a witness. This second trial occurred in October 2024 and led to a conviction in five days.

On March 10, 2025, a judge in Marion County sentenced Childs to 360 years in prison. The sentence consisted of consecutive terms for each murder conviction, emphasizing the gravity of the offenses.
