= Lists of mass shootings in the United States =

Deadliest mass shootings in the United States since 1949 (with 10 or more fatalities excluding perpetrators)
Most notable mass shootings in the contiguous United States
Mass shootings in Alaska
Mass shootings in Hawaii
Mass shootings in Puerto Rico
Mass shootings in the United States Virgin Islands
Mass shootings in the Northern Mariana Islands

These are lists of the most notable mass shootings in the United States that have occurred since 1900:

- List of mass shootings in the United States in the 2020s
- List of mass shootings in the United States (2010–2019)
- List of mass shootings in the United States (2000–2009)
- List of mass shootings in the United States (1900–1999)

Mass shootings are incidents involving several victims of firearm-related violence. The precise inclusion criteria are disputed, and there is no broadly accepted definition. Only shootings that have Wikipedia articles of their own are included in this list. Detailed lists of mass shootings can be found per year at their respective pages.

The Gun Violence Archive, a nonprofit research group that tracks shootings and their characteristics in the United States, defines a mass shooting as an incident in which four or more people, excluding the perpetrator(s), are shot in one location at roughly the same time, with the FBI having a minimum of three. The Congressional Research Service narrows that definition further, only considering what it defines as "public mass shootings", and only considering victims as those who are killed, excluding any victims who survive. The Washington Post and Mother Jones use similar definitions, with the latter acknowledging that their definition "is a conservative measure of the problem", as many rampages with fewer fatalities occur. The crowdsourced Mass Shooting Tracker project uses a looser definition than the Gun Violence Archive's definition: four people shot in one incident regardless of the circumstances.

Larger documentation of mass shootings in the United States has occurred through independent and scholarly studies such as the Stanford University Mass Shootings in America Data Project.

== Definitions ==
There are varying definitions of a mass shooting. Listed roughly from broadest to most restrictive:

- Stanford MSA Data Project: three or more persons shot in one incident, excluding the perpetrator(s), at one location, at roughly the same time. Excluded are shootings associated with organized crime, gangs or drug wars.
- Mass Shooting Tracker: 4+ shot in one incident, at one location, at roughly the same time.
- Gun Violence Archive/Vox: 4+ shot in one incident, excluding the perpetrator(s), at one location, at roughly the same time.
- Mother Jones: 3+ shot and killed in one incident, excluding the perpetrator(s), at a public place, excluding gang-related killings.
- The Washington Post: 4+ shot and killed in one incident, excluding the perpetrator(s), at a public place, excluding gang-related killings.
- Congressional Research Service: 4+ shot and killed in one incident, excluding the perpetrator(s), at a public place, excluding gang-related killings, acts carried out that were inspired by criminal profit, and terrorism.

== Summaries ==
Summary list since 2018 which includes all mass shooting events, deaths, injuries, and victims documented across Wikipedia. Sources for these statistics can be found in the corresponding articles.

Year	Events	Dead	Injured	Victims
2025	425	420	1900	2320
2024	586	711	2375	3086
2023	600	739	2440	3179
2022	695	762	2902	3664
2021	690	431	1688	2125
2020	615	521	2541	3062
2019	434	517	1643	2160
2018	323	387	1283	1670

Data compiled from gunviolencearchive.org

Server gunviolencearchive.org provides data about mass shootings from the beginning of 2013, including the date, U.S. city and state, number of killed, number of wounded, perpetrators, and sources on internet. Following are some reports out of this data.

Summary for the years 2013 through 2017 (inclusive) with at least 4 victims per event.

Year	Events	Dead	Injured	Victims
2017	434	600	1994	2594
2016	479	606	1790	2396
2015	371	469	1387	1856
2014	325	364	1213	1577
2013	339	467	1176	1643

Summary for the years 2013 through 2017 (inclusive) with at least 4 people killed per event.

Year	Events	Dead	Injured	Victims
2017	249	600	1113	1713
2016	270	606	851	1457
2015	212	469	622	1091
2014	180	364	512	876
2013	209	467	551	1018

Top 10 U.S. States with most mass shootings each year.

Year	States with most mass shootings
2024 (Jan–Jul)	FL/IL (31), CA (26), TX (22), PA (21), MO (19), MS/AL (18), GA/NC (16)
2023	CA (58), IL (54), FL/PA/NC (36), OH (35), LA (33), GA (30), MS (26), TN (25)
2022	TX (63), IL (61), CA (58), GA/PA (39), NY (36), FL (34), LA (33), MI (29), NC (27)
2021	IL (91), TX (72), CA (54), OH (43), NY (41), PA/LA (39), FL (34), AL (31), MI/GA (28)
2020	IL (77), TX (50), CA (44), FL (41), NY (39), PA (36), LA (33), MO (27), OH (26), MI (25)
2019	CA (54), IL (45), TX (42), LA (28), MD (25), PA (24), OH (21), GA/FL (20), MO (19)
2018	CA (45), IL (41), FL (37), TN (23), TX (21), PA (20), MO (19), NC/NY/AL (17)
2017	CA (49), IL (41), TX (30), FL (29), OH (26), PA (20), LA (19), NY/TN (15), NJ (14),
2016	CA (52), IL (46), TX (44), FL (35), GA (23), AL (22), NY/LA (17), OH (16), TN (15),
2015	FL (30), CA (28), IL (26), NY (22), GA/TX (21), LA (18), OH (16), MD/PA (14)
2014	CA (43), IL (33), FL (22), TX (21), GA (19), MI (15), NY/TN/PA (13), LA (12)
2013	CA (47), FL/IL (21), NC (17), NY (16), MI/TX/PA (15), MO (13), TN/VA/OH (11)

Deadliest months in the U.S. (regarding mass shootings) each year.

Year	Deadliest months
2024 (Jan–Jul)	Jun (80), Jul (70), May (54), Jan (46), Mar (44)
2023	Jul (92), May (88), Jun (80), Apr (75), Oct (70)
2022	Jul (103), Aug (78), Jun (77), Sep (76), May (74)
2021	Jun (98), Jul (95), May (92), Oct (83), Aug (81)
2020	Jun (106), Jul (101), Aug (83), Sep (70), May (70)
2019	Jun (60), Jul (57), Aug (56), May (53), Dec (44)
2018	Jul (60), Jun (59), Sep (41), May (38), Aug (37)
2017	Jul (46), Apr (46), Jun (44), Jan (43), Aug (41)
2016	Jul (59), Jun (53), Aug (51), Nov (43), Sep (42)
2015	Jul (45), Jun (42), Aug (41), May (38), Sep (38)
2014	Aug (50), Jul (34), May (29), Sep (28), Dec (27)
2013	Jun (39), Jul (38), May (34), Sep (33), Aug (32)

Months with most mass shooting events.

Month	Events
July	800
June	763
August	632
May	631
September	521
April	511
October	501
November	425
March	416
January	403
February	373
December	360

Months with most casualties in mass shootings.

Month	Dead
June	826
July	784
May	729
October	690
August	644
January	633
April	606
February	567
November	561
September	537
March	524
December	487

US Mass Shootings, 1982–2024 – Data From Mother Jones’ Investigation

Data from the article from Mother Jones compile data about 150 mass shootings from 1982, 22 of which classifies as a "Sprees". The data reveal, among other things:

- the age of perpetrator(s). The youngest was 11, the oldest 72, the average is 33 years and 8 months.
- the gender of perpetrator(s). Out of 150 events listed, 144 of them are committed by males, 4 by females, 2 by male and female. First shooting perpetrated by a female from the list is from 2006.
- the environment: 35.3% workplace, 15.3% school, 5.3% religious, 4% military, 36.7% other.
- whether the weapon was obtained legally: yes (in 64.7% of all cases); no (10.6%), unknown/to be determined (24.7%)
- the ethnicity of perpetrator(s): white (54% of all cases), black (17.3%), Latino (8%), Asian (6.7%), Native American (2%)

== See also ==
- List of school shootings in the United States by death toll
- List of school shootings in the United States (before 2000)
- List of school shootings in the United States (2000–present)
- List of unsuccessful attacks related to schools
- Mass shootings in the United States § Deadliest mass shootings since 1949
- List of rampage killers in the United States
- List of countries by firearm-related death rate
- List of countries by intentional homicide rate
- Percent of households with guns by country
- Estimated number of civilian guns per capita by country
- Gun violence in the United States
