= 2020 Valhermoso Springs shooting =

Mass shooting in Alabama, US

- Location: 34.50120°N 86.68582°W; Valhermoso Springs, Alabama, US
- Date: June 4, 2020
- Attack type: mass shooting; arson; mass murder
- Weapons: H&K semi-automatic handgun; 9mm Taurus semi-automatic handgun; .40 caliber Taurus semi-automatic handgun; Gasoline
- Deaths: 7
- Perpetrators: John Michael Legg; Frederic Allen Rogers

On June 4, 2020, a mass shooting occurred in Valhermoso Springs, Alabama, United States. Two gunmen, 19-year-old John Michael Legg and 22-year-old Frederic Allen Rogers, fatally shot seven people at a residence before burning the house down. It is one of the deadliest mass shootings in Alabama's history. The police later announced the incident was a targeted attack.

== Shootings ==
On June 4, 2020, 19-year-old John Michael Legg and 22-year-old Frederic Allen Rogers entered the residence on Talucah Road in Valhermoso Springs whilst armed with handguns, and shot all seven victims to death before setting fire to the house. A total of 48 rounds were fired during the shooting. The neighbors called 9-1-1 around 11:20 to 11:35 p.m. to report shots fired in Valhermoso Springs. They stated that they could hear the shooting over the course of about an hour. Upon arrival, the Morgan County Sheriff and Madison County Sheriff Crime Scene Units discovered that four males and three females were killed, all of whom were revealed to have suffered extensive gunshot wounds. The victims were all shot several times, with one being shot a total of sixteen times. A total of 48 spent shell casings were found to have been fired.

The two shooters were tracked to Salem, Oregon, where one of the gunmen had a relative. The Marion County Sheriff’s Department stopped Legg and Rogers in a vehicle and took them into custody to face trial.

== Victims ==
The shooting and subsequent arson killed a total of seven people. Those identified amongst the victims included a 17-year-old girl; Tammy England Muzzey, 45, Emily Brooke Payne, 21, both of Valhermoso Springs; Roger Lee Jones Jr, 19, of Decatur; Jeramy Wade Roberts of Athens, 31; 18-year-old William Zane Hodgin, 17-year-old Dakota Green and James Benford, 22.

The victims were:

- James Wayne Benford, 22, of Decatur
- Tammy England Muzzey, 45
- Dakota Green, 17
- Emily Brooke Payne, 21
- Roger Lee Jones Jr., 19, of Decatur
- William Zane Hodgin, 18, of Somerville
- Jeramy Wade Roberts of Athens, 31

== Aftermath ==
=== Legal proceedings ===
In February 2021, a Morgan County grand jury indicted Rogers and Legg on multiple counts of capital murder. Some of the charges included capital murder for killing two or more persons, as well as murder occurring during the commission of burglary, robbery, and arson. The jury found Rogers guilty of multiple capital murder charges, specifically capital murder of two or more persons, capital murder during burglary, and capital murder during arson. The defense presented testimony during the penalty phase of the trial and also advocating against the death penalty. The jury ultimately recommended the penalty of life imprisonment without the possibility of parole instead of the death penalty, and he was officially sentenced to life without parole in September 2024. Legg pleaded guilty and avoided trial and was similarly sentenced to life in prison without parole.

== Reactions ==
The Sandy Hook Promise issued a statement following the shooting from co-founder Nicole Hockley: “My heart aches for yet another community grieving lives taken too soon by a horrific mass shooting. I hope the investigation leads to the shooter being captured as soon as possible, so that the hard work of healing can begin" in a press release.
