= Gun Violence Archive =

Nonprofit research group

- Abbreviation: GVA
- Formation: 2013; 13 years ago
- Founder: Michael Klein and Mark Bryant
- Type: Nonprofit 501(c)(3)
- Tax ID no.: 46-3582959
- Headquarters: Washington, DC.
- Region served: United States
- Services: Free online database of gun-related violence and crime
- Executive Director: Mark Bryant
- Budget: Assets: $386,925; Revenue: $685,479; Expenses: $818,812 (2022)
- Website: www.gunviolencearchive.org

The Gun Violence Archive (GVA) is an American nonprofit group with an accompanying website and social media delivery platforms which seeks to catalog every incident of what it deems to be gun violence in the United States. It was founded by Michael Klein and Mark Bryant. Klein is the founder of the Sunlight Foundation, and Bryant is a retired systems analyst.

== History ==
The GVA was established in 2013 and began in 2014 and is ongoing. It provides data and statistics related to shootings. Perceived gaps in both CDC and FBI data, as well as their lagging distribution, are some reasons behind why the GVA felt the need to offer independent data collection. The GVA typically publishes incidents in its database within three days whereas the government agencies including the FBI may take months or even years.

The GVA maintains a database of known shootings in the United States, coming from law enforcement, media and government sources in all 50 states.

== See also ==
- Firearm death rates in the United States by state
