= Buffalo shooting =

Buffalo shooting may refer to:

- Assassination of William McKinley, in Buffalo, New York, in 1901
- Buffalo, Minnesota clinic attack, in 2021, that killed one person and wounded 4 others
- 2022 Buffalo shooting, in Buffalo, New York, that killed 10 people (all of whom were black) and wounded 3 others
- Bison hunting, which frequently involved the shooting of bison, also known as buffalo
