= List of mass shootings in the United States in 2021 =

Mass shootings in the United States in 2021
Mass shootings in Alaska in 2021
Mass shootings in Puerto Rico in 2021
Mass shootings in the United States Virgin Islands in 2021

This is a list of mass shootings in the United States that occurred in 2021. Mass shootings are incidents involving several victims of firearm-related violence. The precise inclusion criteria are disputed, and there is no broadly accepted definition.

Gun Violence Archive, a nonprofit research group, run by Tracy Holtan, that tracks shootings and their characteristics in the United States, defines a mass shooting as an incident in which four or more people, excluding the perpetrator(s), are shot in one location at roughly the same time. The Congressional Research Service narrows that definition, limiting it to "public mass shootings", defined by four or more victims killed, excluding any victims who survive. The Washington Post and Mother Jones use similar definitions, with the latter acknowledging that their definition "is a conservative measure of the problem", as many shootings with fewer fatalities occur. The crowdsourced Mass Shooting Tracker project has the most expansive definition of four or more shot in any incident, including the perpetrator in the victim inclusion criteria. A 2019 study of mass shootings published in the journal Injury Epidemiology recommended developing "a standard definition that considers both fatalities and nonfatalities to most appropriately convey the burden of mass shootings on gun violence." The authors of the study further suggested that "the definition of mass shooting should be four or more people, excluding the shooter, who are shot in a single event regardless of the motive, setting or number of deaths."

As of December 2021, 693 (of which 303 resulted in zero deaths) fit the Mass Shooting Tracker project criterion, leaving 703 people dead and 2,842 injured, for a total of 3,545 total victims, some including the shooter(s).

== Definitions ==
- Stanford University MSA Data Project: three or more persons shot in one incident, excluding the perpetrator(s), at one location, at roughly the same time. Excluded are shootings associated with organized crime, gangs or drug wars.
- Mass Shooting Tracker: four or more persons shot in one incident, at one location, at roughly the same time.
- Gun Violence Archive/Vox: four or more shot in one incident, excluding the perpetrators, at one location, at roughly the same time.
- Mother Jones: three or more shot and killed in one incident at a public place, excluding the perpetrators. This list excludes all shootings the organization consider to be "conventionally motivated" such as all gang violence and armed robberies.
- The Washington Post: four or more shot and killed in one incident at a public place, excluding the perpetrators.
- ABC News/FBI: (Note: The FBI does not use the "mass shooting" term but uses a broader term, "mass murder" for four or more victims slain, in one event, in one location, not including the perpetrator.) four or more shot and killed in one incident, excluding the perpetrators, at one location, at roughly the same time.
- Congressional Research Service: four or more shot and killed in one incident, excluding the perpetrators, at a public place, excluding gang-related killings and those done with a profit-motive.

Only incidents considered mass shootings by at least two of the above sources are listed below. Consequently, any shooting incident that satisfies the ABC News/FBI or Gun Violence Archive/Vox definitions will always be accepted, as anything that fits their definitions will be accepted under the Mass Shooting Tracker's definition. Similarly, any shooting incident that satisfies the Congressional Research Service definition will always be accepted, as anything that fits its definition will be accepted under the Mother Jones definition.

== List ==
A number n in brackets indicates that it was the nth mass shooting in that community in the year.

Date	Community	State	Dead	Injured	Total	Description
December 31	Capitol Heights	Maryland	0	4	4	An adult and three juveniles were wounded in an evening shooting.
December 31	Los Angeles (4)	California	0	6	6	Six shoppers were wounded at a grocery supermarket by two male shooters.
December 31	Gulfport	Mississippi	4	3	7	During an outdoor New Year's Eve party, a physical fight started escalated to a shooting, with multiple people firing guns.
December 30	Philadelphia (23)	Pennsylvania	0	6 (Note: Including at least one of the perpetrators)	6	Six shooters opened fire on a busy street with another group returning fire with six wounded including a suspected shooter.
December 30	Kirksville	Missouri	2	2	4	An adult and infant were killed and two adults wounded in an afternoon shooting.
December 27	Mobile (4)	Alabama	1	3	4	A man was killed and three others wounded at a local gas station.
December 27	Denver (2) and Lakewood (2)	Colorado	6 (Note: Including the perpetrator)	2	8	2021 Denver and Lakewood shootings: A gunman went on a shooting spree across multiple locations in the Denver metropolitan area before dying in a shootout with police.
December 27	Youngstown (3)	Ohio	1	3	4	A man was killed and three others were wounded at a local apartment complex.
December 26	Buffalo (3)	New York	0	4	4	Four adults were wounded inside a pop-up store.
December 26	Clear Brook	Virginia	1	4	5	Four people were wounded at a rest stop, and the shooter fled before police arrived. The shooter was later found dead.
December 26	Garland	Texas	3	1	4	2021 Garland shooting: 13-year-old Abel Acosta went inside a convenience store and opened fire. Three teenagers were killed and a fourth person was wounded.
December 26	Fayette	Mississippi	0	7	7	Seven people were wounded at a party in the early morning. An 18-year-old was later arrested.
December 26	Philadelphia (22)	Pennsylvania	0	4	4	Four people were wounded in a drive by shooting in North Philadelphia.
December 25	Lafayette	Louisiana	0	4	4	Four people were wounded near a Waffle House in the early morning.
December 24	New York City (19)	New York	0	4	4	Four men were wounded outside a Brooklyn deli shortly before midnight.
December 24	Roswell	Georgia	1	3	4	A woman was arrested after killing one and wounding three in a domestic incident at an apartment.
December 24	Swissvale	Pennsylvania	0	6	6	Six people were found wounded in a local home, with one identified as the potential shooter.
December 19	Brooklyn	Illinois	1	3	4	One man was killed and three others were wounded in a shooting across the street from a strip club.
December 17	Baltimore (12)	Maryland	1	3	4	One person was killed and three wounded in Upton.
December 17	Portsmouth	Virginia	0	4	4	Four adults were wounded in the early morning at a gentleman's club.
December 17	Baltimore (11)	Maryland	1	4	5	A man was killed and four people wounded in Penn North.
December 16	Troy (2)	Alabama	0	4	4	Four people were wounded in an afternoon shooting.
December 13	Fresno (2)	California	0	4	4	Police were alerted to four wounded by gunfire after an argument escalated through a shotspotter alert.
December 13	Philadelphia (21)	Pennsylvania	0	4	4	Four adults were wounded in Kensington, they were found by patrolling police.
December 13	Durham (4)	North Carolina	2	4	6	Six people in an SUV were shot at in the early morning, causing the SUV to crash. Two adults were killed and four juveniles wounded.
December 12	Bolton	Mississippi	0	6	6	Six people were wounded at local sports bar in the early morning.
December 12	Tampa (3)	Florida	0	5	5	Five people were wounded in the early morning, a suspect was arrested days later.
December 12	Baytown	Texas	1	14	15	One person was killed and fourteen others wounded in a drive-by shooting at a memorial vigil in Baytown for another shooting victim.
December 12	Woodbridge	Virginia	0	4	4	Three security guards and a bystander were shot by a gunman at a nightclub.
December 11	River Grove (2)	Illinois	1	3	4	Four adults were shot at a bowling alley at approximately 1 AM, killing a 23-year-old man.
December 10	Lansing (2)	Michigan	1	3	4	Three teenagers and a baby were shot while in a car near an intersection, killing a 17-year-old girl.
December 10	Orlando (4)	Florida	0	5	5	Five people were shot in a drive-by shooting in the Callahan neighborhood.
December 10	Charlotte	North Carolina	0	5	5	Five people were shot in the Grier Heights neighborhood.
December 9	Beloit	Wisconsin	1	5	6	Responding officers found one person killed and two wounded, with an additional two wounded found at the hospital.
December 8	Milwaukee (6)	Wisconsin	4	0	4	A shooter killed two adults and one juvenile inside a house before killing themselves. The incident was domestic-related.
December 7	Cidra	Puerto Rico	5	1	6	Five men were killed and another injured in a shootout outside a business.
December 6	Philadelphia (20)	Pennsylvania	0	4	4	Three men and a teenager were wounded in Brewerytown.
December 5	Detroit (12)	Michigan	2	2	4	Four men were shot by a gunman, two of whom succumbed to their injuries.
December 5	El Paso (2)	Texas	1	3	4	A fight broke out in the parking lot of a bar, after a group was ejected. It escalated, with bystanders attempting to intervene. A man walked up and shot at the bystanders killing one and wounding three.
December 3	Memphis (7)	Tennessee	2	2	4	Two teenagers were killed and a teenager and an infant were wounded in a drive-by shooting at a gas station.
December 2	Elizabeth City	North Carolina	3	3	6	Responding officers found two adults and a child killed and three adults wounded.
December 1	Kansas City (3)	Missouri	2	2	4	A man shot and injured his girlfriend, then went to an apartment and barricaded himself inside with his two children. The gunman shot both children, one fatally, before killing himself.
November 30	Taylor	Texas	4	0	4	Police responded to a welfare check and found four people dead. A man had shot and killed two family members and a family friend inside his house before dying of a self-inflicted gunshot wound.
November 30	Oxford	Michigan	4	7	11	2021 Oxford High School shooting: A 15-year-old student opened fire at Oxford High School initially killing three students and wounding seven others and a teacher, before being arrested. One of the wounded died a day later. The suspect was charged with four counts of murder and seven counts of attempted murder while his parents, who bought him the gun used in the shooting as an early Christmas present, were charged with four counts of involuntary manslaughter.
November 30	Rex	Georgia	4	2	6	Responding officers to a domestic incident were shot at by the suspect. The suspect had killed two women and wounded a child previously. An officer and the suspect were killed and another officer was wounded.
November 29	Fort Wayne	Indiana	4	0	4	A 20-year-old man shot and killed his mother, father, and 15-year-old sister before killing himself at their home.
November 28	Baltimore (10)	Maryland	0	7	7	Responding police found six adults and a teenager wounded in East Baltimore.
November 28	Evanston (2)	Illinois	1	4	5	A teenager was killed and four others wounded at a gas station.
November 28	Lancaster	California	5	0	5	A man killed his four children and his mother in law in their home. He turned himself in to police an hour later and was charged with five counts of murder. The shooter was given life without parole in 2024.
November 28	Aurora (4)	Colorado	0	5	5	Five youths were wounded in a shooting.
November 28	Philadelphia (19)	Pennsylvania	0	4	4	Four people were wounded in an evening shooting in Kingsessing.
November 27	Newark (2)	New Jersey	1	3	4	A teenager was killed and three others were wounded after men in a car opened fire in the South Ward.
November 26	Nashville (6)	Tennessee	3	4	7	Home invaders killed two teenagers and wounded their mother, two teenage siblings and an adult sibling. One of the assailants was also killed.
November 25	San Antonio (6)	Texas	2	2	4	Two men were killed and two others wounded in a believed targeted drive-by shooting. Eyewitnesses are not cooperating with police.
November 25	Green Sea	South Carolina	0	4	4	Four people were wounded and transported to the hospital in private vehicles.
November 23	Lehigh Acres	Florida	0	4	4	Four people were wounded after a large party was ending. Police believe it connected to another incident near a local hospital.
November 23	Marshall (2)	Texas	1	3	4	A man was killed and three others wounded shortly before noon. A suspect was arrested.
November 22	Warsaw	North Carolina	2	2	4	Two men were killed and two juveniles were wounded while in a vehicle outside an apartment complex.
November 21	Baton Rouge (4)	Louisiana	1	4	5	A man was killed and four others were wounded in the parking lots of a local club.
November 21	Passaic	New Jersey	0	5	5	Four adults and one child were shot during a backyard party.
November 20	Fresno (1)	California	2	2	4	Two men were killed and two wounded at an apartment complex.
November 20	Berwyn	Illinois	0	4	4	Four people were wounded at a local bar in the early morning.
November 18	Smithsburg	Maryland	4	0	4	A current Baltimore police sergeant helped a former officer kidnap the officer's two children from a Pennsylvania home on November 15. Three days later, as police approached them, the former officer shot and killed his two children and the sergeant before killing himself.
November 18	Cambridge	Maryland	1	3	4	One teen was killed, and three other teens were wounded in two separate but related shootings on the same block.
November 17	East St. Louis (2)	Illinois	1	3	4	A man was killed and three others wounded in an afternoon shooting.
November 17	New York City (18)	New York	0	4	4	Two adults and two teens were wounded in a potentially targeted drive-by in Williamsbridge.
November 17	Newburgh	New York	0	4	4	Four teens were shot during a gunfight near a high school.
November 17	Chicago (61)	Illinois	0	4	4	Four people were wounded in a drive-by shooting shortly after midnight on the Near West Side.
November 15	New York City (17)	New York	0	4	4	Four men were shot outside of a bodega in Harlem.
November 15	Aurora (3)	Colorado	0	6	6	Six teenagers were wounded in a drive-by shooting at a park located across from a high school.
November 14	Philadelphia (18)	Pennsylvania	0	6	6	Three men and three women were shot, one man critically.
November 14	Columbia	Missouri	1	5	6	Two men opened fire at each other at a lounge, wounding five. One of the shooters was killed by responding police.
November 14	Chiloquin	Oregon	2	2	4	Four people were shot, two of the victims fatally. A man from Klamath Falls was arrested and charged with murder.
November 14	Tucson (2)	Arizona	4	1	5	Four men arrived at a trailer park and confronted a homeowner and a guest, leading to the homeowner shooting and killing the four men and the guest being injured by the four attackers.
November 14	Troy (1)	Alabama	1	5	6	A man was killed and five others wounded at a gas station in the early morning.
November 13	Winston-Salem (2)	North Carolina	0	4	4	Four people were wounded after several people opened fire at a party.
November 13	Houma (2)	Louisiana	0	4	4	Four people were wounded at a high school homecoming after-party, after multiple attendees began shooting.
November 12	Richmond (4)	Virginia	2	2	4	Two children were killed and two adults wounded on the East End.
November 12	Birmingham (4)	Alabama	2	2	4	Two wounded were found outside a vehicle, where two were found deceased in the backseat. Several weapons were found in the vehicle.
November 9	Rochester (4)	New York	0	4	4	Four teenagers were wounded in an evening shooting.
November 9	Scotland	South Dakota	3	2	5	Three adults were killed and an adult and child were wounded after an argument escalated inside a home.
November 9	Killona	Louisiana	1	4	5	A man was killed and three adults and a teenager wounded in an ambush-style shooting outside a grocery store.
November 8	Philadelphia (17)	Pennsylvania	0	4	4	Three teenagers and an adult were wounded after three of them exited a local store in Feltonville and were chased down the street.
November 7	Loíza	Puerto Rico	3	6	9	One or more individuals began shooting at a business, killing three people and injuring another six.
November 7	Kenosha (3)	Wisconsin	1	3	4	A man was killed and three others wounded in the early morning.
November 6	Oakley	California	2	2	4	Two people were killed and two wounded at a family birthday party.
November 6	Marshall (1)	Texas	0	6	6	Six people were wounded in the early morning at a large community event.
November 6	Highland	California	0	4	4	Shortly after midnight a man opened fire at a local bar, wounding four.
November 5	Oakland (9)	California	1	3	4	A man was killed and three wounded in a drive-by shooting in East Oakland.
November 3	Des Moines	Iowa	0	4	4	Four people were wounded in an evening shooting a block away from a middle school.
November 3	Norfolk (4)	Virginia	3	2	5	A man killed three women and wounded two in a targeted domestic dispute. One of the wounded was targeted and the others attempted to help her. The shooter was given four life sentences in 2024.
November 2	Mobile (3)	Alabama	0	4	4	A woman shot and wounded four in a bowling alley after a fight escalated.
November 1	Orlando (3)	Florida	0	4	4	After an online dispute, a person shot four people in Downtown Orlando.
November 1	San Antonio (5)	Texas	0	4	4	Four people were wounded in an evening drive-by on the West Side.
October 31	Flossmoor	Illinois	1	3	4	Four people were shot just after midnight on Halloween.
October 31	Lakewood (1)	Colorado	2	2	4	Four people were shot, two fatally.
October 31	Houston (18)	Texas	1	9	10	A woman was shot and killed and nine injured at a large Halloween party of hundred people.
October 31	Louisville (2)	Kentucky	2	2	4	Two cousins working as security were shot and killed. Two others were wounded.
October 31	Fort Worth (4)	Texas	1	3	4	An 18-year-old was arrested after killing a man and wounding three others in a drive-by shooting.
October 31	Joliet	Illinois	2	12	14	Two people were killed and several wounded after two men opened fire on a Halloween party.
October 30	Gilroy	California	1	3	4	One person was killed and three wounded after a shooting at a house party. The party occurred at the home of a Gilroy councilwoman.
October 30	Texarkana	Texas	1	9	10	A man was killed and several people wounded after a shooting at a Halloween party.
October 30	Oklahoma City	Oklahoma	0	4	4	Four people were wounded in a residential area in the early morning.
October 30	Decatur	Illinois	0	4	4	Four people were wounded at a large house party in the early morning.
October 30	St. Petersburg (2)	Florida	1	4	5	A man was killed and four others wounded at an outdoor boxing match at the Skyway Plaza.
October 30	Sacramento (2)	California	2	5	7	Two people were killed and five injured at a Halloween party that was held at a local banquet hall.
October 29	Kalamazoo	Michigan	0	4	4	Four people were shot at a party inside an event center.
October 29	Poughkeepsie	New York	0	5	5	Three people were wounded at a birthday party and two more were wounded as the tour bus transporting some of the wounded was later shot at.
October 28	Sunrise Manor	Nevada	0	4	4	Four people were wounded after an argument in an alley escalated.
October 28	Nashville (5)	Tennessee	1	3	4	A man was killed and three wounded in a suspected robbery shortly before midnight.
October 25	Boise	Idaho	3	4	7	Two people, including a security guard, were shot and killed at a mall, and four others were wounded. The shooter was injured by responding officers and died the next day after being taken into custody.
October 25	Memphis (6)	Tennessee	0	4	4	Three teenagers and an adult were wounded after a shooting near an elementary school.
October 24	Naranjito	Puerto Rico	3	3	6	Multiple gunmen opened fire at a restaurant, killing a criminal who is believed to have been their target. Five bystanders were shot, two fatally.
October 24	Gonzales	California	2	2	4	Two people were killed and two others injured at an off-roading event.
October 24	Crenshaw	Mississippi	2	3	5	Two people were killed and three injured in a shooting on Jones Street.
October 23	Florence	South Carolina	0	6	6	Six people were wounded in an early morning shooting at a local bar.
October 23	Ontario	California	1	4	5	A teenager was killed and one adult and three juveniles wounded at a Halloween party.
October 23	Fort Valley	Georgia	1	7	8	A man was killed and seven others wounded at an off-campus party about two blocks from Fort Valley State University.
October 22	Chicago (60)	Illinois	0	5	5	Five people were wounded outside a Chatham liqueur store when a man opened fire and then fled.
October 22	Renton	Washington	0	4	4	Four people were wounded in the parking lot of a banquet hall that was hosting a Halloween party.
October 22	Baltimore (9)	Maryland	0	7	7	Five adults and two teenagers were wounded in a drive-by shooting.
October 21	Tacoma (2)	Washington	4	0	4	Three adults were killed and a fourth later died at the hospital in a night time shooting.
October 21	New York City (16)	New York	0	4	4	A gunman exited a subway station and shot four people in the Flatbush section of Brooklyn.
October 20	Farwell	Michigan	4	0	4	A woman shot and killed her father, sister and two workers at their home in the afternoon. The shooter was given life without parole in 2022.
October 19	Kenosha (2)	Wisconsin	3	2	5	A man killed his roommate's teenage daughter and her boyfriend, and wounded his roommate and her 14-year-old son. He later killed himself.
October 17	Houston (17)	Texas	0	5	5	Responding officers found an SUV in a ditch with bullet holes and blood near Winzer Park. Four adults and a juvenile were later identified at local hospitals although none had reached out to police.
October 17	St. Louis (6)	Missouri	1	3	4	A 19-year-old was killed and three teenagers were wounded in the early morning in the Baden neighborhood.
October 17	Pine Bluff (2)	Arkansas	1	3	4	Responding officers found four people wounded and shell casings around a car in the intersection.
October 17	Colorado Springs (3)	Colorado	0	5	5	Five people were wounded outside a local bar after an unknown number of people opened fire.
October 17	Grambling	Louisiana	1	7	8	A person was killed and seven others wounded at Grambling State University during a homecoming event in the early morning.
October 17	Racine	Wisconsin	0	6	6	Six people were wounded at a one-year anniversary vigil for a man killed in the location. Neighbors refused to cooperate with police due to fear of retaliation.
October 17	Pine Bluff (1)	Arkansas	1	7	8	Gunfire erupted at a party hall wounding eleven and killing one, responding police opened fire on a man holding a gun and wounded him.
October 17	Jackson	Mississippi	3	3	6	Three people were killed and three injured after a man opened fire inside a night club.
October 16	Killeen	Texas	1	3	4	Four people were wounded in the parking lot of a club in the early morning. One of the wounded died two days later.
October 15	Mobile (2)	Alabama	0	5	5	Five people were wounded at a high school football game.
October 14	Minneapolis (6)	Minnesota	1	4	5	Responding police found five people wounded in Ventura Village. One of the wounded later died at the hospital.
October 12	Naples	Florida	1	5	6	A man was killed and three others wounded after two shooters opened fire on a Naples Park home. The shooters were also wounded.
October 12	Meridian	Mississippi	3	1	4	Three adults were killed in a home and an infant was found wounded.
October 11	South Fulton	Georgia	0	6	6	Three wounded were found by responding officers, a fourth flagged down officers and two others were found at local hospitals.
October 10	McColl	South Carolina	2	3	5	Two people were killed and three injured in a shooting near a nightclub.
October 10	Saint Paul (4)	Minnesota	1	14	15	One person was killed and 14 injured in a shootout at a bar.
October 10	Sioux City (2)	Iowa	0	4	4	Four bystanders were wounded at an after hours club in an early morning targeted shooting.
October 10	Chicago (59)	Illinois	1	4	5	A man was killed and four others injured in an early morning drive-by outside a Wicker Park nightclub.
October 10	Dover (3)	Delaware	1	4	5	A man was killed and four others wounded after a drive-by shooting at a house party in the early morning.
October 9	Dallas (7)	Texas	0	4	4	Three 18-year-olds and a 16-year-old were wounded in South Dallas.
October 9	Albany (4)	New York	1	6	7	Responding officers found one man deceased and six wounded were later found in local hospitals.
October 9	Denver (1)	Colorado	1	3	4	Responding officers found one man killed and three wounded.
October 9	Livingston	Louisiana	2	4	6	Two people were killed and three others wounded after a man went on a multi-parish shooting spree. He was later arrested with a self-inflicted gunshot wound and a dog bite.
October 8	Baltimore (8)	Maryland	0	4	4	Four men were wounded in Southeast Baltimore in the afternoon.
October 8	Washington (14)	District of Columbia	1	3	4	Responding police discovered a deceased man and another wounded, with two more identified at local hospitals.
October 7	Milwaukee (5)	Wisconsin	3	1	4	Three adults were killed and another wounded after two men came back thirty minutes after an argument over parking and opened fire.
October 7	Chicago (58)	Illinois	0	4	4	Two teenagers and two adults were wounded in the early morning after someone opened fire on another car on the Near North Side.
October 7	Milwaukee (4)	Wisconsin	0	5	5	Five people were wounded when a police officer opened fire on an armed suspect who returned fire before he fled the area.
October 6	Baltimore (7)	Maryland	1	5	6	A woman was killed and five people were wounded in East Baltimore.
October 6	Cleveland (7)	Ohio	0	4	4	Four adults were wounded at a music studio shortly before midnight.
October 6	New Orleans (9)	Louisiana	2	2	4	Two men were killed and two others wounded after four people exited a vehicle and opened fire on them. The victims were doing work in a parking lot behind a church.
October 5	Rockford	Illinois	1	3	4	Responding police found four injured due to an evening shooting and one later died at the hospital.
October 5	Saint Paul (3)	Minnesota	0	4	4	A teen shot four people inside a vehicle at an intersection.
October 4	Minneapolis (5)	Minnesota	0	4	4	Three men and a juvenile were wounded at a local gas station.
October 3	Bishopville	South Carolina	1	4	5	A man was killed and four others wounded in an early morning drive by shooting at a Waffle House.
October 2	Aurora (2)	Colorado	1	3	4	A man was killed and two adults and a teenager were wounded at an early morning hotel party,
October 2	San Antonio (4)	Texas	1	3	4	A man was killed and two adults and a teenager wounded at an apartment complex.
October 1	Washington (13)	District of Columbia	1	5	6	Five adults were wounded and one killed in Southwest D.C. late at night.
October 1	Cedar Rapids	Iowa	0	6	6	Five adults and a teenager were wounded after an argument at a hotel birthday party celebration escalated.
September 29	Chicago (57)	Illinois	0	5	5	Four bystanders and a suspect were wounded when passengers of two separate cars opened fire on one another while driving down a Fulton River District road.
September 28	Chicago (56)	Illinois	1	3	4	A woman was killed and three others injured in the early morning after a man opened fire on a car in Park Manor.
September 28	Minneapolis (4)	Minnesota	1	3	4	A man was fatally shot and three others injured in a gunfire incident on Bloomington Avenue in the Phillips neighborhood.
September 27	Chicago (55)	Illinois	1	3	4	A man was killed and two adults and a teenager wounded in Humboldt Park on the Northwest Side.
September 27	New York City (15)	New York	0	5	5	A man opened fire outside a club in Inwood in Upper Manhattan wounding four. Responding officers opened fire and wounded him.
September 26	Des Moines	Washington	3	3	6	Two groups of people began fighting in a bar and others joined in as it spilled into the parking lot. Some fighters got into cars and opened fire while driving away killing three and wounding three others.
September 26	Chicago (54)	Illinois	0	6	6	Six adults were wounded in East Garfield Park on the West Side in the early morning.
September 26	Oakland (8)	California	0	4	4	Four people including a teenager were wounded in East Oakland.
September 25	Utica (2)	New York	0	4	4	Four men were wounded in the early morning.
September 25	Chattanooga	Tennessee	2	5	7	Responding police found two adults killed and four adults and a child wounded.
September 25	Riverside	California	0	6	6	Shortly after midnight six people were wounded at a large house party.
September 25	Athens	Tennessee	4	0	4	Two adults arrived at a home and engaged in an argument with the four adults there over a 10-month old. The dispute escalated and the four adults living at the home were killed and the two suspects kidnapped the child. One of the perpetrators was given four life sentences in 2024.
September 24	Aiken	South Carolina	4	1	5	A man murdered his parents and sister and wounded another sibling before committing suicide.
September 24	Los Angeles (3)	California	0	4	4	Four people were wounded at the Rosa Parks Metro Station in Willowbrook.
September 23	Collierville	Tennessee	2	14	16	Collierville Kroger shooting: A worker at a third-party venue inside the store opened fire in a Kroger, killing one and injuring 14, before taking his own life.
September 23	Philadelphia (16)	Pennsylvania	0	4	4	Four men were wounded in the Mantua neighborhood.
September 22	Fayetteville (2)	North Carolina	2	2	4	Two teenagers were killed and two others injured in a home invasion. Three days earlier a relative of the two deceased had been killed in another home.
September 21	Washington (12)	District of Columbia	0	5	5	A man opened fire and wounded four adults and one child near Alabama Avenue, Southeast.
September 20	El Monte	California	1	4	5	A man was killed and four others wounded, with the deceased found behind the wheel of a vehicle.
September 20	Philadelphia (15)	Pennsylvania	1	5	6	A man was killed and five others injured in a drive-by shooting in the Fern Rock neighborhood.
September 20	St. Louis (5)	Missouri	1	3	4	A man was killed and three others wounded while at a vigil for another homicide victim, when a group of people opened fire from a black SUV.
September 19	Yemassee	South Carolina	1	7	7	After an argument escalated someone opened fire shortly after midnight killing one adult and wounding one adult and seven children.
September 19	Miami (6)	Florida	0	4	4	During an argument one of the victims pulled out her gun and pointed it at the ground, after things calmed down she put it away and began to enter a car with her husband, and two children. The man she was arguing with opened fire once they got to the car, wounding her, her husband and two children.
September 19	Dallas (6)	Texas	2	4	6	Two adults were killed and three others and a teenager wounded shortly after midnight when a man opened fire.
September 19	Oakland (7)	California	1	3	4	A man was killed and three others wounded in the early morning while outside a club.
September 19	Chicago (53)	Illinois	0	5	5	Five people were wounded while sitting on a porch in Austin during the early morning, after two men exited a vehicle and opened fire.
September 19	Rochester (3)	New York	2	2	4	Two people were killed and two injured after someone shot down an alley at a group standing outside, who were attending a party. The shooting occurred on the anniversary of a similar mass shooting in 2020.
September 18	New York City (14)	New York	1	3	4	A man was killed and three others wounded at a BBQ at Claremont Park in the Bronx, after an argument escalated.
September 18	Danville (2)	Illinois	2	2	4	Two people were killed and two wounded at a liquor store in the early morning.
September 18	New York City (13)	New York	0	4	4	Four people were shot outside a club in the East Flatbush area of Brooklyn after a dispute.
September 18	Opelousas	Louisiana	0	5	5	Five family members were injured after a gunman opened fire on their mobile home at night.
September 17	Augusta (2)	Georgia	0	4	4	Four people were wounded in the early morning at a night club. Two men were later arrested.
September 14	Baltimore (6)	Maryland	0	4	4	Three teenagers and a boy were injured in a shooting.
September 14	Cleveland (6)	Ohio	0	6	6	Six people were wounded after an incident at a liquor store escalated.
September 13	Milwaukee (3)	Wisconsin	0	5	5	Five people were wounded in a shooting at a candlelight vigil near the intersection in Sherman Park. The vigil was held for a 16-year-old who was killed at the same intersection earlier that day.
September 12	Saint Paul (2)	Minnesota	4	0	4	An SUV with four deceased adults was found in a local cornfield in Wheeler, Wisconsin. It was discovered later that the four victims were shot in Saint Paul following an argument at a bar with the shooter. The perpetrator's father followed his son in a vehicle on the way to Wheeler and then gave his son a ride home after his son abandoned the SUV in the cornfield. The shooter was sentenced to 103 years in prison in 2023.
September 12	Temple	Texas	0	4	4	Four people were found wounded from a shooting.
September 12	Detroit (11)	Michigan	2	4	6	Two women were killed and four others wounded in a drive-by shooting that targeted a family birthday party.
September 12	Blue Island	Illinois	2	2	4	Three people were found wounded on the street by police, and a fourth victim was located after he fled to the hospital. Two of the victims perished at the hospital.
September 11	Dothan	Alabama	0	5	5	Five teenagers were wounded at a party at a local shopping center.
September 11	Chicago (52)	Illinois	1	3	4	A man was killed and three others injured in South Side drive-by shooting.
September 11	Chicago (51)	Illinois	1	5	6	A woman was killed and four adults and a teenager wounded in a West Pullman drive-by while walking as a group.
September 11	Paterson (4)	New Jersey	0	4	4	Responding officers discovered two wounded from an early morning shooting. Two others arrived were identified at the hospital.
September 11	Utica (1)	New York	0	4	4	Responding officers found four men wounded.
September 10	Orlando (2)	Florida	0	4	4	Deputies were called after a man got drunk and fired shots into the air. He then opened fire on the security guard and officers, before driving down the road, getting into a car accident and opening fire on those in the car. He wounded the security guards and three in the vehicle.
September 9	East St. Louis (1)	Illinois	0	7	7	Six adults and a child were wounded in a drive-by shooting. One of the adult victims was also hit by a MetroLink train.
September 9	Montgomery (5)	Alabama	1	3	4	Responding officers found one child deceased and two adults and another child injured.
September 8	St. Louis (4)	Missouri	0	4	4	Four people were wounded after two men got into an argument after one was seen arguing and pistol whipping a woman.
September 7	Wichita (2)	Kansas	1	5	6	After getting kicked out of a night club shortly after midnight, a man opened fire killed a man and wounded five women.
September 7	Wilmington (3)	Delaware	0	4	4	Four people were wounded in a local park in the Southbridge neighborhood after a drive-by shooting.
September 6	Atlanta (8)	Georgia	0	5	5	A man opened fire after an argument at a local Black Pride festival, wounding five.
September 5	Detroit (10)	Michigan	0	4	4	Four men were injured in a shooting outside a rollerskating rink on Eight Mile Road in the west side.
September 5	Independence	Missouri	0	4	4	An adult and three teenagers were wounded at a local festival after two people got into an argument and one opened fire.
September 5	New York City (12)	New York	0	4	4	Four adults were wounded outside a catering hall in the Bronx after an argument escalated.
September 5	Wyatt	Missouri	0	4	4	Four adults were wounded at a family car show after two men opened fire on the crowd in suspected gang violence.
September 5	Houston (16)	Texas	4	0	4	Firefighters discovered a husband and wife and two children deceased when responding to a house fire. Family members believe the family had been dead for days before the fire.
September 5	Athens	Georgia	0	7	7	A man fired into a crowd of people that were fighting in the early morning. He wounded seven and turned himself in the next day.
September 5	Lakeland	Florida	4	2	6	A former Marine sharpshooter shot and killed three adults, an infant, and a dog and wounded a child inside and outside a home, before engaging in a shootout with police. The shooter was eventually injured in the gunfight and then apprehended.
September 5	Cincinnati (6)	Ohio	0	4	4	Three adults and a teenager were wounded after an argument outside a Mt. Washington home. The victims went inside, before the suspect fired through the door.
September 4	Birmingham (3)	Alabama	2	2	4	Two people were killed and two injured after an argument inside a strip mall store escalated. Three people were arrested and one went on the run.
September 4	Monroe (2)	Louisiana	1	3	4	Responding officers found four people injured, with one later dying at the hospital.
September 4	Washington (11)	District of Columbia	3	3	6	Six people were found injured in Northwest DC, with three later dying at a hospital.
September 4	Warner Robins	Georgia	1	4	5	A teenager was killed and four others injured while attending a block party.
September 4	Pittsburgh (2)	Pennsylvania	0	4	4	A teenager shot four people on the street in Homewood South.
September 4	Chicago (50)	Illinois	0	5	5	Five people were injured in a drive-by shooting in Lawndale shortly after midnight.
September 3	Syracuse	New York	0	4	4	Four adults were wounded in an early morning shooting during an outdoor party.
September 3	Austin (2)	Texas	1	3	4	A woman was killed and three others injured in an apartment complex close to US Highway 290 in East Austin.
September 3	New Iberia	Louisiana	1	3	4	One person was killed and three injured outside a shoe store in a strip mall, after two men exited a car and opened fire.
September 2	Niagara Falls	New York	0	4	4	Four people were wounded after shooters opened fire on them across the street while they were standing outside a deli.
August 31	Elm City	North Carolina	2	2	4	A man killed one person and wounded two others before kidnapping a woman and infant. He later killed the woman and left the baby alive in the stolen vehicle and is still on the run.
August 30	Normal	Illinois	3	3	6	A man killed two people and wounded three others in a mobile home park, before being killed by responding police.
August 29	Nashville (4)	Tennessee	0	5	5	Five people were wounded in an early morning drive by shooting on Jefferson Street.
August 29	Las Vegas (2)	Nevada	1	3	4	Three adults were wounded and one was killed near Rainbow Boulevard.
August 29	Milwaukee (2)	Wisconsin	0	4	4	An adult and three teenagers were wounded.
August 28	Albany (3)	New York	0	5	5	Responding officers found two wounded men, a wounded teenager and two other adults were later found at hospitals.
August 28	San Diego (3)	California	0	4	4	Two groups got into an argument near Belmont Park and a man opened fire, wounding four people.
August 28	Chicago (49)	Illinois	0	4	4	Four adults were wounded in Douglas Park while attending a large gathering.
August 27	Sharon Hill	Pennsylvania	1	4	5	After a football game at a high school, a civilian was injured in a drive-by shooting. Police fired back, which district attorney Jack Stollsteimer says likely hit four people, including an eight-year-old girl who was killed.
August 27	Huntington	West Virginia	2	2	4	Two adults and two children were shot, with an adult and child later dying from their injuries.
August 27	Los Angeles (2)	California	0	4	4	Four men were found injured in the West Hollywood neighborhood.
August 26	Minneapolis (3)	Minnesota	0	7	7	Seven people were wounded just after midnight when two people opened fire at one another.
August 23	Chicago (48)	Illinois	0	4	4	A teenager and three adults were wounded in a drive by shooting in Uptown.
August 22	Chicago (47)	Illinois	1	4	5	A man was killed and three adults and a teenager were wounded in East Garfield Park, about four hours after a previous mass shooting.
August 22	Carbondale	Illinois	1	3	4	A SIU student was killed and three other people wounded at a party hosted at a private residence.
August 22	Portland (5)	Oregon	0	5	5	Five men were wounded at a vigil for a man that had been killed in the same location earlier in the day.
August 22	Grand Rapids	Michigan	1	3	4	One person was killed and three wounded in an early morning shooting.
August 21	Chicago (46)	Illinois	0	4	4	Four people were wounded in an East Garfield Park drive-by.
August 21	Chicago (45)	Illinois	1	5	6	A man was killed and five others wounded while standing in a Calumet Heights parking lot, after two men opened fire from an alley.
August 20	Flint (3)	Michigan	1	3	4	One person died and three were injured after a shooting.
August 19	Chicago (44)	Illinois	0	4	4	Four people were shot in a Bronzeville business.
August 19	Philadelphia (14)	Pennsylvania	1	4	5	A drive-by shooting outside a barbershop killed one and wounded four.
August 19	Edgewood	Maryland	1	3	4	A man was killed and three others wounded in an evening shooting.
August 18	Germantown	Maryland	1	3	4	A teenager was arrested for allegedly shooting four people on a basketball court, killing a man and wounding three teenagers.
August 18	Youngstown (2)	Ohio	2	4	6	Two people, including a 10-year-old girl, were killed, and four wounded after a shooting.
August 18	Los Angeles (1)	California	0	4	4	Four men were wounded after a shooting in Playa del Ray.
August 18	Durham (3)	North Carolina	1	3	4	A man was killed and three injured in a shooting.
August 17	New York City (11)	New York	0	5	5	Five men were wounded in a drive-by shooting outside a grocery store in Brooklyn.
August 16	New York City (10)	New York	0	8	8	Five women and three men were wounded outside a housing project in Brooklyn shortly after midnight.
August 16	Detroit (9)	Michigan	1	3	4	A man was killed and three others injured outside a local bar.
August 15	San Antonio (3)	Texas	3	2	5	Three people were killed and two injured after a fight escalated in the parking lot of a local sports bar on the East Side, by a man who drew a long gun and shot into the air.
August 15	Chicago (43)	Illinois	0	4	4	Three men and a woman were wounded standing outside a home shortly after midnight.
August 14	Akron	Ohio	0	5	5	Four adults and a teenager were wounded outside a nightclub shortly after midnight.
August 14	Indianapolis (8)	Indiana	1	4	5	A man was killed and three adults and a child wounded in a strip mall parking lot in the early morning.
August 14	New York City (9)	New York	0	4	4	Four men were wounded in Brooklyn shortly after midnight.
August 14	Trenton	New Jersey	0	4	4	Responding officers found four wounded in the early morning.
August 13	Paradise	Nevada	1	6	7	One person was killed and six teenagers wounded after a fight broke out at a local park shortly after midnight.
August 11	Philadelphia (13)	Pennsylvania	1	4	5	A man opened fire on a group playing a dice game outside a local bar. One man was killed and four injured.
August 10	Portland (4)	Oregon	2	4	6	Two men, identified as rap-artists connected to the Wu-Tang Clan, were killed and four others wounded, in a potential drive-by shooting.
August 10	Clarksdale	Mississippi	2	2	4	A woman and teenager were killed and two other individuals wounded in an evening shooting.
August 9	Flint (2)	Michigan	2	4	6	Two teenagers were killed and four others injured at a late-night party at a city park.
August 9	Boston (3)	Massachusetts	1	5	6	A woman was killed and five others were injured in a shooting on Irma Street near the Mattapan/Dorchester border. Police arrived at the scene at about 12:30 a.m. and pronounced the woman dead. On August 24, police charged a 37-year-old man with murder in connection to the shooting.
August 8	Chicago (42)	Illinois	1	4	5	A security guard and four others were wounded after a man got into an argument with two security guards outside a club on the South Side.
August 8	New Orleans (8)	Louisiana	0	5	5	Five people were shot in the early morning on Bourbon Street. This was the second weekend in a row with a mass shooting in the city.
August 8	Houston (15)	Texas	1	5	6	A man was killed and five others wounded after a fight in a night club escalated out of the club and into the parking lot.
August 8	Chicago (41)	Illinois	1	6	7	Two men were arguing outside a lounge on the South Side, before it escalated. One of the two was killed, and the other along with five bystanders was injured.
August 8	New York City (8)	New York	2	3	5	Two men were killed and three wounded at an outdoor event space in Brooklyn shortly after midnight.
August 7	Montgomery (4)	Alabama	0	4	4	Three men and a woman were wounded shortly after midnight.
August 7	Chicago (40)	Illinois	0	4	4	Four men were wounded in a drive-by shooting.
August 7	Norfolk (3)	Virginia	0	4	4	Four people were wounded in an early morning shooting in the Neon District.
August 6	Nashville (3)	Tennessee	0	4	4	Four people, two on the side walk and two in a vehicle, were wounded in a drive-by shooting in West Nashville.
August 4	Philadelphia (12)	Pennsylvania	0	4	4	Four adults were wounded a block away from Temple University Hospital.
August 3	Urbana	Illinois	1	3	4	A woman was killed and three others injured in the early morning in a home. Three men walked to the side of the home and shot repeatedly through the windows and walls.
August 2	Greenwood	South Carolina	3	1	4	Two adults and a child were killed and a child wounded in a home. The shooter was arrested in Florida shortly after. The shooter was sentenced to life in prison in 2022.
August 2	Columbia (2)	South Carolina	0	9	9	Nine people were wounded in the early morning at a local dance studio.
August 1	New Orleans (7)	Louisiana	0	5	5	Five adults were wounded in an early morning shooting near Bourbon Street.
August 1	New Orleans (6)	Louisiana	1	3	4	A teenager was killed and two teenagers and an adult were wounded by a teenager in the Central Business District. He was turned in by a family member.
August 1	Nacogdoches	Texas	1	3	4	A man was killed and three wounded in an early morning shooting. Five suspects were later arrested.
August 1	Providence (2)	Rhode Island	0	5	5	Five people were wounded in the parking lot of a Popeyes restaurant in the early morning.
July 31	Columbus (6)	Ohio	1	4	5	Five people were wounded in an early morning shooting outside a local bar, and one died later at the hospital. An argument escalated causing a gunfight between multiple people.
July 31	Chicago (39)	Illinois	0	4	4	Four adults were wounded in an early morning shooting while at a gathering in Jackson Park on the South Side.
July 31	Saginaw (2)	Michigan	2	2	4	Two people were wounded and two killed at a large public gathering.
July 31	New York City (7)	New York	0	10	10	Ten people, including seven bystanders, were wounded in a night-time gang shooting outside a laundromat. The incident took place in North Corona, Queens.
July 31	Indianapolis (8)	Indiana	0	5	5	Three adults and two children were wounded outside a funeral home. It is believed an argument escalated inside the building prior.
July 31	Lexington	Kentucky	0	5	5	Responding officers found five people wounded in an evening shooting.
July 29	Davenport	Iowa	0	4	4	A feud between the occupants of two vehicles escalated into gunfire injuring three adults and a child.
July 29	Pittsburgh (1)	Pennsylvania	3	2	5	After an argument a man shot and killed his parents. He called 911, and stated he wished to turn himself in, but opened fire at responding officers wounding two. He fled the scene in a vehicle that he crashed and was discovered dead due to a self inflicted gunshot wound.
July 28	Charleston	South Carolina	1	4	5	Five people were wounded in an afternoon shooting, with one later dying at the hospital.
July 28	Washington (10)	District of Columbia	0	4	4	Four adults were wounded in a shooting in Southeast DC.
July 26	Fort Worth (3)	Texas	2	3	5	A shooter killed one and injured three after opening fire at a backyard party, after becoming upset, leaving and returning. He was chased down by partygoers who threw bricks at him in defense, and was pronounced dead by responding police.
July 25	Detroit (8)	Michigan	0	7	7	Seven people were wounded at a candlelit vigil on the West Side for a hit and run victim. The shooter pulled up in a vehicle and opened fire on the crowd.
July 25	Wasco	California	5	1	6	When responding to a hostage situation at a home in Wasco, officers were fired upon by the shooter. Two officers were shot, and one succumbed to their injuries. Three people inside the house were slain by the shooter. The gunman was also killed during the shootout.
July 25	Chicago (38)	Illinois	0	5	5	Five men were wounded shortly after midnight while standing in an Austin backyard, after a man entered and opened fire.
July 25	Seattle (2)	Washington	2	3	5	Two people were killed and three injured after someone opened fire on a group leaving a nightclub.
July 24	Columbus (5)	Ohio	0	4	4	Four people were wounded in a parking lot in Short North in an early morning.
July 24	Amarillo (2)	Texas	0	6	6	Six people were wounded in an early morning shooting after an argument escalated at an after-hours club.
July 24	Macon	Georgia	2	2	4	Two people were killed and two injured shortly after midnight after a fight escalated.
July 23	San Rafael	California	2	4	6	Two people were killed and four injured inside a parking garage near a local nightclub. Responding officers attempted to stop multiple vehicles leaving the structure, with some carrying shooting victims.
July 23	Spartanburg (2)	South Carolina	2	2	4	Two people were killed and two wounded in a drive-by-shooting.
July 23	Darlington	South Carolina	0	4	4	Four people were wounded in a van after individuals in a pickup truck opened fire in the early morning.
July 22	Houston (14)	Texas	1	5	6	One person was killed and five injured outside a local restaurant in a drive-by shooting.
July 21	Chicago (37)	Illinois	2	3	5	Ten minutes after an earlier shooting, three teenagers (two would later die) and two adults were wounded in North Lawndale.
July 21	Adelphi	Maryland	1	4	5	A man was killed and four others wounded at a condo complex after an argument escalated.
July 21	Chicago (36)	Illinois	2	3	5	A 15-year-old and a 16-year-old were killed and three other adults were wounded on a street corner. The 16-year-old died the next day.
July 21	Chicago (35)	Illinois	0	8	8	Shortly before midnight someone opened fire on a party bus passing by a gas station in Old Town. Seven people were wounded in the bus, and one while pumping gas.
July 20	Jacksonville	Texas	4	0	4	Four adults were killed in a robbery after three men broke into their home. The three men were arrested later the next day.
July 19	Chicago (34)	Illinois	0	4	4	Four men were injured in Homan Square while standing outside at night.
July 19	Perth Amboy	New Jersey	0	6	6	A gunman opened fire at a group of people leaving a bar early in the morning. Six people were wounded.
July 18	Toledo (3)	Ohio	1	3	4	One person was killed and three wounded in a shooting.
July 18	Gainesville (2)	Florida	1	4	5	A man was killed and four others wounded in a drive by shooting outside of a convenience store.
July 18	Burlington	North Carolina	0	4	4	Four were wounded in a shooting after an argument.
July 18	Tucson (1)	Arizona	2	4	6	Two EMTs were injured after a man opened fire on them as they responded to an unrelated medical incident. The man then drove to a nearby structure fire and shot at nearby people, killing a bystander and wounding a firefighter.
July 18	Houston (13)	Texas	3	2	5	Responding officers arrived at a motel where a man was threatening to kill others and responding officers. The man shot and killed two adults and wounded two others before being shot and killed by police.
July 18	Walnut Creek	California	1	3	4	One person died and three were wounded after a shooting outside a nightclub.
July 17	Washington	District of Columbia	0	3	3	In the middle of the sixth inning in a game against the Padres. 2 vehicles engaged in a short shootout just outside the 3rd Base Gate at Nationals Park. Both drivers were injured and a female fan leaving the game was treated for graze wounds at a local hospital no fans inside the stadium were harmed and at no point was the event declared active. The game was eventually suspended after a 10-15 minute safety hold. Local camera footage helped rapidly identify one suspect car quickly resulting in a BOLO on the Toyota Camry and connection to the Friday night shooting
July 17	Portland (3)	Oregon	1	6	7	A woman was killed and six others were injured in a shooting in Downtown Portland.
July 17	Chicago (33)	Illinois	0	6	6	Five teenage girls aged 12 to 19 years old were wounded while standing outside a party in Austin on the West Side.
July 16	Sacramento (1)	California	2	4	6	Shortly before midnight two men were killed and four others injured in Old Sacramento near the old train tracks.
July 16	Washington (9)	District of Columbia	1	5	6	A six-year-old girl was killed and five adults were injured in a shooting in the nation's capital.
July 16	Manchester	New Hampshire	0	4	4	Four people were wounded as passengers in a van taking them from a nightclub.
July 16	Greenville	South Carolina	1	3	4	One person was killed and three injured at Conestee Park after an argument escalated.
July 16	Chicago (32)	Illinois	1	3	4	One man was killed and three others injured in Austin shortly before midnight.
July 16	Philadelphia (11)	Pennsylvania	1	4	5	An adult was killed and three adults and a fourteen-year-old injured in an evening shooting.
July 15	Boston (2)	Massachusetts	0	4	4	Officers responding to a ShotSpotter alert discovered four people wounded at the Bromley Heath Projects in Mission Hill.
July 15	Levelland	Texas	1	3	4	Officers responding to a 911 call were fired upon by a suspect who barricaded themselves in a home. One officer was killed and three injured.
July 15	Lake Ozark	Missouri	1	4	5	A man was killed and four others injured after an argument and physical fight between multiple motorcycle clubs escalated.
July 14	Chicago (31)	Illinois	0	5	5	Five adults were wounded outside a food mart in Gresham after three men jumped out of a car and opened fire.
July 14	Chicago (30)	Illinois	0	5	5	Five people were wounded in West Garfield Park on the West Side, after a man approached them and opened fire.
July 14	Claymont	Delaware	2	2	4	A man and teenager were killed and two adults wounded in an evening shooting in the Knollwood neighborhood.
July 13	Indianapolis (7)	Indiana	0	4	4	Four men were wounded in an early morning shooting, three of the four were found in a vehicle.
July 13	Detroit (7)	Michigan	1	6	7	A man was killed and six others wounded at a banquet hall, after a shooter opened fire due to an earlier argument. Attendees fired back and wounded the suspect, who was later arrested.
July 12	Iselin	New Jersey	0	4	4	Four people were wounded in the early morning at a hotel.
July 12	New York City (6)	New York	0	4	4	Multiple masked shooters wounded four in Queens after exiting a car and opening fire.
July 12	Beaver Falls	Pennsylvania	2	3	5	Two men were killed and three injured after a gun fight between two cars in the parking lot of a housing complex.
July 12	Castroville	California	3	1	4	Three men were killed and one injured after a gunman opened fire at a house party.
July 11	El Paso (1)	Texas	1	5	6	A man was killed and five others wounded at an activities complex in the early morning.
July 10	Philadelphia (10)	Pennsylvania	0	6	6	Six men were wounded after two shooters walked up to them and opened fire shortly before midnight in the North Philadelphia neighborhood of Hunting Park.
July 10	Boston (1)	Massachusetts	0	4	4	Four people were wounded in Dorchester, neighbors at first believed it was continuing Independence Day celebrations.
July 10	Springfield (2)	Ohio	1	3	4	A man was killed and a woman and two children were injured at a gas station in a potential incident of domestic violence.
July 8	Hartford	Connecticut	0	4	4	Four men were wounded by five teenagers who opened fire at the same location they had wounded a woman two days prior. The teenagers were later arrested.
July 5	Buffalo (2)	New York	0	4	4	Three adults and a three-year-old were injured while standing outside in a large group after someone opened fire.
July 5	Santa Rosa	California	1	3	4	A drive-by shooting left one person dead and three others injured at an illegal fireworks show.
July 5	Chicago (29)	Illinois	2	4	6	A shooting in Washington Park left two dead and four injured, including a 12-year-old girl and a 13-year-old boy.
July 5	Toledo (2)	Ohio	1	11	12	One person was killed and eleven others injured at an Independence Day block party.
July 4	Thermal	California	0	4	4	An overnight shooting left four injured, two critically.
July 4	Cincinnati (5)	Ohio	2	3	5	Two people were killed and three injured in a shooting at a large teen party at a city park.
July 4	Cleveland (5)	Ohio	0	4	4	Four adults were wounded in an evening shooting.
July 4	Peoria	Illinois	0	4	4	Two juveniles and two others were injured on Sunday night.
July 4	Omaha	Nebraska	1	4	5	A group of people were fired upon in a parking lot, leaving one dead and four injured.
July 4	Danville (1)	Illinois	0	4	4	Four people were wounded in a shooting at a rap concert.
July 4	Kansas City (2)	Missouri	0	4	4	Four adults were wounded at a local club, and all refused to talk with law enforcement about the incident.
July 4	Fort Worth (2)	Texas	0	8	8	Eight people were wounded near a local car wash in the early morning.
July 4	Rantoul	Illinois	0	5	5	Two juveniles and three adults were wounded in a shooting.
July 4	Dallas (5)	Texas	0	5	5	A shooting at an Independence Day gathering in southeast Dallas left at least four people wounded.
July 4	Dallas (4)	Texas	3	2	5	A shooting at a neighborhood block party left three people dead and two injured.
July 3	Chadbourn	North Carolina	3	1	4	Responding officers found three men killed and one injured at a large party in the early morning.
July 3	Lancaster	Pennsylvania	0	4	4	Four adults were wounded in an early morning shooting.
July 3	Swainsboro	Georgia	1	3	4	One person was killed and three injured in a shooting at a sports bar.
July 3	Chicago (28)	Illinois	0	4	4	Shortly before midnight four men were wounded in a drive-by shooting in Gresham.
July 2	Philadelphia (9)	Pennsylvania	1	4	5	A man was killed and four others injured after an afternoon shooting in East Mount Airy.
July 2	Norfolk (2)	Virginia	0	4	4	Three teenagers and a six-year-old were injured in an afternoon shooting. A fifteen-year-old was later arrested in connection with the shooting.
July 2	Champaign	Illinois	1	4 (Note: Including a pregnant woman)	5	A teenager was killed and four adults, including a pregnant woman were injured at an American Legion after a funeral.
July 1	Chicago (27)	Illinois	0	7	7	Unknown assailants fired into a residence in Englewood, injuring seven people including a baby girl.
July 1	Spartanburg (1)	South Carolina	2	4	6	Two people, including the believed shooter, were killed and four injured in a shooting at a local park.
July 1	Chesapeake	Virginia	1	3	4	Responding police officers to shots fired, found one man deceased and an adult and two teenagers injured.
June 30	Chicago (26)	Illinois	0	4	4	Four teenagers were wounded while walking in Little Village on the West Side in the evening.
June 30	Marrero	Louisiana	0	4	4	A car pulled up to another car waiting to turn and opened fire. An adult, ten-month-old, four and fifteen-year olds were all injured.
June 30	Dover (2)	Delaware	1	3	4	A group of people were fired upon, leaving one killed and three injured.
June 30	Houston (12)	Texas	3	1	4	Two adults and a six-year-old were killed and a ten-year-old injured in an evening shooting.
June 28	Rochester (2)	New York	1	3	4	A man opened fire into a crowded Walmart parking lot, killing one and injuring three.
June 27	Hormigueros	Puerto Rico	3	2	5	Three people were found shot dead in a vehicle. Two other people sustained injuries.
June 27	St. Charles	Illinois	1	3	4	A man was killed and three others wounded at a night club in the early morning.
June 27	Chicago (25)	Illinois	1	10	11	A woman died and ten others were injured after three shooters approached them from an alley and opened fire in Marquette Park.
June 27	Chicago (24)	Illinois	1	5	6	Five adults and a teenager were wounded in a drive-by shooting while standing outside in South Shore. A woman died later at the hospital
June 27	Memphis (5)	Tennessee	3	1	4	A tenant with a mental disorder killed three and wounded a neighbor in his boarding house.
June 27	Greensboro (2)	North Carolina	0	4	4	After an argument escalated at a pool party hosted at an apartment complex, four people were wounded.
June 26	Houston (11)	Texas	1	3	4	A man was killed and three wounded at a pay-per-view event at a nightclub after a fight broke out.
June 26	Chicago (23)	Illinois	1	3	4	A man was killed and three others wounded after an argument escalated in the morning in West Rogers Park.
June 26	Fort Deposit	Alabama	1	3	4	An argument escalated at a funeral service after an outside group refused to turn down music in their car. A man was killed and three others injured.
June 25	Columbus (4)	Ohio	0	4	4	Two children and two adults were shot in an SUV.
June 25	Chicago (22)	Illinois	0	4	4	Shortly before midnight, two men and two women were injured in a drive-by shooting in Park Manor, in which the shooter drove a moped.
June 25	New York City (5)	New York	0	5	5	Five people were shot in an early morning drive-by at a graduation party in the Bronx.
June 24	Gainesville (1)	Florida	1	4	5	Two shooters opened fire at a local American Legion Post, which was hosting a teen party. All five injured were teenagers.
June 23	Buffalo (1)	New York	0	4	4	Two adults and two children were wounded at the local JFK Park, after a man opened fire.
June 23	Chicago (21)	Illinois	0	4	4	Four people were shot while standing outside when two shooters opened fire in South Austin.
June 23	Montgomery (3)	Alabama	2	2	4	Two men were found dead and two more injured by responding police officers.
June 23	Chicago (20)	Illinois	0	4	4	Four motorcycle club members were wounded in Englewood.
June 21	Washington (8)	District of Columbia	0	4	4	Minnesota Vikings defensive tackle Jaylen Twyman was shot along with three others while visiting his aunt.
June 21	St. Louis (3)	Missouri	3	4	7	Three people were killed and four injured in a shooting outside a convenience store.
June 20	Richmond (3)	Virginia	1	3	4	A man was killed and three wounded while leaving Shockoe Bottom after someone opened fire on a group of people.
June 20	Cincinnati (4)	Ohio	1	3	4	A woman was killed and three others injured shortly after midnight.
June 20	Aurora (1)	Colorado	1	4	5	A man was killed and four others wounded during an early morning Juneteenth celebration at a local strip mall.
June 20	Wildwood	Florida	1	10	11	A woman was killed and ten others injured at an annual community Fathers Day celebration. The shooter was shortly arrested.
June 20	Richmond	California	3	5	8	Celebrators of a Marimba; a Guatemalan music and dance party, were shot by multiple shooters who fled in vehicles One of the shooters was given 4 life sentences in 2024.
June 20	Dallas (3)	Texas	0	8	8	Eight people were wounded in a shootout between two groups after an argument escalated. Each group had rented a party space, and two of the injured were children.
June 20	Granger	Indiana	1	4	5	A man was killed and four others were wounded in an early morning shooting at a local brewing companies parking lot.
June 20	Atlantic City	New Jersey	1	3	4	One man was killed and three others injured while standing on a porch after a bicyclist opened fire.
June 19	Oakland (6)	California	1	6	7	A man was killed and five others injured at Lake Merritt near the city's Juneteenth celebration.
June 19	Anchorage	Alaska	1	4	5	Four people wounded and one killed in a shooting.
June 19	Baton Rouge (3)	Louisiana	2	4	6	Two people were killed and four injured in a parking lot after an argument escalated between unknown people and partygoers leaving a concert.
June 19	Newark (1)	New Jersey	0	4	4	Responding officers found two wounded men in an early morning shooting. Shortly after two more were identified at a local hospital.
June 18	Minneapolis (2)	Minnesota	0	5	5	Shortly before midnight five people were wounded in Dinkytown.
June 17	Durham (2)	North Carolina	2	2	4	A shooting killed two and wounded another two.
June 17	Petersburg	Virginia	0	4	4	Four men were wounded in a shooting.
June 17	Paterson (3)	New Jersey	0	4	4	Four people were wounded in a shooting.
June 17	Glendale, Peoria, Surprise	Arizona	1	12	13	One person was killed and twelve others injured in eight drive-by shootings in the West Valley area. A male suspect was taken into custody. Of the injuries, three were wounded by gunfire, while nine others sustained indirect injuries, such as shrapnel from broken glass due to a car crash.
June 16	Baltimore (5)	Maryland	1	5	6	Six people were shot, one fatally, in West Baltimore.
June 15	Chicago (19)	Illinois	0	5	5	Five people were wounded at West Garfield Park.
June 15	Chicago (18)	Illinois	5	3	8	Four women were killed and three others injured after gunfire erupted in a South Side residence. Another woman died in a hospital.
June 15	Albertville	Alabama	4	1	5	A shooting at a Mueller Water Products factory killed two and injured two others. The gunman killed himself at another location. One wounded victim died of his injuries in 2024.
June 14	Boynton Beach	Florida	1	3	4	A drive-by shooting on Interstate 95 killed one and injured three.
June 14	Lansing (1)	Michigan	2	2	4	Two people were killed and two others injured at a city park.
June 13	West Salem	Ohio	1	5	6	An altercation resulted in a shooting that killed one and injured five others at a racetrack.
June 13	Louisville (1)	Kentucky	1	3	4	One man was killed and three other people were injured after a shooting in a Newburg neighborhood.
June 12	Cincinnati (3)	Ohio	0	4	4	Four people were wounded in a drive-by. Two of the victims were children caught in crossfire.
June 12	Chicago (17)	Illinois	1	9	10	A shooting in Chatham on the South Side left one dead and nine injured.
June 12	Cleveland (4)	Ohio	3	4	7	Three men were killed while three women and another man were injured in the Kinsman neighborhood.
June 12	Austin (1)	Texas	1	13	14	At least 14 people were shot in Downtown Austin in the early morning hours, leaving one dead. A suspect has been arrested while police are still looking for another.
June 11	Dallas (2)	Texas	0	5	5	A shooting left five people injured, including a four-year-old girl.
June 11	Winston-Salem (1)	North Carolina	1	3	4	A shooting left one man dead and four others injured.
June 11	Savannah	Georgia	1	7	8	One person was killed and seven others wounded in a shooting at a housing project.
June 11	White Center	Washington	2	2	4	Two people were killed and two others hurt in a shooting in White Center near West Seattle.
June 10	Detroit (6)	Michigan	1	3	4	A drive by shooting on the west side left one dead and three injured, including a six-year-old boy.
June 10	Yonkers	New York	0	4	4	Four people were wounded in a drive by shooting that was potential gang activity.
June 8	Memphis (4)	Tennessee	1	4	5	Four people were wounded and one killed in an afternoon shooting. The suspect is known to the victims.
June 8	Nashville (2)	Tennessee	1	3	4	Three teenagers were wounded and an adult woman was killed after their cars were boxed in by other vehicles and fired upon. A fourth teenager was injured in a car accident as one of the cars attempted to flee the gunfire.
June 8	Houston (10)	Texas	0	5	5	Four people were shot, and a fifth wounded by bullet fragments in the early morning at a bar. The shooting was believed to be in retaliation of three men being denied entry into the bar.
June 7	Cleveland (3)	Ohio	0	6	6	Six people were wounded in an early morning shooting while standing on a porch.
June 7	Homestead	Florida	3	3	6	A man killed his girlfriend, and another man, and injured three teenagers in a Florida home. The man committed suicide upon police arrival.
June 6	Kendall	Florida	3	6	9	Three people were killed and six more injured at a graduation party inside of a restaurant/hookah lounge.
June 6	St. Louis (2)	Missouri	0	4	4	Three shooters opened fire on a group of teenagers near Kiener Plaza, injuring four.
June 6	Maury	North Carolina	0	4	4	Four people were injured by gunfire at a party in a trailer park.
June 6	Portland (2)	Oregon	4	0	4	Four people were shot dead at a home in southeast Portland.
June 6	Oakland (5)	California	0	5	5	Five men were wounded in the Fremont neighborhood in a drive-by shooting.
June 6	Salt Lake City	Utah	1	4	5	One person was killed and four more injured in a drive-by shooting.
June 6	Chicago (16)	Illinois	0	8	8	Two shooters opened fire on a group in Chatham, injuring eight.
June 5	Indianapolis (6)	Indiana	2	2	4	Two people were killed and two more injured while exiting a Boston Market earlier in the morning in northeastern Indianapolis.
June 5	New Orleans (5)	Louisiana	0	8	8	Eight people were wounded in an evening shooting while standing outside a vacant hotel.
June 4	Fruitport Township	Michigan	1	3	4	One person was killed and three injured.
June 2	Wilmington (2)	Delaware	1	3	4	A shooter opened fire on officers during a domestic dispute in an apartment, injuring three. The shooter was found dead from a self-inflicted gunshot wound the next day.
June 2	Toledo (1)	Ohio	0	4	4	Four people were shot and one other was seriously injured after being run over by a car outside a bar.
June 2	Magnolia	Arkansas	0	4	4	Police responding to a fight at a local park were then notified of gunfire. Four people were wounded and one of the shooters was arrested after a car chase.
June 2	Springfield (1)	Ohio	0	6	6	Two people are in custody after six people were injured in an overnight shooting at a wake.
May 31	St. Louis (1)	Missouri	0	4	4	Four men were wounded in a drive-by shooting.
May 31	Garfield Heights	Ohio	1	4	5	One person was killed and four others, including two teenagers, were injured in a shooting during a block party.
May 31	New York City (4)	New York	0	5	5	Five people were shot in the Bushwick area of Brooklyn.
May 30	Chicago (15)	Illinois	0	4	4	Four teens injured in drive-by.
May 30	Aliceville (2)	Alabama	1	4	5	One person was killed and four others were injured at a residence.
May 30	Hialeah	Florida	3	20	23	2021 Hialeah shooting: Three shooters stepped out of a white SUV, using assault rifles and handguns, and opened fire on a billiards club. Some of the gunmen are still at large.
May 29	San Antonio (2)	Texas	2	2	4	Two people were killed and two others injured in a drive-by shooting, after leaving a memorial service at a North Side bar.
May 28	Dellwood	Missouri	1	3	4	A man was killed and three other people injured shortly before midnight outside a club.
May 28	Miami (5)	Florida	1	6	7	Shortly before midnight, police responded to a ShotSpotter alert in Wynwood where they found one person killed and six injured.
May 27	Durham (1)	North Carolina	0	5	5	A drive-by shooting left five people injured.
May 26	San Jose	California	10	0	10	2021 San Jose shooting: An employee opened fire at a Santa Clara Valley Transportation Authority (VTA) control center in San Jose, California, killing nine others before committing suicide.
May 26	Chicago (14)	Illinois	0	4	4	Three teenagers and an adult were wounded in an apartment in the Englewood neighborhood on the South Side. One of the teenagers was pronounced dead before being resuscitated by doctors.
May 24	Inkster	Michigan	2	2	4	Two people were killed and two others were injured in a shooting while playing basketball.
May 24	West Jefferson	Ohio	4	0	4	At least four people were killed at an apartment complex. The shooter was given 4 life sentences without parole in 2024.
May 24	Bay Shore	New York	0	4	4	Four people were wounded at a basketball court near a local marina when someone opened fire.
May 23	Chicago (13)	Illinois	0	4	4	Four men were wounded outside a home in East Garfield Park after a man opened fire in the afternoon.
May 23	Paterson (2)	New Jersey	0	5	5	A shooting at large gathering left five people injured.
May 23	Norfolk (1)	Virginia	0	4	4	Four people were wounded in an overnight shooting.
May 23	Youngstown (1)	Ohio	3	8	11	Three people were killed and eight injured at a local bar in the early morning.
May 23	Park Forest	Illinois	0	4	4	An overnight shooting at a private party left four people injured.
May 22	San Angelo	Texas	0	4	4	Four people were injured after a shooting at a sports complex.
May 22	Columbus (3)	Ohio	1	5	6	A 16-year-old was killed and at least five other teenagers were wounded in a shooting at Bicentennial Park.
May 22	Minneapolis (1)	Minnesota	2	8	10	The incident happened in the early morning near a downtown nightclub, after two men opened fire on each other during an argument.
May 22	Fort Wayne	Indiana	1	4	5	A woman was killed and four others wounded shortly after midnight. An argument had escalated in the parking lot and gunfire struck people inside their apartments.
May 22	North Charleston	South Carolina	1	14	15	A teenager was killed and fourteen injured after a shooting at an unauthorized concert.
May 22	Fairfield Township	New Jersey	3	11	14	Two people were killed and twelve others injured at a large house party in a targeted attack. A third victim died two days later.
May 21	Albany (2)	New York	1	5	6	One person was killed and five others were injured. The injured walked themselves to the hospital.
May 21	Jersey City	New Jersey	2	4	6	Two people were killed and four injured in a late night shooting.
May 20	Evansville	Indiana	0	4	4	Four people were wounded after a fight escalated into a shooting.
May 18	Oakland (4)	California	2	5	7	Seven people were shot on a party bus celebrating a birthday, two fatally. Police have offered a $40,000 reward for information about the suspect(s).
May 18	Hemet	California	1	4	5	A pregnant bystander was shot and killed when a fight led to gunfire on a public street and four others were wounded.
May 17	Portland (1)	Oregon	0	4	4	Four people were shot on Swan Island in an incident that is described by law enforcement as gang-related.
May 16	Cincinnati (2)	Ohio	1	3	4	Responding officers to a fight and shooting call found a man dead and three others wounded at a nightclub.
May 16	Atlanta (7)	Georgia	0	4	4	Four people were wounded leaving the Trap Music Museum in an early morning drive-by shooting.
May 16	East Lansing	Michigan	0	5	5	Five people were shot at a party at an apartment complex.
May 16	Columbus (2)	Georgia	0	4	4	Four people were wounded in an early morning shooting at a Waffle House.
May 16	Birmingham (2)	Alabama	1	4	5	A suspect in a double homicide opened fire on a SWAT team attempting to carry out a search warrant. The suspect was killed and four officers wounded.
May 16	Stone Mountain	Georgia	1	5	6	A man was killed and five injured in a drive-by shooting while standing outside a gas station.
May 15	New York City (3)	New York	1	4	5	One person was killed and four other were injured in shooting in The South Bronx.
May 15	Washington (7)	District of Columbia	1	3	4	A man died and two women and another man were wounded in an afternoon shooting.
May 15	Chicago (12)	Illinois	2	3	5	Two people were killed and three wounded at an early morning gathering in the Auburn Gresham neighborhood.
May 14	Philadelphia (8)	Pennsylvania	0	4	4	Three men and a woman were wounded in an evening shooting in West Philadelphia.
May 13	Washington (6)	District of Columbia	0	4	4	Four men found in two separate locations were wounded after a man left a vehicle and opened fire in Southeast Washington, DC.
May 13	Augusta (1)	Georgia	2	2	4	Two women died and two others were injured in an apartment shooting.
May 13	Providence (1)	Rhode Island	0	9	9	Nine people were shot in Washington Park. According to police, the shooting is the largest in terms of injured in Providence's history.
May 12	Buford	Georgia	1	3	4	One person died and three were injured after a shooting at an apartment complex.
May 11	Baltimore (4)	Maryland	0	4	4	Four people were injured in a shooting at a housing complex in West Baltimore.
May 10	Montgomery (2)	Alabama	0	7	7	Seven people were injured in a shooting at a package store.
May 9	Colorado Springs (2)	Colorado	7	0	7	Six people were killed when a man opened fire at a birthday party in a trailer park. The shooter (Teodoro Macias) took his own life shortly afterwards.
May 9	Phoenix (4)	Arizona	1	7	8	Shortly after midnight a fight broke out at Hyatt Regency Phoenix in Downtown Phoenix with a man was killed and seven others wounded.
May 8	Citrus Heights	California	0	4	4	Four people were wounded in the parking lot of a night club during the early morning. Responding officers had to break up multiple fights upon arriving.
May 8	Oakland (3)	California	0	4	4	Four people were wounded in the early morning while standing outside for a gathering near Lake Merritt.
May 8	Detroit (5)	Michigan	0	4	4	Shortly after midnight four people were wounded in an alley in the city's Westside.
May 8	Gwynn Oak	Maryland	4	1	5	A man killed three people and injured a fourth near a townhouse before setting it on fire. Responding officers shot and killed him. The man was reportedly being watched by the FBI before the incident.
May 7	Kinloch	Missouri	2	3	5	A fight broke out at a large outdoor party resulting in two men being killed and three others wounded including one of the shooters.
May 6	Paterson (1)	New Jersey	0	5	5	Five people were wounded in a drive-by shooting during the evening. Thirty minutes prior another two had been injured in a separate drive-by shooting.
May 5	Chicago (11)	Illinois	0	4	4	Four people were shot while sitting on a porch in the South Shore neighborhood.
May 3	Saginaw (1)	Michigan	1	4	5	A man died and four others were wounded after a shooting at a house party.
May 2	Columbus (2)	Ohio	0	4	4	Three men and one woman were injured in an afternoon shooting after a man entered a restaurant and opened fire.
May 2	Philadelphia (7)	Pennsylvania	1	3	4	One person died and three others were injured after a shooting in Frankford.
May 2	Baltimore (3)	Maryland	1	3	4	One person was killed, and three others injured at Carroll Park.
May 2	Chicago (10)	Illinois	0	5	5	Two men and three women were wounded after a drive-by shooting on the West Side.
May 2	Saint Paul (1)	Minnesota	0	4	4	A shooting at a house party left four people injured.
May 1	Clewiston	Florida	1	3	4	A shooting left one person dead and three injured at the Brown Sugar Festival.
May 1	Holyoke	Massachusetts	0	5	5	Five people were shot outside the Clubhouse Lounge.
May 1	Ashwaubenon	Wisconsin	3	1	4	At a casino on Oneida land, a man shot and killed 2 people, and seriously wounded another, before being shot dead by responding police officers.
May 1	New Rochelle	New York	1	4	5	A shooting left at least one dead and four more injured at an outdoor gathering.
May 1	New Orleans (4)	Louisiana	2	4	6	Two people were killed and four more were injured in a shooting.
May 1	Atlanta (6)	Georgia	1	3	4	A teenage girl and three others were wounded in a shooting.
May 1	Wilmington (1)	Delaware	0	4	4	Two men and two women were shot and injured.
April 29	Atlanta (5)	Georgia	1	4	5	One person died and four other people were injured after a shooting at a southwest Atlanta home in a drive-by shooting.
April 28	Miami (4)	Florida	0	5	5	Five people were injured during a shooting at a Miami home.
April 28	Boone	North Carolina	5	0	5	Two deputies were killed and three other people including a suspected gunman were found dead after a standoff.
April 27	Fairfield	Alabama	1	4	5	A shooting left at least one person dead and four more injured.
April 27	Richmond (2)	Virginia	2	3	5	A three-month-old and her mother were killed after being caught in the crossfire between two groups. Three others are recovering after being shot.
April 26	Gresham (3)	Oregon	0	7	7	Seven people were shot during a vigil for a shooting victim.
April 25	Houma (1)	Louisiana	0	5	5	A shooting at a Houma nightclub left five people injured.
April 25	Phenix City	Alabama	0	4	4	An overnight shooting left four people injured at an outdoor party.
April 25	Little Rock	Arkansas	1	3	4	A drive-by shooting left one person dead and three others injured at Cheatham Park.
April 25	Kansas City (1)	Missouri	1	3	4	A man is dead and three more are injured after a quadruple shooting in the city's historic jazz district.
April 25	Palestine	Texas	0	4	4	A shooting that occurred at a local night club left four people injured.
April 24	New Orleans (3)	Louisiana	0	5	5	Five people were wounded in a shooting on Bourbon Street.
April 22	San Diego (2)	California	1	4	5	A man was arrested after two overnight shootings in downtown San Diego left one person dead and four others injured.
April 19	Kingshill	United States Virgin Islands	2	2	4	Four people were shot, two fatally, at a housing complex.
April 19	Houston (9)	Texas	2	3	5	Five people were shot, two fatally, in Independence Heights.
April 19	Atlanta (4)	Georgia	0	5	5	Five people were wounded, one critically, at an apartment complex in southwest Atlanta.
April 18	Montgomery (1)	Alabama	1	4	5	A shooting over the weekend left four people injured, including juveniles, and one woman dead.
April 18	Shreveport (3)	Louisiana	0	5	5	Five victims have shown up at a Shreveport hospital in connection with a shooting on Hearne Avenue.
April 18	Detroit (4)	Michigan	1	5	6	Police were investigating a shooting that wounded five, as well as a fatal car crash nearby, when a man drove through the crime scene and later fired at officers. Officers then fired back, killing the man. It is not known if this man was connected to the earlier shooting.
April 18	Kenosha (1)	Wisconsin	3	2	5	Three people were killed and two injured after a shooting at a tavern.
April 17	LaPlace	Louisiana	0	9	9	Nine people were shot and injured during a 12-year old's birthday party.
April 17	Columbus (1)	Ohio	1	5	6	A woman was killed and five were wounded after a shooting at a vigil for a homicide victim.
April 16	Detroit (3)	Michigan	0	4	4	Four people were shot at a vigil on the East Side.
April 15	Indianapolis (5)	Indiana	9	7	16	Indianapolis FedEx shooting: A shooting occurred outside a FedEx facility near Indianapolis International Airport. Nine people were reported dead, including the shooter, who committed suicide. The shooter has been identified as 19-year old Brandon Scott Hole, a former employee of the FedEx facility.
April 15	Washington (5)	District of Columbia	0	4	4	Three men and a teenage girl were wounded in Northeast DC.
April 15	Pensacola	Florida	0	5	5	Five people were shot outside an apartment complex. Police say there were four shooters.
April 15	Chicago (9)	Illinois	0	4	4	Four people were wounded in Humboldt Park.
April 13	Baltimore (2)	Maryland	0	4	4	Four men were shot by at least two people while playing a dice game in East Baltimore.
April 12	Chicago (8)	Illinois	1	3	4	Four people were shot, one fatally, on the I-290. In addition, a fifth person was hit by a car.
April 12	Nashville (1)	Tennessee	1	3	4	A three-year-old girl was shot and killed; a two-year-old girl and two adult males were shot and injured in the Cumberland View apartments of the North Nashville neighborhood.
April 12	Carroll County	Georgia	1	3	4	During a vehicle pursuit, three police officers were shot and the shooter was killed by police after stopping and leaving the vehicle with the driver.
April 11	Wichita (1)	Kansas	1	3	4	One man was killed and three others wounded at an Airbnb.
April 11	Seattle (1)	Washington	0	5	5	Five people were shot in a parking lot.
April 10	Koshkonong	Missouri	1	3	4	A man shot several people at a convenience store. Police say the man knew one of the victims, but the motive is unclear.
April 10	Memphis (3)	Tennessee	1	4	5	Five people were shot at an auto repair shop.
April 10	Waterbury	Connecticut	0	4	4	Four people were wounded in a shooting.
April 10	Allendale	Michigan	0	4	4	A shooting at an Allendale apartment complex near Grand Valley State University injured four people, leaving one critically injured.
April 9	Fort Worth (1)	Texas	1	5	6	Six people were shot, one fatally, during a shootout between two vehicles. Police say the shooting may have been gang related. One of the wounded was in a non-related vehicle, and another was in his home.
April 8	Bryan	Texas	1	5	6	A shooting at a cabinet manufacturing store left one person dead, four in critical condition, and one in stable condition. One of the injured is a Texas State Trooper. The suspected shooter is now in custody.
April 7	Milwaukee (1)	Wisconsin	2	2	4	Four people were shot at a Northside gas station, two of them fatally.
April 7	Rock Hill (1)	South Carolina	7	0	7	2021 Rock Hill shooting: Six people, including two children, were killed in a mass shooting at a Rock Hill home. The perpetrator, a former professional NFL player was found dead by suicide in a nearby home.
April 6	Detroit (2)	Michigan	1	3	4	Four people were shot in the Cornerstone Village neighborhood.
April 6	New York City (2)	New York	4	0	4	A man killed the mother of his child and two of her daughters, then later killed himself at the New York City Housing Authority's Van Dyke Houses Brownsville neighborhood of Brooklyn.
April 5	Chicago (7)	Illinois	0	7	7	Seven people were injured in a shooting in West Englewood.
April 5	Baltimore (1)	Maryland	0	5	5	Five men were injured in a shooting.
April 5	Allen	Texas	6	0	6	Two brothers are suspected to have made a suicide pact before they shot and killed four family members and then fatally shot themselves in a suburban home.
April 4	Monroe (1)	Louisiana	0	6	6	Two men were arrested for a shooting at a bar that wounded six people.
April 4	Birmingham (1)	Alabama	1	6	7	A woman was killed at a park, and six others, including a 5-year-old boy, were wounded.
April 4	Beaumont	Texas	0	4	4	Four people were wounded in a drive-by shooting.
April 3	Tuscaloosa	Alabama	0	5	5	Two people were arrested after a shooting injured five people, including one of the perpetrators.
April 3	Quincy	Florida	0	7	7	Seven were wounded after a nightclub shooting.
April 3	Wilmington	North Carolina	3	4	7	Seven people were shot, three fatally, during a house party.
March 31	Orange	California	4	2	6	2021 Orange, California office shooting: Six people were shot. Four people, including a child, were killed and two hospitalized.
March 31	Washington (4)	District of Columbia	2	3	5	Five people were shot in the Congress Heights neighborhood. Two of the victims were killed and three others were injured.
March 30	Houston (8)	Texas	0	4	4	Several people were wounded in the Acres Homes area in separate shootings. Houston Police believe the shootings may be connected.
March 28	Essex	Maryland	5	1	6	A man killed his parents and two others before setting himself on fire. A fifth person was wounded by gunfire but survived.
March 28	Chicago (6)	Illinois	0	4	4	Four people were struck by gunfire on a vehicle on Interstate 57.
March 28	San Antonio (1)	Texas	0	4	4	Four people were injured, two critically, after a shooting at an apartment complex.
March 28	Cleveland (2)	Ohio	0	7	7	Seven people were injured after a shootout at a motorcycle club.
March 27	River Grove (1)	Illinois	1	3	4	Four people were shot, one fatally, on a party bus.
March 27	Chicago (5)	Illinois	0	4	4	Four people were wounded after a shooting in the Austin neighborhood.
March 27	Yazoo City	Mississippi	0	6	6	Several people were injured after a shooting at a nightclub.
March 27	Memphis (2)	Tennessee	3	2	5	In an early morning shooting in Northern Memphis, three people were killed and two people were injured. Of the injured, a man is in critical condition and a woman is in stable condition.
March 26	Philadelphia (6)	Pennsylvania	0	7	7	Seven people were shot outside a sports bar in Fishtown. Three of the victims are in critical condition, and four are in stable condition.
March 26	Virginia Beach	Virginia	2	8	8	Eight people were injured after a fight led to a shooting. Two other shootings, one of which was officer-involved, also occurred that night, though it is unknown if they were related to the original shooting.
March 26	Chicago (4)	Illinois	1	7	8	One person died and seven others were injured at a party in the Southwest Side of Chicago.
March 23	Atlanta (3)	Georgia	0	4	4	Four people including a child were injured at the entrance of the Cumberland Mall, although the mall was not evacuated. A similar shooting took place in December 2019.
March 23	Aliceville (1)	Alabama	2	2	4	Four people, including two high school students, were shot. One of the high school students later died.
March 22	Detroit (1)	Michigan	1	3	4	Four people were shot in a vehicle, one fatally.
March 22	Cleveland (1)	Ohio	2	2	4	Four people were shot at a restaurant, two fatally.
March 22	Boulder	Colorado	10	2	12	2021 Boulder shooting: Ten people were killed including a Boulder police officer, in a shooting at a grocery store. The shooter was shot in the leg by responding police.
March 20	Houston (7)	Texas	0	5	5	Five people were shot at a nightclub.
March 20	Dallas (1)	Texas	1	7	8	One person died and seven others were wounded after a shooting at a nightclub.
March 20	Philadelphia (5)	Pennsylvania	1	4	5	Five people were shot, one fatally, at a party in the Nicetown neighborhood.
March 18	Gresham (2)	Oregon	0	4	4	Four people were hospitalized after a shooting at a motel.
March 18	New Orleans (2)	Louisiana	0	4	4	Four people were shot in the 7th Ward.
March 17	Stockton	California	0	5	5	Five people were wounded after a drive-by shooting at a vigil. Police say the victims are uncooperative.
March 16	Phoenix (3)	Arizona	4	1	5	Four people died after a shooting at a home. One man was injured and is expected to survive.
March 16	Atlanta (2) and Cherokee County	Georgia	8	1	9	2021 Atlanta spa shootings: A series of mass shootings occurred at massage parlors. Eight people were killed in the incidents and one person was wounded, six victims were women of Asian descent. The suspect was arrested in Crisp County and told police he planned to continue his massacre in Florida.
March 15	Indianapolis	Indiana	4	1	5	A man shot his girlfriend and murdered 4 members of her family.
March 15	Indianapolis (4)	Indiana	1	4	5	One person died and four were injured after an overnight shooting in the Northside.
March 14	Tampa (2)	Florida	0	4	4	Four people were shot outside a banquet hall.
March 14	Chicago (3)	Illinois	0	4	4	Four people were injured during a robbery in the South Side.
March 14	Chicago (2)	Illinois	2	13	15	Two people were killed and 13 injured at an early morning party in South Side.
March 13	New York City (1)	New York	0	5	5	Five people were shot at a hookah parlor in Williamsburg, Brooklyn.
March 13	Richmond (1)	Virginia	2	4	6	Two people were killed and four injured at a parking lot.
March 13	Indianapolis (3)	Indiana	4	1	5	Police found a woman who had been shot and learned there may be other victims at a different home. Police arrived at the home and found four dead, including a child.
March 13	Orlando (1)	Florida	1	3	4	One person was killed and three injured at an early morning party.
March 12	Greensboro (1)	North Carolina	0	4	4	Four people, including a minor, were injured in a shooting.
March 11	Chamita	New Mexico	1	3	4	Following an argument, a man shot at a car of people, killing one and wounding three.
March 11	Columbia (1)	South Carolina	1	4	5	One person was killed and four injured outside a motorcycle business.
March 11	Philadelphia (4)	Pennsylvania	2	2	4	Four people were shot in Overbrook, two fatally. One of the deceased was 16-years-old.
March 10	Philadelphia (3)	Pennsylvania	0	4	4	Four people were shot in Kensington.
March 10	Houston (6)	Texas	3	1	4	Three people were killed and one was injured in Southwest Houston. Two of the victims were 18-years-old.
March 8	Clearwater	Florida	1	3	4	One man died and three people were injured in a shooting. Police believe the shooting was targeted.
March 7	Edwards	Mississippi	0	4	4	Three adults and a two-year-old child were injured at a child's birthday party, in a local apartment building. The shooter was arrested the next day.
March 6	Yuba City	California	2	3	5	Two were killed and three injured after a drive-by shooting at a backyard gathering.
March 6	Fayetteville (1)	North Carolina	1	4	5	One man was killed and four people were injured in an early-morning shooting.
March 5	Compton	California	1	4	5	A shooting at a restaurant killed a man from Pennsylvania and injured four others. Police say the shooting was gang-related.
March 4	Washington (3)	District of Columbia	0	5	5	Several people were injured in a shooting at a convenience store in the Southwest section of the district.
March 3	Erie	Pennsylvania	1	3	4	One person died and three were injured after a shooting at a tavern.
February 28	Houston (5)	Texas	0	4	4	Four people were injured at a parking lot in Northwest Houston. Police say the incident was a case of road rage.
February 28	Cincinnati (1)	Ohio	4	2	6	A man shot and killed his wife and two others, wounding a fourth. He was later shot and injured by police in Detroit and was taken to a nearby hospital and died days later.
February 28	East Chicago	Indiana	0	4	4	Four people were shot at a gas station. One of the wounded was a 7-year-old girl.
February 28	McCormick	South Carolina	0	4	4	Four people were shot at an apartment complex. The shooting occurred at one of the wounded's apartments.
February 28	Shreveport (2)	Louisiana	0	5	5	Five people were wounded in a drive-by shooting. Four were outside, and one was in a store.
February 28	Dover (1)	Delaware	0	4	4	Four people were wounded in an IHOP parking lot during the early morning.
February 28	Frederiksted	United States Virgin Islands	2	2	4	Four people were shot, two fatally, at a vegetable market. One of the wounded was involved in a crash on her way to the hospital.
February 27	Columbus	Mississippi	0	4	4	Four people were injured after a shooting in South Columbus.
February 27	Pattison	Mississippi	2	3	5	A conflict between two men led to a shooting at a birthday party, killing two and injuring three.
February 27	Estate La Reine	United States Virgin Islands	2	4	6	Six people were shot, one fatally, after a dispute at a club. A second person later died of his injuries.
February 26	San Diego (1)	California	1	3	4	Four were shot, one fatally, after a drive-by shooting outside a market.
February 26	Houston (4)	Texas	1	5	6	Six men were injured at a local car wash, with one man found by police and five others identified at a local hospital.
February 26	Baton Rouge (2)	Louisiana	0	4	4	Four people were shot and injured on Paige Street.
February 21	Teachey	North Carolina	0	4	4	Four people were wounded after a shooting at a mobile home park.
February 21	Kennett	Missouri	1	4	5	One man died and four people were injured after an overnight shooting at a club.
February 20	East Norriton Township	Pennsylvania	1	3	4	One man died and three people were injured after a shooting at a bowling alley.
February 20	Springfield	Illinois	1	4	5	One man died and four people were injured after an overnight shooting in Springfield.
February 20	Metairie	Louisiana	3	2	5	A man shot and killed two people at a gun store. Several people then engaged the original shooter both inside and outside the store, causing injuries to two more people. It is still unclear whether the original shooter was shot dead by engaging responders or committed suicide.
February 19	Grand Junction	Colorado	1	3	4	Four people were shot, one fatally, at a party. Most of the people at the party were of college-age.
February 18	Baton Rouge (1)	Louisiana	1	3	4	A man was killed and three others injured inside a barbershop.
February 17	Philadelphia (2)	Pennsylvania	0	8	8	A shooter injured eight people, including a seventeen-year-old, near the Olney Transportation Center.
February 16	St. Petersburg (1)	Florida	3	1	4	A man suspected in a homicide shot several family members at a house where his grandmother and great-grandmother lived, killing them and his uncle. A woman with gunshot wounds was able to escape to a neighbor's house for help.
February 13	San Francisco (2)	California	0	6	6	A shooting in Bayview injured six people.
February 13	Indianapolis (2)	Indiana	0	4	4	One adult and three juveniles were discovered wounded by gunfire in a vehicle stopped at an intersection.
February 13	Cary	North Carolina	1	3	4	One person died and three others were wounded in an early morning shooting.
February 13	Oakland (2)	California	0	6	6	Six wounded men were found after a Shot Spotter alert in the Old Oakland Historic District. The victims are uncooperative with officers.
February 11	Columbus (1)	Georgia	1	4	5	Five people were shot, one fatally in an evening shooting near the Signature Event Center.
February 10	Atlanta (1)	Georgia	0	4	4	Four people were injured during a shootout between two vehicles. Two of the injured were minors.
February 9	Houston (3)	Texas	0	4	4	Four men were shot and injured in a drive-by shooting at Acres Homes.
February 9	Buffalo	Minnesota	1	4	5	Buffalo, Minnesota clinic attack: A nurse was killed and four other people were shot and seriously wounded inside of a health care clinic. The perpetrator had made previous threats to commit a mass shooting at the clinic.
February 8	Mobile (1)	Alabama	0	4	4	Three adults and a juvenile were shot and injured in an evening shooting.
February 6	Thibodaux	Louisiana	0	4	4	Three teens and one adult were shot at a house party.
February 6	Tacoma (1)	Washington	1	3	4	A shooting at an illegal club killed one and injured three.
February 6	Murfreesboro	Tennessee	1	4	5	One man was killed in a shooting at a party while two others were hospitalized. Another two were grazed by bullets but refused treatment.
February 6	Bloomingdale	Illinois	1	5	6	A shooting at a hotel killed one man and wounded five others.
February 5	Bolivar	Mississippi	3	1	4	A shooting at a club left three people dead and one injured.
February 5	Martinsville	Virginia	2	2	4	Two were killed in a shooting at a restaurant, while two others including one of the shooters were injured. One of the shooters engaged in a gunfight with the police.
February 5	Mohnton	Pennsylvania	1	3	4	Four men were shot at a hookah lounge, one fatally.
February 4	High Point	North Carolina	2	3	5	During a hostage situation, a man killed a woman and shot three officers. The man was later killed by police.
February 3	Colorado Springs (1)	Colorado	3	1	4	A shooter attacked four people at an apartment complex near Fort Carson, killing three.
February 3	Oak Creek	Colorado	2	3	5	Police discovered a wounded man, who told them he had been shot by another man. The shooter was discovered shortly afterward in a home where he killed one and injured two before being killed by a resident of the home.
February 3	Memphis (1)	Tennessee	1	3	4	One person died in North Memphis and three others were injured in a shooting.
February 2	Muskogee	Oklahoma	6	1	7	2021 Muskogee shooting: Five children and one adult were shot and killed, and one other adult suffered life-threatening injuries, after a home shooting. The slain adult was the adult brother of the perpetrator.
February 2	Sunrise	Florida	3	3	6	2021 Sunrise, Florida shootout: Two FBI agents were shot and killed and three others wounded attempting to serve a warrant. The suspect barricaded himself in his home and opened fire before shooting and killing himself.
February 1	Rochester (1)	New York	1	3	4	A man was killed and a woman and two men injured in the early morning.
January 30	Albany (1)	New York	1	4	5	A woman was shot and killed, and four other people were injured after a shooting.
January 29	McKees Rocks	Pennsylvania	2	3	5	Two people were killed and three others injured after a shooting outside a club.
January 28	Flint (1)	Michigan	1	4	5	A woman was killed and four others, including a baby boy, were injured in a drive-by shooting.
January 27	Santa Ana	California	0	4	4	Four men were wounded in the early morning at an illegal gambling den.
January 25	Washington (2)	District of Columbia	1	4	5	A shooting at a market killed a Virginia Union University student and wounded four others in the Southeast section of the nation's capital.
January 24	Las Vegas (1)	Nevada	0	5	5	Five people were hospitalized in a shooting, two in critical condition.
January 24	Indianapolis (1)	Indiana	6	1	7	Six people including a pregnant woman were killed and a teen was injured in a shooting at a house on the northeast side of Indianapolis. A 17-year-old suspect was taken into custody. In 2024, a mistrial was declared after a witness verbally confronted the suspect during his testimony. In 2025, the shooter was sentenced to 360 years in prison.
January 22	Covington	Kentucky	0	5	5	Five people were injured in a shooting at a bar. A suspect was arrested.
January 21	Oakland (1)	California	1	3	4	One person died during a shoot-out in East Oakland, while three others were injured. The man who died was hit by a stray bullet.
January 20	Crowley	Louisiana	0	4	4	Four people were injured in a shooting just outside Crowley city limits.
January 18	Tobyhanna	Pennsylvania	0	4	4	Four people were wounded in a string of connected shootings at three different locations.
January 17	Phoenix (2)	Arizona	0	5	5	Five men were injured during a shooting near a strip mall. Police think there may have been a shootout.
January 17	Phoenix (1)	Arizona	1	6	7	A shooting at a nightclub killed one and injured six.
January 16	Kankakee	Illinois	0	5	5	Four men and a woman were injured in an early morning shooting after an attendee at a house party opened fire.
January 16	San Francisco (1)	California	0	5	5	Five people were wounded after a shooting in the Tenderloin district.
January 15	Philadelphia (1)	Pennsylvania	0	4	4	Four teenagers were injured in a shooting in the Logan neighborhood of North Philadelphia.
January 11	Miami (3)	Florida	0	4	4	Four teenagers were shot outside an apartment complex in Brownsville in the third mass shooting in Metropolitan Miami in eight days.
January 9	Houston (2)	Texas	1	3	4	A shooting at a nightclub left one person, a teenager, dead, and three others injured.
January 9	Chicago (1) and Evanston (1)	Illinois	6	2	8	2021 Chicago - Evanston shootings: A shooting that started in Chicago ended in Evanston left five people dead and two injured before the shooter was shot and killed by police.
January 7	Washington (1)	District of Columbia	0	5	5	Three men and two boys were wounded in an evening shooting in Columbia Heights.
January 6	Manassas	Virginia	1	3	4	A man opened fire on his family killing one man and injuring two women and a teenage boy before fleeing. He was discovered later by officers after dying in a car accident.
January 6	Livingston	Texas	1	3	4	Three men attempted to break into a home, and engaged in a gunfight with an occupant. The occupant was killed and two adults and a three-year-old girl were injured.
January 5	Tampa (1)	Florida	0	5	5	A shootout injured five people near a convenience store in the Palm River-Clair Mel area.
January 4	Lauderhill	Florida	0	7	7	Seven people were injured in a shooting.
January 4	New Orleans (1)	Louisiana	0	4	4	Three men and a fifteen-year-old boy were involved in a shoot-out in the 7th ward, and subsequently wounded by gunfire.
January 3	Miami (2)	Florida	0	4	4	Four people were wounded outside a nightclub in the evening.
January 3	Miami (1)	Florida	0	8	8	Six adults and two teenagers were wounded at a basketball court in Little River Park in Northwest Miami-Dade, when two people walked up and opened fire.
January 3	Gresham (1)	Oregon	0	4	4	Four people were wounded at a private party.
January 3	Houston (1)	Texas	1	4	5	A fight broke out, outside a Midtown Houston nightclub and a man opened fire. Three officers working a second job as security were wounded, along with the shooter, and a woman, who was the mother of the shooter, was killed.
January 3	Santa Barbara	California	2	2	4	Two people were killed and two injured after another approached the group on foot and opened fire in the city's lower Eastside.
January 3	Shreveport (1)	Louisiana	2	3	5	Two groups of men opened fire at one another in the early morning. Two were killed and three wounded in the shooting.
January 1	Galesburg	Illinois	0	4	4	Four people were wounded in an early morning shooting while at home. Police believe the shooting was targeted.
January 1	Sioux City (1)	Iowa	1	4	5	A woman was killed and four others injured after a shooting occurred at a house party. Multiple guns fired into the house, and attendees fled and drove themselves to different hospitals.
January 1	Amarillo (1)	Texas	1	3	4	A man was killed and three others injured in an early morning shooting at a shopping center.
January 1	Fort Smith	Arkansas	0	7	7	Seven people were wounded in an early morning shooting at an event center hosting a New Year's party after two men in a disagreement shot at each other.

== Monthly statistics ==
2021 US mass shooting statistics by month
Month	Mass shootings	Total number killed (including the shooters)	Total number wounded (including the shooters)	Occurred at a school or university	Occurred at a place of worship
January	35	23	145	0	0
February	45	52	159	0	0
March	48	70	188	0	0
April	53	72	210	0	0
May	69	77	312	0	0
June	79	75	336	0	0
July	84	77	345	0	0
August	59	45	239	1	0
September	70	45	268	0	0
October	69	85	320	1	0
November	48	51	175	1	0
December	39	36	160	0	0
Total	698	705	2,830	3	0

The statistics columns for each month are updated after the month ends, in an effort to make sure the correct number of events, individuals affected, and descriptions are accurate. Thus, the number may be incomplete throughout the month until the last day of each month.

== State statistics ==
State	Number of shootings
IL	87
TX	57
CA	45
NY	38
PA	33
FL, LA, OH	30
MI	26
AL, GA	23
NC	21
MD	18
MO, SC, TN	16
VA	15
CO, IN, DC	13
NJ	12
MS, MN	11
WI	10
OR	9
AZ, DE, WA	7
AR, IA	5
KY, MA, NV	4
USVI	3
RI, CT, KS, OK	2
AK, ID, NE, NH, NM, SD, UT, WV	1

This table is based on the above list as of December 31, 2021.

== See also ==
- List of school shootings in the United States (before 2000)
- List of school shootings in the United States (2000–present)
- List of school shootings in the United States by death toll
- Casualty recording
- List of countries by firearm-related death rate
- List of countries by intentional homicide rate
- Percent of households with guns by country
- Estimated number of civilian guns per capita by country
