= 2021 Collierville Kroger shooting =

Mass shooting in Tennessee, U.S.

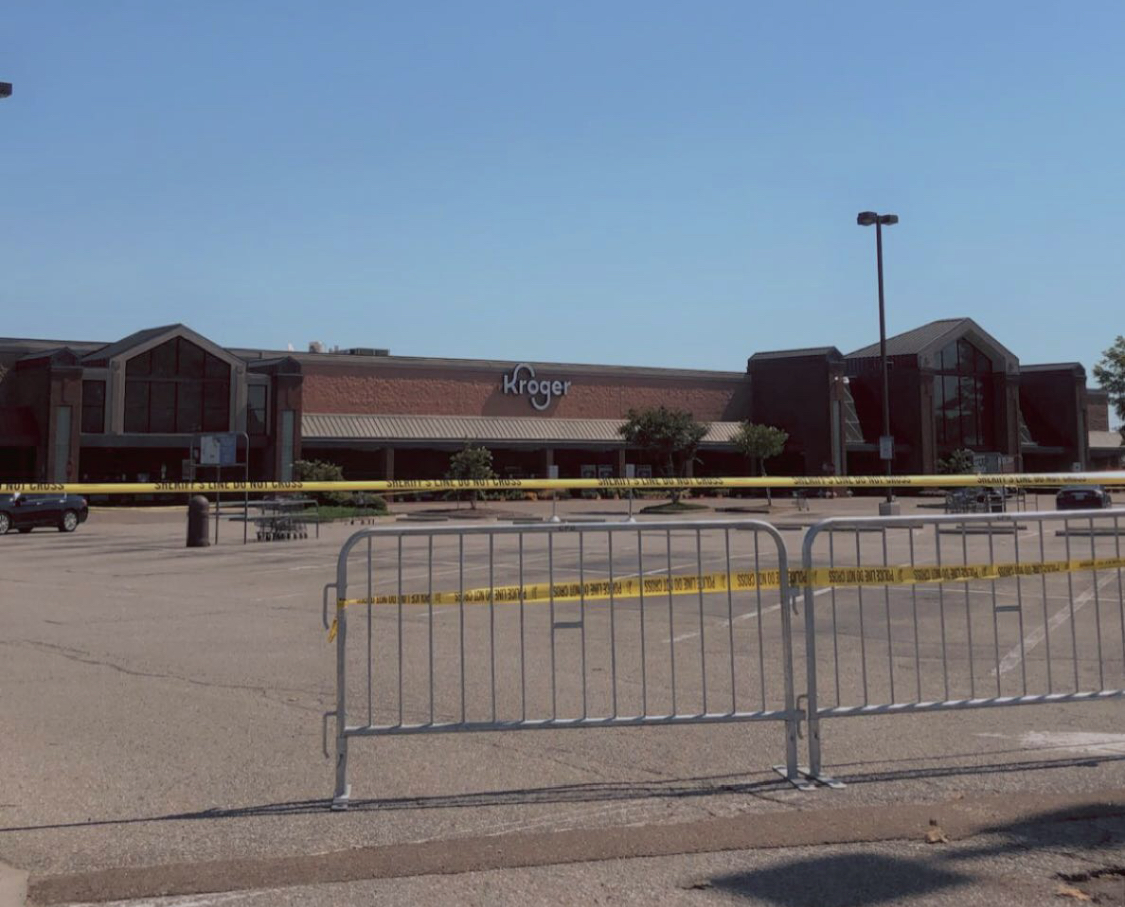
- The Kroger location two days after the shooting
- Location: 35°02′51″N 89°41′14″W; 240 New Byhalia Road, Collierville, Tennessee, U.S.
- Date: September 23, 2021 c. 1:30 – c. 1:34 p.m. (CDT; UTC−05:00)
- Target: Customers and staff at a Kroger grocery store
- Attack type: Mass shooting, murder–suicide, workplace shooting
- Weapons: ATI Omni pistol (7.62x35mm); Kel-Tec PMR-30 pistol (.22 WMR); Kel-Tec CMR-30 rifle (.22 WMR)
- Deaths: 2 (including the perpetrator)
- Injuries: 14 (13 by gunfire)
- Perpetrator: Uk Thang
- Motive: Despair over the loss of his job and the possibility of losing his business

On September 23, 2021, a third-party vendor at a Kroger in Collierville, Tennessee, United States, opened fire at the store, killing one person and injuring 14 others before committing suicide. The gunman was identified as 29-year-old Uk Thang. It was the second shooting in 2021 to occur at a Kroger-owned property; the first occurred at a King Soopers store in Boulder, Colorado, in March.

== Shooting ==
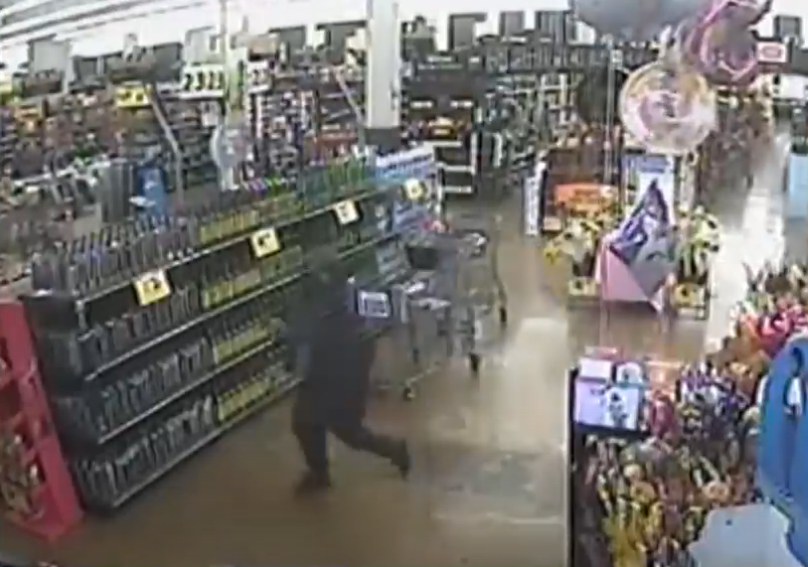
Thang running inside of the store

On the day of the shooting, the gunman, Uk Thang, got into an altercation with another Kroger employee and was asked to leave at 7:00 a.m. He returned to his apartment and later left at 12:30 p.m. After calling his brother at 1:30 p.m. to tell him he would never see him again, Thang returned to the store and opened fire with two pistols and a rifle. At the time of the shooting, 44 employees and a number of customers were inside the building.

He entered the Kroger store through the south entrance, wearing a black trench coat, a mask, and a green cap. Thang walked to the nearby Deli area and began opening fire. He injured two women in the Deli area. At this point, multiple people ran out of the store through the entrance Thang entered from. He fired shots at them and hit no one. Thang walked north through the store. In the south exit vestibule, 70-year-old Olivia King struggles to escape while pushing a cart. Thang walked by the exit and fired at her and another employee. He fatally wounded King and injured the employee as they both tried to get out of the store. The manager Thang had the altercation with earlier that day allowed several people to enter his office. Thang walked up to the office door and fired shots at it, which hit the manager in the jaw. Thang tried kicking open the door but failed as the manager was holding the door closed. Thang fired more shots at the door before leaving. Thang reloaded his ATI Omni pistol and shot a woman at the self-checkout aisles. Thang rushed to the back of the store and shot a man at an employees-only area. Several people tried leaving the store through the back of the store, but Thang followed them. At some point before, Thang dropped his ATI Omni pistol in the back of the store as the CCTV thereon only shows him with two guns at this point. Thang exited the store and tried using his Kel-Tec CMR-30 rifle to shoot at people to his right. However, the gun refused to work, possibly because of a mechanical failure. Thang switched to his Kel-Tec PMR-30 pistol. He fired shots to his right before firing to his left. During the process, he injured three people. Thang walked around outside of the store and fired into an enclosed trash area where several people were hiding. Four more people would be injured in that spot. Thang walked back to the store and committed suicide. The shooting lasted approximately 3 minutes and 55 seconds.

A cashier told reporters that Thang came in while she was working and began to open fire almost immediately. He shot a coworker and a customer in front of the employee. Another employee described Thang finding her and her coworkers while they were hiding and shooting at them, hitting at least two. A third employee saw other employees and customers running towards her from the front of the store.

Authorities began receiving 9-1-1 calls at around 1:30 p.m. reporting an active shooter situation at the Kroger store. The first police officers arrived on the scene at 1:34 p.m., and they began clearing the store by searching aisle by aisle. Officers discovered people hiding in freezers and locked offices as many had run away from Thang. He was later found dead at the back of the store from a self-inflicted gunshot wound.

== Victims ==
A 70-year-old female customer, Olivia King was killed, and 13 others – ten employees and three customers – were wounded in the shooting. One other individual checked into a hospital due to an anxiety attack. Regional One Health received nine patients, with four of them in critical condition. Methodist Le Bonheur received two patients; one underwent surgery, while the other was in stable condition. Saint Francis Hospital-Memphis received a twelfth patient. By September 26, all of the seriously and critically wounded patients were recovering.

== Perpetrator ==
Police identified the shooter as 29-year-old Uk Thang (October 17, 1991 − September 23, 2021), who had been living in Collierville since the summer of 2020 and was working as a third-party vendor at the Kroger store's sushi outlet. He had been asked to leave his job on the morning of the shooting. According to family friends and acquaintances, Thang was the son of refugees from Myanmar who settled in Utah and then Nashville. Neighbors described not knowing Thang, who they only saw coming and going from the apartment complex they lived in. According to police, he did not have a specific target during the shooting. He had a few misdemeanors on his criminal record, but no violent criminal history. A coworker described Thang as quiet and only interacting with his fellow sushi workers, but also sometimes arguing with other coworkers. Thang legally purchased the guns used in the shooting within the 18 months preceding the incident.

== Investigation ==
Multiple law enforcement agencies, including the Shelby County Sheriff's Office, the Memphis Police Department, and members of the FBI and ATF, responded to the store. Thang's vehicle was searched in the parking lot, and a bomb robot was used to remove a box from inside. Police later seized electronics and other evidence at Thang's home in an apartment complex.

== Aftermath ==
Bailey Station Elementary School and other local schools were put on lockdown as a precautionary measure due to the shooting, but it was lifted later in the day. Students at the high school were asked to wear maroon on September 24 as a sign of solidarity to the school and the town. Collierville city officials were offered support from Boulder, Colorado, where a mass shooting at a King Soopers store had occurred in March.

Kroger offered counseling services for its employees almost immediately after the shooting and has closed the store until the investigation is concluded. The Collierville police chief praised the store employees and customers, saying "I've never seen anything like it... We found people hiding in freezers and in locked offices. They were doing what they were trained to do: run, hide, fight."

After over a month of remodeling, Kroger announced that the store would reopen on November 10 with improved security.

== Store reopening ==
Following the shooting, the Byhalia Road Kroger location was closed to the public for nearly seven weeks to allow for the police investigation and an interior remodel. During the closure, Kroger continued to compensate store employees and offered them access to grief counseling and mental health support. In the weeks following the tragedy, the local community rallied around the message and hashtag "#ColliervilleStrong" as a show of resilience and support for the victims.

On November 5, 2021, Kroger officials announced the store would officially reopen its doors. Prior to the public reopening, a private gathering was held for employees to return to the space, reconnect, and support one another away from the public eye.

The store officially reopened on the morning of November 10, 2021. As part of the reopening, the interior was extensively remodeled, changing the layout and visual appearance of the space from how it looked on the day of the shooting to help returning staff and customers. Additionally, Kroger implemented enhanced security measures, including an increased physical presence of security personnel.

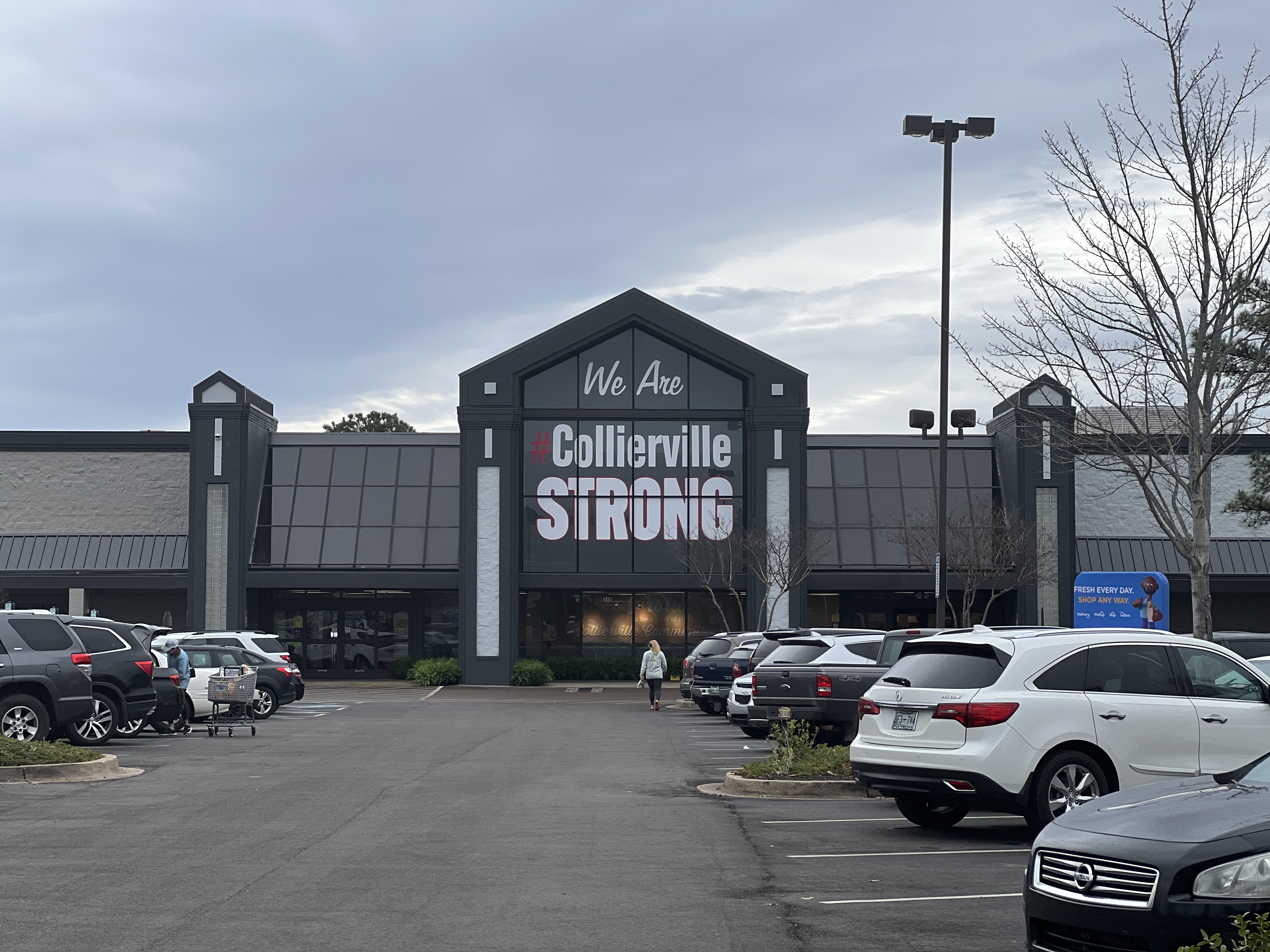
The remodeled Kroger in 2022

To mark the reopening, the front facade of the building was covered with a massive window display reading "We Are #ColliervilleSTRONG". Outside the front of the shopping center, a remembrance garden featuring a newly planted magnolia tree and a bench was dedicated to honor Olivia King, the customer who was killed, as well as the survivors. The grand reopening drew local community members and officials who gathered to show solidarity with the employees and honor the victims of the tragedy.

== See also ==
- List of mass shootings in the United States in 2021
