= 2021 Orange, California office shooting =

Mass shooting in California, U.S.

Coordinates: 33.8352°N 117.8538°W

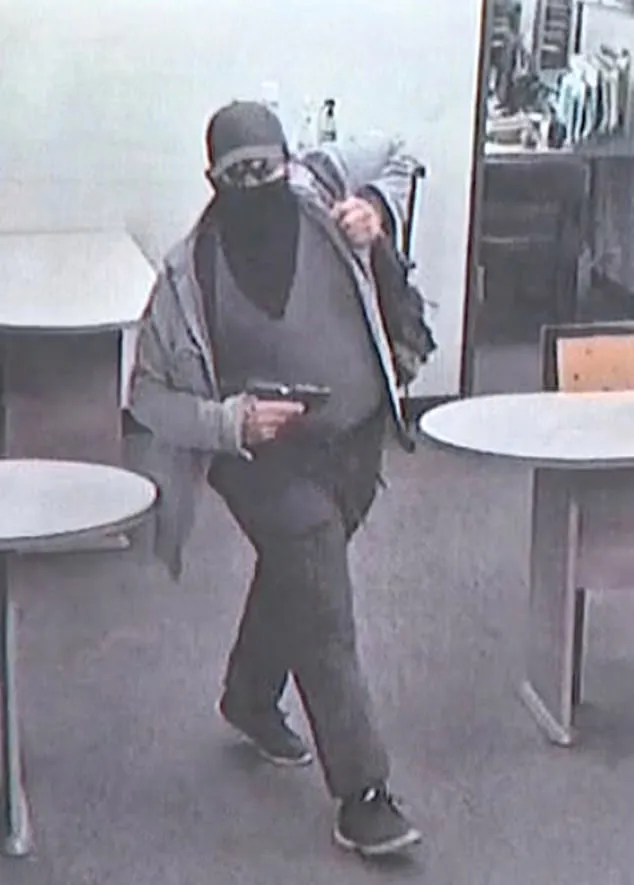
- Surveillance camera video showing shooter inside office building
- Location: Orange, California, U.S.
- Date: March 31, 2021; 5 years ago 5:30 p.m. (PDT; UTC−07:00)
- Attack type: Mass shooting; mass murder; pedicide; shootout; workplace shooting
- Weapon: Glock semi-automatic pistol
- Deaths: 4
- Injuries: 2 (including the suspect)
- Accused: Aminadab Gaxiola Gonzalez

On March 31, 2021, a mass shooting occurred at an office complex in Orange, California, United States. Four people were killed, including a child, and a fifth person was critically wounded. The suspect was critically injured following a shootout with responding police officers and taken into custody.

== Events ==
The Orange Police Department received a call around 5:30 p.m. PDT of shots fired and responded to a two-story office complex at 202 W. Lincoln Avenue in Orange, California. Police arrived at the location within two minutes of the first 911 call to find the shooter still firing within the building. They were unable to enter the building's courtyard initially due to the gates being locked from the inside using a bicycle-type cable lock. The shooting occurred on both of the building's floors, with some locations identified as belonging to a real estate business.

A neighbor to the office building stated he heard a volley of three gunshots, then another volley of three, and then a volley of four before someone stated; "Don't move or I will shoot you" three times. Another person who works at a neighboring auto mechanic shop heard about ten shots before officers evacuated the shop.

Responding officers were met with gunfire and apprehended the suspect, who was taken to the hospital in critical condition. Initially officers were unsure if the suspect was wounded by an officer or due to a self-inflicted wound. It was later confirmed that the suspect had been shot in the head by police. Investigators recovered a semi-automatic handgun and a backpack, which contained pepper spray, handcuffs and additional ammunition.

The initial response to the shooting included 20 officers with the Orange Police Department, along with 30 investigators, and some agents with the FBI and ATF.

== Investigation ==
Orange County District Attorney Todd Spitzer told reporters that the incident was being investigated as both a mass shooting and an officer-involved shooting. The investigation also focused on whether the locked gates constitute "lying in wait" which could become a special circumstance.

== Victims ==
There were four fatalities in the shooting. A fifth adult and the suspect were critically wounded. A dead child was found in the arms of a wounded woman in the complex courtyard; they were believed to be mother and son. The three other deceased adult victims were found inside the office complex, with two of the deceased identified as being father and daughter. The wounded woman was shot in the head during the attack, and the injury has been described as serious and permanent.

== Suspect ==
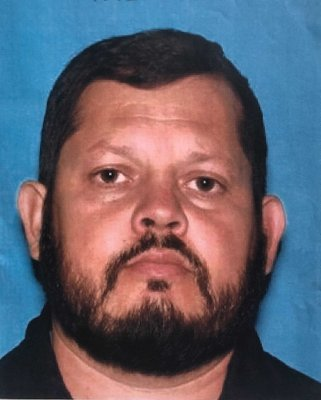
González

On April 1, 2021, 43-year-old Aminadab Gaxiola González (born December 6, 1977) was named as the suspect in the shooting. González is a resident of Fullerton, California. It was also announced that González knew the deceased and that the killing could have been motivated by a "business dispute". At the time of the shooting González was believed to be living in a motel in Anaheim and used a rental car to get to the office building.

== Aftermath ==
Shortly after the shooting, González was charged with four counts of murder and three counts of attempted murder. In December 2021, González was ruled incompetent to stand trial due to head injuries sustained in the police shootout, and the case was suspended indefinitely for his medical treatment.

== Response ==
Politicians such as Representative Katie Porter (D-CA) and Governor Gavin Newsom issued statements after the shooting offering condolences to the victims and their families and that they were monitoring the situation.

== See also ==
- List of homicides in California
- List of mass shootings in the United States in 2021
