= 2021 Buffalo, Minnesota, clinic attack =

Attack in Minnesota, U.S.

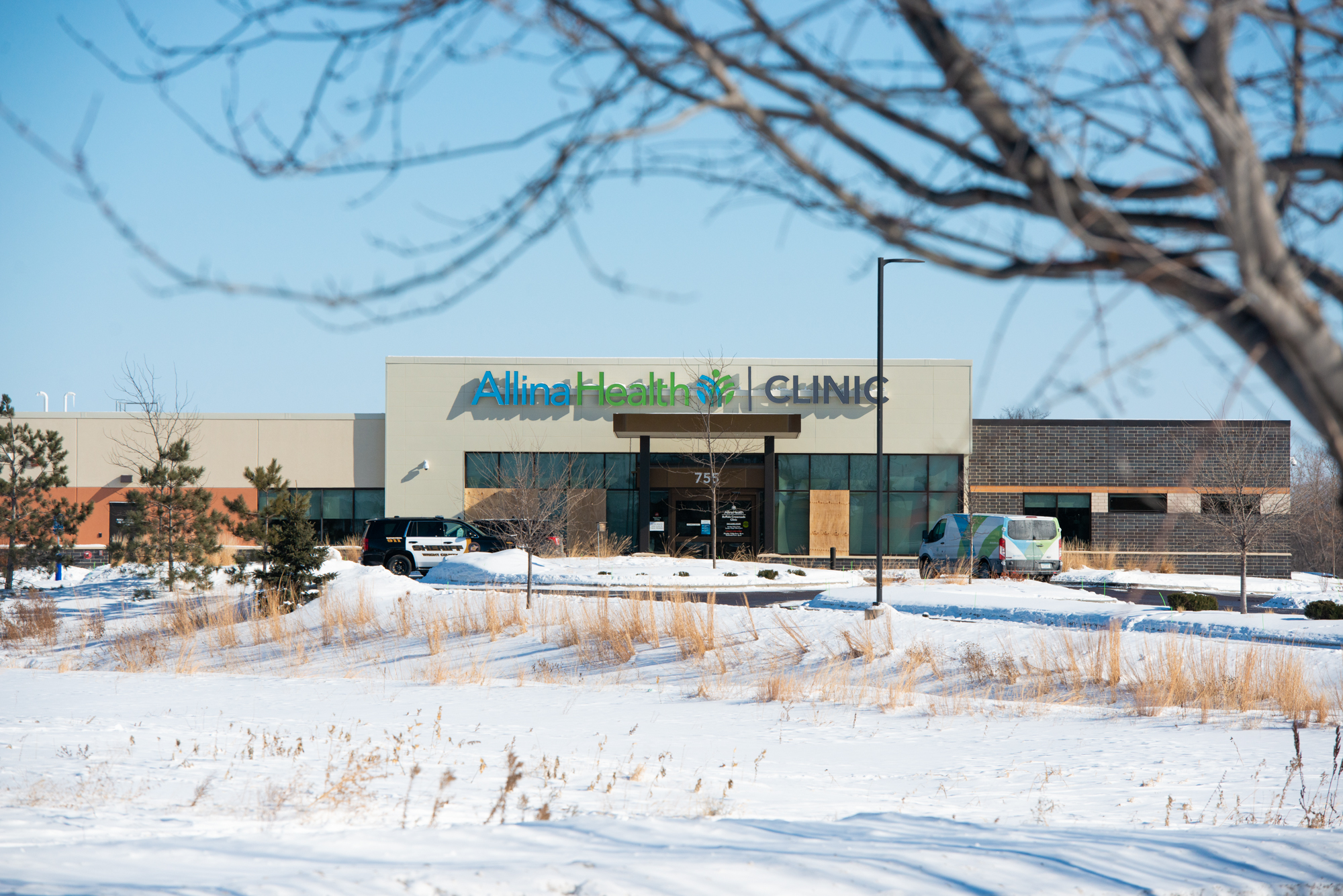
- Buffalo Crossroads medical clinic, February 12, 2021, three days after the attack.
- Location of Allina Health's Buffalo Crossroads medical clinic in Minnesota.
- Location: 45.178157°N 93.863211°W; Buffalo, Minnesota, U.S.
- Date: February 9, 2021 c. 10:52 – 11:00 a.m. (CST)
- Target: Clinic staff
- Attack type: Mass shooting, bombing
- Weapons: 9mm Smith & Wesson SD9VE semi-automatic handgun; Improvised explosives
- Deaths: 1
- Injuries: 4
- Assailant: Gregory Paul Ulrich
- Motive: Dissatisfaction with treatment; Retaliation against clinic staff
- Charges: First-degree intentional murder; First-degree premeditated attempted murder; Possession of an explosive device; Carrying a pistol without a permit
- Verdict: Guilty on all accounts
- Sentenced to life in prison without the possibility of parole

On February 9, 2021, a mass shooting and bombing occurred at a medical clinic in Buffalo, Minnesota, United States. Just before 11:00 a.m. CST, Gregory Paul Ulrich, a 67-year-old man, shot five people at Allina Health's Buffalo Crossroads facility. One victim, Lindsay Overbay, died, and four others were critically injured from gunshot wounds. All of the victims were medical clinic staff. During the attack, Ulrich discharged three improvised explosive devices, one of which failed to detonate. He surrendered to police who were dispatched to the clinic, and he was taken into custody. He admitted to authorities that he fired on people inside the clinic and set off bombs.

Ulrich faced several charges before the Wright County District Court: first-degree premeditated murder, four counts of first-degree attempted premeditated murder, and discharge of an explosive or incendiary device. Police investigators and prosecutors believed Ulrich's motive for the attack was in retaliation for his dissatisfaction with treatment at the clinic, and at the doctors that had stopped prescribing opioid painkiller medication for him. Several warning signs about Ulrich's past behavior and possible motives were not sufficient to prevent the attack from being carried out. Controversially, the Buffalo police department issued Ulrich a permit for the gun he used to carry out the shooting, despite Ulrich having a restraining order against him for past threats at the clinic and his previous criminal offenses.

At his trial in 2022, Ulrich admitted that he purchased the gun, assembled pipe bombs, and carried out the attack as retaliation against clinic staff. A jury convicted him on all charges and a judge sentenced him to life in prison without the possibility of parole.

== Background ==
Buffalo is a city in Wright County, Minnesota, with approximately 16,000 residents by 2021. It is within the Minneapolis–St. Paul metropolitan region and located about 40 miles northwest of Minneapolis.

Buffalo Crossroads is a medical clinic operated by Allina Health, a non-profit health care system based in Minnesota, and located on Crossroads Campus Drive in Buffalo. The clinic provides health services such as screenings, vaccinations, and primary care.

== Events ==
=== Attack ===
The morning of February 9, 2021, Gregory Paul Ulrich, wearing a large jacket and carrying a brief case, boarded a public shuttle bus at the Super 8 motel in Buffalo, Minnesota. At 10:52 a.m., Ulrich was dropped off at the nearby Allina Health medical clinic on Crossroads Drive. A clinic staff member, Tamara "Tammy" Schaufler, greeted the gunman at his arrival and asked Ulrich if he needed help. The gunman allegedly, immediately pulled out a handgun and made threats at clinic staff. After he entered a reception area, he fired his gun, first striking two victims, Schaufler and Antonya Fransen-Pruden. The gunman then fired at the windows in the lobby, shattering the glass. He proceeded further into the interior of the clinic, and hit two more victims with multiple gun shots. The gunman then fired his gun at a fifth victim—later identified as Lindsay Overbay, who died from gunshot wounds—hitting her in the abdomen.

By 10:54 a.m. the first 9-1-1 call reported an active shooting at the clinic. Initial calls to 9-1-1 indicated that an "older white male" entered the clinic with a handgun, saying that bombs were in the clinic and demanding that law enforcement back off. Among the dozen or so calls that operators from the 9-1-1 system answered, one was by the gunman himself, at 10:58 a.m. He told the operator to "send a lotta ambulances" and that "a bomb or two is gonna go off". He then gave his name to the operator, said he would wait face-down for the police to take him into custody, and that five people had been injured.

The gunman discharged two improvised explosive devices inside the clinic, one at the entrance and another near a desk. He also had a third device with him, but it did not detonate. Though the bombs did not injure any people, they caused significant damage to the sliding door entrance to the building, shattering several exterior windows, and to the interior area near the desk.

The gunman let a woman exit the clinic before lying on his stomach to await arrest. He had fired a total of 11 shots during the shooting.

=== Emergency response ===
Buffalo and Wright County police were dispatched to the Buffalo Crossroads clinic at 10:54 a.m. based on reports of multiple shots being fired. When authorities arrived, several victims had already been injured and several windows had been broken at the front of the building. At approximately 11:00 a.m., the gunman had surrendered to police that had arrived at the parking lot of the building. Victims streamed out of the hospital in a frantic scene as responding officers helped them evacuate.

In addition to local police, agents from the Minnesota Bureau of Criminal Apprehension, the Federal Bureau of Investigation (FBI), and the Bureau of Alcohol, Tobacco, Firearms and Explosives (ATF) responded to the event due to the reports of explosives at the scene.

=== Immediate aftermath ===
Five people were shot at the clinic, one of whom died, and three others had critical injuries. The victims were transported by AllinaHealth ambulances to area hospitals. One of the victims, 37-year-old Lindsay Overbay, a medical assistant at the clinic, died after being transported to Hennepin County Medical Center, the major trauma center in downtown Minneapolis. All victims were members of clinic staff.

The Star Tribune newspaper reported that the gunman set off three explosive devices inside the clinic, two in a lobby area and one in a workstation, while KSTP-TV and Bring Me the News reported that Ulrich detonated two devices while in the clinic. The gunman told first responders that three bombs went off, and that there was one in a briefcase that failed to ignite. One of the bombs planted by the gunman may have been detonated about 30 minutes after the shooting.

As he was arrested, the suspect, Ulrich, was found with a Smith & Wesson SD9VE 9mm handgun, two loaded magazines with 20 rounds each, and a bag with 29 additional rounds. Authorities also recovered his cellphone with a video message where he allegedly alluded to an incident at the clinic, according to court documents later filed charging Ulrich for several crimes. Police recovered other suspicious devices at the nearby Super 8 motel that Ulrich was staying at prior to the attack.

== Perpetrator ==
Gregory Paul Ulrich (born July 19, 1953) a local citizen, was identified as the sole suspect in the attack. By February 9, 2021, he was 67 years old and had a listed address of Buffalo, Minnesota, where he had been a longtime resident. Ulrich had been living in a mobile park for the past few years, but recently put his trailer up for sale.

The Buffalo Police Department and Wright County Sheriff's Office were "very familiar" with Ulrich from prior interactions. Ulrich had a history of mental health and substance abuse problems. He was known to frequently call the police to make unfounded theft reports or address interpersonal quarrels with people he interacted with. He was also convicted of several crimes, such as driving while impaired and possessing illegal drugs being committed between 2004 and 2015, that fell below the felony level.

Ulrich threatened to carry out a mass shooting at the Buffalo Crossroads medical clinic in October 2018. In a police report filed then, a doctor told investigators that Ulrich had talked about "shooting, blowing things up, and practicing different scenarios of getting revenge". Ulrich told police that he had been describing the dreams he had been having to the doctor and that he had no intention of carrying out anything he had allegedly said. Police took him for a mental health evaluation at a facility in Monticello. Allina staff believed that Ulrich might carry out his threats and filed paperwork barring him from the company's property, which was delivered to Ulrich's home by the police. Ulrich was eventually served with a restraining order stemming from the 2018 threat, and he was ordered not to visit the clinic or the nearby hospital and not to contact his former doctor. The criminal case against Ulrich was eventually dismissed as prosecutors said he was "mental incompetent" to stand trial.

In June 2019, a court services agent wrote that he had just learned that Ulrich had applied for a "permit to purchase" a gun and had yet to be approved. The agent said that he "highly recommended" that Ulrich not be allowed to acquire a firearm as a condition of his probation for previous criminal offenses. Despite Ulrich having a restraining order, and an arrest for violation of it, the Buffalo Police Department granted him a permit for the purchase of a handgun. Ulrich used the permit to purchase the 9-millimeter semiautomatic handgun that he would later discharge at the Buffalo clinic in 2021.

Ulrich had also raised concerns at Zion Lutheran Church in Buffalo due to an unsettling letter sent to a pastor. The church posted on its website in August 2019 that it had obtained a no trespassing order for Ulrich. Church staff were given a picture of Ulrich and told to call the police if he was seen on the church's property.

In the days leading up to February 9, 2021, Ulrich had been staying at a Super 8 motel near the Buffalo Crossroads medical campus.

== Investigation ==
Local police believed that Ulrich acted alone and that he did not commit the shooting as an act of terrorism. According to the court documents filed by prosecutors, an investigator believed Ulrich had an addiction to opioid medication, and that it might have been a motivating factor for the attack. Authorities believed Ulrich was angry at the clinic's physicians from stopping his opioid prescription following a 2016 back surgery and subsequent overdose that required hospitalization.

After the shooting, the Star Tribune and Associated Press raised several warning signs about Ulrich's behavior and past threats to the clinic, and how the warning signs were not enough to prevent the shooting at the clinic. In particular, news media questioned the Buffalo police department about why it issued a gun permit to Ulrich, which it declined to answer. The sheriff for Wright County, the local jurisdiction that included Buffalo, explained to media that gun permit applications were complicated to review and that sometimes disqualifiers for gun permits are missed by reviews.

== Legal proceedings ==
Ulrich initially faced several charges in connection to the attack: second-degree intentional murder, four counts of attempted first-degree murder, procession of explosive devices, and carrying a pistol without a permit. A public defender was assigned to represent Ulrich in court. Ulrich was confined at a secure state hospital in St. Peter, Minnesota where he awaited trial before the Wright County District Court.

A preliminary hearing was held in Wright County on May 20, 2021. At the request of his defense attorney, the judge overseeing the case ordered Ulrich to undergo an evaluation to determine if he was mentally competent for trial. The judge held an evidentiary hearing on August 11, 2021, and ruled that Ulrich was competent to stand trial.

Charges for Ulrich were later upgraded in late 2021 to first-degree premeditated murder for the death of Lindsay Overbay. He also faced four counts of first-degree attempted premeditated murder and discharge of an explosive or incendiary device. A grand jury indicted Ulrich on October 11, 2021, for charges related to the February attack. Bail was set at $5 million with the restrictive condition that Ulrich wear a GPS tracking monitor.

Jury selection for Ulrich's trial began May 12, 2022, and the trial commenced on May 16. During the trial, witnesses and victims testified about the attack. Ulrich took the stand in his own defense. He admitted to carrying out the attack and said it was in retribution for clinic staff failing to prescribe pain medications. Ulrich claimed he intended to cause injury and property damage, but not kill anyone. Prosecutors argued Ulrich intended to kill clinic staff and provided evidence of a video Ulrich made six weeks prior to the attack when he said that he would "kill as many nurses" as he could. After the trial concluded, the jury deliberated for six hours and on June 2, 2022, they convicted Ulrich on all charges.

At a June 18, 2022 sentencing hearing, Ulrich received life imprisonment without the possibility of parole.

Ulrich is currently incarcerated at the Minnesota Correctional Facility - Rush City.

== Aftermath ==
In mid 2021, a sunflower field was planted near the clinic as a memorial to Lindsay Overbay. The clinic reopened to patients on September 27, 2021.

== See also ==
- Domestic terrorism in the United States
- Gun laws in Minnesota
- List of mass shootings in the United States in 2021
- Opioid epidemic in the United States
- 2022 Tulsa hospital shooting
