= Estate La Reine =

- U.S. National Register of Historic Places
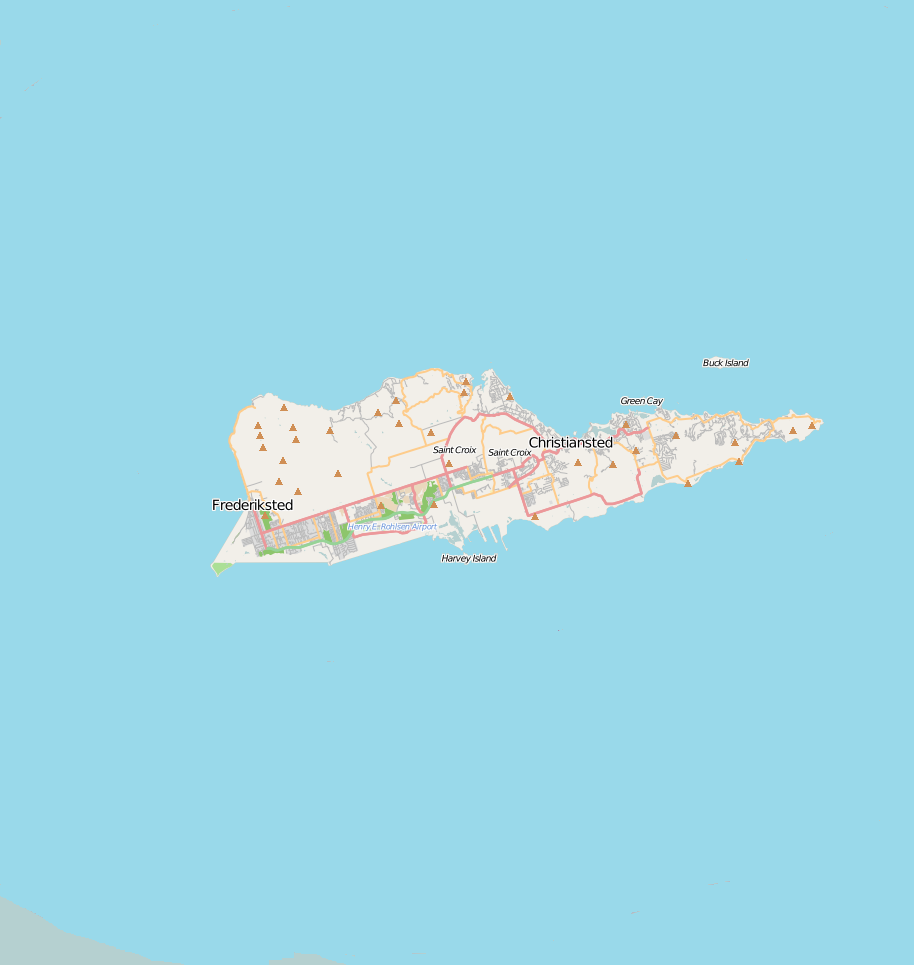
- Location within Saint Croix, US Virgin Islands Location within the U.S. Virgin Islands
- Location: 20 Kings Quarter and 19 Queens Quarter, St. Croix, Virgin Islands, near Christiansted, Virgin Islands
- Coordinates: 17°44′09″N 64°46′19″W
- Area: 27.6 acres (11.2 ha)
- Built: c. 1754
- Architect: William Wilkins
- NRHP reference No.: 80003994
- Added to NRHP: November 24, 1980

Estate La Reine, near Christiansted on Saint Croix in the U.S. Virgin Islands, dates from around 1750. It was listed on the National Register of Historic Places in 1980. The listing included three contributing buildings, two contributing structures, and a contributing site.

Its great house is unusual among those of St. Croix estates for having an architect, William Wilkins, associated with an expansion or renovation.

It also was known as The Queen.

Its 1980 NRHP nomination states: "One of about ten Cruzan plantations occupied continuously since its foundation, the estate, comprised of a great house, servants quarters, animal pens, the remains of a slave village and the scattered ruins of what was once thriving sugar industry, is situated along the outer periphery of a shallow bowl extending from the valley below. Now overgrown with brush, La Reine nonetheless preserves much of its earlier appearance, particularly in the form of its great house and subsidiary buildings to the west, all of which have been carefully maintained by the estate's successive owners. The original wind mill, factory, animal pens and slave quarters are less well preserved, but still provide an indication of their former extent and function."

It is located right in the middle of the island, about one-third of a mile north of Center Line Road.
