= List of filmed mass shootings =

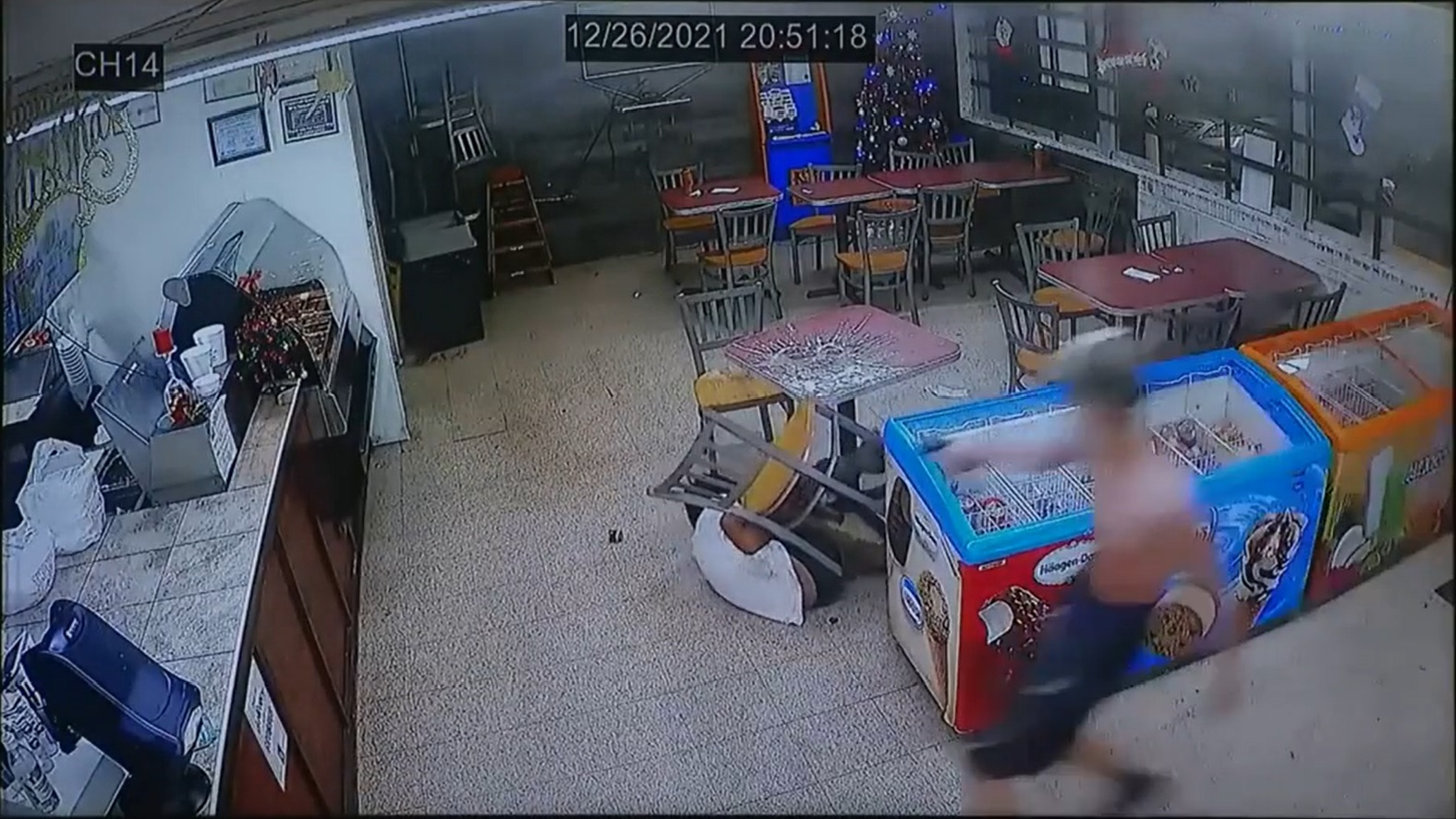
The 2021 Garland shooting, where three men were killed. The entire event was caught on the store's CCTV system.

A mass shooting is a violent crime in which one or more attackers kill or injure multiple individuals simultaneously using a firearm. Mass shootings have been documented using a variety of methods, including body cameras and closed-circuit television cameras (CCTV). Filmed mass shootings have been controversial due to their content, availability, and ability to quickly spread across social media platforms. In response to this, several governments have outlawed the distribution of filmed mass shootings, including the government of New Zealand after the Christchurch mosque shootings. Livestreaming has been a way for mass shooters to gain public attention, and several mass shootings have been livestreamed, either through webcams or body-worn cameras. Livestreaming has also been shown to inspire copycats.

== List ==
Image (Note: Due to copyright laws, some filmed mass shootings do not have a freely-available image.)	Date	Location	Fatalities	Injuries	Total	Device	Summary	Refs.
	July 29, 1965	Tokyo, Japan	1	17	18	News cameras	Zama and Shibuya shootings: A man shot two policeman, killing one in Zama before entering a gun shop in Shibuya and taking four hostages which resulted in a gunfight with police. A further 16 were injured before the attacker was subdued by a hostage and subsequently arrested. Parts of the shooting in Shibuya were caught on film.	
	August 1, 1966	Austin, Texas, United States	16 (Note: Including the perpetrator(s) or suspect(s))	31	49	News cameras	University of Texas tower shooting: A man murdered his wife and mother before entering his university where he killed three and wounded two inside. He then perched himself on top of the university and opened fire on the people below, killing a further twelve and injuring twenty-nine before being shot dead by police. The shooting on top of the tower was caught on live television by journalists recording on the ground.	
	April 27, 1979	San Antonio, Texas, United States	3	55	58	News cameras, bystander videos	1979 San Antonio parade shooting: 64-year-old Ira Attebury opened fire on crowds of spectators watching the Battle of Flowers parade, killing 2 people and injuring 55 others. Attebury killed himself after his rifle jammed during a 90 minute standoff with police.	
	December 8, 1987	Queen Street, Melbourne, Victoria, Australia	9	5	14	CCTV	Queen Street massacre: A man entered Australia Post offices and opened fire on people within the building, later committing suicide by jumping from the 11th floor. The shooter was spotted by the building's CCTV system.	
	February 28, 1997	North Hollywood, Los Angeles, California, United States	2	20	22	CCTV, Cameras on helicopters, news cameras	North Hollywood shootout: Two heavily armed bank robbers opened fire on LAPD units following a botched robbery of the North Hollywood branch of Bank of America, injuring 12 police officers and 8 civilians. One of the bank robbers committed suicide and the other one bled to death after being incapacitated by the police. A large portion of the 44-minute shootout was captured by cameras on police and news helicopters and also by news crews on the ground. Footage of the robbers firing at the police from the bank's ATM lobby was also captured on ATM security cameras.	
	March 11, 1997	Detroit, Michigan, United States	4	2	6	CCTV	1997 Detroit shootings: A man shot and killed three people with a shotgun, before being killed by police. The shooting spree was captured on at least one security camera.	
	April 20, 1999	Columbine, Colorado, United States	15	24	39	CCTV	Columbine High School massacre: Two students opened fire on their classmates and staff, killing 13 before committing suicide. Brief portions of the shooting were captured on the school's security camera system.	
	March 21, 2005	Red Lake, Minnesota, United States	10	5-9	15-19	CCTV	2005 Red Lake shootings: One former student kills 2 people at home before opening fire on their classmates and staff, killing 7 more before committing suicide. Some parts of the shooting were filmed on the school's security camera system and never released.	
	October 10, 2007	Cleveland, Ohio, United States	1	5	6	CCTV	2007 SuccessTech Academy shooting: A freshman opened fire on students and staff, injuring five before committing suicide. The shooting was captured on the school's internal security camera system.	
	December 5, 2007	Omaha, Nebraska, United States	9	5	14	CCTV	Westroads Mall shooting: A teenager opened fire at the Westroads Mall, killing eight people before shooting himself. The shooting was captured by surveillance cameras.	
	January 14, 2008	Kabul, Afghanistan	10	6	16	CCTV, other unknown camera	2008 Kabul Serena Hotel attack: Four terrorists entered a hotel throwing hand grenades, detonating car bombs and opening fire upon guests. In conclusion, two terrorists died detonating their suicide vests and another terrorist died after being shot by an armed hotel guard. Portions of the event were caught on CCTV and the subsequent search by the United States army was caught on film.	
	June 25, 2008	Henderson, Kentucky, United States	6	1	7	CCTV	2008 Atlantis Plastics shooting: An employee at a plastic factory fatally shot his supervisor before entering the break room and shooting several other co-workers. A surveillance camera in the break room captured the shooting.	
	March 11, 2009	Winnenden, Germany	16	9	25	Bystander camera	2009 Winnenden shootings: A former student killed 12 and wounded 7 at his former school, and proceeded to rampage through the city, killing 3 and wounding 2 more before dying in a police standoff. The shooter's final moments were filmed by a bystander.	
	May 20, 2010	West Memphis, Arkansas, United States	4	2	6	Police body camera (used by responding officers)	2010 West Memphis police shootings: Two men fatally wounded two police officers before being killed. The shooting was captured on body cameras worn by officers who were responding to the attack.	
	August 3, 2010	Manchester, Connecticut, United States	9	2	11	CCTV	Hartford Distributors shooting: A recently fired employee at an alcohol distribution warehouse shot 10 co-workers, killing eight, before he killed himself. Surveillance video captured parts of the shooting.	
	January 8, 2011	Tucson, Arizona, United States	6	15	21	CCTV	2011 Tucson shooting: A man attempted to assassinate politician Gabby Giffords, and fatally shot six people while carrying out the attack. Portions of the shooting were captured on the security cameras positioned outside of a nearby store, and the footage was never released to the public.	
	June 9, 2011	Medford, New York, United States	4	0	4	CCTV	2011 Medford pharmacy shooting: A man killed two employees and two customers at a pharmacy before stealing painkillers and pills and fleeing with his wife as the driver. The entire shooting was captured by surveillance video.	
	March 11–22, 2012	Montauban, France and Toulouse, France	8	11	19	CCTV and body-worn camera	Toulouse and Montauban shootings: A heavily armed Jihadist on a motorcycle shot several soldiers and targeted students and teachers at a Jewish school. In addition to being filmed by CCTV, the entire spree was filmed by the shooter, who wore a camera strapped to his chest, and later sent the footage to a Qatari news agency, who did not air the video.	
	August 24, 2012	New York City, New York, United States	2	9	11	CCTV	2012 Empire State Building shooting: A man shot and killed a former co-worker before being killed by police. The shooting was captured on a security camera located outside of the Empire State Building.	
	November 7, 2012	Moscow, Russia	6	1	7	CCTV	2012 Moscow shooting: A man armed with a semi-automatic shotgun entered a warehouse and shot at staff, killing six. Security cameras located in the building showed the attacker roaming the halls of the warehouse.	
	December 11, 2012	Clackamas, Oregon, United States	3	1	4	CCTV	Clackamas Town Center shooting: A man armed with a stolen AR-15-style rifle entered a shopping center and shot at storegoers, fatally wounding two before committing suicide. The entire shooting was documented on the shopping center's CCTV system.	
	September 21–24, 2013	Nairobi, Kenya	71	163	234	CCTV	Westgate shopping mall attack: Four Al-Shabaab militants, armed with assault rifles, opened fire on shoppers at a mall, resulting in the deaths of 71, including all of the attackers. The shooting was widely documented on security cameras, and footage of the attack was widely circulated.	
	September 16, 2013	Washington, D.C., United States	13	8	21	CCTV	Washington Navy Yard shooting: An employee opened fire on his fellow staff, murdering twelve and injuring eight others before being shot and killed by police. The attacker was captured driving into a garage shortly before the shooting, and the attack itself was documented on the building's security camera system.	
	January 25, 2014	Columbia, Maryland, United States	3	5	8	CCTV	2014 Columbia Mall shooting: A 19-year-old gunman opened fire at The Mall in Columbia killing two people and injuring five others before committing suicide.	
	May 23, 2014	Isla Vista, California	7 (Note: 3 by stabbing; 4 by gunfire, including the perpetrator)	14 (Note: 7 by gunfire, 7 struck by motor vehicle)	21	CCTV	2014 Isla Vista killings: A former college student fatally stabbed his two roommates and their friend before going on a shooting and vehicle ramming spree, killing three more people by gunfire before committing suicide by shooting himself in the head. CCTV footage caught the man shooting into a pizza restaurant and delicatessen as people ran for cover.	
	May 24, 2014	Brussels, Belgium	4	0	4	CCTV	Jewish Museum of Belgium shooting: A man shot and killed four people–two Israeli, one French, and one Belgian–at the Jewish Museum of Belgium. The gunman fled and was arrested six days later in Marseille, France. The Islamic State took responsibility for the attack. The gunman had attempted to film the shooting with a chest-mounted camera, but it failed to activate. Part of the shooting was seen on surveillance camera.	
	January 7, 2015	Paris, France	12	11	23	CCTV, Bystander video	Charlie Hebdo shooting: Two Islamic terrorists associated with Al-Qaeda in the Arabian Peninsula opened fire on staff at a newspaper building, fatally shooting 12. The attack was widely documented by security cameras located on the streets of Paris and by bystanders, who recorded the attack from balconies.	
	June 26, 2015	Sousse, Tunisia	39	39	78	CCTV, Bystander video	2015 Sousse attacks: A terrorist identified as Seifeddine Rezgui Yacoubi opened fire on people at a beach before entering a hotel and shooting tourists, killing 38 people, before he was killed by security forces.	
	August 26, 2015	Moneta, Virginia, United States	3	1	4	News cameras, perpetrator video	Murders of Alison Parker and Adam Ward: 41-year-old Vester Lee Flanagan II shot news reporters Allison Parker and Adam Ward while they were interviewing someone, killing them and injuring the person interviewed.	
	June 12, 2016	Orlando, Florida, United States	50	53	102	CCTV, Police body camera (used by responding officers)	Pulse nightclub shooting: An Islamic terrorist identified as Omar Mateen armed with a semi-automatic rifle and a pistol opened fire on partygoers, killing 49 before being shot and killed by police. The event was captured on the club's security cameras, and was also documented on the body cameras of police officers who responded to the shooting.	
	July 22, 2016	Olympia-Einkaufszentrum, Germany	10	36 (4 by gunshot)	46	Bystander video	2016 Munich shooting: An 18-year-old killed nine people and injured 36 at a mall in Munich before taking his own life.	
	September 23, 2016	Burlington, Washington, United States	5	0	5	CCTV	Cascade Mall shooting: A man walked into a shopping mall and then entered a clothing store, where he would fatally shoot five people at random. The shooter was captured roaming around the store on the mall's security camera system.	
	January 6, 2017	Fort Lauderdale, Florida, United States	5	42	47	CCTV	Fort Lauderdale airport shooting: A man murdered five people in a non-targeted shooting. The attack was documented on the airport's CCTV.	
	January 18, 2017	Monterrey, Mexico	2	3	5	CCTV	Colegio Americano del Noreste shooting: A high school student, armed with a handgun, shot four people, killing one, before committing suicide. A security camera located inside of the classroom where the shooting took place in captured the incident.	
	January 29, 2017	Quebec City, Quebec, Canada	6	19	25	CCTV	Quebec City mosque shooting: A man opened fire at a mosque, killing six and wounding several others. The shooting was captured by surveillance cameras inside the mosque.	
	February 17, 2017	Lima, Peru	6	9	15	CCTV	2017 Lima shooting: A man opened fire on shoppers at a shopping center, killing five and wounding nine others before being shot in the head by police. The attack was captured on the center's security camera system.	
	August 28, 2017	Clovis, New Mexico, United States	2	4	6	CCTV, Police body camera (used by responding officers)	Clovis library shooting: A 16-year-old male gunman ditched his plan to open fire at his former high school, angry over the fact that he had been suspended from the facility, and instead opened fire at a local library, shooting and killing 2 employees and injuring 4 others before surrendering to responding officers just before they arrived. The entire ordeal was caught on CCTV footage and police body cams.	
	October 1, 2017	Las Vegas, Nevada, United States	61	867	928	Bystander video, Police body camera, CCTV	2017 Las Vegas shooting: A gunman opened fire on a country music festival from the 32nd floor of the Mandalay Bay hotel, killing 60 and wounding several hundred. The shooting is the deadliest mass shooting by a lone gunman in American history.	
	November 5, 2017	Sutherland Springs, Texas, United States	27	22	49	Stationary camera at the back of the church	Sutherland Springs church shooting: A man armed with a rifle and two pistols opened fire on churchgoers during a service. He would later flee the scene and shoot himself after being wounded by a bystander. The events inside the church were captured by a camera set up at the back of the church that was meant to record services for uploading online.	
	December 31, 2017	Highlands Ranch, Colorado, United States	2	6	8	Livestream, police body camera	Copper Canyon Apartment Homes shooting: A 37-year-old man opened fire on sheriff's deputies responding to a call at an apartment, striking five officers, one of whom died, and two bystanders. The gunman filmed the stand-off on Periscope.	
	February 14, 2018	Parkland, Florida, United States	17	17	34	CCTV	Parkland High School shooting: An expelled student opened fire on students and staff at a high school in Florida, killing 17 before being arrested an hour later. The shooting was captured on the school's security camera system.	
	April 2, 2018	Nashville, Tennessee, United States	4	4	8	CCTV	Nashville Waffle House shooting: A 29-year-old man with schizophrenia shot several people at a Waffle House while naked from the waist down, killing four, before a customer wrestled the rifle out of his hands. CCTV footage captured the shooting both inside and outside the restaurant.	
	August 26, 2018	Jacksonville, Florida, United States	3	11	14	Webcam	Jacksonville Landing shooting: A man who was attending a gaming tournament opened fire on other players, killing two before committing suicide. A webcam was positioned at one of the victims, and the entirety of the shooting was captured on the webcam.	
	September 6, 2018	Cincinnati, Ohio, United States	4	2	6	Police body camera (used by responding officers)	2018 Cincinnati shooting: A man armed with a pistol shot people at random, before being killed. The shooting was captured on the body cameras of several responding officers.	
	October 17, 2018	Kerch, Crimea, Ukraine	21	67	88	CCTV, Bystander video	Kerch Polytechnic College massacre: A student armed with a nail bomb and shotgun shot at fellow students, resulting in the deaths of 21. The shooting and bombing were both documented on the college's security camera system, car video recorders, and students' phone cameras.	
	December 11, 2018	Campinas, São Paulo, Brazil	6	4	10	CCTV	Campinas Cathedral shooting: A 49-year-old man armed with two handguns opened fire on a group of worshippers at the Our Lady of the Conception Cathedral in Campinas, killing 5 and injuring 4 prior to commiting suicide. The shooting was fully captured on the cathedral's security camera system.	
	March 13, 2019	Suzano, São Paulo, Brazil	10	11	21	CCTV	Suzano Massacre: Two former students opened fire on their school with a revolver and attacked others with a hatchet as well, before killing themselves. Before the school attack they shot and killed the uncle of the youngest perpetrator. Most of the shooting was caught on camera.	
	March 15, 2019	Christchurch, New Zealand	51	89 (40 by gunshot)	140	Helmet camera, CCTV	Christchurch mosque shootings: A heavily armed man entered two separate mosques and opened fire on people inside, killing 51. The first shooting was captured on the shooter's helmet camera, which was live-streamed on Facebook before being taken down.	
	April 27, 2019	Poway, California, United States	1	3	4	CCTV	Poway synagogue shooting: A man armed with an AR-15-style rifle entered a synagogue and shot four people, one fatally. The attacker was captured on security cameras entering the synagogue before opening fire.	
	August 3, 2019	El Paso, Texas, United States	23	22	45	CCTV, Bystander video	2019 El Paso shooting: A domestic terrorist armed with a WASR-10 rifle shot at storegoers in a Walmart, killing 23. The attacker was captured entering the building on security cameras. Videos were also taken by people inside of the Walmart via cellular devices.	
	August 4, 2019	Dayton, Ohio, United States	10	27 (17 by gunshot)	37	CCTV	2019 Dayton shooting: A man fired 41 rounds into a crowd, killing nine people before being shot and killed by nearby police officers. CCTV footage captured the gunman as bystanders fled.	
	October 9, 2019	Halle, Germany	2	3	5	Helmet camera, CCTV	Halle synagogue shooting: A neo-Nazi attempted to shoot inside of a synagogue, but instead fatally shoots two people on a street and in an eatery. The attack was livestreamed via a helmet camera worn by the attack, and was also captured on Halle's CCTV cameras.	
	February 8–9, 2020	Nakhon Ratchasima province, Thailand	30	58	88	CCTV, Bystander video, body camera (perpetrator), livestream	Nakhon Ratchasima shootings: Over two days, a former Thai soldier carried out a series of shootings, resulting in the deaths of thirty people. The attacks were widely documented, being recorded on the city's CCTV camera system and by bystanders.	
	November 2, 2020	Vienna, Austria	5	23	28	CCTV, Bystander video	2020 Vienna attack: An Islamic terrorist shot at people in six different locations, killing four before being killed by police. Several of the shootings were captured on Vienna's security camera system. A bystander also took a video of the attacker shooting a sleeping man on a street.	
	February 9, 2021	Buffalo, Minnesota, United States	1	4	5	CCTV	Buffalo, Minnesota clinic attack: A man entered an Allina Health clinic and shot several employees, killing one and wounding four. He also set off several bombs, which did not injure anyone but caused significant damage to the building. Parts of the shooting were captured by surveillance cameras.	
	March 22, 2021	Boulder, Colorado, United States	10	2 (civilian not by gunfire)	12	CCTV, Bystander video	2021 Boulder shooting: 9 people were killed by gunfire when a gunman attacked a supermarket parking lot then interior before engaging in a fire fight with police, resulting in the death of an officer and the surrender of the suspect after being shot in the leg. A woman fractured her back while fleeing from the scene. Interior and exterior footage of the shooting was caught on video surveillance.	
	April 15, 2021	Indianapolis, Indiana, United States	9	7 (4 by gunshot)	16	CCTV	Indianapolis FedEx shooting: A self-described brony with a suspected interest in white supremacy and a definite interest in mass killers, drove to his former workplace and opened fire, killing 8 and injuring 4 by gunfire. The perpetrator exited and entered the establishment multiple times and did so a final time to turn the gun on himself. Indoor and outdoor surveillance footage caught the ordeal occurring.	
	May 11, 2021	Kazan, Tatarstan, Russia	9	23	32	CCTV	Kazan school shooting: A former student fatally shot 7 eighth-grade students and 2 teachers. The opening moments of the shooting were captured on the school's CCTV camera system.	
	May 30, 2021	Hialeah, Florida, United States	3	20	23	CCTV	2021 Hialeah shooting: Multiple gunmen opened fire on a crowd outside of a banquet hall during a rap concert, killing three people and injuring 20 others. CCTV captured the shooting.	
	August 12, 2021	Plymouth, England, United Kingdom	6	2	8	CCTV	Plymouth shooting: A fight broke out between a mother and her 22-year-old son which resulted in the son shooting and killing his mother. The gunman then exited his home and went on a shooting spree around his neighbourhood, killing a further 4 and injuring 2 before turning the gun on himself when confronted by an officer. Snippets of the shooting were caught on CCTV footage from houses in the neighbourhood.	
	September 20, 2021	Perm, Permsky District, Russia	6	48 (23 by gunshot)	54	CCTV, bystander video, dashcam	Perm State University shooting: A man opened fire on students and staff at a university in Perm, fatally shooting six. Portions of the shooting were captured on the university's CCTV system.	
	September 23, 2021	Collierville, Tennessee, United States	2	14	16	CCTV	Collierville Kroger shooting: A Kroger employee opened fire inside the store, killing a woman and injuring several others. CCTV cameras captured part of the shooting.	
	December 14, 2021	Tarragona, Spain	0	5	5	CCTV	A man opened fire inside his former workplace, a security guard firm, before fleeing, injuring a policeman during the process. The gunman then entered a shootout with police in which he would be critically injured. The shooting inside the workplace was caught on CCTV cameras.	
	December 26, 2021	Garland, Texas, United States	3	1	4	CCTV	2021 Garland shooting: A teenager opened fire on several people sitting down in a Texaco convenience store, killing three and seriously injuring one other. The entire shooting was filmed on the convenience store's extensive CCTV system, which ran inside and outside of the building.	
	27 January, 2022	Dnipro, Ukraine	5	5	10	CCTV	2022 Dnipro shooting: A soldier shot 10 people inside a factory, killing 4 soldiers and a civilian before being arrested after reporting himself to the police. Footage when the gunman first opened fire was caught on surveillance.	
	29 March, 2022	Bnei Brak, Israel	6	0	6	CCTV	2022 Bnei Brak shootings: A Palestinian terrorist attacked the city, killing 5 before being shot dead by police. Surveillance footage was caught outside a grocery where part of the attack occurred.	
	May 14, 2022	Buffalo, New York, United States	10	3	13	Helmet camera	2022 Buffalo shooting: A man entered a Tops supermarket with an AR-15-style rifle and opened fire on storegoers, killing ten. Portions of the shooting were livestreamed on Twitch via a helmet camera worn by the attacker, but the stream was taken down before the shooting ended.	
	May 24, 2022	Uvalde, Texas, United States	22	21	43	CCTV, Bystander video, Police body camera (used by responding officers)	Uvalde school shooting: A shooter, armed with an AR-15-style rifle and tactical gear, opened fire inside of two classrooms, killing 19 fourth graders and both teachers who taught the children. The opening moments of the shooting were captured on CCTV cameras located near the entrance, and a bystander filmed the shooter entering the school. The latter portions of the shooting were also captured on the body cameras of police who responded to the attack.	
	August 19, 2022	Malmö, Sweden	1	1	2	CCTV	2022 Emporia mall shooting: A 15-year-old boy opened fire in a mall and hit multiple people and killing a local gang leader.	
	August 28, 2022	Bend, Oregon, United States	3	2	5	CCTV	2022 Bend, Oregon shooting: A man opened fire upon his truck, a parking lot, and a grocery store, killing 2 and injuring 2 before turning the gun on himself. The events were caught on CCTV footage.	
	August 28, 2022	Phoenix, Arizona, United States	3	5	8	CCTV	2022 Phoenix shooting: A man shot at pedestrians in the parking lot of a Days Inn Motel in Phoenix. The entire event was captured on CCTV cameras in and outside of the building.	
	September 7, 2022	Memphis, Tennessee, United States	3	3	6	CCTV, Camera phone	2022 Memphis shootings: A man went on a shooting spree in Memphis, killing three. He livestreamed the attack via a cellular device on Facebook Live. Portions of the attack were also documented via street-positioned CCTV cameras.	
	October 12, 2022	Bristol, Connecticut, United States	3	1	4	Police body camera	Bristol, Connecticut police killings: A man ambushed and shot at police officers in Bristol, killing two and injuring one	
	October 12, 2022	Bratislava, Slovakia	3	1	4	CCTV	2022 Bratislava shooting: 19-year-old Juraj Krajčík opened fire outside Tepláreň, a gay bar in Bratislava. In a manifesto posted to his Twitter before the shooting he would mention the group Terrorgram which earned him the nickname in the Terrorgram community as "Terrorgrams first saint"	
120pxx90px	October 24, 2022	St. Louis, Missouri, United States	3	7	10	CCTV, Police body cam (used by responding officers)	2022 Central Visual and Performing Arts High School shooting: A 19-year-old graduate of the Central Visual and Performing Arts High School opened fire at the school, killing a student and teacher.	
	November 25, 2022	Aracruz, Brazil	4	12	16	CCTV	Aracruz school shootings: A teenager opened fire on two schools, killing four and injuring twelve others. Portions of the shooting were captured on CCTV cameras, including the shooter running into one of the schools.	
	November 19–20, 2022	Colorado Springs, Colorado, United States	5	26 (19 by gunshot)	31	CCTV	Colorado Springs nightclub shooting: A man, armed with an AR-15-style rifle and Glock 17 pistol, shot at patrons, murdering five. The moments leading up to and the initial moments of the shooting were captured on the club's CCTV camera system.	
	March 27, 2023	Nashville, Tennessee, United States	7	2 (1 by gunshot)	9	CCTV, Police body camera (used by responding officers)	2023 Nashville school shooting: A former student opened fire in an elementary school, killing three students and three teachers. The shooter was captured on CCTV cameras shooting through the school's glass doors and roaming the hallways. The shooter was killed by police, who captured the final minutes of the incident on their police-worn body cameras.	
	April 10, 2023	Louisville, Kentucky, United States	6	8	14	CCTV, Police body camera (used by responding officers), livestream	2023 Louisville bank shooting: A man who formerly worked at Louisville's Old National Bank branch opened fire on his former coworkers, killing five. Portions of the shooting were filmed by the bank's security cameras. Police who were responding to the shooting killed the perpetrator, which was captured on police-worn body cameras.	
	May 6, 2023	Allen, Texas, United States	9	7	16	Police body camera (used by responding officers), Bystander video, Dashcam	2023 Allen, Texas mall shooting: A man, armed with an AR-15-style rifle, shot at storegoers who were shopping at the Allen Premium Outlets strip. Police who were on-scene prior to the shooting captured the attack on their body cameras.	
	May 15, 2023	Farmington, New Mexico, United States	4	6	10	Police body camera, Doorbell camera	2023 Farmington, New Mexico shooting: A teenager fired at homes and passing drivers in his neighborhood, killing three women and injuring six people. The shooting was captured by a home's Ring camera and police body cameras.	
	June 23, 2023	Columbus, Ohio, United States	0	10	10	Police body camera (used by responding officers)	2023 Short North shooting: Multiple people shot at pedestrians, and 10 were injured as a result. The shooting was captured on the body cameras worn by officers who were already on-scene, dealing with another incident prior to the shooting.	
	August 26, 2023	Jacksonville, Florida, United States	4	0	4	CCTV	2023 Jacksonville shooting: A White supremacist shot and killed three people at a Dollar General store before killing himself. The shooting was captured by the store's surveillance camera.	
	October 7, 2023	Eshkol Regional Council, Israel	364	50+	414+	CCTV, Body cameras (worn by attackers and responding units), Dashcams	Nova music festival massacre: Several attackers opened fire on civilians at a music festival, killing 364 and wounding over fifty. The attack was widely documented on security cameras, dashcams, and body cameras. As of 2024, the attack remains the deadliest mass shooting ever captured on film.	
	October 16, 2023	Brussels, Belgium	3	1	4	Bystander video	2023 Brussels shooting: Just off the Square Sainctelette 45-year-old Abdesalem Lassoued opened fire on Swedes traveling to attend a football game in response for the 2023 Quran burnings in Sweden.	
	October 23, 2023	São Paulo, Brazil	1	3	4	CCTV	Sapopemba State School shooting: A student opened fire on classmates with a pistol, shooting one fatally in the head. Portions of the shooting were captured on the school's camera system.	
	October 25, 2023	Lewiston, Maine, United States	19	13	32	CCTV	2023 Lewiston shootings: A man opened fire on partygoers at a bowling alley and at Schemengees Bar & Grille in Lewiston, fatally shooting 18. The shooter was observed entering the bowling alley via CCTV cameras before opening fire, and may have also been captured shooting at partygoers.	
	December 21, 2023	Prague, Czech Republic	18	25	43	Bystander video	2023 Prague shootings: A postgraduate student, armed with several firearms, opened fire at the Faculty of Arts of the Charles University, killing 14 people and injuring 25 before taking his own life at the faculty's rooftop terrace. The perpetrator also murdered two people in Klánovice Forest six days prior and his father on the day of the shootings. The rooftop terrace shootings were recorded by a reporter named Jiří Forman.	
	January 4, 2024	Perry, Iowa, United States	3	6	9	CCTV, Livestream	Perry High School shooting: A student livestreamed a mass shooting at his high school in Perry, Iowa on social media. Two people were killed and five others were injured before the shooter committed suicide. The shooting was also captured by CCTV.	
	May 30, 2024	Minneapolis, Minnesota, United States	4	3	7	Police body camera	2024 Minneapolis shooting: A man shot three people at his apartment building before fatally shooting a responding police officer. In the following shoot-out, a second officer and a bystander were injured and the gunman was killed. The deceased officer's body camera captured the gunman firing at him, and other officer's bodycam's captured the shootout.	
	June 21, 2024	Fordyce, Arkansas, United States	4	10	14	CCTV, Bystander videos	2024 Fordyce shooting: A man armed with a 12-gauge shotgun and a 9mm pistol opened fire at civilians at the Mad Butcher supermarket in Fordyce, killing four people and injuring ten others, including the perpetrator.	
	September 2, 2024	Oak Park, Illinois, United States	4	0	4	CCTV	2024 Chicago train shooting: A person fatally shot four homeless people as they slept on a Chicago Transit Authority train. They then fled the scene but were later apprehended. The shooting was captured by surveillance cameras on the trains.	
	September 4, 2024	Winder, Georgia, United States	4	9	13	CCTV, cellphone recording	2024 Apalachee High School shooting: 14-year-old Colt Gray allegedly shot and killed 4 people, 2 students and 2 teachers, and injured 9. Gray was arrested shortly after. CCTV footage captures Colt entering into the building and approaching a classroom armed with a rifle. Cellphone footage also captured officers entering into classrooms.	
	October 1, 2024	Tel Aviv, Israel	9	17	24	CCTV	2024 Jaffa shooting: Two men armed with assault rifles entered a mosque and opened fire on civilians, killing seven. The attack was captured on security cameras.	
	October 23, 2024	Kahramankazan, Turkey	7	22	29	CCTV	2024 Turkish Aerospace Industries headquarters attack: Two men, armed with AKS-74U rifles and bombs, attacked an office building, killing five and injuring 22 others before being killed. The attack was captured on the building's security camera system.	
	November 1, 2024	Orlando, Florida, United States	2	8	10	CCTV, Police body camera	Orlando Halloween shooting: A 17-year-old shot 10 people during Halloween festivities in Downtown Orlando, killing two people and injuring eight others, including seven by gunshot. The suspect identified as Jaylen Dwayne Edgar was subdued and arrested by officers.	
	December 5, 2024	Lafayette, Indiana, United States	2	2	4	CCTV	2024 Lafayette, Indiana, laundromat shooting: A 73-year-old man entered a laundromat in Lafayette, Indiana, on December 5, 2024, and opened fire on customers, killing one person and injuring two others. After leaving the building, the gunman returned to his vehicle and died by suicide from a self-inflicted gunshot wound. Investigators later determined that the attack had been planned for years and was motivated by delusional beliefs involving the city of Lafayette.	
	January 5, 2025	Baghdad, Iraq	0	6	6	CCTV, Bystander video	Baghdad University shooting: A man opened fire at a university and shot six people with a pistol before being subdued by bystanders. Video footage was caught on CCTV and phone camera footage by bystanders.	
	February 4, 2025	Örebro, Sweden	11	6 (5 by gunshot)	17	Bystander videos, Police body camera	2025 Örebro school shooting: A man killed 10 people and wounded six others at an adult education centre. Parts of the shooting were captured on bystander video.	
	February 22, 2025	Shiloh, Pennsylvania, United States	2	7 (6 by gunshot)	9	CCTV, bystander videos	UPMC Memorial Hospital shooting: A man opened fire inside of the UPMC Memorial Hospital in Shiloh, York County, killing a police officer and injuring seven others before being fatally shot by police.	
	March 7, 2025	Toronto, Ontario, Canada	0	12 (7 by gunfire)	12	Security camera	2025 Toronto pub shooting: Three masked men opened fire injuring 12 people.	
	April 17, 2025	Tallahassee, Florida, United States	2	7	9	Bystander videos	2025 Florida State University shooting: A student at Florida State University began shooting at people near the student union, killing two men and injuring six people before being shot and arrested by police. Bystander videos captured parts of the shooting. One video, which showed the person filming walking by an injured victim with a Starbucks drink, sparked outrage online.	
	June 10, 2025	Graz, Styria, Austria	11	11	22	Bystander videos	Graz shooting: A 21-year-old attacked a school, killing 10 and wounding 11 others before committing suicide in the bathroom.	
	December 14, 2025	Bondi Beach, Sydney, New South Wales, Australia	16	43	59	Bystander videos	2025 Bondi Beach shooting: A father and son opened fire at a park during a Hanukkah event, killing fifteen people. One gunman was killed by police and the other was arrested. Videos showed parts of the shooting, including a bystander disarming one of the gunmen.	
	February 16, 2026	Pawtucket, Rhode Island, United States	4	2	6	Camera capturing hockey game	2026 Pawtucket shooting: A trans woman shot at her family members at a hockey rink during a game, killing two and injuring another three. The shooter killed herself. One of the injured victims succumbed to their injuries two weeks after the shooting. The sound of the incident was captured on a camera recording the game. Gunshots were audible in the background.	
	March 1, 2026	Austin, Texas, United States	4	15	19	Bystander videos, CCTV	2026 Austin bar shooting: A man opened fire inside and outside of a bar, killing two people and injuring 16 others before being fatally shot by police. One of the injured victims succumbed to their injuries a day after the shooting. Multiple bystanders and CCTV footage recorded the gunman opening fire on people.	
	April 14, 2026	Şanlıurfra, Turkey	1	16	17	Bystander footage, CCTV	2026 Siverek school shooting: A gunman opened fire at the Ahmet Koyuncu Vocational and Technical Anatolian High School injuring 16 people before getting cornered by police and taking his own life.	
	April 15, 2026	Maraş, Turkey	13	20	33	Bystander footage, CCTV	2026 Onikişubat school shooting: A gunman opened fire at the Ayser Çalık Secondary School killing 12 people and injuring 20 others before being stabbed in the leg by Necmettin Bekçi, a parent of two students, the gunman later died from blood loss caused by the stab wounds. It is the deadliest school shooting in Turkey.	
	April 18, 2026	Kyiv, Ukraine	8	14	22	Bystander footage, CCTV, audio recording	2026 Kyiv shooting: A gunman opened fire on Demiivska Street, then entered and continued firing at a supermarket. The shooter was killed by police in a shootout when the Rapid Operational Response Unit (KORD) stormed the building.	
	May 18, 2026	San Diego, California, United States	5	1	6	Livestream footage, dashcam	2026 Islamic Center of San Diego shooting: 2 teenagers opened fire at a mosque killing 3 people and injuring 1 in a drive-by shooting before taking their own lives.	
	June 6, 2026	Toledo, Ohio, United States	0	12	12	Bystander footage	2026 Old West End Festival shooting: Two rival gang members opened fire on each other at a festival, injuring 12 people, including one of the gunmen. Multiple bystander videos captured the shooting.	
	June 12, 2026	Midland, Texas, United States	2	10	12	Bystander footage	2026 Midland shooting: A gunman opened fire on vehicles and bystanders on Texas State Highway Loop 250, killing a man and injuring ten others, before barricading himself in an abandoned building and committing suicide. Bystander video captured the shootout between the gunman and police.	
A CCTV still of Chad Williams in the In-N-Out payment window before opening fire	August 1, 2026	Twin Falls, Idaho, United States	4	7	11	CCTV, bystander footage	2026 Twin Falls shooting: A man opened fire at an In-N-Out Burger restaurant, killing three people before taking his own life. Bystander video captured the shooter, as well as another man who fired at the gunman.	
	August 7, 2026	Bang Kruai district, Nonthaburi, Thailand	9	≈ 30		CCTV, bystander footage	2026 Nonthaburi shootings: A 14-year-old student opened fire at the Debsirin Nonthaburi School killing six people (including one that died of their injuries a day after) and injuring several others before taking his own life. Prior to the shooting, he had shot and killed his grandparents at their home in Bang Bua Thong district.	
	August 18, 2026	Zamboanga City, Philippines	2	2+		Livestream footage, bystander footage	2026 Zamboanga City school shooting: A Grade 9 student opened fire at the Ateneo de Zamboanga Junior High School killing one person and injuring at least two others before taking his own life.	
	September 22, 2026	Turgutlu, Manisa Province, Turkey	0	11	11	CCTV	2026 Turgutlu school shooting: A 15-year-old boy opened fire on students near a school. Eleven juveniles were shot and wounded in the shooting.	
	November 7, 2026	Kraków, Poland	6	15	21	CCTV, bystander footage	2026 Kraków shooting: A gunman opened fire on people in Kraków's Main Market Square. Six people were killed and fifteen others were injured.	

== See also ==
- Livestreamed crime
