= Orlando shooting =

Orlando shooting may refer to:

- Murder of Christina Grimmie, the fatal shooting of an American singer at the Plaza Live in Orlando, Florida, on June 10, 2016
- Pulse nightclub shooting, a 2016 shooting and terrorist attack inside Pulse, a gay nightclub in Orlando, Florida, which killed 49 people and injured 58 others
- Orlando factory shooting, a 2017 workplace shooting at Fiamma, a factory in Florida, which killed five people
- Orlando Halloween shooting, a 2024 shooting that killed two people and injured seven others.

== See also ==
- Killing of Dylan Lyons, the fatal shooting of an American television news reporter in Pine Hills, west of Orlando, Florida, on February 22, 2023
- List of shootings in Florida
