= List of shootings in Florida =

This is a list of homicides committed by firearms in the state of Florida which have a Wikipedia article for the killing, the killer, or a related subject.

Article	Location	Date	Number killed	Number injured	Description
Jim Jumper massacre	St. Lucie County	February 14 or 15, 1889	7+	1	Killing of Seminoles
Rosewood massacre	Levy County	January 1923	8+	Unknown	Racially motivated massacre of black people and the destruction of a black town
Carol City murders	Carol City	July 27, 1977	6	2	Mass shooting at a drug house
Murder of Frances Slater	Stuart	April 27, 1982	1	0	Kidnapping and murder of a business magnate's granddaughter
Bob Moore's Welding & Machine Service Inc. massacre	Hialeah	August 20, 1982	8	3	The worst mass shooting in Florida at the time.
1986 FBI Miami shootout	Dade County	April 11, 1986	4	5	Shootout between robbers and FBI agents
Murder of Richard Raczkoski	Vero Beach, Florida	September 23, 1986	1	0	The first Indian River County police officer to be murdered in the line of duty.
1987 Palm Bay shooting	Palm Bay	April 23, 1987	6	14	Mass shooting
Murder of Fred Griffis	West Palm Beach, Florida	June 24, 1987	1	0	Murder of a corrections officer
James Edward Pough	Jacksonville	June 17–18, 1990	11	6	Shooting spree
Murder of Danny Parrish	Fort Pierce, Florida	January 18, 1991	1	0	Shooting and murder of a Fort Pierce police officer
Kissimmee carjacking murders	Kissimmee, Florida	November 29, 1992	2	1	Carjacking and murders of two men. A third man and a woman was also carjacked but survived.
Murders of Greg and Kimberly Malnory	Charlotte County	April 6, 1997	2	1	Robbery and murder of a couple in a fish farm
murder of Kazue Perron	West Palm Beach, Florida	November 14, 1997	1	0	Carjacking and murder of a Japanese woman
murder of Jennifer Robinson	Santa Rosa County, Florida	May 7, 1998	1	0	Murder of a 18-year-old girl
1998 Crestview family murders	Crestview, Florida	September 11, 1998	4	0	Mass shooting
2003 Mayport murders	Mayport	May 14–23, 2003	5	0	Mass murder
Killing of Rigoberto Alpizar	Miami-Dade County	December 7, 2005	1	0	Fatal shooting of unarmed man by Federal Air Marshals
2006 Ocala National Forest murders	Ocala National Forest	January 4, 2006	2	0	Robbery and double murder of campers at the Ocala National Forest
2009 Thanksgiving murders	Jupiter, Florida	November 26, 2009	4	1	Mass shooting
Murders of Stephen Adams and Kevin Powell	Wilton Manors, Florida	December 23, 2010	2	0	Murders of a homosexual couple by Peter Avsenew.
murder of Seath Jackson	Summerfield, Florida	April 17, 2011	1	0	Murder and dismemberment of a 15-year-old boy
Killing of Trayvon Martin	Sanford	February 26, 2012	1	0	Fatal shooting of unarmed African-American boy
Murder of Jordan Davis	Jacksonville	November 23, 2012	1	0	Fatal shooting of unarmed African-American boy
2013 Hialeah shooting	Hialeah	July 26–27, 2013	7	0	Mass shooting
2014 shooting	Florida State University	November 19–20, 2014	0	3	School shooting
Murder of Christina Grimmie	Orlando	June 10, 2016	2	0	Murder-suicide
Pulse nightclub shooting	Orlando	June 12, 2016	49	58	Terrorist attack/mass shooting; deadliest U.S. mass shooting at the time
Fort Lauderdale airport shooting	Broward County	January 6, 2017	5	42	Mass shooting
Orlando factory shooting	Orlando	June 5, 2017	6	0	Workplace shooting
Parkland high school shooting	Parkland	February 14, 2018	17	17	School shooting
Murder of XXXTentacion	Deerfield Beach, Florida	June 18, 2018	1	0	Robbery and murder of a singer-songwriter and rapper
Jacksonville Landing shooting	Jacksonville	August 26, 2018	3	11	Mass shooting
2018 Tallahassee shooting	Tallahassee	November 2, 2018	3	5	Mass shooting
2019 Sebring shooting	Sebring	January 23, 2019	5	0	Mass shooting
2019 Miramar shootout	Miramar	December 5, 2019	4	1	Shootout between robbers/carjackers and police
Naval Air Station Pensacola shooting	Pensacola	December 6, 2019	4	8	Terrorist attack/mass shooting
2021 Sunrise, Florida shootout	Sunrise	February 2, 2021	3	3	Shootout between suspected pedophile and FBI agents
2021 Hialeah shooting	Hialeah	May 30, 2021	3	20	Gang-related violence
Murder of Joshua Moyers	Nassau County, Florida	September 23, 2021	1	0	Murder of a Nassau County Sheriff's Deputy in 2021
2023 Jacksonville shooting	Jacksonville, Florida	August 26, 2023	4	0	Racially motivated hate crime
Murder of Julio Foolio	Tampa, Florida	June 23, 2024	1	3	Mass shooting and gang-motivated murder of a rapper
2024 Orlando Halloween shooting	Orlando	November 1, 2024	2	8	Mass shooting
2025 Florida State University shooting	Tallahassee	April 17, 2025	2	7	School shooting
2026 Fort Lauderdale–Sarasota shootings	Fort Lauderdale and Bee Ridge	February 10, 2026	7	0	Spree shooting
