= 2022 shooting of police officers in Bristol, Connecticut =

Shooting of police officers in Connecticut, US

- Location: 41.6577°N 72.9037°W; Bristol, Connecticut, US
- Date: October 12, 2022
- Target: Police officers
- Attack type: Ambush, mass shooting
- Weapons: Stag Arms AR-15-style semi-automatic rifle; 9mm Glock 17 semi-automatic pistol
- Deaths: 3 (including the perpetrator)
- Injuries: 2
- Perpetrator: Nicholas Brutcher

On October 12, 2022, two police officers of the Bristol Police Department were shot and killed while responding to a domestic dispute in Bristol, Connecticut, United States. Nicholas Brutcher made a fake 9-1-1 call requesting the police and ambushed the three responding officers, Sergeant Dustin DeMonte, Officer Alex Hamzy, and Officer Alec Iurato, with a semi-automatic rifle. Brutcher killed Hamzy and fatally wounded DeMonte before he was then shot and killed by a wounded Iurato. DeMonte and Hamzy were posthumously promoted.

== Background ==
On the evening of October 12, 2022, 35-year-old Nicholas Brutcher and his younger brother Nathan went to a bar in Bristol, Connecticut, where the former intended to perform stand-up comedy at an open mic night. At around 8:30 p.m., Nicholas got into a fight with another man, which spilled out into the bar's parking lot and resulted in the police being called. Officer Harrison Pollock of the Bristol Police Department arrived at the bar at 8:52 p.m., where witnesses pointed out the Brutcher brothers were driving away in a white truck, and pulled them over nearby. Nathan, who was driving the truck, was found to have a suspended driver's license and Pollock had the truck towed. Both men appeared drunk, were highly agitated, and were making rude remarks to officers who had arrived on scene, to the point they both were ticketed for creating a public disturbance. Due to their truck having been towed, their mother was called to pick them up, but Nicholas refused and insisted on walking home. The officers told him he could not walk home for safety reasons and, due to his continued resistance, their mother decided to take Nathan home and return to collect him. Nicholas eventually went home with his mother and the incident appeared to have ended.

== Ambush ==
At 10:32 p.m., Nicholas placed a 9-1-1 call, claiming that his brother was agitated, pushing him, and that he would like assistance from the police. Three officers: Sergeant Dustin DeMonte, Officer Alex Hamzy, and Officer Alec Iurato arrived at the residence on Redstone Hill Road. All three officers went to the side door of the house to speak to Nathan, who was ordered to step outside of the house with his hands up. Nicholas, wearing body armor, camouflage and armed with an AR-15, opened fire from the yard of the neighboring house behind the officers.

DeMonte and Hamzy collapsed on the driveway while Iurato, shot in his leg, was able to retreat around the house. Nicholas Brutcher allegedly walked up to the fallen officers and proceeded to shoot the downed officers with the AR-15, but it jammed because he had inserted the magazine upside down and instead shot them with a Glock 17 handgun. Iurato propped himself up on a police cruiser and returned fire, striking and killing Nicholas with one shot from his service pistol. Hamzy was killed, and DeMonte was fatally wounded and transported to the hospital, where he later died. Nathan Brutcher was also struck with bullets fired by his brother (either intentionally or due to ricocheting) but survived. Approximately 80 shots were fired during the incident.

== Aftermath ==
=== Tributes to the officers ===
In 11 days, over $1 million was raised in support of the fallen officers and their families. As of the end of October, more than 100 people came to pay their respects to the fallen officers at the memorial for them, outside of the Bristol Police Department headquarters. DeMonte and Hamzy became the 149th and 150th names memorialized at the Connecticut Police Academy in Meriden.

During a Miami Dolphins game, the team honored DeMonte, who had been a life-long Dolphins fan. Along with the Dolphins, the New England Patriots also paid tribute to DeMonte and Hamzy on Twitter.

=== Funeral services ===
On October 21, 2022, in East Hartford, close to 10,000 law enforcement officers and supporters from all across the United States and even as far as Canada came to attend the funeral service for the fallen officers.

During the funeral service, Sergeant DeMonte and Officer Hamzy were posthumously promoted to lieutenant and sergeant, respectively. DeMonte served ten years of service and Hamzy served eight years of service for the Bristol Police Department. Connecticut Governor Ned Lamont attended the funeral. "Lt. DeMonte and Sgt. Hamzy are heroes and served with integrity and courage. We will forever keep them and their families in our hearts", Lamont said during his speech. The funeral service ended with a helicopter flyover and bagpipers playing "Amazing Grace".

== See also ==
- List of American police officers killed in the line of duty
- List of filmed mass shootings
