= 2021 Garland shooting =

Mass shooting in Texas, U.S.

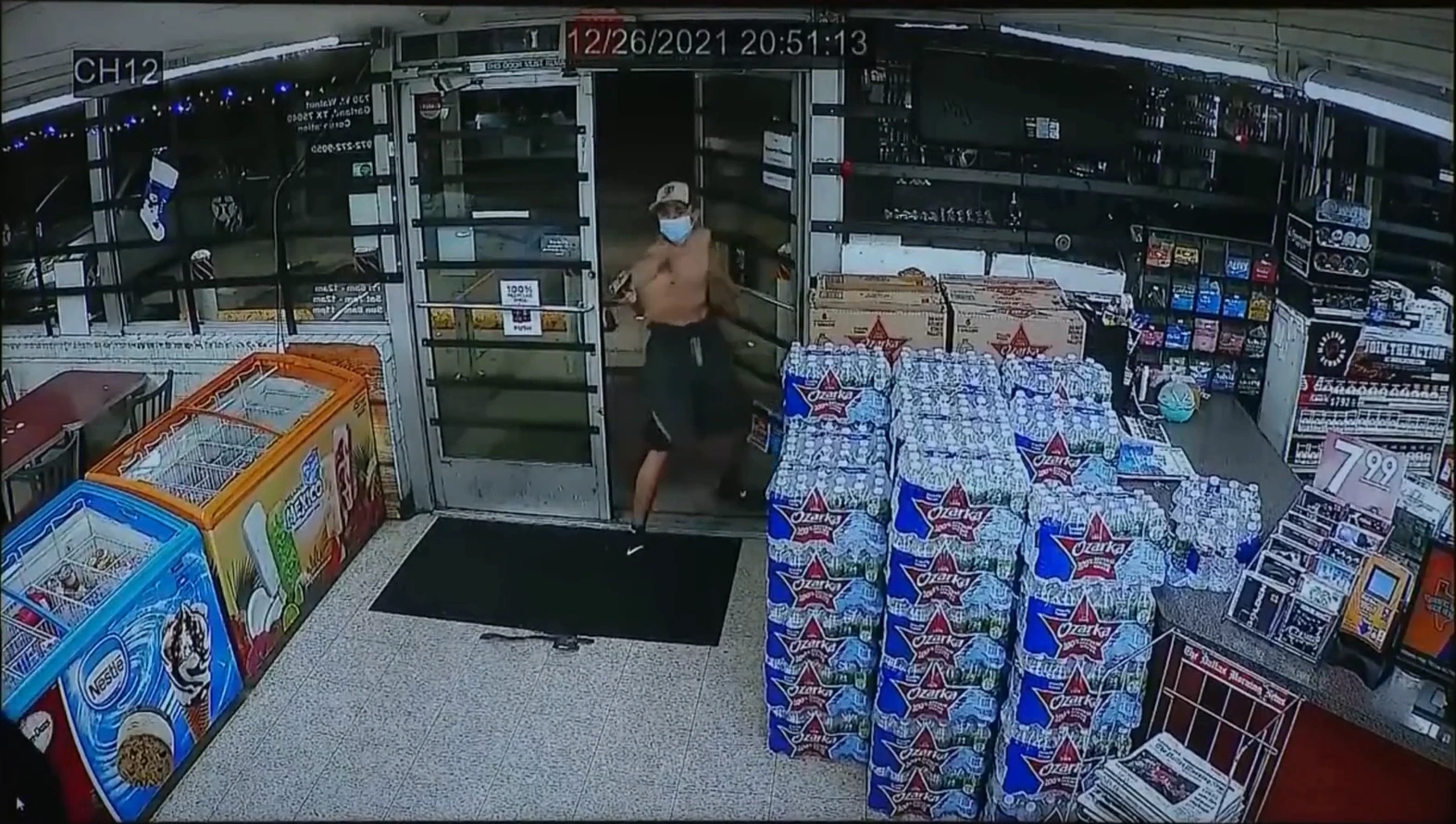
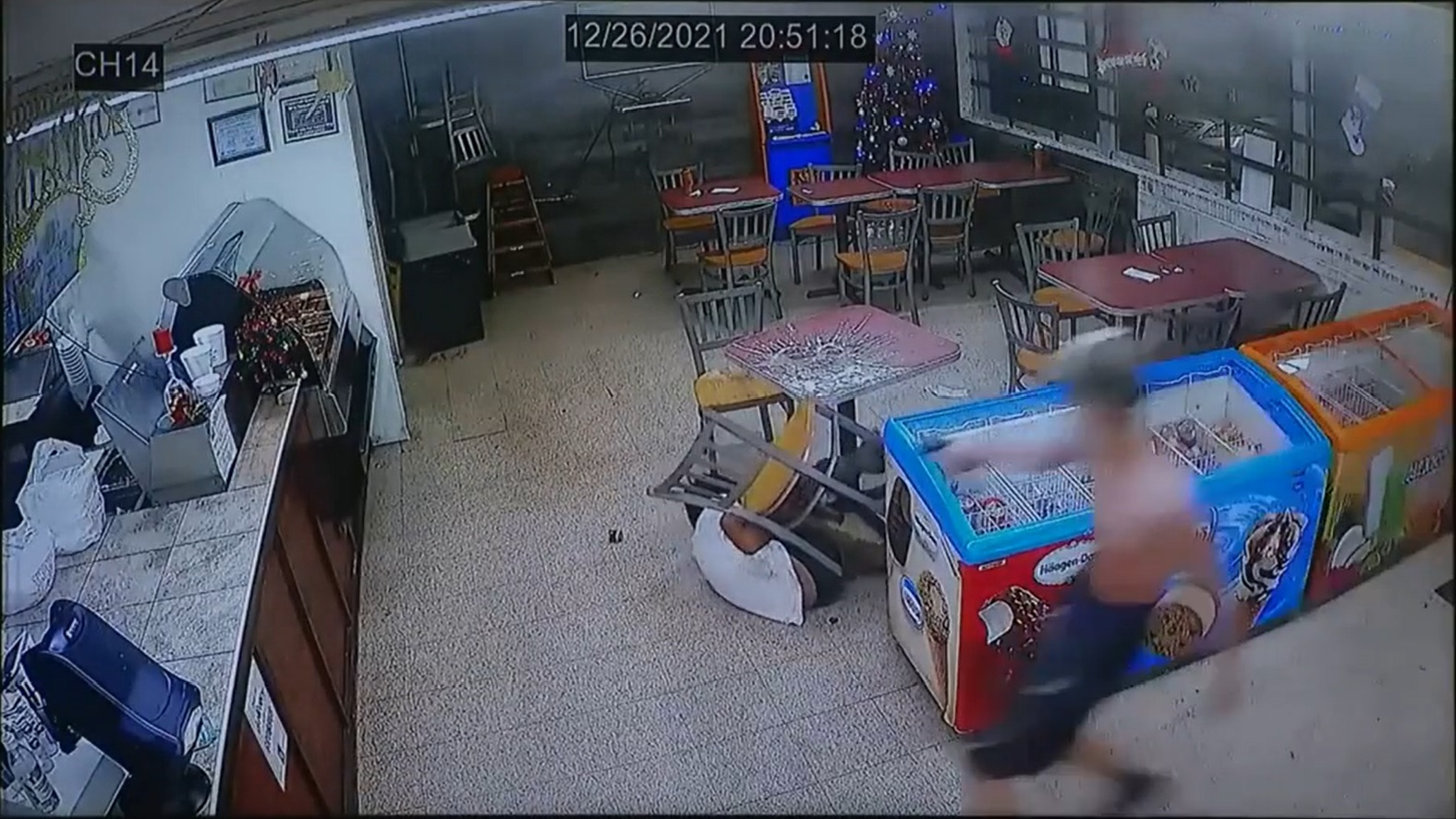
- Top: Acosta, seen firing into the store. Four people were injured by the initial gunfire. Bottom: Acosta inside of the store, firing at random. Xavier Gonzalez, who would die in the shooting, can be seen hiding under a chair.
- Location: 32.9157°N 96.6397°W; 730 W Walnut St, Garland, Texas, US
- Date: December 26, 2021; 8:51:13 PM (CDT)
- Attack type: Mass shooting
- Weapon: .40-caliber semi-automatic pistol
- Deaths: 3
- Injuries: 1
- Perpetrator: Abel Elias Acosta
- Convicted: Richard Acosta Jr.

On December 26, 2021, a mass shooting took place at a Texaco convenience store in Garland, Texas, United States. Three teenage boys were killed and another was seriously injured before the alleged perpetrator, 14-year-old Abel Acosta, fled the scene. As of 2026, Abel is wanted for the shooting and believed to be hiding in Mexico.

== Shooting ==
At 8:50 PM CDT, a white truck with two occupants pulled up to a Texaco-owned convenience store in Garland. Abel exited the passenger side of the vehicle, and walked behind the truck, positioning himself on one of the exterior walls of the store. He then walked up to the front door, and stopped before ducking under a window. Seconds later, Abel got up, opened the entrance door and reached inside of the building, before firing 20 rounds from a .40-caliber pistol with an extended magazine.

The first person shot was Xavier Gonzalez, who was shot multiple times by Abel; he was seriously injured. Abel then stepped inside of the store, where he stood above Gonzalez and shot him in the shoulder/back multiple times, significantly injuring him. Abel then shot at Ivan Noyola and Rafael Garcia, both of whom had already been injured when Abel first opened fire inside of the store. As Noyola and Garcia attempted to flee, they were shot in the back and were fatally wounded. After firing several shots at them, Abel shot at another teenager, David Rodriguez, who was employed with the store, injuring him in the chest. Abel then ran back to the white truck, and the vehicle sped off.

Xavier Gonzalez was shot 10 times, Ivan Noyola was shot 4 times, and Rafael Garcia was shot 2 times, including once in the heart.

=== Victims ===
The three fatal victims of the shooting were between the ages of 14 and 17. The youngest, Xavier Gonzalez, was believed to have been uninvolved with Abel prior to the shooting. The injured victim was a cook at the gas station.

=== Perpetrator ===
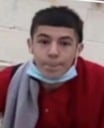
Undated photo of Abel Acosta

Abel Acosta was 14 years old at the time of the shooting. The reason he carried out the shooting is disputed, but it is believed to have been because of prior conflict between him and Ivan Noyola, who would die in the shooting.

== Investigation ==
After the attack, Abel fled from authorities and is believed to be in Mexico. On December 27, police arrested a different 14-year-old boy as a suspect before releasing him after questioning by December 29. The driver of the white truck, identified as Abel's father Richard Acosta Jr., turned himself in the day after the shooting and was arrested for facilitating the attack and acting as a getaway driver.

Abel Acosta is wanted on a federal warrant for unlawful flight to avoid prosecution. People who committed crimes while under 18 years old are, as per a U.S. Supreme Court judgment, ineligible for the death penalty. People who commit capital crimes while 14–16 years old and while sentenced as adults, under Texas law, have a maximum sentence of life with parole. Under Texas law, people who commit capital murder while being a 17-year-old have the maximum sentence of life without parole; people who commit crimes at age 17 are treated as adults under Texas law.

=== Trial ===
In February 2022, Richard Acosta Jr. was indicted by the Dallas County court on a capital murder charge, which can carry the death sentence in the state of Texas. The attorney of Abel's father stated that Abel Acosta was involved in gang activity, which his family was unaware of, and that Abel had told his father that he was going to confront one of the victims, Ivan Noyola, over a stolen necklace at the gas station, though his son denied personally knowing him. Richard Acosta Jr. claimed that he was unaware that his son was armed and that after driving home, Abel left without his knowledge. The prosecution alleged that he had aided Abel Acosta in his escape from the country afterwards.

In February 10, 2023, the father, Richard Acosta Jr., was found guilty on 3 counts of capital murder and sentenced to Life Without Parole (LWOP).

== Later developments ==
A sister of victim Rafael Garcia told authorities that the day after the shooting, an unknown Instagram account had sent her messages about her brother's death, claiming affiliation with a gang. The account owner, a male juvenile, was identified and signed an affidavit attesting that he found out the names of the victims immediately after the shooting through a group chat, which police could not confirm.

Garland Crime Stoppers offered $20,000 for information leading to Abel Acosta's arrest.

On February 3, 2026, the 5th District Court of Appeals in Dallas affirmed the trial court's judgment and upheld the father's conviction.

In April 2026, the Federal Bureau of Investigation announced an increase to the official reward for Abel's capture to $50,000, making the total reward amount to $70,000.

== See also ==
- List of mass shootings in the United States in 2021
- List of filmed mass shootings
- List of fugitives from justice who disappeared
