= Cheryl Thomas =

American dance educator (born 1957)

- Born: Cheryl Thomas; 1957 (age 68–69); Richmond, Virginia, U. S.
- Education: Florida State University; Gallaudet University
- Occupations: Dancer teacher; Educator; Advocator; Human rights activist
- Years active: 2009 – present
- Children: 2

Cheryl Thomas (born 1957) is an American dance educator and activist known as a survivor of the serial killer Ted Bundy. On January 15, 1978, she was brutally assaulted in her Tallahassee apartment, an event that took place on the same night as Bundy's attacks at Florida State University. Despite sustaining life-altering injuries that ended her performance career, she became a prominent advocate for survivors and later specialized in teaching dance to the deaf community.

== Early life and education ==
Cheryl Thomas was born into a military family in Richmond, Virginia. Her father served in the United States Army throughout her childhood, leading the family to relocate frequently across various states. Thomas has described herself as an "army brat," noting that her upbringing was characterized by a sense of duty and discipline.

By 1978, she was a 21-year-old senior at Florida State University (FSU). She was a highly active student and a member of the FSU dance team, pursuing a career as a professional ballet dancer.

== 1978 attack ==
On January 14, 1978, Thomas spent the evening dancing with friends at a local Tallahassee disco. She returned to her off-campus basement apartment on Dunwoody Street shortly after midnight.

At approximately 4:00 AM, Ted Bundy, who had just fled the Chi Omega sorority house after he had murdered Margaret Bowman and Lisa Levy, entered Thomas's home through a kitchen window. He attacked her while she slept, using a piece of wood as a bludgeon. The assault was so violent that neighbors as well her friends Debbie Ciccarelli and Nancy Young heard the sounds of the attack through the walls. When Thomas failed to answer her phone, her neighbor, Debbie Ciccarelli, contacted the police. Officers found Thomas unconscious and severely beaten; a pair of knotted pantyhose, which Bundy had used as a mask, was recovered at the scene.

=== Recovery and career shift ===
Thomas suffered five skull fractures, a broken jaw, and a dislocated shoulder. She remained in a coma for several days following the attack. A severed eighth cranial nerve resulted in permanent deafness in her left ear and a permanent loss of equilibrium (balance).

Because balance is fundamental to professional dance, the injuries forced her to abandon her dream of performing on stage. However, she remained determined to stay in the field. After a period of recovery in Texas, she eventually returned to university to finish her degree. She pivoted her career toward dance education and later specialized in teaching ballet to hearing-impaired students, using her own experience with deafness to connect with her pupils.

=== Legal proceedings ===
Thomas testified at Bundy's 1979 Chi Omega murder trial in Miami. Although she had no memory of the attack and could not identify Bundy as her assailant, her testimony provided physical evidence and established the timeline of his rampage.

== Personal life ==
Thomas has largely kept her private life out of the public eye, though she has occasionally shared personal reflections on her survival. Following the attack, she moved to Texas to be closer to family support. She has spoken about the immense role her mother, Anne Thomas, played in her recovery, with Anne famously telling the Associated Press in 1989 that she "thanked God every day" for her daughter's life.

Thomas is married and resides in the Southern United States. She has two children including one daughter, whom she has described as a central part of her life and motivation for moving forward.

== Advocacy ==
Thomas has noted that her role as a mother and her successful career in education are her greatest triumphs over the trauma she endured. She remains an active advocate for campus safety and frequently emphasizes the importance of resilience for other survivors of violent crime.

== Public appearances ==
In recent decades, Thomas has appeared in major media specials to provide a voice for Bundy's victims, including The 40-Year Hunt for Ted Bundy, Live to Tell: Surviving Ted Bundy and You Matter (NYU Podcast) a discussion on campus safety and resilience.

== See also ==
- Ted Bundy

== General and cited sources ==
- Rule, Ann (1980). The Stranger Beside Me (First ed.). New York and London: W. W. Norton & Company. ISBN 0-393-01399-5.
- Rule, Ann (1989). The Stranger Beside Me (Paperback; revised and updated ed.). New York City: Signet Books. ISBN 978-0-451-16493-3.
- Rule, Ann (2000). The Stranger Beside Me (Paperback; updated 20th anniversary ed.). New York: Signet Books. ISBN 978-0-451-20326-7.
- Rule, Ann (2009). The Stranger Beside Me (Paperback; updated 2009 ed.). New York City: Pocket Books. ISBN 978-1-4165-5959-7.
