= Florida State University Chi Omega murders =

1978 murders committed by Ted Bundy

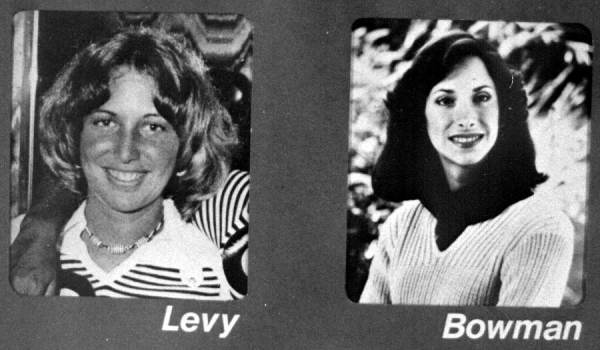
- Lisa Levy and Margaret Bowman, the two victims murdered in the attack
- Location: Tallahassee, Florida, U.S.
- Date: January 15, 1978; 48 years ago
- Target: Women at the Florida State University Chi Omega sorority house
- Attack type: Double murder; Attempted mass murder; Sexual assault; Burglary
- Weapon: Wooden log
- Deaths: 2
- Injuries: 3
- Perpetrator: Ted Bundy
- Convictions: First-degree murder (2 counts)
- Sentence: Death

In the early hours of January 15, 1978, serial killer Ted Bundy assaulted four women at the Florida State University Chi Omega sorority house using a wooden log; killing 21-year old Margaret Bowman and 20-year old Lisa Levy, and injuring 21-year-old Kathy Kleiner and 21-year-old Karen Chandler. Bundy then broke into a home on Dunwoody Street and attacked FSU dance major Cheryl Thomas eight blocks away from the Chi Omega house, who survived.

Bundy had escaped from jail in Colorado on December 30, 1977, two weeks prior. The FSU murders would be, along with the murder of 12-year-old Kimberly Leach, the only murders Bundy was convicted of, though he is confirmed to have murdered at least 20 and later confessed to murdering at least 30 women and girls. Bundy was sentenced to death for the FSU murders in July 1979.

== See also ==
- 2022 University of Idaho murders
- 2025 Florida State University shooting

== General and cited sources ==
- Sullivan, Kevin M. (2009). The Bundy Murders: A Comprehensive History (Paperback ed.). Jefferson, North Carolina: McFarland and Co. ISBN 978-0-7864-4426-7.
- Dekle, George R. Sr. (2011). The Last Murder: The Investigation, Prosecution, and Execution of Ted Bundy (Hardcover ed.). Santa Barbara, California: Praeger (Imprint of ABC-CLIO). ISBN 978-0-313-39743-1.
- Rule, Ann (2009). The Stranger Beside Me (Paperback; updated 2009 ed.). New York City: Pocket Books. ISBN 978-1-4165-5959-7.
