= 2025 Florida State University shooting =

Mass shooting in Florida, U.S.

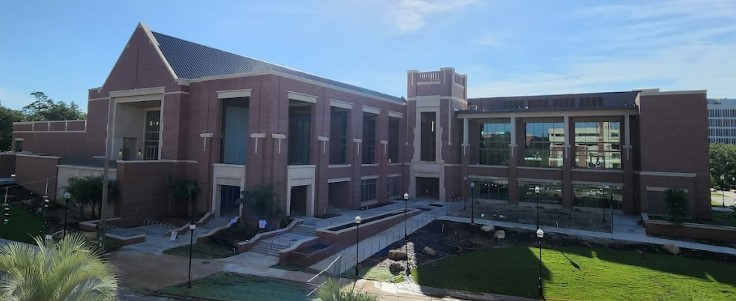
- The Student Union building, where most of the shooting occurred
- Location: 30.444803°N 84.297397°W; Florida State University, Student Union Building, Tallahassee, Florida, U.S.
- Date: April 17, 2025; 18 months ago 11:57 a.m. – 12:00 p.m. (EDT, UTC-04:00)
- Target: Students and staff at Florida State University
- Attack type: Mass shooting; school shooting
- Weapons: .45-caliber Glock 21 semi-automatic pistol; 12-gauge shotgun (unused)
- Deaths: 2
- Injuries: 7 (6 by gunfire, including the accused)
- Motive: Under investigation
- Accused: Phoenix Ikner

On April 17, 2025, a mass shooting occurred on the campus of Florida State University (FSU) in Tallahassee, Florida, United States. Two university employees were killed and six others wounded in an attack lasting approximately three minutes near and inside the Student Union building, just before noon. The two people killed were Robert Morales, 57, the campus dining director, and Tiru Chabba, 45, a regional vice president at Aramark Collegiate Hospitality. Phoenix Ikner, a 20-year-old FSU student, was shot in the jaw by campus police and taken into custody. A Glock 21 handgun belonging to his stepmother, a Leon County Sheriff's deputy, was used in the attack; a shotgun also found at the scene had not been fired.

Ikner, born Christian Gunnar Eriksen, was a dual American-Norwegian citizen who had experienced a turbulent childhood marked by a bitter parental custody dispute that included an international abduction by his biological mother. He later espoused white supremacist and far-right views and was removed from a political group at Tallahassee State College. Court documents later revealed that Ikner had used ChatGPT extensively in the hours before the attack, asking the chatbot questions about likely media coverage of a mass shooting and about the busiest times at the Student Union.

After spending a month hospitalized, Ikner was charged with two counts of first-degree murder and seven counts of attempted first-degree murder. He was indicted by a grand jury on May 14, 2025, and denied bond. Florida prosecutors announced in June 2025 that they would seek the death penalty. The trial, initially scheduled for October 2026, was later postponed to June 8, 2027.

The shooting prompted an outpouring of reaction from politicians, activists, and survivors of previous mass shootings, including the Parkland shooting. Civil lawsuits followed on behalf of the victims' families, including a planned suit against OpenAI over ChatGPT's alleged role in facilitating the attack. The Florida Attorney General launched a separate criminal investigation into OpenAI's potential liability.

== Background ==
Florida State University is a public research university in Tallahassee, Florida. It maintains 17 colleges as well as 58 centers, facilities, labs, institutes, and professional training programs. In 2023, the university enrolled 43,701 students from all 50 states and 135 countries.

Three acts of mass violence targeting the university or its students had occurred before the 2025 shooting. On January 15, 1978, serial killer Ted Bundy murdered two women at the school's Chi Omega sorority house and injured two others, before attacking another FSU student at a house eight blocks away. A previous shooting occurred in November 2014, when a gunman opened fire in the university's library around midnight, wounding three people before being killed by responding law enforcement. In 2018 a gunman attacked a Tallahassee yoga studio, shooting six people, resulting in the deaths of two women including an FSU student.

== Shooting ==
The suspect arrived at a Florida State University parking garage at approximately 11:00 a.m. and remained there until 11:51 a.m., spending most of that time in his car and occasionally stepping outside. After leaving the parking garage, he drove to a service road beside the Student Union and parked at 11:57 a.m. He got out, aimed a shotgun at a student, but the weapon failed to fire. He returned the shotgun to his vehicle, retrieved his stepmother's Glock handgun, and at 11:57:22 a.m. was captured on CCTV running toward the union with the handgun concealed in his right pocket.

At 11:57:24 a.m., the suspect aimed his handgun and fired the first shots outside the Student Union, wounding two students on the lawn while firing at several others. Video shows him in shorts and a T-shirt walking and firing across the lawn. He then ran to the Student Union and entered the building at 11:58:22 a.m., chasing people through the corridors. At 11:58:36 a.m., he chased campus vendor Tiru Chabba outside the building and shot him, then ran west. At 11:58:51 a.m., he returned and shot Chabba again. At 11:58:54 a.m., he ran toward the union's bookstore, firing at a group of students outside and hitting three of them non-fatally. He then returned to the bookstore entrance and fired at another student, missing.

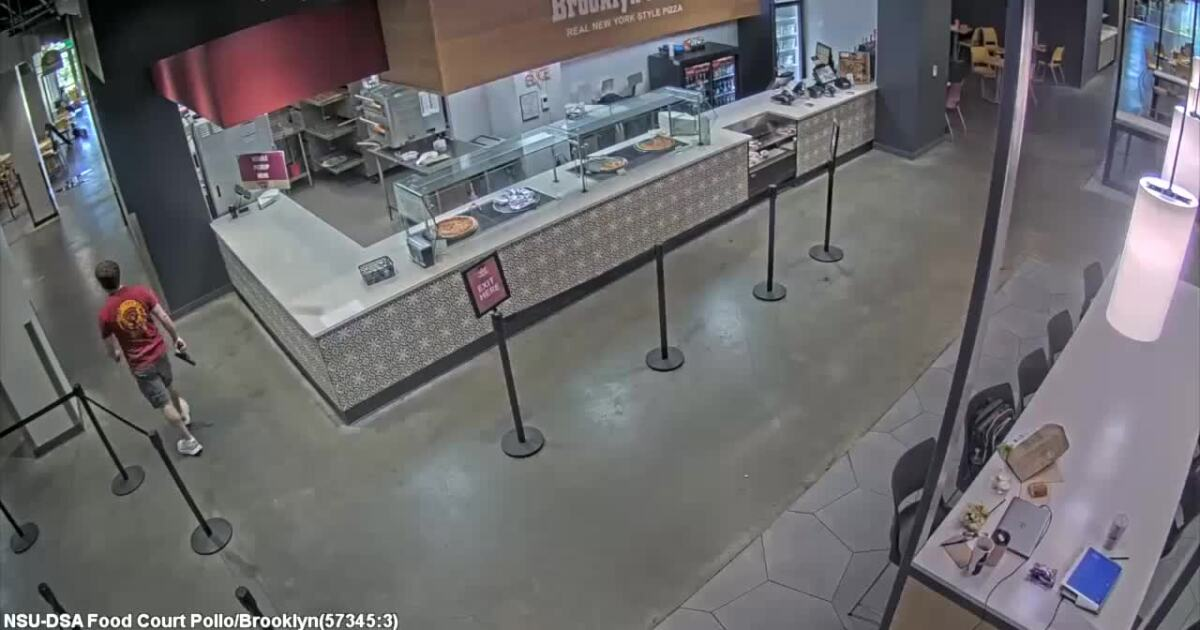
Ikner inside the Student Union during the shooting

At 11:59:30 a.m., the suspect re-entered the Student Union. Seconds later, at 11:59:42 a.m., he ran up behind campus dining director Robert Morales in the food court and shot him twice in the back, then shot him two more times, killing him. At 11:59:54 a.m., he chased a student out of the building while shooting at her. He exited the building at 12:00:05 p.m. The university's alert system issued its first active shooter alert after 12:00 p.m. and a second at 12:19 p.m. About 15 minutes after the alert, police escorted all remaining students out of the building.

One student described seeing the suspect fire in her direction, estimating she heard about 15 rounds fired indiscriminately over 20 to 30 seconds. She said the suspect had arrived in an orange Hummer and began firing before drawing a pistol and shooting a woman standing nearby. Another eyewitness said the suspect approached her, reloaded his weapon, and calmly said "Keep running" before she fled.

A student who had been in a restroom when the shooting began initially thought the roof was collapsing; other students who rushed in alerted her to the danger. Four of them held the restroom door shut, as it had no lock, before being evacuated. Another group recounted barricading themselves behind trash cans and plywood in the Student Union basement. One student noted that a fellow survivor of the Parkland high school shooting was sheltering with them and exclaimed, "Man, I never thought this would happen again."

Shortly after 3:00 p.m., the university lifted the lockdown for most of the campus, with nine buildings remaining under lockdown as active crime scenes. The suspect was shot by police at 12:00:27 p.m. — three minutes and three seconds after the first shot — after refusing to comply with officers' commands. Just before he was shot, he had been standing outside the Student Union building, firing at another person trying to flee. Students nearby were advised to remain indoors and not return to the building to retrieve personal belongings.

A widely shared video from the scene showed a bystander walking past a woman who had been shot and was lying on the grass, choosing to drink a Starbucks coffee rather than render aid. The video prompted widespread outrage on social media.

Two firearms were recovered by police: one on the arrested suspect and one in a nearby parked car. One of the firearms was the former service weapon of the suspect's stepmother, a Leon County Sheriff's deputy.

== Victims ==
On the afternoon of April 17, Florida State University chief of police Jason Trumbower reported that two people had been killed and seven others injured — including the suspect — all of whom were admitted to Tallahassee Memorial Hospital. Five of the victims had been shot, and one was injured while fleeing the scene. The two people killed were adult males who were not enrolled students at the university. They were identified as Robert Morales, 57, the campus dining director, and Tiru Chabba, 45, an employee of a campus vendor. Chabba was a regional vice president at Aramark Collegiate Hospitality. Morales was from Miami-Dade County and Chabba was from Greenville, South Carolina. Morales had worked in university dining services and as an assistant football coach at Leon High School in Tallahassee since 2015.

All seven injured victims were reported to be in fair condition on the day of the shooting. One was a 23-year-old graduate student who was shot in the buttocks while fleeing. Tallahassee Police Department Chief Lawrence Revell said there appeared to be no prior connection between the shooter and the victims. By April 18, two victims were expected to be discharged, three were in good condition, and one remained in fair condition. A surgeon said he expected all injured victims to make a full recovery.

== Aftermath ==
The university canceled all classes and business operations through April 18 and all home athletic events through April 20. Classes at nearby Florida A&M University and Tallahassee State College were also canceled. Police increased patrols on the campus of Florida International University in response to the shooting.

A large makeshift memorial was established on a sidewalk near the shooting site, with crosses bearing the victims' names. The university held a vigil for the victims at Langford Green, in front of Doak Campbell Stadium, on the afternoon of April 18.

The FSU Foundation established a Student Emergency Fund to provide financial support to students and families affected by the shooting.

== Accused ==
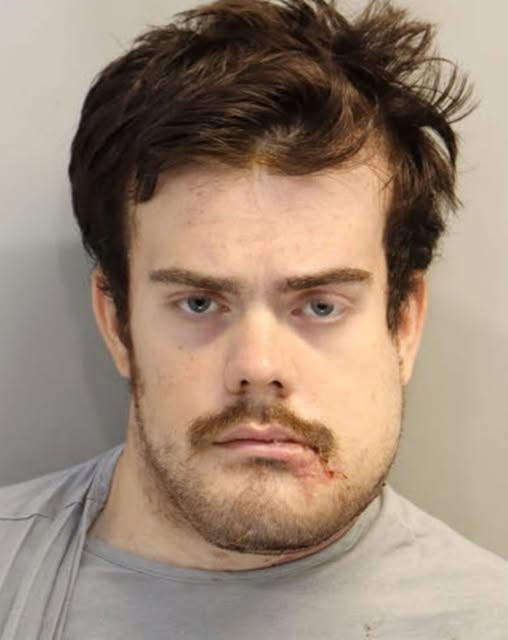
Mugshot of Ikner

The suspect, Phoenix Ikner (born August 18, 2004), was a student at the university and a dual American-Norwegian citizen. He was the stepson of a Leon County Sheriff's Office reserve deputy. Ikner obtained both guns used in the attack from his stepmother. He graduated from Lincoln High School in May 2022 and subsequently attended Tallahassee State College (TSC) before transferring to FSU.

Ikner was born Christian Gunnar Eriksen; his name was changed to Phoenix Ikner in 2020. Leon County court records from 2011 show that at age six he was required to repeat kindergarten, while his parents engaged in a prolonged and bitter custody dispute, trading allegations of domestic violence and stalking and requiring repeated judicial intervention. The legal battle lasted nearly his entire childhood, ending only when he reached adulthood and most family court matters became moot.

Ikner lived in Tallahassee for most of his life, though he was registered in the Norwegian population register under his Norwegian name. In March 2015, when Ikner was ten, his biological mother — who was born in Oslo, Norway — took him to Fort Lauderdale–Hollywood International Airport and boarded a Scandinavian Airlines flight to Oslo, falsely telling his father that she was taking him to South Florida for spring break, in violation of the custody agreement. Four months later, on July 27, 2015, she was arrested at the same airport on a kidnapping charge, and both she and Ikner were returned to Leon County.

Ikner's father discovered the abduction when his son told him during a phone call. He alerted authorities, noting that Ikner "has both developmental delays and special needs" and would be without access to his regular doctors. A Leon County Sheriff's Office affidavit stated that Ikner was "on medication for several health and mental issues, to include a growth hormone disorder and ADHD." Despite Ikner's disappearance, Florida authorities did not issue an Amber Alert or activate the Emergency Alert System. In October 2015, his biological mother filed a lawsuit alleging slander and libel against Ikner's father, stepmother, and two other relatives, seeking $80,000 in damages to apply toward Ikner's college fund.

Back in Tallahassee, Ikner was a member of the Leon County Sheriff's Office Youth Advisory Council from 2021 to 2022. In later years, he espoused white supremacist, far-right, and homophobic views and was removed from a political group at TSC. He also expressed support for President Donald Trump's agenda. He held a fascination with Adolf Hitler and Nazism, frequently argued with others over politics, and participated in online hate groups. He used an image of Hitler for one gaming account and named another account after the Schutzstaffel. He also referred to himself as incel and Baptist with anti-Israel and fascist views.

His stepmother, Jessica Ikner, was a Leon County middle school deputy and was named one of two "2011 Deputies of the Year" at the Leon County Sheriff's Office Citizen's Academy banquet in May 2011.

== Legal proceedings ==
Ikner, shot once in the jaw by law enforcement, was hospitalized with significant injuries and, as of April 18, 2025, was not speaking to investigators.

After a month of hospitalization and multiple surgeries, Ikner was released on May 12, 2025. He was taken to the Leon County Detention Facility and later transferred to the Wakulla County Detention Facility in Crawfordville, Florida, as standard protocol given his family connection to the Leon County Sheriff's Office. That same day, he was charged in court with two counts of murder and seven counts of attempted murder with a firearm. He was denied bond and ordered to have no contact with any victims or witnesses.

On May 14, 2025, Ikner was indicted by a grand jury on the same charges. The grand jury found that he acted alone and noted the absence of "mental health or behavioral referrals indicating him as a threat" during his attendance at Leon County Schools, Tallahassee State College, and Florida State University. The grand jury also found that the Florida State University police officer who shot Ikner was justified in the use of force. On June 5, 2025, Florida prosecutors announced their intent to seek the death penalty for Ikner.

In September 2025, the trial was postponed to March 30, 2026, after Ikner's public defender was reassigned due to a conflict of interest. On October 1, 2025, the trial was further postponed to October 19, 2026. On August 17, 2026, the trial was again postponed until June 8, 2027, after defense attorneys filed a motion to continue, citing a large volume of evidence and observed mental health issues with Ikner.

== Reactions ==
Ikner's biological mother, Anne-Mari Eriksen, spoke privately to WPLG, then an ABC affiliate in Miami, at her Tallahassee apartment. She said her son had never shown interest in hunting as a child and that she had not seen him in several years before the shooting because she had been estranged from him. She said she had long been concerned about him after his isolation from her and that "all she wanted for him was a loving environment."

Ikner's maternal grandmother, Susan Eriksen, described him as the sweetest and smartest boy and blamed his father and stepmother for their influence over him, calling them "rotten bastard people" while breaking down in tears multiple times during an interview. She revealed that she and Ikner's biological mother had not seen him since 2015, despite repeated attempts following the custody dispute.

=== Political ===
President Donald Trump, informed about the shooting during a press briefing in the Oval Office, said, "It's a horrible thing. It's horrible that things like this take place, and we'll have more to say about it later."

Governor Ron DeSantis and U.S. Attorney General Pam Bondi said they were praying for the law enforcement officers who responded to the shooting. Senator Ashley Moody said she was "praying for the safety of the students." DeSantis ordered flags to be flown at half-staff through April 21 in Florida to honor the victims and recognize the first responders.

Secretary of Homeland Security Kristi Noem said her "heart breaks for the students, their families, and faculty at Florida State University." FBI Director Kash Patel said he and his team had been briefed on the shooting and posted on X that his agency would "provide full support to local law enforcement as needed," adding, "Please keep the FSU community in your prayers."

Then-Democratic National Committee Vice Chair and Parkland survivor David Hogg was interviewed shortly after the shooting and expressed concern about gun safety, noting how other Parkland survivors had been affected by experiencing a second school shooting in less than eight years.

=== Legal proceedings and lawsuits ===
On April 30, 2025, a civil rights attorney from the Strom Law Firm, representing the Chabba family, called on Florida State University to conduct a transparent investigation into the shooting. No lawsuit was filed at that time. FSU president Richard McCullough responded:

"I appreciate the words of the Chabba family's attorneys today. I and everyone else at Florida State share the family's grief. We share their anger. We share their desire for answers."

The Strom Law Firm and other law firms that represent the Chabba family announce filing a lawsuit on May 10 against OpenAI and Phoenix Ikner himself and his family in federal court that alleges negligence. The lawsuit claims OpenAI makes profits over security and has failed to stop the shooter's plans of using the chatbot to lead to the shooting.

In June 2025, the Brooks, LeBoeuf, Foster, Gwartney & Hobbs law firm announced it would represent the wife of Robert Morales in seeking justice following his death. By July 2025, Morales' legal team had reached an out-of-court settlement with Florida State University for $100,000 and four semesters of FSU tuition for his surviving daughter. In August 2025, they secured an additional $305,000 from the shooter's parents' homeowners insurance company.

In April 2026, Morales' legal team announced plans to file a lawsuit against OpenAI, alleging that the shooter had used ChatGPT extensively in planning the attack. Court documents revealed over 270 messages between Ikner and the chatbot. His lawyers stated they had been advised that the shooter was in constant communication with ChatGPT leading up to the attack and believed ChatGPT may have provided guidance on how to commit it.

Morales' legal team also sent a letter, dated September 9, 2025, to the Leon County Sheriff's Office alleging potential liability on the part of the shooter's stepmother for allowing Ikner — whom they described as mentally unstable — to have access to firearms, including the former service weapon used in the shooting.

On August 31, 2026, Morales family lawyer Dean R. LeBoeuf announced a lawsuit against OpenAI and Samuel Altman for criminal negligence. The family demands accountability and a cessation of such deaths, having filed the case in federal court in Tallahassee after failed settlement discussions. LeBoeuf claims OpenAI was aware of risks associated with its software, particularly concerning the shooter, Phoenix Ikner, and criticizes its inaction. He predicts that similar cases may be consolidated and potentially reviewed by the United States Supreme Court. The Morales family is seeking a jury trial and punitive damages.

Attorney Judd Rosen filed a lawsuit against OpenAI and CEO Samuel Altman on June 25, 2026, on behalf of an FSU student, Alianna Grant from Miami-Dade County, who survived the shooting and is seeking $50,000 in damages.

On July 14, 2026, Morgan and Morgan, represented by attorney John Morgan and another lawyer, filed a lawsuit against OpenAI and Samuel Altman on behalf of two shooting survivors, seeking damages for the shooter's use of AI in the shooting plan. On August 31, 2026, Morgan and Morgan initiated a lawsuit against the Florida State University Board of Trustees on behalf of survivor Madison Askins, alleging criminally negligent security following a shooting. The complaint claims that FSU failed to meet its obligation to ensure student safety, particularly by not conducting thorough inspections to identify potential hazards at the student union. The lawsuit invokes the legal doctrine of respondeat superior, holding the FSU Trustees responsible for their employees' negligence. Damages exceeding $50,000 are being sought, along with a jury trial.

On August 27, 2026, another shooting survivor filed a $75,000 lawsuit against OpenAI.

=== ChatGPT ===
Court documents revealed that Ikner used ChatGPT extensively on the day of the shooting, asking it questions about how the media would likely cover a mass shooting, whether three casualties would attract sufficient national attention, when the previous school shooting had occurred, and how the public would react to a shooting at FSU. He also asked about what type of firearm and ammunition to use and the best time to arrive on campus. According to the chatbot's response, national media coverage was likely if there were three or more victims. He also asked about the busiest periods at the FSU Student Union before ending the conversation.

In response, OpenAI stated that in late April 2025, it had discovered a ChatGPT account believed to be connected to the shooter and had proactively shared this information with law enforcement. Florida Attorney General James Uthmeier subsequently announced a criminal investigation into ChatGPT's role in the attack.

On June 1, 2026, it was announced that Florida would be suing OpenAI and its CEO Sam Altman, in the alleged role played in helping Phoenix carry out the shooting, indicating that ChatGPT is unsafe for children. Florida is the first state to sue OpenAI for its harmful content.

=== Activists and organizations ===
Fred Guttenberg, whose daughter Jaime was killed in the Parkland shooting, spoke out, saying all he wanted was "to help our children be safe." He noted that some of his daughter's friends had been at the Student Union and had now survived a second school shooting. Other Parkland parents and survivors made similar statements: Manuel Oliver, father of victim Joaquin Oliver, said, "I don't understand how anyone could be surprised," and the brother of victim Alyssa Alhadeff said, "I thought this would never happen again...but it continuously keeps happening — and something has to change."

The Miami Heat released a statement saying the team was "devastated by the senseless gun violence that claimed innocent lives in our state," noting that many members of the organization were FSU alumni or parents of current students, some of whom had barricaded themselves in dormitory rooms during the attack. The statement concluded: "These students should be preparing for finals, not wondering if they should prepare to say final goodbyes. How many more of these events must take place before meaningful reform is enacted to end this epidemic?"

== See also ==
- History of Florida State University
- List of shootings in Florida
- List of school shootings in the United States by death toll
- List of mass shootings in the United States in 2025
- List of school shootings in the United States (2000–present)
- Florida State University Chi Omega murders
- Parkland high school shooting
