= Peter Avsenew =

American convicted murderer (born 1984)

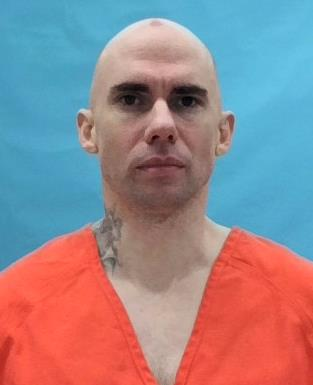
- Born: November 12, 1984 (age 41); Florida, U.S.
- Convictions: First degree murder (×2); Robbery; Felony possession of a weapon Credit card fraud Motor vehicle theft
- Penalty: Death

Details
- Victims: 2
- Date: December 23, 2010
- State: Florida
- Date apprehended: December 28, 2010
- Imprisoned at: Union Correctional Institution

Peter Serge Avsenew (born November 12, 1984) is an American convicted murderer who was sentenced to death for the 2010 murder of a homosexual couple in Broward County, Florida. Avsenew committed the murders on December 23, 2010, when he bludgeoned and fatally shot Stephen Adams and Kevin Powell, aged 52 and 47 respectively, at their home in Wilton Manors. Avsenew was arrested within a week after the double murder, and subsequently put on trial for first-degree murder charges, for which he was found guilty and sentenced to death. Avsenew remains on death row awaiting execution as of 2026.

== Murders ==
On December 23, 2010, 26-year-old Peter Serge Avsenew committed the murders of a homosexual male couple in Wilton Manors, Florida.

Several weeks before the double murder, Avsenew posted a sexually suggestive ad on Craigslist, offering his services to an older male couple, and later, a middle-aged couple, 47-year-old Kevin Mark Powell and 52-year-old Stephen Duane Adams, responded to the ad and took Avsenew into their Wilton Manors house, where he stayed with the couple for weeks leading up to their murders. At that point, both Powell and Adams were in a relationship for nearly 30 years.

On December 23, 2010, two days before Christmas, Avsenew attacked the couple and shot them dead inside their house. During the attack, Adams was shot nine times in the head, while Powell was beaten with a blunt object and shot twice in the head. After killing the two victims, Avsenew ransacked the house and stole the men's credit cards, money and black Saturn SUV before he escaped the house. He went on to shop for outdoor supplies and fled to the north of Florida, and returned to his mother's house.

The murders of the couple were only discovered three days later on December 26, 2010. At that point, one of the men's sister filed a police report and requested a welfare check because her brother did not come back home to celebrate Christmas with the family, and the police discovered the couple's bodies wrapped in blankets inside the house, and managed to identify the victims.

== Charges ==
After the double murder, Peter Avsenew drove the victims' SUV to his mother's house in Polk County, and according to his mother, she noticed her son was agitated and upset, and told him to take a shower. Avsenew allegedly told her on that particular occasion that he wanted to get the smell of bleach off him, and in another instance, he confided to his mother that "he had done something really bad". Due to this, Avsenew's mother gradually became suspicious and later called the police.

On December 28, 2010, Avsenew was arrested in Polk County as a suspect behind the murders of Kevin Powell and Stephen Adams, but was not formally charged at this point, and he was held in custody for an unrelated charge of violating his probation for a past case of grand theft.

This was not the first time Avsenew had been arrested for violating the law. Since 2003, Avsenew had been arrested in connection with numerous offenses and was convicted of vehicle theft, robbery, grand theft, and fraud involving bounced checks. In addition, Avsenew pleaded no contest to several other charges, including marijuana possession, loitering, possession of drug paraphernalia, criminal mischief, and resisting an officer without violence.

On March 23, 2011, while he was pending to be charged for the Wilton Manors double murder, Avsenew, who was originally detained at the Polk County Jail, was transferred to the Miami-Dade County Jail.

On March 24, 2011, a Broward County grand jury formally indicted Avsenew for two counts of first-degree murder, two counts of armed robbery, possession of a firearm by a convicted felon, unlawful use of a credit card, and grand theft.

== Trial ==
=== Proceedings and conviction ===
In October 2017, an appellate court granted the prosecution's application to seek the death penalty for Peter Avsenew, whose trial was scheduled for early November 2017. This motion was filed due to the court overturning a circuit judge's ruling in an unrelated case which barred the state from seeking the death penalty for Avsenew and other suspects facing capital trials in Florida. Ultimately, Avsenew's trial began on November 17, 2017, before a 12-member jury at the Broward County Circuit Court.

During the trial, Avsenew's mother became a witness for the prosecution and testified against her son. Due to her poor health, which rendered her unfit for travel to Broward County to testify at Avsenew's trial, Avsenew's mother recorded a video of her testimony and it was presented in court to the jury, which incriminated her son as the perpetrator in the murders. However, Avsenew protested his innocence and claimed that he was just a witness of the murders. Avsenew claimed that when he came home sometime after the murders, he discovered the corpses of the deceased victims, and he left the house after he took their belongings. In response, the prosecution argued that Avsenew was indeed the killer based on the objective evidence that placed him at the scene of crime. They also cited a phone call which Avsenew made to a woman from prison, in which he described himself as a "stone cold killer".

On November 30, 2017, the jury found Avsenew guilty of the first-degree murders of Kevin Powell and Stephen Adams. As a result of Avsenew's conviction, he faced a potential death sentence for murdering the couple.

=== Sentencing ===
On January 10, 2018, the sentencing trial of Avsenew proceeded before the same jury. One significant aspect of the hearing was that, Avsenew had fired his lawyers and opted to represent himself in the proceedings, and he never called any witnesses to the stand to testify in his defence. The prosecution, meanwhile, sought the death penalty for the double murder and cited the aggravating factors in favour of a death sentence. Adams's sister came to the stand and testified about the emotional impact of losing her brother, and added that their father died in 2015 but not before he forgave his son's killer. Powell's stepsister testified in her victim impact statement that it was hard to express the sadness the family felt when they lost Powell, adding that he had undergone a double organ transplant months before the murder, which made it more difficult to comprehend that he was brutally killed after overcoming it.

A day later, on January 11, 2018, after less than three hours of deliberation, the jury unanimously agreed to sentence Avsenew to death for both counts of first-degree murder. Avsenew became the first defendant in Broward County to be sentenced to death by the jury's unanimous decision after the law was amended in the previous year to allow the imposition of death sentences based on unanimous jury votes in Florida.

Before his formal sentencing could take place, Avsenew appeared in a hearing on June 28, 2018, during which he made a defiant statement to the judge, proclaiming that he had nothing else to lose and not sorry for his actions, and threatened to cause more harm and kill more people. Avsenew went as far as to state that as a white man, he had the duty to "cull the weak and timid from existence", and described homosexuality as a "disease to mankind" which should be removed. Prior to her son's sentencing, Avsenew's mother expressed that she had mixed feelings about the death penalty, but she knew that her son did not want to spend the rest of his life in prison. An independent attorney, Art Marchetta, was appointed by the judge to research Avsenew's background and present it in court, and he submitted evidence which showed that Avsenew's sister was murdered when he was eight, and he was sexually abused by his stepfather during his adolescence.

On August 28, 2018, Avsenew was formally sentenced to death by Broward Circuit Judge Ilona M. Holmes, who found that the murders of Powell and Adams were "especially heinous, atrocious or cruel" and committed in a "cold, calculated and premeditated" manner, and the aggravating factors made it appropriate to sentence Avsenew to death, because in the judge's words, "nothing about (Avsenew)'s age, physical condition, background or mental status, suggests that the ultimate sentence of death for such conduct (was) disproportionate".

According to reports, Avsenew showed no remorse or emotion throughout the hearing when the death sentence was meted out. However, he pointed a middle finger at the bereaved families of Adams and Powell before they departed the courtroom. In response to Avsenew's rude gesture, Adams's sister told the press that she was happy that Avsenew received the death penalty for murdering her brother.

== Appeal and re-trial ==
On January 13, 2022, the Florida Supreme Court allowed Peter Avsenew's appeal and overturned his death sentences and murder convictions, and ordered a re-trial for Avsenew in the double killings. In their judgement, the court found that the testimony of Avsenew's mother, which was admitted as state evidence against her son, constituted as a harmful error, because it violated a judiciary rule where the court should "keep the defendant in the presence of the witness", and hence, based on this technicality, the conviction cannot stand and therefore overturned.

In April 2022, Avsenew's mother died of cancer before she could appear in court to testify in her son's upcoming murder re-trial. That same month, the prosecution were disallowed from using the testimony of Avsenew's mother to prosecute him in his re-trial.

On June 10, 2022, after deliberating for five hours over the previous two days, a different jury once again convicted Avsenew of two counts of first-degree murder at the end of his re-trial, in addition to robbery with a firearm, credit card fraud and grand theft of a vehicle.

On October 11, 2022, Avsenew was once again sentenced to death after all the 12 jurors unanimously agreed to impose the death penalty, although he still had to undergo formal sentencing by Broward Circuit Judge Martin Fein on a date to be decided.

On November 11, 2022, it was reported that the jury had engaged in alleged misconduct while deciding on the death penalty for Avsenew, because prior to making their decision, some of the jurors had watched a documentary about the murders, and conversed on WhatsApp about the crime and made up their minds months ahead of time, and even searched through the internet for information that were not presented to the jury in court. As a result, the judge wanted to question two of the jurors regarding the allegations. The foreman eventually admitted that he did watch the documentary that covered the case.

On November 21, 2022, in light of the jury misconduct in his re-sentencing trial, Avsenew filed a motion seeking a new trial for the murders.

On December 8, 2022, Avsenew was granted a new re-sentencing trial by Judge Fein, who overturned the jury's death penalty verdict. Nonetheless, the judge upheld the defendant's murder conviction.

== Second re-sentencing trial ==
On September 26, 2023, about a month before Peter Avsenew's second re-sentencing trial, prosecutors informed Avsenew and his attorneys that they would no longer seek the death penalty at the upcoming hearing if he agreed to abandon his allegations of jury misconduct. Under the proposed agreement, Avsenew would instead receive a sentence of life imprisonment without the possibility of parole. Despite his attorneys' recommendation that he accept the offer, Avsenew rejected it, stating that he would rather risk receiving a death sentence. By that time, Florida had enacted a new death penalty law eliminating the requirement for a unanimous jury recommendation. Instead, a death sentence could be imposed if at least eight jurors voted in favor of it. Three days later, on September 29, 2023, Avsenew was set to represent himself in court during his second re-sentencing trial.

The re-sentencing hearing began on October 18, 2023, and the prosecution presented its case, including the aggravating factors cited to justify a death sentence for Avsenew and the summoning of witnesses to testify; Avsenew was reportedly silent throughout the proceedings and neither made an opening statement nor cross-examine any witnesses. When giving his testimony, Avsenew stated he should not be sentenced to death for two reasons, one of them was his good conduct while in prison. The other reason was that he did not deserve to be executed since the most notorious killer from Broward County, Nikolas Cruz, was spared the death sentence. Cruz was found guilty of murdering 17 students and staff members during the 2018 Parkland high school shooting but was sentenced to life without parole due to the jury failing to reach a unanimous vote for capital punishment.

On October 19, 2023, the jury unanimously recommended the death penalty for Avsenew. A formal sentencing hearing was scheduled on December 5, 2023, for the judge to decide on Avsenew's sentence.

On December 8, 2023, Avsenew was formally re-sentenced to death by Broward Circuit Judge Martin Fein for the double murder. Avsenew was additionally sentenced to life in prison for firearm robbery and five years each for vehicular grand theft and credit card fraud.

As of 2026, Avsenew remains incarcerated at the Suwannee Correctional Institution.

== Aftermath ==
A decade after the murders of Kevin Powell and Stephen Adams, the ninth season of Evil Lives Here re-enacted the crime and first aired it on February 21, 2021, as the 2nd episode.

== See also ==
- Capital punishment in Florida
- List of death row inmates in the United States § Florida
- History of violence against LGBTQ people in the United States
