= 2023 Jacksonville shooting =

Mass shooting in Florida, US

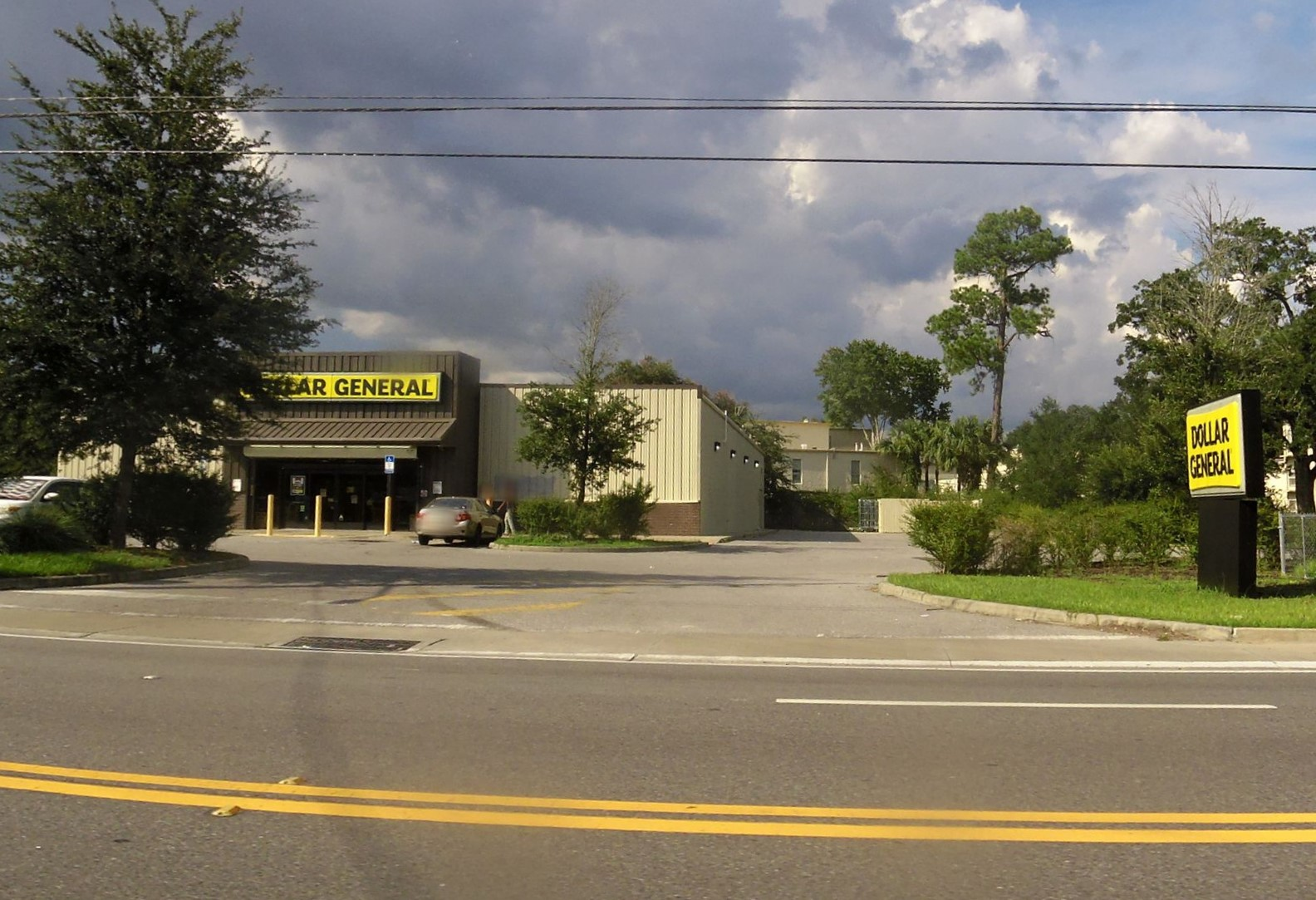
- The Dollar General store photographed in 2020
- Location: 30°20′57″N 81°41′46″W; 2161 Kings Road, Jacksonville, Florida, U.S.
- Date: August 26, 2023; 3 years ago 1:08 p.m. – 1:19 p.m. (EDT; UTC−04:00)
- Target: African Americans
- Attack type: Triple-murder; murder suicide; domestic terrorism; hate crime
- Weapons: 5.56 NATO Palmetto State Armory PA-15 AR-15 style semi-automatic rifle; 10mm Glock 20 Gen4 semi-automatic pistol
- Deaths: 4 (including the perpetrator)
- Injuries: 0
- Perpetrator: Ryan Christopher Palmeter
- Motive: Right-wing terrorism Racism against African Americans; Christchurch mosque shootings copycat crime

On August 26, 2023, three black people were fatally shot by a gunman in a racially-motivated terrorist attack at a Dollar General store in Jacksonville, Florida. Authorities identified 21-year-old male Ryan Christopher Palmeter as the gunman. Palmeter shot and killed himself after he barricaded himself in an office. The incident has been described as a terrorist attack and racially motivated, and was investigated as a hate crime.

== Shooting ==
According to police, by 11:39 a.m. EDT, Ryan Christopher Palmeter left his home in Clay County, Florida. At 12:48 p.m., he arrived at Edward Waters University and put on a tactical vest at the back of his car. A TikTok video of Palmeter putting on the vest was recorded by a bystander and uploaded online. At 12:55 p.m., campus security arrived at his location and asked for identification. Palmeter failed to identify himself and left the parking lot at 12:57 p.m.; he was shadowed by a campus security officer who was leaving at 12:58 p.m. Before 1:08 p.m., the campus officer flagged down a police officer who then started processing a BOLO alert.

At 1:08 p.m., Palmeter shot 11 rounds from the PA-15 into the front windshield of a car outside the Dollar General store, killing the driver. The gunfire triggered a nearby ShotSpotter device. He then entered the store and killed another victim with the rifle. Palmeter wore body armor, a face covering, blue rubber gloves, and ear protection during the shooting. Multiple people fled through the store's rear exit, with Palmeter exiting the same door shortly after. At 1:09 p.m., a one-round ShotSpotter alert went off, followed by Palmeter reentering the store through the rear door and attempting to shoot a security camera but missing. At that time, the first 911 voice call was received. At 1:10 p.m., two more customers entered the store through the front door. At 1:13 p.m., Palmeter killed one of them with the Glock, then chased the other person around the store, shooting at her but missing. The woman was able to exit through the rear door, with Palmeter following after her, shooting out the same door, and then reentering the building. At an unknown time, Palmeter fired multiple rounds at responding officers, hitting a police cruiser without injuring the occupant, before retreating back into the store.

At 1:14 p.m., Palmeter entered an office; four minutes later, he sent a text message to his father, instructing him to use a screwdriver to enter his room. There, his father found a last will and testament and a suicide note on Palmeter's laptop. At 1:19 p.m., 11 minutes after the first shots were fired, police officers entered the building and heard a single shot, suspected to be Palmeter killing himself. His parents contacted the police at 1:53 p.m. At 3:44 p.m., SWAT confirmed Palmeter was dead. At least three manifestos were found on his body, including those addressed to his parents, the news media, and federal agents. All three victims were black, consistent with an intent to kill black people as Palmeter wrote in the manifestos.

== Victims ==
Three people, all of whom were black, were fatally shot. The victims were identified as Angela Michelle Carr, 52; Jerrald Gallion, 29; and Anolt Joseph Laguerre Jr., 19. Laguerre was an employee at the store.

== Perpetrator ==
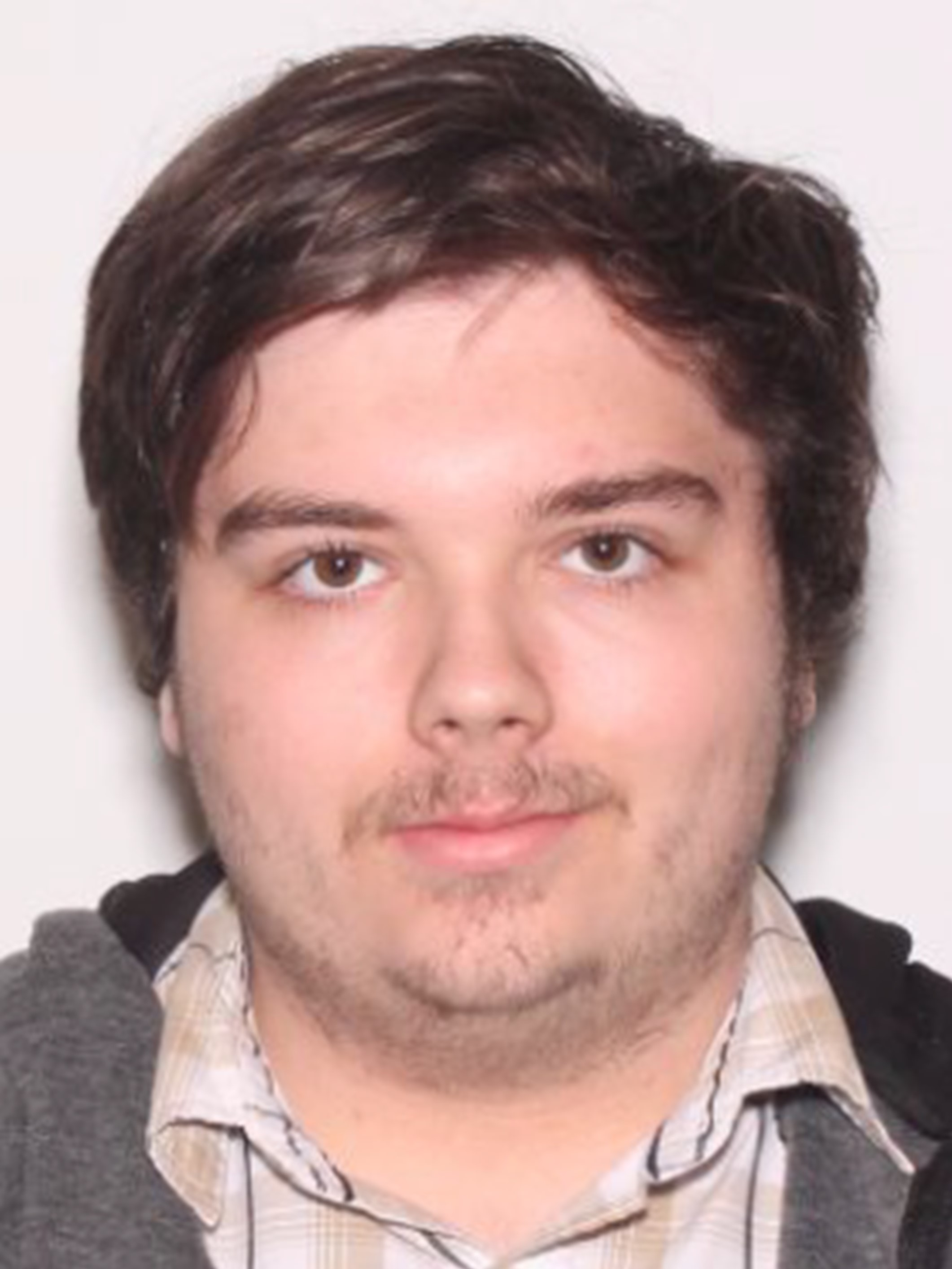
Photograph of Palmeter provided by Jacksonville police

The shooter, Ryan Christopher Palmeter (November 28, 2001 – August 26, 2023), was a 21-year-old white male from Orange Park, Florida, who lived in the Oakleaf Plantation area of Jacksonville before he killed himself during the shooting. Palmeter was a former student at both Oakleaf High School and Flagler College, and worked at The Home Depot. In 2016, he was the subject of a domestic police call between him and his brother. In 2017, he was the subject of a Baker Act call, used to place persons under involuntary detainment for mental health examination for up to 72 hours.

Jacksonville police showed images of Palmeter's AR-15–style rifle bearing a swastika and racial slurs drawn in white sharpie, along with a Glock pistol without markings. He acquired the pistol in April 2023 and the rifle in June 2023. Both weapons were obtained legally through FFL-transfer, which require background checks, and the police said Palmeter was legally allowed to possess them. Palmeter's vest had a Rhodesian Army patch on it, a symbol which had previously been used by other white supremacists, including Dylann Roof, the perpetrator of the Charleston church shooting.

=== Manifesto ===
In January 2024, the Jacksonville Sheriff's Office released a manifesto written by Palmeter titled A White Boy Summer to Remember. The manifesto is described as racist, homophobic and transphobic. Palmeter mentioned Brenton Tarrant – the perpetrator of the Christchurch mosque shootings, citing him as the main inspiration. The manifesto contained multiple online characters, such as Chudjak, a meme used to mock people with more right wing views, and a character infamous on the web forum, Kiwi Farms. He also promoted conspiracy theories such as the harvesting of adrenochrome and the "frazzledrip" video. It features lyrics from the white supremacist song "We'll Have Our Home Again".

== Reactions ==
In response to the shooting, President Joe Biden said that "white supremacy has no place in America." He also noted that the shooting had taken place on the same day as the commemoration for the 60th anniversary of the March on Washington, a famous civil rights rally.

Governor Ron DeSantis issued a statement in which he referred to Palmeter as a "scumbag" and a "coward" for killing himself instead of facing responsibility for his actions. On August 27, DeSantis visited Jacksonville to attend a vigil for the victims. When he attempted to address the crowd, he was booed, forcing him to step away from the microphone. It prompted Jacksonville councilwoman Ju'Coby Pittman to step in and ask the mourners to settle down, saying, "We are going to put parties aside because it ain't about parties today," before adding "A bullet don't know a party."

Florida state representative Angie Nixon criticized DeSantis and called the shooting "a stark reminder of the dangerous consequences of unchecked racism."

== See also ==
- History of African Americans in Jacksonville
- List of shootings in Florida
- 2018 Jeffersontown shooting – White supremacist terror attack against African Americans
- 2022 Buffalo shooting – Mass shooting in New York, U.S.
