= 2011 Medford pharmacy shooting =

Mass shooting in New York, U.S.

2011 Medford pharmacy shootings
- Location: 40.8011°N 73.0037°W; Haven Drugs, Medford, New York, U.S.
- Date: June 19, 2011; 15 years ago c. 10:20 a.m.
- Attack type: Mass shooting; mass murder
- Weapon: .45-caliber semi-automatic pistol
- Deaths: 4
- Injuries: 0
- Perpetrator: David Saul Laffer
- Motive: Drug addiction, robbery

On June 19, 2011, four people were killed at Haven Drugs, a pharmacy in Medford, New York, United States, during a robbery. The perpetrator, David Saul Laffer, committed the shooting after he had lost his job and was with his wife. Laffer was sentenced to life without parole, and his wife was sentenced to 25 years in prison.

A doctor who had previously sold Laffer drugs, and was discovered in the aftermath to have been running a pill mill that led to the overdose deaths of several people, was sentenced to up to 20 years in prison.

== Background ==
Laffer and his wife both had an opioid addiction. Laffer and his wife were caught on security camera visiting an illegal pharmacy, later described as a "pill mill", the week before the shootings. The man operating the clinic, Stan Xuhui Li, had previously sold him drugs.

== Shooting ==
Laffer entered the pharmacy with a backpack and set it down on the counter with his right hand in the bag holding his handgun. Laffer then asked 17-year-old employee Jennifer Mejia if he could speak privately with 45-year-old Raymond Ferguson who was also an employee at the pharmacy. She then walked a few feet away and Laffer continued to talk to the pharmacist about several medications. Laffer suddenly opened fire with his handgun and shot Ferguson in the abdomen. He then turned his attention to Mejia and fatally shot her two times. Laffer then walked back to Ferguson who was lying on his back and proceeded to fatally shoot him two times. Laffer then started looking for drugs behind the counter until he saw someone approaching the pharmacy. He then hurried to the front of the pharmacy and hid. When 71-year-old Bryon Sheffield walked in, Laffer shot and killed him execution style. Laffer then started filling his bag with pills but then got distracted when he saw 33-year-old Jaime Taccetta walking towards the pharmacy. When Taccetta walked into the pharmacy Laffer proceeded to fatally shoot her. After this, he walked back and forth from the pharmacy counter filling his bag with prescription pills. A .45-caliber semi-automatic pistol was used in the shooting.

He stole a bag's worth of painkillers, wiped the counter, and fled. Laffer stole over 11,000 hydrocodone pills. His wife was outside in a getaway car.

He fired seven shots during the shooting; three hit the pharmacist, two hit his assistant, and each customer was shot one time.

== Perpetrator ==
David Saul Laffer (born November 16, 1977) is a longtime resident of Medford, who graduated from Patchogue-Medford High School in 1995 before joining the U.S. Army afterward. In May 2023, while serving his time at Elmira Correctional Facility in Elmira, New York, Laffer broke a decade of silence in an interview with News 12 Networks about his regrets, prison life, gun violence, the accessibility of guns, and the five minutes he wishes he could take back.

== Aftermath ==
Laffer was arrested on June 22. The next day, he was booked in court, and pled not guilty. According to Laffer, the motivation for the robbery/murders was because he had lost his job and his wife needed painkillers.

On November 10, Laffer was sentenced to life without parole. His wife was sentenced to 25 years on robbery charges, the maximum sentence allowed. During the trial, the judge described him as someone with "unnatural viciousness", and promised that he would have Laffer placed in solitary confinement for the rest of his life: corrections officials pointed out only they had the ability to decide this. Dr. Li, the operator of the illegal pharmacy, was later sentenced to up to 20 years in prison in December 2014, for selling illegal prescriptions to Laffer and manslaughter, as two of his patients had overdosed.
