= 2024 Orlando Halloween shooting =

Mass shooting in Florida, U.S.

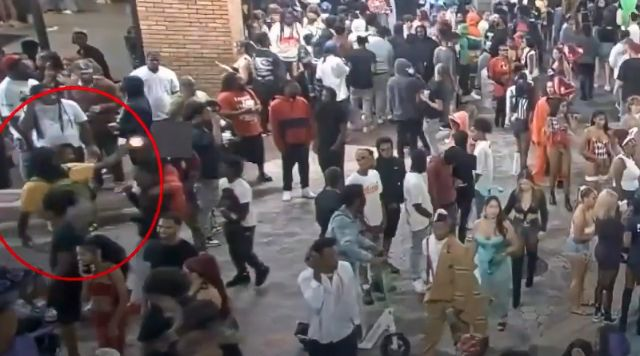
- A CCTV still showing Edgar opening fire, killing Hill
- Location: 28°32′31.67″N 81°22′44.54″W; Downtown Orlando, Florida, U.S.
- Date: November 1, 2024; 1:07 a.m. – 1:11 a.m. (EST)
- Target: Large crowds
- Attack type: Mass shooting
- Weapon: Springfield Armory 9x19mm handgun
- Deaths: 2
- Injuries: 8 (Note: 7 by gunfire.)
- Perpetrator: Jaylen Dwayne Edgar
- Motive: Stress
- Verdict: Guilty
- Convictions: First-degree murder (2 counts); Attempted first-degree murder (7 counts)

On November 1, 2024, 17-year-old Jaylen Dwayne Edgar opened fire in downtown Orlando, Florida, United States, during overnight Halloween festivities. Two people were killed, and seven others were injured by gunfire. One other person suffered a non-gunshot injury.

In August 2026, Edgar was found guilty of two counts of first-degree murder and seven counts of attempted first degree murder. Edgar faces a maximum punishment of life in prison, and is scheduled to be sentenced later in October.

== Background ==
Halloween is an annual holiday celebrated by dozens of countries on October 31. Halloween is also typically one of the busiest times in Orlando, with crowds of between 50,000 and 100,000 people. On the night of the shooting, an estimated 75,000 people were downtown when the gunman opened fire.

== Shooting ==
1 Shooting of Hill
2 Shooting of crowd

At 1:07 a.m., Edgar walked south down Orange Avenue past the intersection of Central Boulevard before turning around, pulling a handgun from his waistline and firing a single shot, killing Tyrek Hill. After shooting Hill, Edgar ran east on Central Boulevard before turning north onto Court Street and cutting between multiple commercial businesses as he turned west.

Edgar then arrived at the intersection of Orange Avenue and Washington Street among another large group of people. At 1:11 a.m, Edgar opened fire again, mortally wounding Timothy Schmidt Jr. before continuing to shoot at the crowd, striking seven other people. Nine shell casings were found at the second scene, implying that nine shots were fired there. Edgar then ran a short distance south along Orange Avenue towards two marked police vehicles where he was held at gunpoint by a Orlando Police Department officer before tackling him a few moments later. Edgar and the officer struggled before he was subdued and arrested.

== Victims ==
In total, there were 10 victims of the shooting, including nine by gunshot and one other person after being trampled as people fled the attack. The two deceased people were identified as 25-year-old Tyrek Hill, who was pronounced dead at the scene, and 19-year-old Timothy Schmidt Jr., who succumbed to his injuries in hospital. The surviving victims were treated at Orlando Regional Medical Center.

== Aftermath ==
Surveillance video of the shooting was released by Orlando Police Department Chief of Police Eric Smith and the weapon used in the shooting, a Springfield Armory 9 mm handgun, was recovered by police along with nine shell casings and five bullets.

=== Lawsuit ===
On June 3, 2025, the Haggard law firm representing victims' families plans to sue the city of Orlando, Orlando police, businesses, and organizers for criminal negligence and wrongful death. On October 29, 2025, Haggard Law Firm filed a lawsuit against the City of Orlando and Downtown Power, LLC, the owner of Wall Street Plaza, for criminal negligence.

According to the lawsuit, the city of Orlando and officers and agents of the Orlando Police Department (OPD) committed negligence by neglecting to enforce rules and keep the area safe during the Halloween celebrations and block party in Downtown Orlando. It lists 20 examples of carelessness, such as a lack of monitoring cameras, poor lighting, and insufficient protection. The city spokesperson said they would not comment on the pending lawsuit. According to a statement released by Downtown Power,

"I don't know why we are part of the lawsuit because the incident didn't happen on our property, and it didn't happen inside our permitted area."

== Perpetrator ==
The suspect in the shooting was identified as 17-year-old male teenager Jaylen Dwayne Edgar. Edgar told police after the shooting that he was under stress and witnessed a lot of his "loved ones die". About 30 minutes before the shooting at around 12:40 a.m, he interacted with law enforcement and climbed into the back of an ambulance and laid down on a stretcher before getting into an altercation with a police officer who pulled him out of the ambulance and off the stretcher. The same officer later tackled Edgar to the ground after he opened fire.

=== Charges ===
Edgar was charged with adult murder charges of two counts of second-degree murder and six counts of attempted first-degree murder with a firearm but did not attend his first court appearance, although his mother did instead. Edgar is not eligible to receive the death penalty as he was a minor at the time of the attack, but faces up to life in prison if found guilty on his charges.

Edgar opted to take the case to trial, which was scheduled for January 12, 2026, rather than resolve the case with a plea deal. Prosecutors said that they planned to call around 25 witnesses for the trial, while the defense said that they would not call any witnesses until the sentencing phase if Edgar was found guilty.

On August 24, 2026, Edgar was found guilty by a jury of two counts of first-degree murder and seven counts of attempted first-degree murder. The father of shooting victim Timothy Schmidt Jr. said that he was satisfied with the jury's decision, saying that Edgar's defense "played his cards the way he had them, and he did the best he could with what he had" and that he had "a little doubt in my mind" that the jury would find Edgar guilty of lesser charges. Edgar is planned to be sentenced on October 20, and could receive a maximum sentence of life in prison.

== Reactions ==
Orlando Mayor Buddy Dyer announced a local state of emergency in Orlando's downtown entertainment area, enacted a 1 a.m. curfew in the wake of the shooting, banned alcohol sales after midnight and prompted major security changes for late-night crowds in downtown Orlando. Dyer condemned the shooting, stating “Honestly, I am frustrated to have to stand in front of you all and again, share the news that we have senselessly lost another life due to gun violence”. On November 7, the restrictions were allowed to expire.

== See also ==
- 2023 Ybor City shooting, another mass shooting in Florida during Halloween festivities
- Orlando factory shooting, another mass shooting in Orlando
- Pulse nightclub shooting, the deadliest shooting in Orlando and Florida
