= 2017 Orlando factory shooting =

Mass shooting in Florida, U.S.

Orlando factory shooting
- Location: 28.5798°N 81.2936°W; 2427 North Forsyth Road; Orange County, Florida, U.S.
- Date: June 5, 2017 c. 07:50 – 08:03 EST (UTC-05:00)
- Target: Employees of Fiamma Inc.
- Attack type: Mass shooting, mass murder, murder-suicide
- Weapons: 9mm CZ 82 handgun; 2 knives (unused)
- Deaths: 6 (including the perpetrator)
- Injuries: 0
- Perpetrator: John Robert Neumann Jr.
- Motive: Unknown; possible revenge after being fired

On June 5, 2017, John Robert Neumann Jr., a 45-year-old former employee of Fiamma, killed five former colleagues inside a Fiamma Inc. location near Orlando, Florida, United States, before killing himself. Orange County Mayor Jerry Demings said Neumann did not appear to belong to any kind of subversive or terrorist group, and that he appeared to be a "disgruntled employee".

== Shooting ==
John Robert Neumann let himself into the building at around 7:50 a.m. through a rear entrance, armed with a 9 mm handgun and two knives. Neither of the knives were used in the shooting. Another employee said hello to Neumann as he entered the building, but he did not respond. He then made his way to the front office, where he shot two people. He then went to the break room, where he killed three others. One of his victims was shot eight times. Neumann spared a woman, after pointing his gun at her and telling her to "get out".

He singled out his five victims and shot them in the heads. Neumann then fatally shot himself as deputies responded to the scene. 24 rounds had been fired from the handgun during the shooting. According to an autopsy report, he shot himself in the head, and he was intoxicated at the time of the shooting and his death. Eight other employees who worked at the company and were present during the shooting escaped without injury. About a dozen employees were inside the office at the time. The five victims were Robert Snyder, 69, lead manager at the factory; Brenda Montanez-Crespo, 44; Kevin Clark, 53; Jeffery Roberts, 57; and Kevin Lawson, 46.

== Perpetrator ==
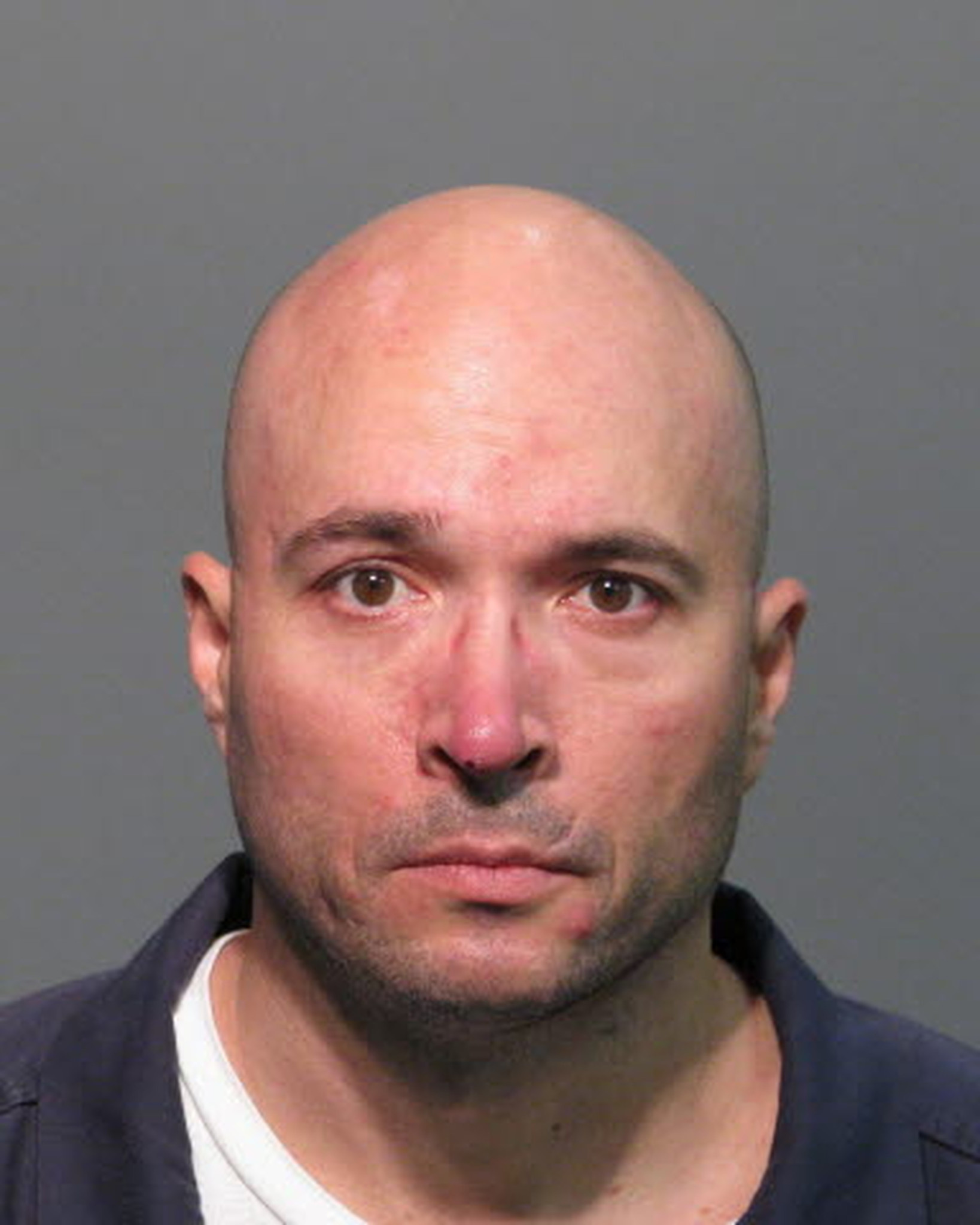
Photograph of Neumann

John Robert Neumann Jr. (May 2, 1972 – June 5, 2017) was born in New York. He joined the U.S. Army in 1991, but received an honorable discharge in 1993 for not meeting the height and weight requirements. While in the army he received the second best sharp shooter rating in while in training. Neumann did not have a concealed weapons permit. He had a history of minor crimes before the shooting, though none were violent, mostly associated with traffic. He was not known to have any kind of mental illness. Neumann's estranged sister stated that he had been emotionally abused by their mother as a child, which had turned him into "an angry person".

Neumann once worked for Fiamma, which made awnings for recreational vehicles and campervans. He was fired in April 2017 for starting fights with people and stealing the business's awnings and selling them on the side. The lead manager who fired him later feared he would return for revenge. Police dealt with him in May 2014 after he was accused of battery against a coworker at the factory, but no charges were filed in that incident.

A neighbor described him as quiet and not particularly social. Orange County Mayor Jerry Demings said Neumann did not appear to belong to any kind of subversive or terrorist group, and that Neumann was a "disgruntled employee".

== Aftermath ==
Two days after the shooting a vigil was held to remember the victims. The father of Kevin Lawson stated that his son had told him he was afraid Neumann would attempt to harm the employees of Fiamma, and that there were rumors something would occur at the location. In the aftermath of the shooting, a local youth sports league raised money for the children of Kevin Clark, who were orphaned, as their mother had died nine years earlier in 2008.

U.S. Senator Bill Nelson stated in response to the shooting that "The city of Orlando, which is still healing from the Pulse massacre, has seen too much violence this past year". The shooting occurred one week before the first anniversary of the Pulse nightclub shooting, which had been the deadliest mass shooting by a lone gunman in U.S. history at the time.

The Governor of Florida, Rick Scott, stated in response to the shooting that "Over the past year, the Orlando community has been challenged like never before", and that "I ask all Floridians to pray for the families impacted by this senseless act of violence". Fiamma Inc. released a statement saying the company was "heartbroken" and asking for "thoughts and prayers" for the victims of the shooting. On the anniversary of the shooting in 2018, the office was closed in remembrance. A member of the Orange County Sheriff's Office later described the shooting as "one of the most difficult things [...] we've seen" and described the violence as "senseless".

== See also ==
- Crime in Florida
- List of mass shootings in the United States
- Pulse nightclub shooting, then the deadliest mass shooting in U.S. history which happened a year earlier nearby
- Workplace violence
