= List of homicides in California =

This is a list of notable homicides in California. This list includes notable homicides committed in the U.S. state of California that have a Wikipedia article on the killing, the killer, or the victim. It is divided into four subject areas as follows:

1. Multiple homicides – homicides having multiple victims, including incidents involving spree killers, acts of terrorism, two mass homicides involving criminal acts causing airline crashes, and a mass suicide directed by a cult leader. The article includes sub-lists for homicides involving school shootings, familicides, and police shootouts.
2. Serial killers – persons who murder three or more persons with the incidents taking place over more than a month and including a significant period of time between them
3. Single homicides – notable homicides involving a single fatality, including homicides involving celebrities as victims or perpetrators
4. Bias homicides – includes attacks directed against Native Americans (a more complete list of those incidents is set forth in the California genocide article), Asian immigrants, members of a religious group, and individuals based on sexual orientation

== Multiple homicides ==
Listed in chronological order

No.	Incident	Location	Date	Deaths	Description	Sources
1	Lexington murders	Lexington	1883-03-11	2	Double murder, two of the perpetrators were hanged	
2	Los Angeles Times bombing	Los Angeles	1910-10-1	21	Union member bombed the Los Angeles Times building	
3	1928 Fairfield murders	Solano County	1928-08-22	11	Mass shooting at former workplace	
4	Adele Ritchie	Laguna Beach	1930-04-24	2	Actress who fatally shot a set designer during an argument before killing herself	
5	New Amsterdam hotel fire	San Francisco	1944-08- 03	22	George Holman set fire to the New Amsterdam hotel, killing 22 people and injuring 27 others. One of the worst mass murders in San Francisco.	
6	Pacific Air Lines Flight 773	Contra Costa County	1964-05-07	44	Pilot of airliner shot during flight causing plane to crash	
7	1965 Highway 101 sniper attack	Orcutt	1965-04-25	4	16-year-old youth opened fire on cars traveling along the 101 freeway	
8	Tate–LaBianca murders	Los Angeles	1969-08-08/10	8	Murders perpetrated by members of the Manson Family, victims included actress Sharon Tate	
9	1973 South Los Angeles shootings	Los Angeles	1973-04-22	7	Spree shootings at gas stations and private residences	
10	1974 Los Angeles International Airport bombing	Los Angeles	1974-08-06	3	Bombing by Yugoslavian immigrant in Pan Am's international terminal killed three and injured 36	
11	Golden Dragon massacre	San Francisco	1977-09-04	5	Gang-related shooting at Chinese restaurant	
12	Robert Alton Harris	San Diego	1978-07-05	2	Murdered two teenagers eating cheeseburgers in a supermarket parking lot; executed in 1992, first person executed in California since 1967	
13	Assassinations of George Moscone and Harvey Milk	San Francisco	1978-11-27	2	San Francisco Supervisor Dan White shot Mayor George Moscone and Supervisor Harvey Milk	
14	Keddie murders	Keddie	1981-04-11	4	Unsolved quadruple homicide of one woman and three children at the Keddie Resort	
15	Wonderland murders	Laurel Canyon	1981-07-01	4	Unsolved murder of four persons at a drug house, also known as the "Laurel Canyon Murders"	
16	San Ysidro McDonald's massacre	San Ysidro	1984-07-18	23	Mass shooting at McDonald's restaurant	
17	Pacific Southwest Airlines Flight 1771	San Luis Obispo County	1987-12-07	43	Plane crashed after being hijacked	
18	Sunnyvale ESL shooting	Sunnyvale	1988-02-16	7	Workplace shooting at ESL Incorporated	
19	1991 Sacramento hostage crisis	Sacramento	1991-04-04	6	Hostage crisis at Good Guys store in Florin Mall, 40 hostages held at gunpoint	
20	1992 San Luis Obispo County shootings	Morro Bay/Paso Robles	1992-11-07	7	Spree killing at two homes and a card club	
21	101 California Street shooting	San Francisco	1993-07-01	9	Mass shooting at offices of Petit & Martin law firm	
22	1993 Oxnard unemployment office shooting	Oxnard	1993-12-2	4	Mass shooting at a Employment Development Department (EDD) office	
23	Murder of Nicole Brown Simpson and Ron Goldman	Los Angeles	1994-06-12	2	Unsolved murder of Nicole Brown Simpson and Ron Goldman. O. J. Simpson tried and acquitted	
24	Heaven's Gate	Rancho Santa Fe	1997-03-26	39	Mass suicide by cult members at direction of cult leader	
25	Black Widow Murders	Los Angeles	1999, 2005	2	Two elderly women convicted of murdering two vagrants in 1999 and the second in 2005	
26	Glen Helzer	Concord	2000	5	Former leader of the "Children of Thunder" cult murdered five people as part of an extortion plot	
27	2001 Nevada County shootings	Nevada County	2001-01-10	3	Shooting spree by 40-year-old man with semi-automatic pistol	
28	2002 Los Angeles International Airport shooting	Los Angeles	2002-07-04	3	Gunman opened fire at ticket counter of El Al, Israel's national airline	
29	Murder of Jason Allen and Lindsay Cutshall	Jenner	2004-08-14	2	Young Midwestern couple shot as they slept on a Sonoma Coast beach	
30	2005 Glendale train crash	Los Angeles	2005-01-26	11	Suicidal man parked on tracks and caused crash of Metrolink commuter train	
31	2006 Goleta postal facility shooting	Santa Barbara/Goleta	2006-01-30	8	Spree shooting by former postal worker	
32	Murders of Jan Pietrzak and Quiana Jenkins-Pietrzak	Riverside County	2008-10-15	2	Married couple tortured, sexually assaulted and shot by four Marines	
33	SiPort shooting	Santa Clara	2008-11-14	3	Former employee returned to workplace and shot the CEO and two other executives in the head	
34	Daniel Wozniak	Los Alamitos	2010-05-21	2	Struggling actor murdered soldier to steal his combat pay and then murdered a friend of the soldier to make it appear the soldier killed her and then disappeared	
35	2011 Seal Beach shooting	Seal Beach	2011-10-12	8	Mass shooting at a hair salon, deadliest mass shooting in Orange County history	
36	Southern California Edison shooting	Irwindale	2011-12-16	3	Workplace shooting	
37	Lei family murders	San Francisco	2012-03-23	5	Murder of Chinese immigrant family	
38	Murders of Ming Qu and Ying Wu	Los Angeles	2012-04-11	2	Chinese graduate students at USC shot to death while sitting in their car near campus	
39	Murders of Claudia Maupin and Oliver Northup	Davis	2013-04-14	2	Torture, mutilation and murder of elderly couple in their home, perpetrator a 15-year-old psychopath	
40	2015 San Bernardino attack	San Bernardino	2015-12-02	16	Terrorist attack by Muslim couple on public health department Christmas party	
41	San Francisco UPS shooting	San Francisco	2017-06-14	4	Workplace shooting at UPS facility	
42	Rancho Tehama shootings	Rancho Tehama	2017-11-13	6	Shooting spree in which five were killed and 18 injured at 8 crime scenes	
43	Yountville shooting	Yountville	2018-03-08	5	Murder-suicide shooting at Veterans Home of California	
44	Thousand Oaks shooting	Thousand Oaks	2018-11-07	13	Mass shooting at Borderline Bar and Grill	
45	2019 Gilroy Garlic Festival shooting	Gilroy	2019-07-28	4	Mass shooting at food festival	
46	Orinda shooting	Orinda	2019-10-31	5	Mass shooting during a house party	
47	2019 Fresno shooting	Fresno	2019-11-17	4	Mass shooting at football watch party	
48	Aguanga shooting	Aguanga	2020-09-07	7	Mass murder at residence used to grow illegal marijuana	
49	2021 Orange, California office shooting	Orange	2021-03-31	4	Shooting at office building	
50	2021 San Jose shooting	San Jose	2021-05-26	10	Mass shooting at transit rail yard	
51	2022 Sacramento shooting	Sacramento	2022-04-03	6	Mass shooting by multiple shooters in downtown Sacramento	
52	2023 Goshen shooting	Goshen	2023-01-16	6	Execution-style killing of six persons, including a 10-month-old baby at a house where a search warrant had been executed one week earlier as part of a drug investigation	
53	2023 Monterey Park shooting	Monterey Park	2023-01-21	12	Mass shooting at a dance studio during Lunar New Year celebration	
54	2023 Half Moon Bay shootings	Half Moon Bay	2023-01-23	7	Workplace shooting at two farms	

=== School shootings ===
Listed in chronological order

No.	Incident	Location	Date	Deaths	Description	Sources
1	1976 California State University, Fullerton massacre	Fullerton	1976-07-12	7	School shooting perpetrated by university custodian	
2	Cleveland Elementary School shooting (San Diego)	San Diego	1979-01-29	2	16-year-old girl fired at neighboring school from a window	
3	Stockton schoolyard shooting	Stockton	1989-01-17	5	School shooting in an elementary school yard	
4	1992 Lindhurst High School shooting	Olivehurst	1992-05-01	4	School shooting perpetrated by former student	
5	1996 San Diego State University shooting	San Diego	1996-08-15	3	Graduate student shot and killed three professors at engineering building	
6	Costa Mesa school car attack	Costa Mesa	1999-05-03	2	Man drove his Cadillac into preschool playground and opened fire, killing two and wounding five	
7	2001 Isla Vista killings	Isla Vista	2001-02-23	5	Vehicular homicide and assault near UCSB campus, perpetrator was son of director Dan Attias	
8	2001 Santana High School shooting	Santee	2001-03-05	2	School shooting perpetrated by 15-year-old student	
9	2012 Oikos University shooting	Oakland	2012-04-02	7	Mass shooting at Korean Christian college	
10	2013 Santa Monica shootings	Santa Monica	2013-06-07	6	Spree shooting at Santa Monica College campus following domestic dispute and house fire	
11	2014 Isla Vista attacks	Isla Vista	2014-05-23	7	Perpetrator conducted vehicular homicide and murder with knives in Isla Vista (close to UCSB), killing six UCSB students and himself. Perpetrator was son of director Peter Rodger.	
12	2016 UCLA shooting	Los Angeles	2016-06-01	3	Unsuccessful Ph.D. student shot his thesis adviser, his estranged wife, and himself	
13	2017 North Park Elementary School shooting	San Bernardino	2017-04-10	3	Man shot his estranged wife at the school where she worked and a student standing behind her and then killed himself	
14	Saugus High School shooting	Santa Clarita	2019-11-14	3	Student age 16 shot five schoolmates, killed two, then killed himself	
15	Union City, California elementary school double murder	Union City, California	2019-11-20	2	Boys ages 11 and 14 shot in school parking lot by two gang members	

=== Familicides ===
Listed in chronological order

No.	Incident	Location	Date	Deaths	Description	Sources
1	McGlincy murders	Campbell	1896-05-26	6	Married couple, their two adult children, and two servants are killed by their estranged son-in-law	
2	George Hassell	Whittier	1917, 1926	13	Spree killer, killed his wife and three children in Whittier, then killed his second family in Texas in 1926	
3	Ralph Works	Pasadena	1941-08-08	2	Murder-suicide in which former professional baseball pitcher shot himself and his wife	
4	Barbecue murders	Terra Linda	1975-06-21	2	Married couple murdered in their home by adopted daughter and her boyfriend who attempted to dispose of bodies by burning in a barbecue pit	
5	Judith Barsi	Canoga Park	1988-07-25	3	Murder suicide in which father killed his 10-year-old actress-daughter and his wife	
6	Ramon Salcido	Sonoma/Cotati	1989-04-14	7	Spree killer of six family members and workplace supervisor	
7	Lyle and Erik Menendez	Beverly Hills	1989-08-20	2	Shotgun murders of José and Mary Louise ("Kitty") Menendez by their sons	
8	Betty Broderick	San Diego	1989-11-05	2	Convicted of murdering her ex-husband and second wife, later depicted in A Woman Scorned: The Betty Broderick Story	
9	Dana Ewell	Fresno	1992-04-19	3	Ordered the killing of his father, mother and sister	
10	Avanesian family massacre	Glendale	1996-02-06	7	An Iranian immigrant sets fire to his entire family, killing his wife and six children in Glendale’s worst arson murder.	
11	Nikolay Soltys	Sacramento	2001-08-20-21	7	Murdered his family including his unborn child.	
12	Marcus Wesson	Fresno	2004-03-12	9	Father murdered his family	
13	Williams family murders	Rowland Heights	2007-08-07	3	Manling Williams murders her family wanting to start a new life. She is sentenced to death.	
14	Covina massacre	Covina	2008-12-24	10	Christmas Eve shooting by family member	
15	Hart family murders	Mendocino County	2018-03-26	8	Murder-suicide in which white lesbian couple murdered their six adopted black children and killed themselves	

=== Police shootouts and killings ===
Listed in chronological order

No.	Incident	Location	Date	Deaths	Description	Sources
1	Walter H. Auble	Los Angeles	1908-09-09	1	Police chief of Los Angeles shot and killed by a burglary suspect while trying to make an arrest	
2	September 1937 Folsom escape attempt	Folsom	1937-09-19	5	Attempted prison escape in which the warden, two guards, and two prisoners were killed; five others involved in the attempt were executed	
3	The Onion Field	Los Angeles	1963-03-09	1	Kidnapping and murder of LAPD officer, later a book by Joseph Wambaugh	
4	Murders of Theodore L. Newton Jr. and George F. Azrak	Anza	1967-06-17	2	Two Border Patrol agents kidnapped and murdered by marijuana smugglers	
5	Marin County Civic Center attacks	San Rafael	1970-08-07	4	Kidnapping of judge followed by shootout with police, led to manhunt for Angela Davis	
6	Newhall incident	Valencia	1970-04-05	5	Shootout in which four California Highway Patrol officers were killed, deadliest day in California law enforcement history	
7	Symbionese Liberation Army shootout	Los Angeles	1974-05-17	6	Members of the group shot or burned in South LA house during shootout with LAPD	
8	Norco shootout	Norco	1980-05-09	3	Shootout between five heavily armed bank robbers and sheriff deputies, one officer and two perpetrators killed; eight other officers, a civilian, and two perpetrators injured	
9	North Hollywood shootout	North Hollywood	1997-02-28	2	Shootout between police and bank robbers wearing body armor, both bank robbers killed	
10	Kevin Gaines	Los Angeles	1997-03-18	1	Police officer who also worked security for Death Row Records and was living with Suge Knight's estranged wife was shot by an undercover LAPD detective	
11	Stevenson Ranch shootout	Stevenson Ranch	2001-08-31	2	Shootout resulting in deaths of a convicted felon and a sheriff's deputy	
12	2009 shootings of Oakland police officers	Oakland	2009-03-21	5	Wanted felon shot two officers during a traffic stop, then shot and killed two SWAT officers	
13	Christopher Dorner shootings and manhunt	Southern California	2013-02	5	After being fired, former LAPD officer killed two civilians and two law enforcement, manhunt ended in shootout at cabin in Big Bear	
14	2013 shooting of Santa Cruz police officers	Santa Cruz	2013-02-26	3	Two police officers shot and killed, perpetrator then killed in shootout with police	
15	Luis Bracamontes	Sacramento	2014-10-24	2	Undocumented immigrant opened fire on sheriff's deputies, killing two; Donald Trump ran an ad blaming Democrats for the murders	
16	2020 boogaloo murders	Oakland; Ben Lomond	2020-05-29; 2020-06-06	2	Two ambush-style attacks occurred against security personnel and law enforcement officers in California. The attacks left two dead and injured three others.	

== Serial killers ==
Listed in chronological order by date of earliest homicide

No.	Incident	Location	Date	Deaths	Description	Sources
1	Earle Nelson	California, Oregon +	1926–1927	22–29	Known as the "Gorilla Man", the first serial killer in USA to receive widespread media attention	
2	Wineville Chicken Coop murders, Gordon Stewart Northcott	Wineville	1926–1928	3+	Series of abductions and murders committed by a 19-year-old farmer, his mother, and his nephew	
3	Stephen A. Nash	Various locations in California, including Los Angeles	1955–1956	5–11	Murdered five to 11 men and boys.	
4	Bouncing Ball Killer	Los Angeles	1959–1960	6–7+	Serial killer also known as the Rubber Ball Strangler	
5	Patrick Kearney	Southern California	1962–1977	21–43	Serial killer and child molester, a list of men believed to be victims was found in his trunk	
6	Zodiac Killer	San Francisco	1968–1969	5–37	Killed three couples and a cab driver and wrote 15 letter to local newspapers, including cryptograms and clues	
7	Rodney Alcala	California	1968–1979	8+	Serial killer sometimes known as "The Dating Game Killer" because he won an episode of The Dating Game television show	
8	Samuel Little	19 states	1970–2005	60–93	Confessed to murdering 93 women, most prolific serial killer in U.S. history	
9	Juan Corona	Sutter County	1971	25+	Mexican serial killer who was convicted of the murders of 25 migrant farm workers found buried in shallow graves in peach orchards along the Feather River in Sutter County	
10	Randy Kraft	Southern California	1971–1983	16–67	Known as the "Scorecard Killer", raped and murdered at least 16 young men	
11	Santa Rosa hitchhiker murders	North Bay	1972–1973	7+	Female hitchhikers found nude in rural areas of Sonoma and Santa Rosa Counties	
12	Zebra murders	San Francisco	1973–1974	15–73+	Racially-motivated attacks by a group of four black serial killers	
13	Doodler	San Francisco	1974–1975	6–16	Unidentified serial killer who sketched his male victims before having sex with and killing them	
14	Joseph James DeAngelo	California	1974–1986	13	Serial killer and rapist	
15	William Suff	Lake Elsinore	1974–1992	13+	Serial killer known as "The Riverside Prostitute Killer" and "The Lake Elsinore Killer"	
16	Gypsy Hill killings	San Mateo County	1976	5+	Homicides of young women and girls by a suspected serial killer known in media as the "San Mateo Slasher"	
17	Steven David Catlin	Bakersfield, Fresno	1976–1984	3	Convicted of murdering two wives and his adoptive mother	
18	Hillside Strangler	Los Angeles	1977–1978	12	Serial killers later identified as cousins Kenneth Bianchi and Angelo Buono Jr.	
19	Roger Kibbe	Sacramento	1977–1987	8+	Serial killer and rapist known as the "I-5 Strangler"	
20	Joseph Naso	Northern California	1977–1994	6–10	Serial killer and rapist	
21	Richard Trenton Chase	Sacramento	1977–1978	6	Serial killer, necrophile, and cannibal that murdered 6 men, women, and children at random in a month long killing spree	
22	Skid Row Stabber	Los Angeles	1978–1979	12	Unsolved murders of homeless people	
23	Gerald and Charlene Gallego	Sacramento	1978–1980	10	Serial killers who kidnapped and murder teenagers after keeping as sex slaves	
24	Joseph Edward Duncan	California, Idaho	1978–2005	5–8	Convicted serial killer and child molester	
25	Terry Peder Rasmussen	California, New Hampshire	1978–2002	6+	Serial killer sometimes known as "Bob Evans" and "The Chameleon Killer"	
26	Lawrence Bittaker and Roy Norris	Southern California	1979	5	Known as the "Tool Box Killers", murdered and raped five teenage girls	
27	William Bonin	Southern California	1979–1980	21–36+	Serial killer, pederast and sex offender who committed the rape, torture, and murder of a minimum of 21 young men and boys	
28	David Carpenter	San Francisco	1979–1981	8–10+	Serial killer known for stalking and killing victims in state parks near San Francisco, also known as the Trailside Killer	
29	Doug Clark (serial killer)	Los Angeles	1980	6+	Serial killer with accomplice Carol Bundy known as the "Sunset Strip Killers"	
30	David Mason	Oakland	1980	5–6	Serial killer killed at least four elderly people; executed in 1993	
31	Dorothea Puente	Sacramento	1982–1988	9	Ran a boarding house and murdered elderly and mentally disabled boarders before cashing their Social Security checks	
32	Leonard Lake and Charles Ng	Calaveras County	1983–1985	11–25	Ex-Marine who had a cabin that he described as a "dungeon" where he kidnapped, raped, and murdered women	
33	Speed Freak Killers	San Joaquin County	1984–1999	4–19	Methamphetamine users convicted of four murders	
34	Grim Sleeper	Los Angeles	1984–2007	10–25+	Serial killer who received nickname when he appeared to have taken a 14-year break from his crimes, from 1988 to 2002	
35	Richard Ramirez	Los Angeles, San Gabriel Valley	1984–1985	13	Serial killer known as the "Night Stalker"	
36	Michael Hughes (serial killer)	California	1986–1993	7+	Former security guard who killed women living or working on the streets	
37	Joseph Danks	Los Angeles	1986–1990	7	Murdered 6 homeless men in a month long killing spree, and strangled his cellmate after being convicted	<ref"Man Gets Death Sentence for Killing Cellmate". Los Angeles Times. Apr 4, 1993.</ref>
38	Chester Turner	Los Angeles	1987–1998	15+	Convicted of murdering 10 women; another man was earlier wrongfully convicted for his crimes	
39	Efren Saldivar	Glendale	1988–1998	6–200+	Respiratory therapist at Adventist Health Glendale, killed patients by injecting a paralytic drug inducing cardiac and respiratory arrest, known as Angel of Death	
40	Keith Hunter Jesperson	California, Oregon	1990–1995	8–185	Known as the "Happy Face Killer" because he drew smiley faces on his many letters to the media and authorities	
41	Michael Gargiulo	Southern California	1993–2008	3–10	Serial killer known as The Hollywood Ripper	
42	Wayne Adam Ford	California	1997–1998	4+	Long-haul driver murdered and dismembered three sex workers and a hitchhiker	
43	Pittsburg serial murders	Pittsburg	1998–1999	5	Killings of one man and four women, some of the victims either engaged in prostitution or were drug addicts	
44	Cary Stayner	Mariposa County	1999	4	Serial killer who killed women near Yosemite	

== Single homicides ==
Listed in chronological order

No.	Incident	Location	Date	Description	Sources
1	Virginia Rappe	San Francisco	1921-09-09	Silent film actress, comedian Roscoe Arbuckle tried and acquitted of manslaughter	
2	William Desmond Taylor	Los Angeles	1922-02-01	Director of 59 silent films shot in the back at his apartment, unsolved, subject of frenzy of sensationalist press coverage	
3	Murder of Marion Parker	Los Angeles	1927-12-17	12-year-old girl abducted and murdered, billed as "the most horrible crime of the 1920s" by the Los Angeles Times	
4	Murder of Brooke Hart and the lynching of Thomas Harold Thurmond and John M. Holmes	San Jose	1933-11-09	Son of department store owner kidnapped and murdered, perpetrators then lynched	
5	Sleepy Lagoon murder	Commerce	1942-08-02	Murder of José Gallardo Díaz, who was discovered unconscious and dying near a swimming hole	
6	Black Dahlia	Los Angeles	1947-01-14	Unsolved murder and mutilation of 22-year-old woman	
7	Bugsy Siegel	Beverly Hills	1947-06-20	Mobster murdered in his Beverly Hills home, shot through window with .30 caliber military M1 carbine	
8	Barbara Graham	Burbank	1953-03-09	Murdered widow Mabel Monohan in home burglary; Graham later depicted in I Want to Live!	
9	Killing of Johnny Stompanato	Beverly Hills	1958-04-04	Murder of Lana Turner's boyfriend by Turner's 14-year-old daughter Cheryl Crane	
10	Elizabeth Ann Duncan	Ventura	1958	Woman hired hitman to kill her daughter-in-law; last woman executed in California	
11	Carl "Alfalfa" Switzer	Mission Hills	1959-01-21	Former child star shot and killed trying to collect a $50 debt	
12	Karyn Kupcinet	West Hollywood	1963-11-28	Actress murdered six days after assassination of President Kennedy, prompting John F. Kennedy assassination conspiracy theories	
13	Sam Cooke	South Central Los Angeles	1964-12-11	R&B singer shot and killed by motel manager	
14	Murder of Cheri Jo Bates	Riverside	1966-10-30	18-year-old college freshman stabbed and slashed to death on grounds of Riverside City College	
15	Assassination of Robert F. Kennedy	Los Angeles	1968-06-05	Assassination at the Ambassador Hotel by Palestinian Sirhan Sirhan after Kennedy campaigned his speech in the California primary. Kennedy died 25 hours after the assassination	
16	Ramon Novarro	Laurel Canyon	1968-10-30	Actor murdered by brothers hired for sexual services	
17	Killing of Meredith Hunter	Alameda County	1969-10-24	Killed by members of Hells Angels during Altamont Free Concert by The Rolling Stones	
18	Marcus Foster	Oakland	1973-11-06	Superintendent of Oakland school district assassinated by the Symbionese Liberation Army	
19	Murder of Arlis Perry	Stanford	1974-10-12	Newlywed murdered inside Stanford Memorial Church, solved 40 years later with DNA evidence	
20	Murder of Betty Van Patter	San Francisco	1974-12-13	Bookkeeper for Black Panther Party was beaten to death, unsolved, she had reportedly threatened to make public her discovery that the party doctored its books	
21	Sal Mineo	West Hollywood	1976-02-12	Actor stabbed in the heart by a mugger	
22	Danny Lockin	Anaheim	1977-08-21	Actor stabbed over 100 times by man he met in a gay bar	
23	Murder of Mary Quigley	Santa Clara	1977-09-10	High school senior attended a beer party and was discovered the next day hanging from a chain-link fence in a park near the site of the party, case solved 30 years later with DNA evidence	
24	Glen Stewart Godwin	Palm Springs	1980	Murdered drug dealer Kim LeValley, stabbing him 26 times, later escaped from prison and was on FBI's 10 most wanted list	
25	Murder of Suzanne Bombardier	Antioch	1980-06-22	14-year-old honor roll student raped and murdered by a convicted sex offender and dumped in the San Joaquin River	
26	Dorothy Stratten	Los Angeles	1980-08-14	Playboy Playmate and actress murdered by her estranged husband and manager Paul Snider	
27	Death of Susan Louise Jordan	Riverside	1980-10-28	15-year-old girl abducted and dragged to an orange grove where she was raped and strangled	
28	Killing of Dominique Dunne	Los Angeles	1982-10-30	Actress murdered by ex-boyfriend John Sweeney. Dunne died five days later	
29	Killing of Marvin Gaye	Los Angeles	1984-04-01	Shot and killed in an altercation with his father	
30	Killing of Bibi Lee	Oakland	1984-11-04	UC Berkeley student killed by her boyfriend	
31	Herb Wallerstein	Los Angeles	1985-09-27	Television director and producer was killed with a baseball bat by his Salvadoran housekeeper, she was found not guilty in light of testimony of physical abuse by Wallerstein	
32	Murder of Michele Avila	Los Angeles	1985-10-01	Murder of 17-year-old girl by her former best friends and rivals	
33	Murder of Sherri Rasmussen	Van Nuys	1986-02-24	Woman beaten and shot by female LAPD officer	
34	Death of Dag Drollet	Los Angeles	1987-05-16	Shooting of Cheyenne Brando's boyfriend by her brother Christian Brando, who pleaded guilty to voluntary manslaughter	
35	Rebecca Schaeffer	Los Angeles	1989-07-18	Murdered at the door of her apartment by an obsessed fan/stalker Robert John Bardo, while awaiting a script from The Godfather Part III to be delivered	
36	Huey P. Newton	Oakland	1989-08-22	Murdered on the streets of Oakland	
37	William Arnold Newton	West Hollywood	1990-10-29	Gay pornographic actor (stage name Billy London) murdered and placed in dumpster with head and feet in plastic bags	
38	Killing of Latasha Harlins	South Central Los Angeles	1991-03-16	Fatal shooting of 15-year-old African-American girl by Korean-American convenience store owner	
39	Murder of Lea Mek	El Monte	1993-12-03	Cambodian refugee and gang member killed in a gang shooting in a pool hall, incident triggered a chain reaction of gang violence	
40	Murder of Polly Klaas	Petaluma	1993-10-01	12-year-old kidnapped during a slumber party and later strangled by Richard Allen Davis	
41	Sara Kruzan	Riverside	1994-03-09	Sexually trafficked at age 16, she shot and killed the surrogate father who was trafficking her, later became an anti-trafficking activist	
42	Murder of Stephanie Kuhen	Los Angeles	1995-09-17	Three-year-old girl killed by gang gunfire; President Bill Clinton condemned the incident and promised funding to fight gangs	
43	Haing S. Ngor	Los Angeles	1996-02-25	Academy Award winning actor (The Killing Fields) murdered by Oriental Lazy Boyz gang in robbery outside his house	
44	Murder of Ennis Cosby	Los Angeles	1997-01-16	Son of Bill Cosby shot in the head in robbery attempt at the Mulholland exit to the 405 freeway	
45	Murder of the Notorious B.I.G.	Los Angeles	1997-03-09	Murder of rapper in drive-by shooting	
46	Phil Hartman	Encino	1998-05-27	Actor/comedian shot by his wife as he slept	
47	Murder of Michelle O'Keefe	Palmdale	2000-02-22	18-year-old aspiring actress murdered on way home from shooting a Kid Rock video, featured on America's Most Wanted and Dateline NBC	
48	Bonny Lee Bakley	Los Angeles	2001-05-04	Wife of actor Robert Blake shot and killed in parked car at restaurant, Blake was tried and found not guilty	
49	Murder of Samantha Runnion	Stanton	2002-07-15	Five-year-old girl abducted from her home and murdered	
50	Murder of Laci Peterson	Modesto	2002-12-24	Murder of pregnant woman by her husband	
51	Murder of Lana Clarkson	Alhambra	2003-02-03	Murder of actress by record producer Phil Spector	
52	Murder of Yetunde Price	Compton	2003-09-14	Half-sister and personal assistant to Venus and Serena Williams killed in gang shooting in Compton	
53	Tara Correa-McMullen	Inglewood	2005-10-21	Actress who played gang member Graciela on TV series Judging Amy shot in front of an apartment complex	
54	Murder of Chauncey Bailey	Oakland	2007-08-02	Journalist shot by member of a crime syndicate he was investigating for a story	
55	Murder of Jamiel Shaw II	Los Angeles	2008-03-02	17-year-old high school player shot by two Hispanic men while returning home from Beverly Center	
56	Murder of Sandra Cantu	Tracy	2009-03-27	Former Sunday school teacher kidnapped, raped, and murdered eight-year-old girl	
57	Death of Michael Jackson	Los Angeles	2009-06-25	Physician Conrad Murray found guilty of involuntary manslaughter for improperly administering the anesthetic drug propofol	
58	Ronni Chasen	Beverly Hills	2010-11-16	Hollywood publicist shot and killed while driving home as part of a random robbery	
59	Murder of Jeff Hall	Riverside	2011-05-01	Leader of neo-Nazis shot to death by his 10-year-old son	
60	Murder of Michelle Le	Hayward	2011-05-27	Nursing student murdered by a woman who believed Le had an affair with her boyfriend	
62	Murder of Gabriel Fernandez	Palmdale	2013-05-24	Eight-year-old boy beaten to death by mother and her boyfriend, long history of abuse overlooked by county child protective services, depicted in the Netflix series, The Trials of Gabriel Fernandez	
63	Suge Knight	Compton	2015-01-29	Convicted of voluntary manslaughter for crashing car into and killing Terry Carter and injuring a second man	
64	Murder of Madyson Middleton	Santa Cruz	2015-07-25	8-year-old girl lured into another apartment where she was strangled and placed in a dumpster by a 15-year-old boy	
65	Nipsey Hussle	Los Angeles	2019-03-31	Rapper shot at least 10 times in parking lot of a clothing store, two others wounded	
66	Murder of Brianna Kupfer	Los Angeles	2022-01-13	24-year-old University of California, Los Angeles student stabbed and murdered by a 31-year-old man with an extensive criminal record.	
67	2022 Laguna Woods shooting	Laguna Woods	2022-05-15	Mass shooting at Geneva Presbyterian Church, five injured, one killed	

== Bias homicides ==
Listed in chronological order. NOTE: A more complete list of killings of indigenous peoples of California during the California Indian Wars is presented in the article on California genocide.

No.	Incident	Location	Date	Deaths	Description	Sources
1	Sacramento River massacre	Upper Sacramento Valley	1846-04-05	120–700	Mass shooting of Wintu people on banks of Sacramento River, perpetrated by soldiers led by John C. Frémont	
2	Sutter Buttes massacre	Sutter Buttes	1846-06		Murder of California Indians by militarized expeditionary band led by John C. Frémont, estimated Native American deaths range from several hundred to several thousand	
3	Bridge Gulch massacre	Trinity County	1852	150	Massacre of Wintu people in retaliation for killing of Col. John Anderson	
4	Yontoket massacre	Yontocket	1853	400–500	Massacre of Tolowa people in northwestern California	
5	Mendocino War	Mendocino County	1859–1860	283+	White settlers known as the "Eel River Rangers" killed at least 283 Indian men	
6	1860 Wiyot massacre	Humboldt County	1860	80–250	Massacre of Wiyot people by white settlers	
7	Los Angeles Chinese massacre of 1871	Los Angeles	1871-10-24	19	Racial massacre targeting Chinese immigrants	
8	San Francisco riot of 1877	San Francisco	1877-07-23/25	4	Three-day pogrom against Chinese immigrants	
9	Trout Creek Outrage	Truckee	1876-06-17/18	1	Anti-Chinese violence in which cabins housing Chinese immigrants were set on fire and shot fired as they fled, killing one and wounding another	
10	Los Angeles Jewish Community Center shooting	Granada Hills, Los Angeles	1999-08-10	1	White supremacist opened fire with an Uzi at the North Valley Jewish Community Center, killing one and injuring four	
11	Murder of Gwen Araujo	Newark	2002-10-04	1	Teenager beaten and murdered by four men with whom she had been sexually intimate after discovering she was transgender	
12	Murder of Larry King	Oxnard	2008-02-14	1	15-year-old student shot twice by fellow student, a gay-bias crime, later the subject of the HBO documentary Valentine Road	
13	2017 Fresno shootings	Fresno	2017-04-13/18	4	Shooting spree aimed at whites by alleged black supremacist	
14	Killing of Anthony Avalos	Lancaster	2018-06-21	1	Mother and her boyfriend beat to death her 10-year-old son, allegedly due to belief that he was gay	
15	2019 Poway synagogue shooting	Poway	2019-04-27	1	Shooting at Chabad center during Passover holiday, three injured	
16	Killing of Vicha Ratanapakdee	San Francisco	2021-01-28	1	84-year-old Thai American killed by being pushed to the ground during wave of anti-Asian violence during COVID-19 pandemic	

== See also ==
- California genocide
- List of shootings in California
- List of people executed in California
- List of violent incidents at the Cecil Hotel
