= List of 2012 murders in the United States =

List of 2012 murders in the United States:

Murder	Date	No. of victims	Location	Note
2012 Waller Killings	March 20	3	Waller, Texas	Trey Selser murdered his parents in anticipation of committing a shooting at Waller High School though this plan would never be executed.
2012 Ingleside, San Francisco homicide	March 23	5	San Francisco, California	
2012 Oikos University shooting	April 2	7	Oakland, California	
Murder of Ming Qu and Ying Wu	April 11	2	University of Southern California	
2012 Bain murder-kidnappings	April 27	2	Whiteville, Tennessee	
Murder of Kujoe Bonsafo Agyei-Kodie	May	1	Maryland	
Lil Phat	June 7	1	Sandy Springs, Georgia	
Murder of Skylar Neese	July 6	1	Star City, West Virginia	
2012 Aurora, Colorado shooting	July 20	12	Aurora, Colorado	
Wisconsin Sikh temple shooting	August 5	7	Oak Creek, Wisconsin	
2012 College Station, Texas shooting	August 13	2	College Station, Texas	
2012 Empire State Building shooting	August 24	1	New York City	
Faith Hedgepeth homicide	September 7	1	Chapel Hill, North Carolina	
Minneapolis firm shooting	September 27	6	Minneapolis, Minnesota	
Killings of Lucia and Leo Krim	October 25	2	New York City	
Byron David Smith killings	November 22	2	Little Falls, Minnesota	Two teens, 17 and 18, invaded the home of Byron David Smith. His actions allegedly went beyond those allowed by castle doctrine.
Clackamas Town Center shooting	December 11	2	Happy Valley, Oregon	
Sandy Hook Elementary School shooting	December 14	27	Newtown, Connecticut	
2012 Webster shooting	December 24	3	Webster, New York	
