= Richard J. Donovan Correctional Facility =

Prison near San Diego, California

Richard J. Donovan Correctional Facility (RJD)
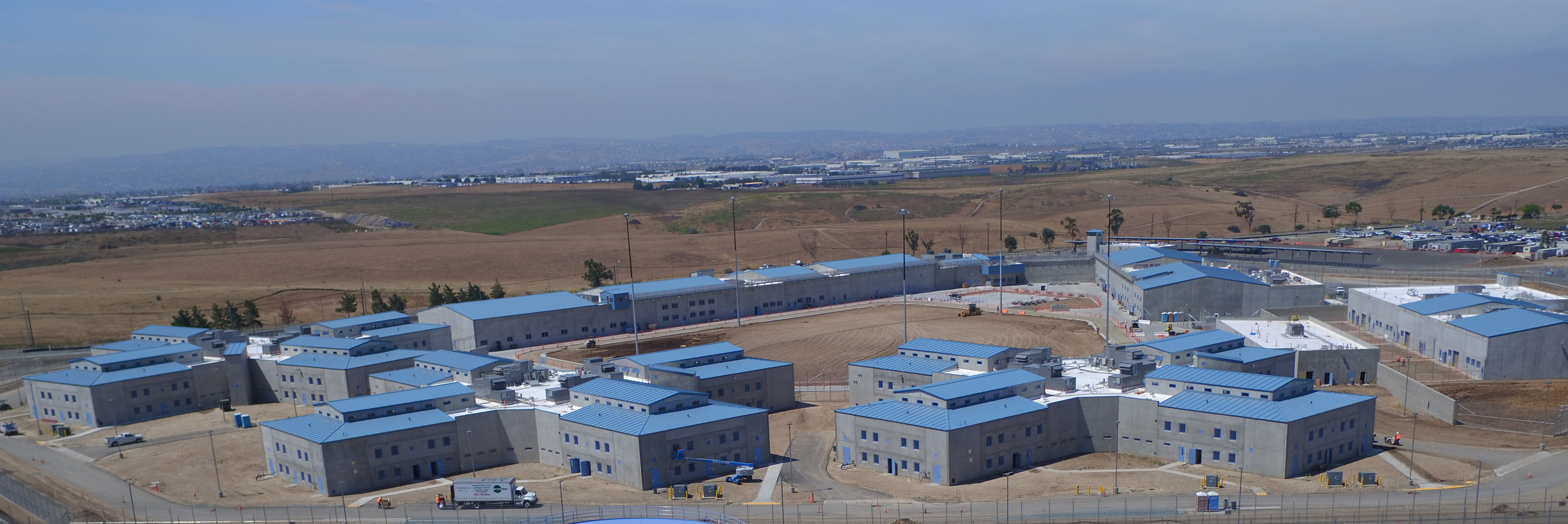
- Interactive map of Richard J. Donovan Correctional Facility (RJD)
- Location: San Diego County, California, United States near Otay Mesa; 32.5846°N 116.9334°W
- Status: Operational
- Security class: Medium – Maximum
- Capacity: 2,992
- Population: 2,920 (97.6% capacity) (January 31, 2023)
- Opened: July 1987
- Managed by: California Department of Corrections and Rehabilitation
- Warden: James S. Hill

Richard J. Donovan Correctional Facility (RJD) is a California state prison in unincorporated southern San Diego County, California, near San Diego. It is operated by the California Department of Corrections and Rehabilitation. The facility sits on 780 acres (320 ha). It is the only state prison in San Diego County. It is named for American politician Richard J. Donovan.

The prison is situated on a mesa about 1.5 miles (2.4 km) from the Mexico–United States border, in the foothills of Otay Mesa overlooking the border. The Otay Mesa site is shared with six other properties related to law enforcement:

- Otay Mesa Detention Center, a federal prison privately operated by CoreCivic
- George Bailey Detention Facility (San Diego County)
- East Mesa Reentry Facility (San Diego County)
- Rock Mountain Detention Facility (San Diego County)
- East Mesa Juvenile Detention Facility (San Diego County)
- A multi-jurisdictional law enforcement firearms training complex used by the FBI, the Customs Service, and local police forces

== Facility ==
The prison cells were designed to house one person each; however, due to overcrowding, many house two prisoners each. For example, in March 2012, the facility's total population was more than 166.6% of its design capacity.

As of October 1st, 2026, RJDCF was incarcerating people at 137.3% of its design capacity, with 3,844 occupants.

In 1989, RJDCF opened a reception center which accepted newly sentenced inmates from across Southern California. However, in 2012, the institution changed from its previous reception center mission, and completed the conversion of three of its five facilities to sensitive needs yards. Other missions have included housing and providing treatment to inmates with severe mental illnesses, and inmates who have been identified as having medium to high risk medical concerns.

Donovan has five interfaith chapels. Each religion represented at Donovan gets a series of lockers to store materials.

The prison includes a bakery that serves the facility and five other CDCR facilities. Each day, it produces about 9,760 loaves. About 85 prisoners work in the bakery, as of 2010. During that year, the monthly salary of a prisoner working in the bakery was between $90 ($132.88 when adjusted for inflation) and $100 ($147.64 when adjusted for inflation). KPBS said that bakery jobs were "desirable" compared to clerk and custodial jobs, which pay a monthly salary between $24 and $48.

The prison also includes a shoe factory; it manufactures shoes used by prisoners throughout CDCR. It makes both high-top and low-top versions. About 1,000 shoes are produced every day. In 2010, the monthly salary for an employee was between $90 and $100, so the shoe factory positions are prized in Donovan.

The prison formerly housed an eyeglass factory. It built glasses for Medi-Cal patients. About 115 prisoners worked in the factory. It closed in 2009. As of 2010, there are discussions about a possible reopening.

On November 22, 2013, Sirhan Sirhan was transferred to Donovan. Sirhan was convicted of assassinating Robert F. Kennedy. The transfer to Donovan occurred, coincidentally, on the 50th anniversary of the assassination of Robert Kennedy's brother, John F. Kennedy.

== Operations ==
Each week, "Level 4" (maximum security) prisoners may have 15 hours of yard time.

A court order requiring guards to wear body cameras when dealing with inmates began in 2021 due to a culture of retaliation. Various documented uses of excessive force included tipping over the wheelchairs of disabled prisoners, punching a hard-of-hearing inmate in the face when he asked for written communication from the guard because he couldn't hear what the guard had said and using pepper spray on mentally ill convicts.

== Demographics ==
In 2010, Donovan Correctional Facility had about 4,800 prisoners. Between 150 and 200 of the prisoners were Native Americans.

During that year prisoners belonged to 15 religious faiths.

== Notable prisoners ==
=== Current ===
Inmate Name	Register Number	Status	Details
Cimarron Bell	AI1378	Sentenced to death.	Convicted of murdering four people.
Javier Bolden	AV2228	Serving two life terms without parole.	One of two perpetrators of the 2012 murders of Ming Qu and Ying Wu in which Bolden and another man, Bryan Barnes, killed the students in their car near the University of Southern California campus.
Jesse James Hollywood	AC4442	Serving a life sentence without parole.	One of the participants of the 2000 kidnapping and murder of Nicholas Markowitz. Jesse would flee to Brazil, before being extradited back to America and convicted for his crimes.
Suge Knight	BH6458	Serving a 28-year sentence.	Former CEO and co-founder of Death Row Records who was convicted of voluntary manslaughter in the 2015 death of Terry Carter in which Knight plowed his car into him.
Daniel William Marsh	AW0819	Serving a 52-year to life sentence.	Perpetrator of the brutal 2013 murders of Claudia Maupin and Oliver Northup in which Marsh stabbed to death and mutilated the elderly couple.
Erik Galen Menendez	K14101	Serving a life sentence. Resentenced in May 2025 to 50 years to life with the possibility of parole.	Both convicted of the 1989 murders of their parents, José and Mary Louise "Kitty" Menendez.
Joseph Lyle Menendez	K13758	Serving a life sentence. Resentenced in May 2025 to 50 years to life with the possibility of parole.	Both convicted of the 1989 murders of their parents, José and Mary Louise "Kitty" Menendez.
Mark Rogowski	H27508	Serving a life sentence; denied parole.	Former skateboarder who was convicted of the 1991 rape-murder of Jessica Bergsten.
Sirhan Sirhan	B21014	Life imprisonment; with the possibility of parole.	Assassination of Senator Robert F. Kennedy.

- Anand Jon – Former fashion designer convicted of rape and other sexual offenses.
- Kenneth Kimes Jr. – Son and accomplice of Sante Kimes.
- Charles Ray Merritt - Perpetrator of the 2010 McStay family murders.
- James Mitchell – Heir to the San Francisco–based Mitchell Brothers adult film business, one of the porn industry's pioneer dynasties during the 1960s and 1970s. Mitchell is the son of Jim Mitchell, who started the famous adult entertainment empire with his brother, Artie. He is a convicted murderer who was sentenced to 35 years to life in 2011 for killing the mother of his daughter with a softball bat in a Novato backyard and kidnapping their young daughter in 2009.
- Billie Dureyea Shell – Convicted of second-degree murder.
- Brett Thomas – Teenaged spree killer and rapist.
- Tyler Williams – A perpetrator of the murders of Gary Matson and Winfield Mowder.
- Tex Watson – Convicted killer and member of the Manson Family.
- Joe Son – Mixed martial arts fighter, manager, and actor. Serving 34 years to life for various crimes including rape and manslaughter.

=== Former ===
- Anerae Brown – Rapper and Crips gang member known as "X-Raided" convicted of gang-related homicide; released on parole in 2018.
- John Getreu – Convicted serial killer; Getreu died in 2023, aged 79, while serving his sentence.
- Roy Norris – One of the two "Tool Box Killers"; was later moved to California Medical Facility, where he died of natural causes a week later on February 24, 2020, at 72 years old.
- John Robert Schrieffer – Physicist and Nobel Prize winner convicted of and sentenced to two years for vehicular manslaughter. Schrieffer died in a Florida nursing home in July 2019, at the age of 88.
- Antron Singleton – Rapper known as "Big Lurch" convicted of killing and cannibalizing his roommate.
