= Brett Thomas =

American spree killer and rapist

- Born: Brett Matthew Paul Thomas; January 5, 1959 (age 67); Orange County, California, U.S.

Details
- Date: January 21–29, 1977
- Killed: 4 (1 by Titch, 3 by Thomas)
- Weapons: .22 rifle

Brett Matthew Paul Thomas (born January 5, 1959) is an American spree killer who, with help from his accomplice Mark Wayne Titch, committed four brutal murders in Orange County, California, in January 1977 for various reasons. According to local authorities, Thomas was recognized as one of the most brutal killers in the county's history. The fact that at the time of the killings, he was only 18 and Titch 17, respectively, makes them exceptional cases.

== Early years ==
Brett Thomas was born on January 5, 1959, in Orange County, California, into a poor family. In the 1970s, he lived at a public housing complex in Stanton, called the Stanton Apartment Complex, which was mainly populated by socially disadvantaged people and criminals. The housing complex was nicknamed "The Zoo" because of the criminogenic situation there. Since an early age, Thomas showed signs of anti-social behavior, due to poor school performance and frequent absenteeism in the mid-1970s. He eventually dropped out of school and began to support himself through crimes.

== Murders ==
On January 21, 1977, Thomas decided to burglarize the apartment of 20-year-old Laura Stoughton. His accomplice was his close friend and neighbor Mark Wayne Titch (July 31, 1959 – April 23, 2014), with whom Thomas had repeatedly committed thefts and robberies. During the burglary, Stoughton returned home and found them. Thomas and Titch grabbed the girl, put her in the trunk of their car and drove to the desert area of Orange County, where she was raped at night and thereafter shot dead with a .22 caliber rifle by Titch. On January 24, Thomas and Titch burst into a dairy store in Garden Grove, intent on robbing it. During the robbery, Thomas shot and killed the 35-year-old owner, Ephraim Christian. After murdering him, the criminals stole his belongings and valuables, but were unable to open the cash register. In the early morning of January 29, Brett Thomas planned the robberies of a billiard club and a laundromat, with both criminals tracing the owner - Aubrey Duncan. That same night, they followed Duncan to his house, where he was attacked on his doorstep. During the attack, Thomas shot him with the .22 caliber rifle, and Titch, having searched the body, stole the keys. The shots from the weapon attracted unwanted attention, resulting in the appearance of Duncan's wife and one of his daughters - 18-year-old Denise, whom Thomas also shot three times, killing her. After the killings, Thomas and Titch returned to the billiard club, where they again managed to steal some valuable items, but as was the case with the dairy store, were unable to open the cash register, quickly leaving after hearing that somebody was approaching in their car. In the following days, the duo made several more successful thefts and robberies.

== Arrest ==
On February 4, Thomas and Titch's car was stopped and inspected during a routine check of documents in San Bernardino County. During said inspection, it turned out that the car was stolen and on a wanted list, along with a .22 caliber rifle, valuable items, blood stains and other incriminating evidence. The suspects were detained, taken to the police station in Anaheim and interrogated.

== Trial ==
During the investigations, Thomas and Titch insisted on their innocence and refused to cooperate. Only after a forensic ballstic examination confirmed the fact that all the victims were actually killed with weapons belonging to the suspects, in August, Brett Thomas and Mark Titch, in exchange for the death penalty being dropped, agree to a plea bargain. Thomas pleaded guilty to three murders, kidnapping and several robberies; Titch pleaded guilty to one murder, kidnapping, assaulting a police officer, several thefts and burglaries with intent of stealing private property. Their trial began in the fall, with both entering a deal with the judge. On October 17, both murderers were sentenced to life imprisonment with the possibility of parole every 7 years.

== Aftermath ==
Thomas was allowed to file for parole in February 1983, but it was refused. In subsequent years, he filed motions another 14 times, but was constantly denied release due to protests from relatives of the victims and his deviant behavior. From 1977 to 2015, Thomas was prosecuted 56 times for violating prison rules and committing unlawful acts of violence. For about 20 years, he has been a member of a supremacist prison gang. His last hearing took place in April 2015, but was denied again. He was forbidden from filing applications until 2022. He remains incarcerated at R.J. Donovan Correctional Facility.

Beginning in 1983, Mark Titch filed applications eight times, but was also denied due to the protests from the victims' families. While in custody, he graduated from high school and received a diploma, mastered the profession of a welder and then graduated from Chapman University. Over the years spent behind bars, Titch became an active follower of the Disciples of Christ. His next parole hearing was due in May 2014, but he died on April 22, 2014, while in custody at San Quentin State Prison.

== Victims ==
- January 21: Laura Stoughton, 20 (was raped and shot by Titch)
- January 24: Ephraim Christian, 35 (shot by Thomas)
- January 29: The double killing: Both were shot by Thomas
  - Aubrey Duncan, 48
  - Denise Duncan, 18
