= Rodney Halbower =

American murderer and suspected serial killer

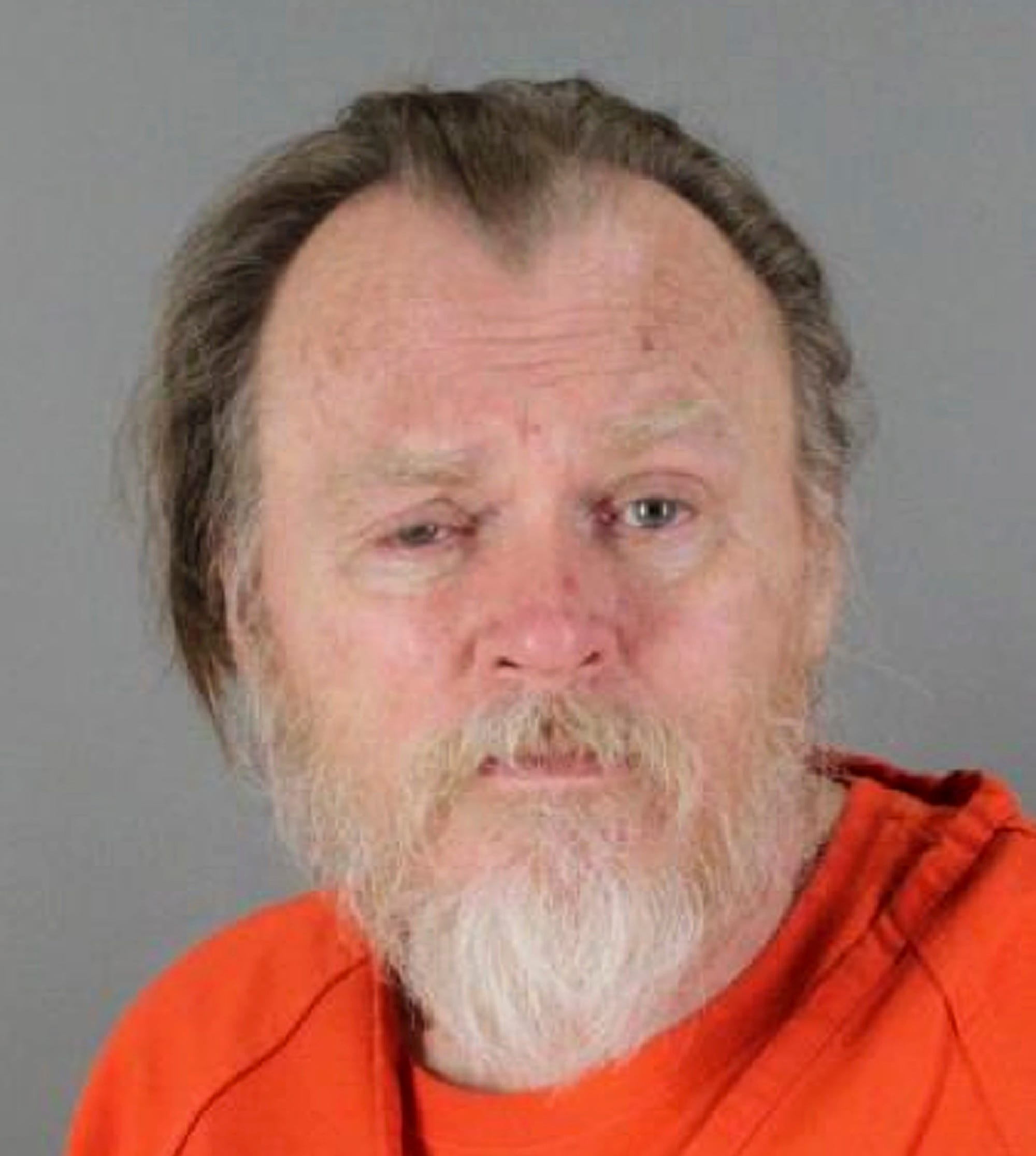
- Mugshot
- Born: Rodney Lynn Halbower; June 27, 1948 (age 78); Wisconsin, U.S.
- Other name: The San Mateo Slasher
- Convictions: Michigan; Burglary; Robbery; Nevada; Sexual assault (3 counts); Escape; Attempted escape Oregon; Rape; Attempted murder Robbery; California; First degree murder (2 counts)
- Penalty: Michigan; 5 years (burglary); 4 years (robbery); Nevada; Life imprisonment with parole Oregon; 15 years California; Life imprisonment without parole

Details
- Victims: 3 (confirmed), 5 (suspected)
- Span of crimes: January – April 1976
- Country: United States
- States: California, Nevada
- Date apprehended: March 2014 (for the final time)

Rodney Lynn Halbower (born June 27, 1948) is an American serial killer. He is the prime suspect in the Gypsy Hill killings, a series of murders of young women in San Mateo County, California and Reno, Nevada), whose killer was named The San Mateo Slasher. In March 2014, based on DNA profiling, Halbower was named as a person of interest in the murders. By this time, Cathy Woods, a mental patient who was convicted for one of the victims' murders, had already been exonerated after 35 years behind bars. He has been convicted of two murders and is believed to be linked to two murders related to the Gypsy Hill killings as well as a murder in Nevada. At the time of his identification, Halbower himself had been imprisoned for 38 years in Oregon.

== Early years ==
Rodney Halbower was born on June 27, 1948, in Wisconsin and grew up in Muskegon, Michigan. He reportedly began to show signs of anti-social behavior as a child and gained a reputation as a bully. He was a frequent truant and was kicked out of school and sent to an institution for juvenile offenders after an arrest.

== Criminal career ==
In 1963, Halbower was released on parole, but quickly violated the conditions of his probation. Released the following year, Halbower was arrested for burglarizing a house. He escaped a county prison in September. A few days later, he was captured, convicted, and sentenced to five years imprisonment. Halbower was arrested again in 1970 for robbery, of which he was convicted and sentenced to 4 years imprisonment. He escaped and was recaptured again.

In 1975, he was paroled and left Michigan and moved to Nevada, settling in Reno. In December of that year, he attacked a girl, beating and raping her. Halbower was arrested, released on bail, and at large during the preliminary investigation, which ended in the spring of 1976. In May, his trial began, during which he was found guilty of assaulting the girl and received a sentence of life imprisonment.

In June 1977, Halbower escaped during a softball match in the territory near the Carson City prison. He was put on a wanted list and recaptured in July 1977 while attempting to kidnap his 7-year-old daughter. Halbower was extradited to Nevada to serve his sentence for the rape charges. He was not tried for kidnapping his daughter, but he was convicted of fleeing from prison, for which he was later given a 6-year sentence.

On December 15, 1977, Halbower escaped from prison, climbing on the roof of one of the buildings along the wall, reaching the fence and escaping. The investigation revealed that the escape was possible due to improper performance of duties by the guards, who were subsequently subjected to disciplinary action.

Once recaptured, in September 1978, Halbower attempted to escape from Nevada State Maximum Security Prison but was captured before clearing a final fence. He had managed to cut through three sets of bars: one on his cell, another on the tier outside the cell, and a third set of bars on the window of the Cellhouse. He was within 100 yards of freedom when a guard saw movement outside and notified the guard in the tower. After shots were fired, Halbower surrendered and was escorted back into the prison.

Halbower escaped again, stole a car, and drove to Oregon, where he attacked a girl in Medford in Jackson County, raping and stabbing her several times. The victim survived and identified Halbower, who was arrested in early 1987 and convicted in March for rape and assault. He was sentenced to 15 years imprisonment but was extradited back to Nevada to continue serving his life imprisonment term.

He was released from prison on parole in November 2013 but was immediately extradited to Oregon to serve his 15-year term for rape and attempted murder.

== Gypsy Hill killings ==
On January 8, 1976, the body of 18-year-old Veronica Cascio was discovered in a creek on the grounds of the Sharp Park Golf Course in Pacifica, California. She had suffered about 30 stab wounds.

A few weeks later, 14-year-old Tanya Blackwell went missing after leaving her home in Pacifica. Her body was discovered on June 6 at Sharp Park Road in a wooded area of the city known as Gypsy Hills. Like Cascio, she also had been stabbed many times.

On February 2, 17-year-old Paula Baxter went missing. Her naked body found two days later in Millbrae. She had been stabbed four times, was sexually assaulted, and suffered multiple head injuries from a blunt object.

On May 6, the skeletonized remains of a woman were found in a shallow grave at South San Francisco. She was later identified as 26-year-old Carol Booth, reported missing since March 15. All of the victims, with the exception of Booth, were killed in San Mateo County. The lack of witnesses and forensic evidence halted the investigations for decades.

== Exposure ==
In 2013, Halbower began serving his sentence in Oregon, with a set release date of 2026. During his incarceration, a blood sample was taken from him for DNA testing, which, in September 2014, showed correspondence of his genotypic profile with the profile of the man who had left biological evidence on the corpses of Paula Baxter and Veronica Cascio. The study also showed that Halbower's DNA profile coincided with the one isolated from saliva on cigarette butts found near the body of Michelle Mitchell, who was killed in February 1976 in Reno, Nevada.

In 1980, mental patient Cathy Woods was convicted of Mitchell's murder. In 2014, DNA testing proved her innocence. In 2015, Woods was released, after spending 35 years in prison. Rodney Halbower was extradited to California, where, in January 2015, he was charged with three of the murders, to which he pled not guilty.

Halbower was suspected in the murder of Denise Lampe, but based on the results of the DNA study, 71-year-old Leon Seymour was later charged with the Lampe killing. Seymour would be convicted of Lampe's murder in 2023.

== Trial ==
Halbower was extradited to California in January 2015, but the trial was repeatedly delayed. In 2016, Halbower was declared sane, filed a petition to refuse qualified legal assistance and lawyers, and filed a petition to represent himself at trial. A judge denied them as a number of experts had extradition to Nevada, where Halbower is due to stand trial for the murder of Michelle Mitchell. In 2018, Halbower was sentenced to life without parole after being found guilty of murdering Paula Baxter and Veronica Cascio.

== See also ==
- List of serial killers in the United States
