= Lei family murders =

Lei family quintuple slayings

2012 Ingleside, San Francisco homicides
- Lei family murders (San Francisco County)
- Location: 37.722694°N 122.449965°W; Ingleside, San Francisco, California, United States
- Date: March 23, 2012
- Attack type: Mass murder
- Deaths: 5
- Perpetrator: Binh Thai Luc (born 1976 or 1977)
- Charges: Five counts of murder with special circumstances of multiple murders and lying in wait, five counts of robbery, and two counts of burglary
- Convicted: December 11, 2017

Five people were found dead at a home in Ingleside, San Francisco, United States on the morning of Friday, March 23, 2012. The victims, all Chinese immigrants, were an elderly couple, two of their adult children, and their daughter-in-law. In Chinese-language media both in the United States and overseas, which devoted the most coverage to the killings, the case was usually referred to as the Lei family quintuple slayings. (Note: Lei family (Chinese: 雷氏 or Chinese: 雷家) quintuple (traditional Chinese: 五屍; simplified Chinese: 五尸; lit. 'five bodies'; or Chinese: 五口; lit. 'five mouths') slayings (Chinese: 命案; lit. 'fatality case'; traditional Chinese: 兇案; simplified Chinese: 凶案; lit. 'murder case'; or traditional Chinese: 滅門; simplified Chinese: 灭门; lit. 'slaying of a whole family').)

Police initially believed the case to be a murder-suicide, but two days later arrested 35-year-old San Francisco resident Binh Thai Luc, (Note: Vietnamese: Lục Bình Thái or Lục Thái Bình. Generally transcribed in Chinese media reports as traditional Chinese: 陸平泰; simplified Chinese: 陆平泰; pinyin: Lù Píngtái; Cantonese Yale: Luhk Pìhngtáai. Some reports used traditional Chinese: 陸炳財; simplified Chinese: 陆炳财; pinyin: Lù Bǐngcái; Cantonese Yale: Luhk Bíngchòih.) a friend of one of the victims, and charged him with five counts of murder, five counts of robbery, and two counts of burglary. At his arraignment on April 5, 2012, Luc pleaded not guilty to the charges. After years of delays in preliminary hearings as prosecutors requested additional time to review evidence, Luc's trial finally began on October 10, 2017. Following a seven-week trial and a week of deliberation, on December 11 the jury found Luc guilty of all the murder and burglary charges, as well as five counts of attempted robbery. Luc was subsequently sentenced to five consecutive life terms and began serving his sentence at California State Prison, Corcoran in March 2018. On Luc's appeal three years later, a higher court overturned three of the attempted robbery convictions, but upheld the murder and burglary convictions, ruling that the evidence was sufficient and the jury instructions were proper.

Luc's arrest and conviction led to political controversy over deportation from the United States, in particular the Supreme Court ruling in Zadvydas v. Davis that existing statutes did not authorize long-term post-prison detention of criminals whose deportations could not be carried out. Luc, a native of Vietnam who immigrated to the U.S. legally in 1989 as a child, was ordered deported after a 1998 conviction for armed robbery, but was released in the U.S. after completing his sentence because Vietnam's repatriation agreement with the U.S. explicitly excludes people who arrived in the U.S. before 1995. Republican politicians suggested amending the law to permit longer-term detention of deportable criminals and to deny visas to citizens of countries which failed to issue a travel document to any person ordered deported from the United States, and in 2017, the Vietnamese and U.S. governments formed a working group to discuss deportation issues.

== Killings ==
=== Discovery ===
At approximately 7:45 am PST on March 23, 2012, three people were found dead inside a row house with the address of 16 Howth Street, located in the Ingleside district of San Francisco, near City College of San Francisco. The bodies were discovered by a daughter and granddaughter of the elder slain couple. Police arrived and found two more bodies in the house's backyard. A neighbor said that she heard a "loud male person angry or yelling at around midnight" the night prior to the morning the bodies were found, but did not hear any gunshots. The five victims were all Chinese immigrants and were related to each other; among the dead was 37-year-old Yingxue "Jess" Lei, the owner of the house. Investigators said that the victims suffered from blunt trauma, and ruled out gunshot wounds as the cause of death. Police also believed an "edged weapon" was involved in the slayings, although they never located the weapon that was used. News reports speculated that the killings were motivated by an attempt to collect on gambling debts; investigators declined to comment on that theory.

=== Arrest ===
Following the homicides, police carried out intensive investigations involving more than forty officers, and executed search warrants in San Francisco and in neighboring San Mateo County to locate the suspect. On Sunday, March 25, 2012, the San Francisco Police Department announced that they had arrested 35-year-old Binh Thai Luc, a San Francisco man, and charged him with five counts of murder in connection with the five bodies found in the home. Luc has an extensive criminal record, and his younger brother, 32-year-old Brian Luc, also a San Francisco resident, was arrested the same day as his brother on unrelated charges of drugs and ammunition possession and violation of probation. Binh Thai Luc is reported to have known all five of the victims, and had been a frequent guest at their house. Police stated that both Luc brothers were affiliated with a Vietnamese street gang. At the time, Binh Thai Luc was employed as a plumber.

=== Victims ===
The five victims were:

- Hua Shun Lei (雷華舜; husband), 65, a native of Taishan, Guangdong, was previously a mathematics teacher in China. After moving to the US, he worked at the R&G Lounge in Chinatown for 18 years, first as a kitchen assistant and later as a cook. His specialty was sliced roast duck.
- Wan Yi Xu (許婉儀; wife), 62, was a cashier at Target.
- Vincent Lei (雷元驥; son), 32, was an architect.
- Chia Huei "Chantel" Chu (朱嘉慧; daughter-in-law), 30, a student at the nearby City College of San Francisco since 2007, was from Taiwan.
- Yingxue "Jess" Lei (雷映雪; daughter), 37, was a software engineer for Quantitative Medical Systems, Inc., in the East Bay city of Emeryville.

== Pre-trial court appearances ==
=== Legal representation ===
In his first court appearance, Luc, who is of Chinese descent, requested a Cantonese court interpreter, but also spoke to the judge in English, and asked to be represented by the public defender's office. At the San Francisco County Superior Court on March 29, 2012, before Judge Lucy McCabe, Chief Assistant District Attorney Sharon Woo argued that there existed a potential conflict of interest if Luc were represented by the public defender's office, as the office had previously represented Luc's brother Brian Luc, who was a potential witness. Public Defender Jeff Adachi argued that this was not relevant as his office no longer represented Brian Luc, but McCabe sided with Woo, and so Binh Thai Luc's defense was handed over to private attorney Mark Goldrosen. Separately, the public defender's office filed an appeal from McCabe's decision not to permit it to represent Luc. The matter came before Judge Newton Lam, who on April 10 denied the appeal.

=== Possibility of death penalty ===
District Attorney George Gascón stated in late March 2012 that he probably would not seek the death penalty, though Luc might be eligible due to special circumstance enhancements. A poll conducted by CBS affiliate KPIX-TV around the same time found that 56% of San Francisco residents thought the government should pursue the death penalty in its case against Luc, while 33% were opposed and 11% unsure. When interviewed again on the matter in late April 2012, Gascón stated that the special circumstances committee (composed of senior homicide prosecutors) was still awaiting sufficient evidence before making the final decision. During Luc's court appearance on June 19, 2015, Assistant District Attorney Michael Swart stated that the prosecution would not be seeking the death penalty. The maximum sentence Luc faced for each count was thus life imprisonment.

=== Arraignment and hearings ===
Luc was arraigned on five counts of murder with special circumstances of multiple murders and lying in wait, five counts of robbery, and one count of burglary before Judge Samuel Feng of the San Francisco County Superior Court on April 5, 2012. He pleaded not guilty to all charges, but otherwise did not speak. His bail was set at $25 million, and his next court appearance was set for May 3 at which time a hearing date would be decided. Feng stated that he was "not comfortable" with granting bail, but Sharon Woo of the District Attorney's Office responded that because the investigation was still in its early stages, the prosecution was not yet prepared to offer sufficient evidence to meet the standard of "likely guilt" required to deny bail. Additionally, U.S. Immigration and Customs Enforcement (ICE) placed an immigration detainer on Luc, such that even if he were to make bail, he would be released into ICE custody rather than being freed. In late June 2012, Luc's brother was sentenced on unrelated drug charges.

Luc appeared in court again on July 20, 2012. He continued to be represented by Mark Goldrosen. Feng announced that Luc's trial would be held on October 25, and then adjourned the hearing. Goldrosen explained the delay by stating that the investigation was still ongoing and that both the prosecution and the defense needed time to review witness statements and evidence. He also stated that his Luc was in good health and had received a visit from his parents. By January 2013, Luc's case had still not gone to trial. A pre-trial hearing held before Judge Jerome Benson on January 15 resulted only in another court date being set for March 19, nearly a year after the date of the deaths, because a police report was not yet complete. At the hearing on March 19, Judge Benson had been expected to set a date for a preliminary hearing, but instead defense lawyers again stated that they needed more time to review evidence, and so the hearing was set to continue on May 3. In Luc's court appearance on May 30, the preliminary hearing was again delayed until July 30.

By December 2013, the preliminary hearing still had not been held; in Luc's court appearance that month, the judge set the new date for the preliminary hearing to February 14, 2014. Afterwards, the date was further pushed back to April 11, June 18, and then July 17. On July 17, Luc did not appear in court due to illness; the court set dates of October 16 for the status conference and November 17 for the preliminary hearing. The preliminary hearing finally began on March 16, 2015, and concluded in June.

== Trial and sentencing ==
Luc's trial was initially scheduled to begin in March 2016, but prosecutors requested delays in order to have more time to review evidence. Luc's trial finally began on October 10, 2017, before Judge Carol Yaggy. Luc was ultimately charged with two counts of burglary rather than the original one count, as the house consisted of two separate residential units each with their own entrance: the upstairs portion for the elder slain couple Hua Shun Lei and Wan Yi Xu and their daughter Jess Lei, the downstairs portion for the younger slain couple Vincent Lei and Chia Huei Chu. In opening statements, prosecutor Eric Fleming of the District Attorney's Office emphasized physical evidence linking Luc to the crime scene, including Luc's fingerprint on a bottle of Windex found at the scene and the blood of the victims found in Luc's car and on a pair of jeans at Luc's home, and suggested that efforts to destroy evidence at the scene by disassembling the sinks in order to flood the house would have required plumbing experience to carry out. Mark Goldrosen's defense of Luc focused on the prosecution's failure to advance a plausible motive for the killings, and on leads which the police failed to follow due to their focus on Luc, such as a report by an informant that a Chinatown gang leader had ordered the killings and DNA samples which had not been tested. Goldrosen stated that while Luc was present at the scene, another person masterminded and carried out the killings.

The prosecution presented DNA evidence in court on October 17, while a forensic examiner testified on October 24. In the fourth week of the trial, the six police officers who initially investigated the scene testified. Both direct examination and cross-examination focused on several thousand dollars of cash left at the scene. Closing arguments began on November 28, and continued for another day. Fleming suggested that Luc was motivated by money, noting that he had suffered losses while gambling at Artichoke Joe's Casino, while Goldrosen reiterated that the evidence "strongly suggests there was more than one person involved". Jury deliberation then began on Monday, December 5, after court holidays due to the long weekend for Thanksgiving. After five days of deliberation, the jury still had not reached a verdict, a fact which Goldrosen attributed to the complexity of the case.

On December 11, the jury found Luc guilty of five counts of murder, five counts of attempted robbery, and two counts of burglary, but acquitted him on the charges of robbery. District Attorney Gascón expressed satisfaction with the verdict, stating that "we’re pleased we’re getting some accountability for the family and for the community", while Goldrosen stated that other individuals involved in the killings were still at large and that Luc "understands that this is the beginning of the process and there are appellate procedures". On March 1, 2018, Yaggy ordered that Luc serve five back-to-back life sentences, overriding an objection by Goldrosen who had requested concurrent sentences. Prosecutor David Merin, who took over the case from Fleming after Luc's sentencing, presented the victim impact statement on behalf of the victims' family member Nicole Lei, who stated that it was too painful for her to attend the sentencing. Luc did not speak during sentencing, except to state to his lawyer that he wished to appeal. He was admitted to California State Prison, Corcoran to begin serving his sentence on March 7, 2018.

== Appeal ==
Luc appealed his convictions to the California First District Court of Appeal, citing grounds for reversal of each conviction, as well as other issues regarding restitution fines and sentencing. He was represented by attorney Maribeth Halloran of the First District Appellate Project. The appellate panel consisted of presiding judge Stuart R. Pollak, Jon B. Streeter, and Alison M. Tucher. In the unanimous opinion handed down in March 2021, Pollak ruled that the first ground of appeal, an amendment to California's felony murder statute following Luc's conviction, was non-cognizable on appeal and that Luc should instead raise the issue in a petition for relief in the trial court. Secondly, Luc challenged jury instructions regarding criminal liability for aiding and abetting murder, but Pollak found that the instructions were a correct statement of law. Luc further raised evidential deficiencies in the murder and attempted robbery convictions; Pollak disallowed this ground of appeal in relation to the murder convictions, but allowed it in relation to three of the five original attempted robbery convictions, stating that the evidence only supported that Luc had attempted to rob Vincent Lei and his wife, but not the other three murder victims whose bedrooms Luc did not enter. The fifth portion of Luc's appeal argued that the two counts of burglary should be reduced to a single count, characterizing the crime scene as consisting of a single residential unit, but Pollak upheld the two separate convictions, pointing to facts such as the separate entrances of the downstairs and upstairs portions of the house to rule that inhabitants of the former had a separate "reasonable expectation of privacy" from the latter. Finally, Pollak accepted Luc's argument for remand to the trial court for resentencing, as an amendment to mandatory sentencing provisions of the California Penal Code following Luc's conviction would allow the trial judge to disregard Luc's prior felony conviction in deciding whether or not to impose a five-year enhancement to Luc's sentence. In May 2021, the Supreme Court of California declined Luc's petition to review the Court of Appeal's ruling.

== Deportation issues ==
=== Treaty and case law ===
In 1998, Binh Thai Luc was convicted of second-degree robbery and assault with a firearm for holding up a Chinese restaurant and a clothing wholesaler in San Jose in 1996. He served eight years of an eleven-year prison sentence at San Quentin State Prison before being released early on August 10, 2006, into U.S. Immigration and Customs Enforcement custody and sent to the Eloy Detention Center in Arizona pending an appearance in immigration court. The following month, an immigration judge ordered that Luc be deported from the United States.

In the end, Luc could not be deported because the government of Vietnam refused to issue a travel document to allow him to be re-admitted to that country. Luc moved from his native Vietnam to the U.S. as a legal immigrant in 1989. However, Vietnam did not have a repatriation agreement with the United States at all at the time of Luc's deportation proceedings, and even under the subsequently-signed 2008 U.S.–Vietnam repatriation agreement, Vietnam is only required to accept deportees who arrived in the U.S. after the 1995 resumption of relations. University of San Francisco law professor Bill Hing stated that this restriction exists because the Vietnamese government believes that Vietnamese who went to the U.S. before that date—primarily refugees from communism—are "products of the United States", and their criminal acts are not Vietnam's responsibility. Due to the 2001 Supreme Court ruling in Zadvydas v. Davis, Luc could not be detained indefinitely either, and was released from ICE custody after 180 days.

=== Political responses ===
Politicians responded to the news of Luc's arrest with calls for post-prison restrictions on criminals who could not be deported. San Francisco mayor Ed Lee requested that the federal government consider ways of preventing undeportable felons from moving back to the areas where they had committed their original crimes, while various Congressional Republicans called for the passage of legislation addressing the situation.

Representative Lamar Smith (R-TX) and Senator Chuck Grassley (R-IA) wrote a letter to Secretary of Homeland Security Janet Napolitano on June 1, 2012, expressing concerns about Luc and other foreign nationals who had been ordered deported but continued to live freely in the United States due to Zadvydas v. Davis, and inquiring whether she would support legislation to amend the Immigration and Nationality Act of 1952 to authorize detention of deportees beyond six months. In June 2013, Senator Jim Inhofe (R-OK) moved S.Amdt. 1203 to the Border Security, Economic Opportunity, and Immigration Modernization Act of 2013 to authorize detention of deportees beyond six months when their countries of citizenship refused to readmit them, and gave a floor speech on June 20, 2013, in which he mentioned Luc's case several times as justification. A year later, Grassley, Inhofe, Jeff Sessions (R-AL), David Vitter (R-LA), and Ted Cruz (R-TX) introduced the Keep Our Communities Safe Act (S. 2463) for similar purposes; Grassley's press release regarding the act also discussed the allegations against Luc. Subsequent press releases accompanying re-introduction of the Keep Our Communities Safe Act in 2015 (S. 291) and 2019 (S. 2869) also discussed Luc's case, decrying what Grassley, Inhofe, and their co-sponsors described as the "catch and release loophole" created by Zadvydas, which had allowed Luc to remain free in the United States.

Representative Ted Poe (R-TX) proposed broader measures: he gave floor speeches on March 27 and July 10, 2012, calling for the passage of the Deport Foreign Convicted Criminals Act (H.R. 3256) he had introduced on October 25, 2011, which provides for denial of immigrant and non-immigrant visas to nationals of countries which "refused or unreasonably delayed repatriation" of deportees; in each speech, he referred to Luc and stated that Vietnam and other countries "who fail to take back their lawfully deported criminals" should face consequences. He further brought up Luc's case in remarks to Napolitano on July 19 when she appeared before the House Committee on the Judiciary.

After Vietnamese prime minister Nguyễn Xuân Phúc's May 2017 visit to the White House to meet with U.S. president Donald Trump, the U.S. Embassy in Hanoi and the Vietnamese Ministry of Foreign Affairs formed a working group and held discussions in July 2017 regarding Vietnamese in the United States to whom Vietnam had refused to issue travel documents for deportation due to the 2008 repatriation agreement. The deportation issue rose to prominence again following Luc's conviction, which came less than two weeks after the controversial acquittal of an undocumented immigrant in another San Francisco homicide case, the shooting of Kathryn Steinle. In response to the news of Luc's conviction, conservative commentator Mark Krikorian condemned the Zadvydas decision.

== See also ==
- List of homicides in California
- List of 2012 murders in the United States
