= Pittsburg serial murders =

Unsolved serial murders

Details
- Victims: 5
- Span of crimes: 1998–1999
- Country: United States
- State: California
- Date apprehended: N/A

The Pittsburg serial murders refers to the killings of one man and four women in Pittsburg, California, in late 1998 and early 1999. At the time of the killings, the city had a high crime rate, which coupled with the recent murders of several people, culminated in public outcry from both the public and the media for a resolution to the situation and capture of the supposed serial killer. Despite an investigation by the FBI and a financial reward for the killer(s)'s capture being offered by the then-Governor of California Gray Davis, none of the murders were ever solved.

== Murders ==
Between November 9, 1998, and January 9, 1999, five deaths, thought to have been the work of a single offender, were recorded in Pittsburg. They were the following:

- Michael Tan (27), found in a ditch on the outskirts of North Parkside Drive on November 9, 1998. Investigation into his death revealed that he had been beaten and then drowned in the ditch approximately six hours prior to discovery. Tan was a resident of Concord and, according to his relatives and acquaintances, had no personal connection to Pittsburg. During a search of his apartment, the police noted that it had been ransacked, suggesting that Tan was likely at home during the robbery and was killed by the intruder in order to get rid of any witnesses. He is the only male victim of the killer.
- Lisa Diane Norrell (15) went missing on November 6, 1998, after leaving a quinceañera rehearsal class in nearby Antioch and returning home alone. Her body was found near a landscaping business on the highway between Pittsburg and Antioch on November 14. She had been strangled to death.
- Jessica L. Frederick (27), was found stabbed to death in an auto wrecking yard on Harbor Street and Industry Road on December 5, 1998. Her body had been dumped next to a road mostly occupied by truck repair shops and salvage businesses.
- Rachael Cruise (32) was last seen in Pittsburg on the evening of December 13, 1998, and her body found in a ditch off California Avenue two days later. She had been strangled to death. Cruise was a drug addict and spent a lot of her free time in the company of pimps and prostitutes. On that same day, another prostitute was found badly beaten in a portable toilet in Bay Point, not far from Pittsburg. She was able to provide a limited description of her assailant, whom she claimed was a Hispanic male driving a dark Chevrolet Monte Carlo.
- Valerie Dawn "China" Schultz (27)'s body was found on January 8, 1999, in a ditch out in the wastelands of Pittsburg. During the subsequent investigation, it was established that Schultz, who lived in Bay Point between 1991 and 1994, had been arrested for prostitution. In 1994, she moved to Waubun, Minnesota, but had returned to Pittsburg just a week prior to her death to stay at a local motel. While interviewing witnesses, authorities happened upon someone who claimed to have seen Schultz enter a four-door car with faded brown paint, whose distinctive feature was a noisy muffler. According to this witness, the driver was a dark-skinned man of either Hispanic or Samoan descent, aged 30–40, weighed more than 100 kg and had thick, wavy hair.

== Investigation ==
While investigating Lisa Norrell's murder, a witness was found who claimed to have seen the girl shortly after she had left the party, later seeing her walking alongside a man on the highway. In early January 1999, two unemployed men from Antioch, 39-year-old Garry Lee Walton and 24-year-old David Michael Heneby, were arrested for Norrell's murder.

In response to the murder of Lisa Norrell, the Governor of California Gray Davis offered a reward of US$50,000 for any information leading to the arrest and conviction of her killer(s).

In March 1999, 51-year-old Mohammed Ismil Niaz, Frederick's boyfriend, was arrested as a suspect in her murder. In December 1998, he had voluntarily provided the police with samples of his blood and hair, and while examining his apartment, investigators located washed-out blood stains. Based on the results of DNA profiling, it was established that the blood belonged to Frederick, but further forensic expertise excluded Niaz as the potential killer of either Frederick or the other victims in 2001.

In 2009, the list of suspects included 59-year-old Phillip Garrido, who had been arrested together with his 55-year-old wife Nancy in August for the kidnapping of 11-year-old Jaycee Dugard in 1991, whom he forcibly kept in a building in the backyard of his house and sexually abused for 18 years. During this period, Dugard gave birth to two children. After his arrest, authorities discovered that Garrido had a past of involving kidnapping and sexually assaulting young girls in the area, for which he was either acquitted or paroled. From 1998 to 1999, he worked near the places where the female victims' bodies were found. However, after a 4-day search of his home by the police, no evidence linking him to the murders were located.

At one point, the killer of Suzanne Bombardier, convicted sex offender Mitchell Lynn Bacom, was investigated for the killings, but no connection thus far has been made.

== See also ==
- List of serial killers in the United States
- List of unsolved murders (1980–1999)
