= 2016 UCLA shooting =

School shooting in Los Angeles, California

UCLA shooting
- Location: 34.068828°N 118.443919°W; Engineering Building IV UCLA, Los Angeles, California, U.S.
- Date: June 1, 2016; Before 9:49 a.m. (PDT)
- Attack type: School shooting, murder-suicide
- Weapon: Handgun
- Deaths: 3 total: 2 at the school (including the perpetrator) and 1 other in Minnesota
- Perpetrator: Mainak Sarkar
- Motive: Personal grudges, alleged theft of intellectual property

On June 1, 2016, two men were killed in a murder-suicide at a School of Engineering building on the campus of University of California, Los Angeles (UCLA). The gunman was identified as Mainak Sarkar, an Indian-born 38-year-old former UCLA Ph.D student. The victim was William Scott Klug, a professor who was Sarkar's thesis advisor while Sarkar was a student at UCLA. A woman, later identified as Sarkar's estranged wife, was found dead in Minnesota during the subsequent investigation into the shooting, and is suspected to have been killed by Sarkar several days before the UCLA shooting.

== Details ==
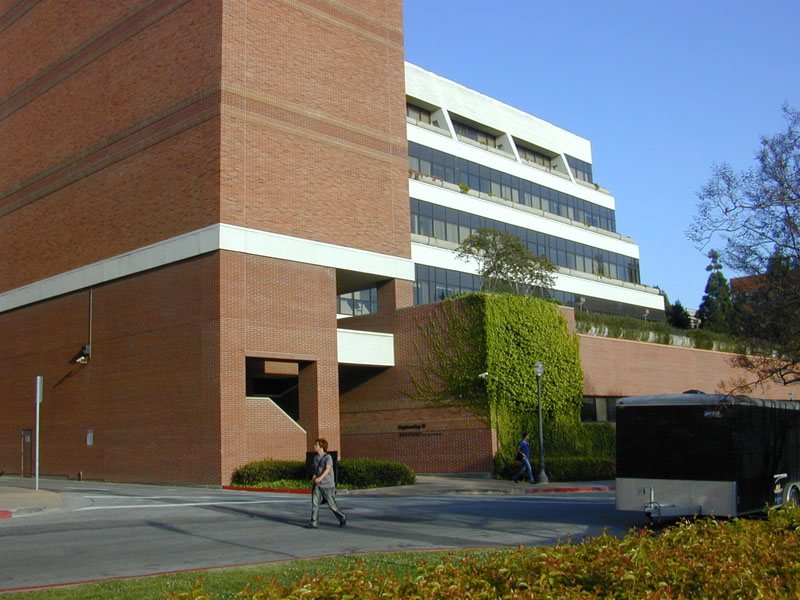
Engineering IV, the building where the shooting occurred

The shooting occurred at a fourth-floor office in Engineering IV, a building that is part of the UCLA Henry Samueli School of Engineering and Applied Science.

Immediately after the shooting, Christopher Lynch, an aerospace and mechanical engineering professor who heard the gunshots, went to Klug's office and held the door shut, after which he heard another shot and then silence. Another professor said she heard someone fall after the last shot. Lynch later said that he did not feel the gunman try to open it but suspected the gunman heard yells for the hallway to be cleared out and that police were called in. Lynch was credited for potentially saving lives during the shooting.

A campus-wide alert to avoid the area was issued via UCLA's BruinAlert system at 9:49 a.m. PDT, and Los Angeles Police Department (LAPD) officers were summoned to the building shortly before 10:00 a.m. PDT. When officers responded at Engineering IV and met Lynch, he gave them his office key so they could check rooms, and then left with another professor to check on students who locked themselves in the laboratories on the lower floor.

Two handguns and a suicide note were found near the two bodies. Shortly after the shooting, police sources told the Los Angeles Times that from the appearance of the bodies, a student may have killed a professor. At least three shots were fired in the shooting.

== Aftermath ==
Based on initial reports of the shooting, authorities mistook it for an attempted mass shooting, prompting a massive police response. School officials put the campus on lockdown as hundreds of UCLA and LAPD officers, including SWAT officers, and officers of other agencies searched the area. A nearby hospital and three elementary schools were also put on lockdown. When the lockdown was lifted just after noon (PDT), classes at UCLA were canceled for the day. An apartment traced to the gunman was searched by police, and a description of his vehicle, which had not been located, was released.

While the school was in lockdown, people at many locations found it difficult to shelter in place, as few of the doors had locks. As a result, some students resorted to creative mechanisms to keep the doors closed. Scott Waugh, the school's executive vice-chancellor and provost, said the university will review its active-shooter protocols. The issue was previously brought up during deadly mass shootings at Virginia Tech and Sandy Hook Elementary School, where students and teachers also had to improvise to keep the doors to classrooms closed. Although some schools across the country installed locks to doors, a more widespread adoption of this security measure was hindered by "the cost to retrofit doors and local fire codes that require doors to open in one motion during emergencies", according to experts. Some schools and universities disagreed about the importance of door locks during active-shooter situations; the University of Colorado stated that it wanted students and teachers to rely on training instead.

U.S. President Barack Obama was briefed about the shooting aboard Air Force One, according to White House Press Secretary Josh Earnest.

On June 3, two days after the shooting, the gunman's car was discovered by a bicyclist, parked in a residential area in Culver City, California, located about six miles southeast of the UCLA campus. It contained multiple containers of gasoline and an additional handgun. Police theorized that the containers were used to refuel the car during the gunman's drive from Minnesota to Los Angeles. They also theorized that the gunman parked in Culver City, where he had lived at one time, and took a bus that he regularly used to get to UCLA during his attendance there. A bus transfer was found on his body.

On June 8, a week after the shooting, UCLA announced the launch of a task force that would review the university's response to the incident, as well as a security analysis of the campus. The task force would later recommend "more frequent staff and student emergency-response training, more wardens to conduct emergency drills and a requirement that all faculty, staff and students provide cellphone numbers to the school so they could receive emergency-alert text messages." Two days later, on June 10, UCLA students and campus leaders also called for more research into the increase of gun violence in American schools, and announced its intention to create the UCLA Institute on Campus Violence. It will be a research center that would "utilize the university's research and public service capacity to study strategies to combat campus violence."

== Victims ==
=== William Klug ===
William Scott Klug (June 19, 1976 – June 1, 2016) was identified as the victim in the shooting at UCLA. He was a professor of mechanical and aerospace engineering. He was married and had two children at the time of his death. He was described by students as humble and easily approachable. Colleagues said he had a strong Christian faith.

Klug received an undergraduate degree at Westmont College, a Christian liberal arts college, in 1998, and master's degree and Ph.D. degrees at UCLA and the California Institute of Technology, respectively. Klug joined the UCLA faculty in 2003, and headed the Klug Research Group, a research group studying the field of biomechanics, specifically "theoretical and computational biomechanics", of which Sarkar was a member while a doctoral student.

=== Ashley Hasti ===
Ashley Erin Hasti, Sarkar's estranged wife at the time of her murder, was found dead at her Brooklyn Park, Minnesota home. Police found a broken window at the home, which they believe Sarkar used to break into the house. Hasti was found the day following the shooting at UCLA after police in Los Angeles notified police in Minnesota of a note Sarkar left in his car asking authorities to check on his cat left at his home in St. Paul.

Hasti graduated from the University of Minnesota in 2008 with a bachelor's degree in Asian languages and literature. She completed a post-baccalaureate pre-med program at Scripps College in Claremont, California, from 2009 to 2010. During that time, she met Sarkar, and married him in 2011.

At the time of her death, Hasti was a medical student at the University of Minnesota Medical School, where she had been enrolled since 2012. A native of Minneapolis–Saint Paul, Hasti attended North Hennepin Community College from 2003 to 2006 on a part-time basis, and also took classes there from 2011 to 2012. From 2011 to 2012, Hasti worked as a tutor at the community college.

== Perpetrator ==
Mainak Sarkar, a former Ph.D student of Klug's, was identified as the gunman on the day after the shooting.

Sarkar was born and raised in Durgapur, a city in the state of West Bengal, India. In 1984, he enrolled in St. Michael's School, a local co-education, English-medium school. A schoolteacher working there described Sarkar as "an ordinary boy. Very quiet. Extremely well behaved and obedient. Never causing any trouble to anyone." The teacher also said that Sarkar left the school to attend the nearby Durgapur Bidhan Chandra Institute. From 2000 to 2001, he worked for eighteen months as a software developer at Infosys in Bangalore.

According to sources and his now-deactivated LinkedIn profile, Sarkar graduated from the Indian Institute of Technology Kharagpur in West Bengal, India, in 2000 with an undergraduate degree in aerospace engineering. He then traveled to the U.S. in 2001 on a student visa to pursue graduate studies. He first attended Stanford University from 2003 to 2005, graduating with a master's degree in aeronautical and astronautical engineering. Sarkar then attended UCLA's engineering school from the fall of 2007 to the summer of 2013, graduating with a Ph.D. degree in solid mechanics. Professors at UCLA described him as a "quiet and reserved" man who would not greet them whenever he passed by, and stated that he left "little impression" in their classes.

Sarkar became a permanent U.S. resident in May 2014. He lived in Culver City while attending UCLA, but sometime after graduating from the university, he moved to Minnesota.

At some point after his relocation to the U.S., Sarkar briefly worked as a research assistant at the University of Texas at Arlington and as a software developer. After graduating from UCLA, he had been employed remotely as an engineering analyst for a rubber company in Ohio. In August 2014, he left his job, according to a former coworker.

=== Relationship with victims ===
Sarkar maintained a personal blog called "thelongdarktunnel", which has since been deleted. For months, he had been making hostile comments about Klug on social media, according to The Los Angeles Times. At one point, he called Klug a "very sick person" and accused him of stealing his computer code and giving it to another student. UCLA denied the accusation through a police official, who said, "This is the workings of his imagination." Previously, however, he was listed in 2010 as Klug's teaching assistant in a mechanical and aerospace engineering class, and had expressed gratitude to him in his doctoral dissertation; Klug was listed as his adviser in it. He was also one of six doctoral students involved in the Klug Research Group, a computational biomechanics research group organized by Klug, which developed "continuum and multiscale methods to understand the mechanics of biological structures from the molecular and cellular scales upward," according to the group's website. According to a source familiar with Sarkar and Klug's relationship, Sarkar had struggled with mental health problems such as depression, which compromised his work at UCLA.

Sarkar was linked to another murder in Brooklyn Park, Minnesota; this victim, a woman later identified as Ashley Hasti, was found shot to death in her residence. Sarkar met and dated Hasti while both were living in California. According to the Hennepin County, Minnesota Clerk's Office, Sarkar and Hasti married on July 14, 2011, but at the time of the murder, they were known to have been living separately for some time. Hasti's grandmother described Sarkar as being polite and reserved, but unable to handle Hasti teasing him. Police believe Hasti had been dead for "maybe a couple of days" when the shooting at UCLA occurred. Sarkar is believed to have gained entry into Hasti's home by breaking a window.

Police found a "kill list" at Sarkar's home in Saint Paul, Minnesota, which named Hasti and Klug as well as another UCLA professor who remains unidentified but is stated to be "alright" by a police official. This professor, who had been aware of Sarkar's issues with him, was later confirmed to have been off campus at the time of the shooting.

=== Weapons ===
After killing Hasti, Sarkar is believed by police to have equipped himself with two legally-purchased handguns, along with several rounds of ammunition and magazines, and driven from his home to Los Angeles to commit Klug's murder. A police official said of his weaponry, "He was certainly prepared to engage multiple victims". Ballistic tests indicated Klug and Hasti were both killed by the same handgun. A search of Sarkar's Minnesota apartment recovered more ammunition and a ballistic vest, alongside other items.

== Reactions ==
Klug was memorialized in a tweet posted by California Lieutenant Governor Gavin Newsom, who called him an "empathetic, brilliant teacher". On the day after the shooting, UCLA hosted a candlelight vigil, attended by hundreds, including the Mayor of Los Angeles, Eric Garcetti. UCLA established a support fund for Klug's family on June 7.

Media outlets in India noted some similarities between Sarkar's killings and a 1969 murder case at the University of California, Berkeley, where student Prosenjit Poddar "misconstrued a friendship with an American girl as an abiding commitment to a relationship, and murdered her in a fit of madness."

== See also ==
- List of homicides in California
- List of school shootings in the United States by death toll
