= Oikos University =

College in Oakland, California

- Logo
- Type: Private university
- Established: 2004
- Chairman: Elizabeth Kim
- President: Jongin Kim
- Students: Fewer than 100
- Location: Oakland, California, United States; 37°44′30″N 122°12′09″W
- Website: www.oikos.edu

Oikos University is a private Korean Christian university in Oakland, California, United States. The university is accredited by the Transnational Association of Christian Colleges and Schools (TRACS).

== History ==
Oikos University was founded in 2004 by Jongin Kim, a pastor and former South Korean military officer who emigrated from South Korea to the United States in the 1990s. Other members of staff include Chair of the Board Youngkyo Choi and Chief Operating Officer Jaehoon Moon. The school is affiliated with the Praise God Korean Presbyterian Church in Oakland. Oikos offers an associate's degree for a licensed practical nurse in its School of Nursing, and undergraduate and graduate degrees in its Schools of Theology, Music and Asian medicine.

On April 2, 2012, a mass shooting at the school killed seven people and injured three. One L. Goh, a former nursing student at the university, was arrested and charged in the case.

== Accreditation ==
The university is accredited by the Transnational Association of Christian Colleges and Schools (TRACS). It is also approved to operate in California by the California Bureau of Private Postsecondary Education and approved by the state Board of Vocational Nursing and Psychiatric Technicians. In 2011, the school applied for recognition from Healthcare Medicine Institute to teach acupuncture.

In 2012, the San Jose Mercury News reported that Oikos nursing students, the school's only licensed program, had been failing nursing license exams "at alarming rates", worrying state regulators. Oikos' nursing passing rate for students was at 58 percent in 2010 and 41 percent in 2011, well below the state average of 75 percent.

== Finances ==
Oikos University has faced persistent financial difficulties. School president Jongin Kim stopped cashing his own paychecks in 2011, while Chief Operating Officer Jaehoon Moon says he remains on the job despite more lucrative opportunities elsewhere only because of Kim's example. The school does not own its campus, a building near the Oakland International Airport, but instead rents it; in the aftermath of the shooting, it was forced to relocate classes temporarily to other rented facilities, including classrooms at Chabot College in Hayward and Unitek College in Fremont. The school's debt, combined with outstanding lawsuits for failure to pay employees, may impact its approval to operate in California.
