= Murders of Claudia Maupin and Oliver Northup =

2013 double-murder

- Location: Davis, California
- Date: April 14, 2013
- Attack type: Double-murder by stabbing, torture murder, senicide
- Weapon: Knife
- Victims: Oliver "Chip" Northup Jr., aged 87; Claudia Maupin, aged 76
- Perpetrator: Daniel William Marsh
- Motive: Thrill, homicidal ideation
- Verdict: Guilty on all counts
- Convictions: First-degree murder with special circumstances (Note: Special circumstances of killing multiple victims, torture, and lying in wait.) (2 counts); Deadly weapon enhancement (2 counts)
- Sentence: Life imprisonment with the possibility of parole after 25 years

On April 14, 2013, Oliver "Chip" Northup Jr. and his wife Claudia Maupin were tortured, murdered, and mutilated by Daniel William Marsh in the couple's Davis, California home. Marsh, who was 15 years old at the time of the murders, had an extensive history of antisocial and violent behavior. Marsh had long been fantasizing about torturing and murdering people and desired to become a serial killer. The high-profile murders have impacted the policy debate surrounding the sentencing of juvenile offenders.

On the night of April 13, 2013, after years of homicidal urges, Marsh "had enough" and decided to make his fantasies come true. In the early morning hours of April 14, he left his mother's home and wandered the streets of Davis in search of a home with open windows or doors, before coming upon Maupin and Northup's residence. Marsh cut open the window screen, invaded the home, and made his way to the couple's bedroom where he found Maupin and Northup asleep. Marsh watched them sleep for a few minutes, then stabbed both victims to death. The attack was severe, leaving Northup with 61 stab wounds and Maupin with 67 stab wounds. After murdering Northup and Maupin, Marsh dissected, eviscerated, and mutilated their bodies. The couple's bodies were discovered the next day. It wouldn't be until June that Marsh was arrested—due to Marsh's extensive planning of the murders, he left no DNA, fingerprints, footprints, or any other evidence at the crime scene. He became a suspect after bragging to his friends about the murders. Marsh was then interrogated and confessed to the crimes. He told investigators that the murders gave him a feeling of "pure happiness" that lingered for weeks. Marsh was convicted of the murders in September 2014. He was also declared sane.

In 2013, the California State Legislature passed Senate Bill 260, which allows juvenile offenders such as Marsh to seek parole after 20 or 25 years. Because of this law, Marsh is eligible for parole after serving 25 years of his life sentence. In 2016, California voters passed Proposition 57, which requires that juvenile court judges decide whether juvenile offenders are tried in juvenile court or in adult court. In 2018, Marsh's conviction was conditionally reversed pursuant to Proposition 57. A transfer hearing was held to determine if he should serve his sentence in the juvenile justice system or the adult criminal justice system. Though the juvenile court judge ruled to keep Marsh in the adult criminal justice system, in 2018, Senate Bill 1391 was signed into law by Governor Jerry Brown, preventing juveniles under age 16 from being prosecuted in adult court. Opponents of SB 1391 argued that it conflicted with Proposition 57, though O.G. v. The Superior Court of Ventura County, the California Supreme Court determined no conflict. Marsh contended that SB 1391 should apply retroactively to him, while prosecutors disagree. Oral arguments before the Third District Court of Appeal were held on August 18, 2021. If sent to the juvenile justice system, Marsh would have been released from incarceration upon turning 25. In September 2021, the Third District Court dismissed the appeal.

== Victims ==
Oliver "Chip" Jennings Northup Jr. was born on April 26, 1925, in Grand Island, Nebraska. Northup served in the United States Navy during World War II. He was a prominent attorney, receiving his undergraduate degree from UCLA and his legum baccalaureus from Boalt Hall (UC Berkeley School of Law). He continued working as an attorney until his death. Northup, who was 87 years old at the time of his death, was elected to serve on the Woodland School Board. He also served as City Attorney for Woodland, Winters and Yolo, president of the Woodland Chamber of Commerce, and president of the Woodland Rotary Club. Additionally, Northup was a musician for the Putah Creek Crawdads and a founding member of the Unitarian Universalist Church of Davis.

Northup met Claudia Maureen Maupin at the Unitarian Universalist Church of Davis. The couple married in 1996. Maupin, born May 15, 1936, was a pastoral associate at the Davis Unitarian Church. She was also active in local theater. Maupin was 76 years old at the time of her death.

Maupin had three children while Northup had six children along with two stepchildren from a previous marriage. Maupin and Northup's joint family included 11 children, 14 grandchildren, and eight great-grandchildren.

== Perpetrator ==
Daniel William Marsh
- Born: May 14, 1997 (age 29)

Details
- Victims: Claudia Maupin and Oliver Northup
- Imprisoned at: Richard J. Donovan Correctional Facility

Daniel William Marsh is a convicted felon who is serving a sentence of 52 years to life for the murders of Claudia Maupin and Oliver Northup, who lived two homes down from his father. Marsh is currently incarcerated at Richard J. Donovan Correctional Facility in San Diego. Prior to murdering Northup and Maupin, Marsh had an extensive history of violent and antisocial behavior, as well as severe mental health problems. Marsh had been fantasizing about murdering people since the age of 10 and aspired to become a serial killer.

=== 1997–2010 ===
Marsh was born on May 14, 1997. He first made local headlines in 2008 at the age of 10 after receiving American Red Cross Heroes Award for using CPR to save his father who was having a heart attack. Also in 2008, Marsh's parents underwent a contentious divorce due to his mother's affair with his former kindergarten teacher. It was at this point that Marsh's homicidal fantasies first emerged. Marsh, then 10, was enraged with the woman for whom his mother had left his father. He plotted to slit her throat or strangle her to death. At age 10, Marsh also began to have dreams of killing people. At 11, he told a therapist about fantasies of torturing people and his desire to make those fantasies come true. When Marsh was 11, he was diagnosed with adjustment disorder with depressed mood. In seventh grade, he began threatening physical harm. In May 2010, Marsh started seeing David Besa, a clinical social worker from Kaiser Permanente. The intake form described Marsh as having nightmares and temper outbursts and being nervous and not liking other people. In August 2010, he was prescribed his first antidepressant, Prozac. The prescription called for one to two capsules daily, 100 mg in quantity.

=== 2010–2013 ===
As Marsh entered his teenage years, he began using alcohol and marijuana. He went back and forth between his parents' homes until he was 14, at which point his father threw him out due to his constant drunkenness and marijuana use. Marsh's mother remained oblivious to his substance abuse. In October 2011, Marsh became anorexic. The following month, he was placed in an intensive outpatient program to treat the condition. The then 14-year-old had gotten down to 93 pounds. Marsh was hospitalized for his eating disorder at the Berkeley Hospital from December 29, 2011, to January 25, 2012. Marsh was now taking Celexa. His medication was switched to Lexapro and was then switched back to Prozac. Marsh was also given Abilify, an anti-psychotic. A doctor noted that Marsh was having feelings of derealization, with out-of-body experiences four to five times a week.

As time went on, Marsh's violent thoughts increased. At age 14, Marsh's dreams about killing people, which had begun at age 10, became more frequent. In mid-December 2012, Marsh told a school counselor about his homicidal fantasies, resulting in the police being brought to the school. Marsh was then involuntarily hospitalized because of the danger he posed to himself and others. At this point, his medication was switched to Zoloft with Seroquel. In early 2013, Marsh began taking Wellbutrin as well. In January 2013, Marsh told his school psychologist about homicidal ideations he was having regarding school peers. When the counselor asked if he would act on them, he stated, "I have full confidence that I could hurt these people." A police officer was again brought to the school, but it was determined that Marsh posed no danger to himself or others and no further action was taken. Soon after, Marsh had another meeting with the school counselor, this time describing graphically how he wanted to torture people by peeling skin from their hands and cutting off their eyelids. Marsh also confided that these graphic fantasies only "scratched the surface of his thoughts" and that he had given up fighting them. Marsh's statements were not disclosed to authorities because there was believed to be no intent or identified victims.

Marsh's homicidal thoughts continued. Whenever he looked at a person, he thought about how he would kill them. He also had fantasies of a schoolyard massacre and desired to become a serial killer. Marsh eventually began talking more persistently with friends about torturing and killing random people. He also began drawing violent pictures in art class. Marsh's drawings depicted torture and killings with morbid details on the methods. Friends of Marsh later recalled that he spoke often about killing people and said that if he were caught for murder, he would claim insanity. He also made a detailed written plan to kill his girlfriend's ex-boyfriend. Additionally, Marsh was interested in Ted Bundy, Jeffrey Dahmer, and other serial killers.

Beginning in 2012, Marsh became preoccupied with a website that promoted "gore porn" and amateur videos of actual gory events. In addition to Marsh's fascination with "gore porn" and his fantasies of murdering people, Marsh set fires and engaged in animal cruelty. His violent behavior against animals included killing cats. According to one friend, Marsh once strangled a cat in the street. When the friend asked why he strangled the cat, Marsh replied, "Well, I just wanted to do it. I just, I hated that cat." Marsh also asked the friend if he could kill his dog. Additionally, Marsh kicked a dog and killed a raccoon.

Marsh's mood seemed to improve after the murders of Northup and Maupin—he was named student of the month. However, in May 2013, Marsh was expelled from school for carrying a knife on campus.

=== Mental health conditions ===
According to forensic psychologist and psychopathy expert Matthew Logan, Marsh is a psychopath, scoring 35.8 out of 40 on the Psychopathy Checklist. James Rokop, another psychologist, says that Marsh is a sexual sadist who killed solely to gratify himself. Kathleen Merikangas, a neurologist and neuropsychiatrist, disagreed, stating that there was no evidence of Marsh having anti-social or sexual sadism disorders. Merikangas stated at trial that Marsh had manic depressive disorder, dissociative disorder, de-personalization, and anorexia nervosa. In addition to mental illness and violent thoughts, Marsh was detached from both parents. A friend of his mother's explained that he showed no emotion towards her even when she cried. Marsh also appeared not to have any concern for his mother's neurological illness, which often incapacitated her.

== Murders ==
According to Marsh's confession, on the night of April 13, 2013, after years of homicidal urges, he "had enough". Marsh, then 15, decided to live out his violent fantasies and kill someone. Marsh extensively planned the murders—he taped the bottom of his shoes so that he would not leave behind footprints and he wore gloves to avoid leaving fingerprints or DNA. He also wore all black clothing and a black face mask and armed himself with a six-inch Buck knife. On April 14, between 2:00 a.m. and 3:00 a.m., he left his mother's house and roamed the streets of Davis searching for a home with open doors or windows. According to Marsh's confession, he checked between 40 and 50 homes for open windows or doors. He finally found an open window at Maupin and Northup's condo, which was two doors down from his father's residence. He sliced open the screen, climbed through the open window, and waited in the living room until he heard snoring sounds coming from the master bedroom. He followed the snoring sounds to the bedroom, where he found Maupin and Northup asleep.

Marsh stood over the couple's bed for about 10 minutes and watched them sleep while deciding how he would kill them. During his confession, Marsh described feeling "nervous but excited and exhilarated" as he did this. It was at this point that Maupin awoke, saw Marsh, and began screaming. Marsh then began stabbing her in the torso. As she was being stabbed to death Maupin screamed for help and begged Marsh to stop. Marsh later told investigators that her cries for help motivated him to attack her more. Marsh later recalled that "the old lady just would not die". When Northup awoke, Marsh stabbed him until he knew he was dead. Marsh later told investigators that he continued stabbing Northup and Maupin after they were deceased, saying, "it just felt right". Maupin suffered 74 wounds around her body, including 67 stab wounds. One of the stab wounds knocked out her tooth. Northup suffered 65 separate wounds ranging from his head to his legs. Sixty-one of those were stab wounds. In total, Marsh inflicted over 128 stab wounds on his victims.

In addition to murdering Maupin and Northup, Marsh mutilated their bodies. He cut the deceased victims' bodies open and examined and experimented on them. He also disemboweled them—according to first responders who were at the crime scene, Maupin and Northup's organs had been removed from their bodies. Marsh tried to take Maupin's eye out with the knife but found this to be too difficult. He pulled fat out of her leg and torso and cut open Northup's forehead out of curiosity. He also inserted a cellphone into Maupin's abdomen and a drinking glass into Northup's abdomen. During Marsh's interrogation, he stated that he placed the items inside the victims' bodies to "fuck with" the people who would later investigate the murders.

According to Marsh, committing the murders gave him the most enjoyable feeling he had ever experienced. This feeling, he told investigators, was heightened when the victims were conscious and resisting. Marsh also told investigators that the positive feeling was better than sex and lingered for weeks. Marsh kept souvenirs from the crime—the knife used to murder and mutilate the couple, and the bloody clothing he wore during the attacks. Marsh also planned to commit more murders. He wandered the streets looking for victims but could not find any. During these expeditions, he armed himself with a baseball bat. He planned on murdering his next victims with the bat so that the crimes would not be associated with the stabbing murders of Maupin and Northup.

== Investigation ==
On the morning of April 14, Maupin and Northup were absent from church, prompting concerns from their family. Northup's daughter Mary tried calling them but received no answer. Northup also failed to show up for a gig with his local folk band. Northup's son Robert and one of his grandsons then visited the couple's home. They left, believing Maupin and Northup were out of town. It was later that evening that Maupin's daughter Laura and police went to the couple's home. Laura rang the doorbell but received no answer. She then went around back, finding one of the windows open with its screen slashed. Looking through the bedroom window, she saw bloodstains. The police were able to see the victims' bodies through the window using a flashlight. They forced entry and made the gruesome discovery. Investigators, including 25 FBI agents, tried to solve the murders. However, no physical evidence could be found. Marsh left no DNA, fingerprints, or footprints. Marsh would only be apprehended after bragging about the murders.

On April 14, Marsh bragged to a close friend that he had committed the murders. The next day, he confessed again to his friend and to others during lunch. After school, he asked his girlfriend if she had heard about the murders. When she said no, Marsh began proudly describing the crime, giving details about the manner in which he had murdered Northup and Maupin, and smiling and explaining how great he had felt. The girlfriend initially did not believe Marsh. The next day, Marsh described his crime again to a close friend, smiling, and claiming it was the best experience he had ever had. On April 16, Marsh's friend inquired about the murders. Marsh again described the crime as the "best feeling in his life". He showed his friend several items, including the knife used to commit the murders and the gloves, ski cap, boots, and jacket he had worn during the murders. The friend later testified that he did not know how to respond. Marsh's friend and girlfriend spoke with each other about what Marsh had told them. However, they did not initially report the confessions to anyone else, as they feared Marsh. Marsh's friend eventually informed the school that Marsh was carrying a knife around campus, which resulted in Marsh's suspension.

Marsh's girlfriend broke up with him on June 4, because she felt "intimidated" by him. One or two weeks later, at around midnight, Marsh sneaked into her house through the dog door, an action that caused the girlfriend to fear for her life. The girlfriend told Marsh's friend about the incident. The friend then told Marsh's father about the murders, but Marsh's father did not believe him. Marsh's friend then went to the police. He later told CBS 48 Hours that he made the decision to contact police because Marsh had threatened to kill again. Marsh's friend was questioned at the police station for several hours. Marsh was arrested the next day on June 17.

=== Arrest and interrogation ===
On June 17, a high school resource officer brought Marsh in for questioning. Marsh was then interrogated by Davis detective Ariel Pineda and FBI special agent Chris Campion. At first, he denied involvement in the murders and tried to talk his way through the situation. He sobbed and pleaded with Campion to believe him. Finally, after three hours and 38 minutes of questioning, and being faced with damning recordings, Marsh began to confess. "I – that night I just – I couldn't take it anymore. I had to do it. I lost control," Marsh said. Marsh admitted to hunting for someone to kill and to breaking into the couple's home. He stated that he "went to their bedroom, I opened the door, then I just kind of stood over their bed, watching them sleep for a few minutes...My body was trembling. I was ... nervous but excited and exhilarated. I was actually gonna do it, I was there, it was finally happening."

Marsh then described in graphic detail how he murdered the couple and mutilated their bodies. "I cut open both of their torsos, you around here [points to two areas of his chest], and in the woman I put a phone inside of her and I put a cup inside the guy." During his interrogation, Marsh admitted that he got a positive feeling from committing the murders, saying, "It was pure happiness, and adrenaline and dopamine, just all of it, rushing over me", and "I'm not gonna lie. It felt amazing.” He also stated that this positive feeling was "the most exhilarating, enjoyable feeling I've ever felt." This positive feeling, Marsh explained, was heightened when Maupin and Northup were conscious and resisting. He also admitted that the great feeling the murders gave him lingered for weeks.

During his interrogation, Marsh stated, "I don't feel sympathy for other people – at all. Don't feel empathy for them." After Marsh made a full confession, Campion asked him "You mentioned that pretty much everybody you meet you have thoughts about killing them and how you would kill them...So how would you kill me?" Marsh answered, "Just a lot of ways. ... Choking you to death with your tie...Beating your face into the mirror until it broke and using the glass to cut your arteries, gouging your eyes out, and just smashing your face into the wall. Nothing personal." Marsh also told investigators, "all the evidence you need" was in his mother's garage. Investigators later searched the garage, finding the bloody clothing Marsh had worn during the murders and the knife used to commit them. He had kept them as souvenirs.

== Legal proceedings ==
Marsh was charged with two counts of first-degree murder with special enhancements for: intentionally killing more than one person; demonstrating exceptional depravity in the killings; lying in wait to kill the victims; and inflicting torture in the commission of the murders. He also faced enhancements for the use of a deadly weapon during the murders. He pleaded not guilty. Marsh later changed the plea from not guilty to not guilty by reason of insanity. Marsh's defense attorneys had him examined by psychiatrist Matthew Soulier. When Soulier and Marsh met, Marsh threatened to kill him. Soulier found Marsh to be mentally ill but sane. Marsh's attorneys continued with the insanity defense.

Following an evidentiary hearing, Marsh's attorneys filed a motion to suppress his June 17, 2013, confession, arguing that the interrogation began under false pretenses and that Marsh had made repeated requests to go home. Prosecutors, the defense argued, had failed to meet the standard that the confession was voluntary and that Marsh, despite being read his Miranda rights, intelligently waived those rights. Yolo Superior Court Judge David Reed denied the motion. Reed also denied a motion made by prosecutors, which argued that the defense withheld discoverable evidence until days before the trial was set to begin.

Marsh's trial began on September 2, 2014. Marsh, then 17, was tried as an adult. Reed presided over the trial. Assistant Chief Deputy DA Michael Cabral and Deputy DA Amanda Zambor prosecuted Marsh while Deputy Public Defender Ron Johnson defended him. The jury consisted of eight women and four men. The trial lasted five weeks.

Marsh's defense team claimed that the side-effects of the medication he took combined with mental illness triggered uncontrollable violence and rendered him temporarily insane. Prosecutors argued that Marsh was cunning and manipulative and committed the murders in a premeditated and carefully planned manner. During the trial, jurors heard from numerous witnesses, including investigators, a forensic pathologist, and Marsh's friends and ex-girlfriend. They also heard from psychiatrists and therapists who had treated Marsh.

On September 26, 2014, after under two hours of deliberating, the jury reached a verdict: guilty on both counts of first-degree murder and all special circumstances. Next, jurors had to determine if Marsh was sane or insane. On September 30, the jury found that Marsh was, in fact, sane when he committed the murders.

Although Marsh was tried as an adult, his juvenile status made him ineligible for the death penalty and life in prison without parole. The maximum sentence Marsh faced was 52 years to life. Marsh's defense attorneys argued that he should be sentenced to 25 years to life. The maximum sentence, they argued, would constitute cruel and unusual punishment when imposed on a juvenile. Prosecutors argued for the maximum sentence, with Cabral saying, "This case screams out for 52 years to life. Nothing else would be appropriate." Cabral also stated that in the 28 years he had been a prosecutor "never have I seen such a heinous and reprehensible act, and never have I seen a defendant with such an evil soul." During the sentencing hearing, Maupin and Northup's family members gave victim impact statements. Maupin's eldest daughter Victoria Hurd stated: "She lived her life loving people, always willing to lend a hand, a shoulder or an ear...If she were here, she would help us survive this. ... But she is not here, because Daniel Marsh killed my mother for his own perverse gratification." Northup's son James spoke about how the news of the murders shattered the joy of his granddaughter's birth and how the trauma caused by the murders led him to experience anxiety, sleeplessness, and a recurrence of ALS that had previously been in remission.

Reed chose to sentence Marsh to the maximum term of life in prison with parole eligibility after 52 years. Specifically, Marsh was given 25 years to life for each count of murder plus two years for special enhancements. During sentencing, Reed pointed out that Marsh was proud of his crime and mutilated the victims' bodies out of curiosity. He also pointed out that Marsh's actions were not impetuous or recklessly impulsive and that he had attempted to commit more murders.

Even though Marsh was sentenced to 52 years to life, California law will allow him to be paroled after serving 25 years, when he is 42. In 2013, the California State Legislature passed Senate Bill 260. The bill was sponsored by Senator Loni Hancock and co-sponsored by Human Rights Watch, Youth Law Center, the Friends Committee on Legislation of California, and the Post-Conviction Justice Project of the University of Southern California. The law was subsequently signed by Governor Jerry Brown. It established a "youth offender parole hearing" mechanism for offenders who are incarcerated for crimes committed as juveniles. If the sentence for the prisoner's controlling offense is less than 25 years to life, they are eligible for release or parole during their 20th year of incarceration. If the sentence for their controlling offense is 25 years to life or greater, they are eligible to be released after 25 years.

== Legal changes and appeals ==
In 2016, California voters passed Proposition 57, which holds that juvenile court judges must decide whether juvenile offenders are tried in juvenile court or in adult court. In 2018, California's Supreme Court ruled that Proposition 57 could be applied retroactively to cases that had not yet been finalized. On February 22, 2018, the California Court of Appeal, Third Appellate District conditionally reversed Marsh's 2014 conviction pending a transfer hearing to determine if he should continue to serve his adult sentence. On June 21, 2018, prosecutors filed a juvenile petition alleging the same offenses and special allegations and a motion to transfer Marsh to adult court. The transfer hearing was presided over by family court Judge Samuel McAdam. However, new legal challenges arose when Governor Jerry Brown signed into law Senate Bill 1391, which prohibits juveniles under age 16 from being tried in adult court.

SB 1391 was opposed by prosecutors and by Maupin and Northup's families. The California District Attorneys Association held a press conference, which was led by Yolo County District Attorney Jeff Reisig and Sacramento County DA Anne Marie Schubert, in early September 2018, urging Governor Brown to veto SB 1391. The press conference featured family members of Maupin and Northup. Prosecutors wrote in a letter to Governor Brown: "Senate Bill 1391 eliminates the authority for a court to decide whether a 14- or 15-year-old charged with certain serious offenses is unfit for the juvenile system." The letter also contained information on Marsh, who had "savagely tortured and murdered an elderly couple in their home" and "methodically planned his attack, targeted the victims at random, and committed his heinous acts out of morbid curiosity."

Governor Brown signed SB 1391 into law on September 30, 2018, right before Marsh's transfer hearing began. In his signing message, Brown said that while victims' testimony weighed on him, there was a need for "redemption and reformation wherever possible." Brown also noted that: "Welfare and Institutions Code sections 1800 and 1800.5 allow either the Director of the Division of Juvenile Justice, or the Board of Juvenile Hearings, to petition for extended incarceration if a youth is deemed truly dangerous. This mechanism exists under current law, and has been used in the past when circumstances have warranted. It will continue to be used when needed, and there are no time limits prescribed in statute."

Marsh's defense team filed a motion for continuance of the hearing until after January when SB 1391 would be effective. Prosecutors argued against the motion, saying that the case was governed by current law. Reed denied the defense's motion and the hearing went forward. During the hearing, Marsh took the stand to argue for his case to stay in juvenile court. Prosecutors argued that Marsh should continue serving his adult sentence, as he was highly calculated in planning his crime, proclaimed that it gave him an exhilarating feeling, and tried on several occasions to commit more murders. Prosecutors called forensic psychologist and psychopathy expert Matthew Logan to take the stand. Logan testified that Marsh's score on the Psychopathy Checklist was 35.8 out of 40, one of the highest he had ever seen. Maupin and Northup's families also gave statements requesting that McAdam reinstate Marsh's adult sentence. Additionally, Davis citizens sent over 300 letters to the court opposing Marsh's remand to the juvenile justice system.

On October 24, 2018, McAdam ruled in favor of the prosecution and remanded Marsh to state prison to continue serving his adult sentence. In reaching his decision, McAdam considered the circumstances and gravity of the offense, the degree of criminal sophistication, Marsh's prior delinquent acts, Marsh's capacity for rehabilitation while in juvenile court jurisdiction, and Marsh's success of prior rehabilitation attempts. "By his own admission his main objective was to remain undetected and to become a serial killer," McAdam stated. "This was a highly sophisticated, extraordinary, and rare crime even for the most hardened and seasoned adult criminal." McAdam also stated: "There is no question that the crimes here were committed by a psychopath who was also suffering a mental illness. The more difficult question is whether Marsh is still a psychopath with criminal desires and whether that personality trait can be rehabilitated. As both experts pointed out, most psychopaths are not criminals."

On January 1, 2019, SB 1391 went into effect. On November 13, 2018, Marsh filed an extraordinary writ seeking review of the order of transfer. The issue raised was whether McAdam had abused discretion by holding the transfer hearing before SB 1391 went into effect. Marsh's defense team also argued that the court improperly shifted the burden on Marsh to show that he was fit for juvenile court treatment and misapplied the applicable time period to rehabilitation. The writ was denied on December 6. On December 14, Marsh filed a petition for review from the order denying writ with the California Supreme Court. The petition raised the same issues as the writ. On February 13, 2019, the California Supreme Court issued an order denying the writ without prejudice to any relief under SB 1391. In the summer of 2019, Marsh's attorney filed an appeal, asking for his murder conviction to be overturned retroactively due to SB 1391.

In O.G. v. The Superior Court of Ventura County, the California Supreme Court determined whether or not SB 1391 conflicts with Proposition 57. Proposition 57 gave sole authority to juvenile court judges to determine whether a juvenile age 14 and older should be tried in adult criminal court. The proposition expressly authorized the Legislature to amend the measure as long as the amendments are "consistent with and further the intent" of the act. Opponents of SB 1391 argue that it unconstitutionally amended Proposition 57 by repealing prosecutors' authority to seek the transfer of 14 and 15-year-old offenders to adult court. Proponents of SB 1391 argue that the law does not conflict with Proposition 57 and that keeping 14 and 15-year-old offenders out of adult court is good public policy. On February 25, 2021, the California Supreme Court upheld SB 1391.

Marsh's attorneys argue that SB 1391 should apply retroactively to him as judgment in his case is not finalized. The California Attorney General's Office and the Yolo County prosecutors argue that SB 1391 does not apply to Marsh. Judgment in Marsh's case, they say, became final with an appellate ruling in June 2018 before SB 1391 took effect. Prosecutors also argue that Marsh remains an "extreme danger." Oral arguments before the Third District Court of Appeal were held on August 18, 2021. In September, the Third District Court dismissed Marsh's appeal. Had the court determined that SB 1391 applied in Marsh's case, Marsh, now aged 25, would have been released from incarceration upon reaching his 25th birthday.

== Aftermath ==
The murders of Maupin and Northup attracted national attention and were featured on the 48 Hours program. On May 16, 2018, a YouTube video of Marsh giving a Ted Talk was uploaded. In the talk, which is titled "Embracing our Humanity," Marsh spoke of alleged hardships he had experienced and declared that he was reformed and deserving of another chance. He also stated, "I came to realize that there are no such things as evil people in this world. Only damaged people." The video was deeply upsetting to Maupin and Northup's families and was taken off YouTube within two days.

Marsh remains incarcerated at Richard J. Donovan Correctional Facility in San Diego and is eligible for parole in December 2036.

== See also ==
- List of homicides in California
- List of youngest killers
