= 2012 Oikos University shooting =

Mass shooting in California, U.S.

- Location: 37°44′30″N 122°12′09″W; 7850 Edgewater Dr; Oakland, California, U.S.
- Date: April 2, 2012 c. 10:30 – 10:33 a.m. (PDT)
- Target: Staff and students at Oikos University
- Attack type: School shooting; mass shooting; mass murder
- Weapon: .45 ACP Springfield Armory XD semi-automatic pistol
- Deaths: 7
- Injuries: 3
- Perpetrator: One L. Goh

On April 2, 2012, 43-year-old One L. Goh killed seven people and injured three others at Oikos University, a Korean Christian college in Oakland, California, United States. It is the deadliest mass killing in the city's history.

== Incident ==
The shooting occurred at approximately 10:30 a.m. Pacific Daylight Time, when a gunman opened fire with a .45-caliber semi-automatic handgun with four fully loaded 10-round magazines on the university's campus, located at the Airport Business park in East Oakland, near Oakland International Airport. The gunman stood up in a nursing classroom while class was in session, ordered classmates to line up against the wall, and fired at them. The shooter was reported to have said "Get in line ... I'm going to kill you all!" before opening fire, according to a witness. Six students and a receptionist were killed, and three others injured (six of the seven fatalities were women). The attacker continued to fire shots as he fled the campus, driving away in a car belonging to one of the victims. Police say that he used "most" of the 40 bullets that he started with. Hours later, he surrendered to authorities at a Safeway supermarket in the nearby South Shore area of Alameda, about 5 miles (8 km) away from the scene of the shooting.

== Perpetrator ==
One L. Goh
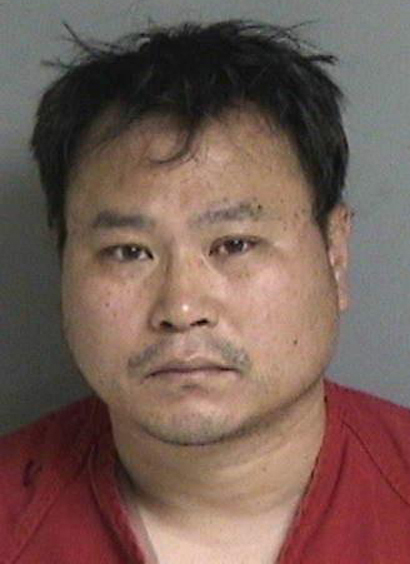
- Born: Su Nam Ko; November 18, 1968; Seoul, South Korea
- Died: March 20, 2019 (aged 50); Folsom State Prison, Folsom, California, U.S.
- Other names: One Goh Ko, One Ko Goh
- Citizenship: United States
- Occupation: Former nursing student

Korean name
- Hangul: 고원일
- RR: Go Wonil
- MR: Ko Wŏnil

Birth name
- Hangul: 고수남
- RR: Go Sunam
- MR: Ko Sunam

One L. Goh (born Su Nam Ko; Korean: 고원일; also One Goh Ko or One Ko Goh; November 18, 1968 – March 20, 2019), a 43-year-old former student at Oikos University, was identified as the shooter. He was residing in Oakland at the time of the attack. A native of South Korea, he followed his parents and two older brothers to the United States at a young age and was later naturalized as a U.S. citizen in 2000. When Goh arrived in the United States, he first resided in Springfield, a community in Fairfax County, Virginia, outside of Washington, D.C., and then moved to Hayes, in rural Southeast Virginia, where he had minor traffic citations and debts. In February 2002, he legally changed his name to One Goh because he felt his birth name sounded "like a girl's name."

Goh later moved from Virginia to the San Francisco Bay Area, where he took up residence in Castro Valley and Oakland. His mother Oak-Chul Kim also lived in Oakland, while his brother Su-Wan Ko, a non-commissioned officer in the United States Army, and another brother Su-Kwon remained in Virginia. On March 8, 2011, Su-Wan was killed in an automobile accident in Virginia while on assignment for the George C. Marshall Center. Later that year, his mother returned to Seoul, South Korea, where she died as well. While a student at Oikos University, Goh had disciplinary problems, and was asked to leave the school a few months prior to the shooting.

Howard Jordan, the chief of the Oakland Police Department, said that Goh was angry at the administration after being expelled from the university, as well as having his request for a pro-rated tuition fee reversal on his $6,000 payment denied by Ellen Cervellon, one of the school's administrators. School officials later said he had not been expelled. Jordan said Goh went to Oikos with "the intent of locating [an] administrator", but when learning she was not there, he opened fire at random people. Jordan said Goh "was also upset that students in the past, when he attended the school, mistreated him, disrespected him, and things of that nature."

Goh died on March 20, 2019, while in custody at California State Prison-Sacramento. The Sacramento County coroner's office investigated the cause of Goh's death. As of April 9, 2019, the coroner did not release the results of its investigation.

== Hearings ==
Goh was arraigned before Judge Sandra Bean of the Alameda County Superior Court on April 4 and charged with seven counts of murder and three counts of attempted murder, but did not enter a plea at the time. In interviews, Goh apologized for the shooting, stating that he did not remember many parts of the day in question and that it was difficult for him to speak about it. He was also hospitalized, and began refusing to eat; three weeks after his arrest, county sheriffs reportedly considered the possibility of obtaining a court order to have him fed forcibly through a feeding tube. Goh later resumed eating, though he had lost 20 pounds (9.1 kg). On April 30, he appeared before Judge Bean again and entered a not guilty plea through his public defender David Klaus. If convicted, Goh would be eligible for the death penalty under California law due to enhanced penalties for special circumstances which could apply to his case, including the commission of multiple murders and the commission of murder during a carjacking.

Goh's pre-trial hearing was originally scheduled for June 30. It was eventually held on October 1 before Judge Carrie Panetta. Klaus argued that Goh was not mentally competent to stand trial, and so Panetta ordered that the hearing be adjourned until November 16 so that a competency evaluation could be conducted. Goh used the services of a Korean interpreter during the hearing, and briefly disrupted the proceedings with an outburst when Klaus began speaking about Goh's mental competence. The court appointed two psychiatrists to evaluate Goh. The hearing resumed on November 19 to discuss the report of the first psychiatrist, which was completed on schedule. According to Klaus' statements, that report concluded that Goh had had paranoid schizophrenia for up to a decade and a half, and that he lacked the ability to cooperate with his public defender due to his incomprehension of the criminal justice system. The report of the second psychiatrist was not yet complete by that time, so proceedings were again suspended until January 7, 2013. Goh refused medication while in jail.

The second psychiatrist's report presented at the January 7, 2013, hearing also concluded that Goh had had paranoid schizophrenia. On that basis, Panetta ruled that Goh was unfit to stand trial, and ordered that he be confined to a mental institution for treatment, with further competency reviews to be held every ninety days. An additional hearing was scheduled for January 28, 2013. Alameda County District Attorney Nancy O'Malley has not yet concluded whether she will seek the death penalty for Goh if and when he goes to trial.

On August 26, 2014, an Alameda County grand jury indicted Goh on seven counts of murder and three counts of attempted murder but as of September 9, 2014, he was still assessed as mentally incompetent for trial. During a hearing on December 2, 2015, Goh expressed his wish for the death penalty, though the attorneys on both sides are unsure whether he feels genuine guilt or still has delusions.

In May 2017, Goh pleaded no contest in the shooting. On July 14, 2017, Goh was sentenced to seven consecutive life sentences plus 271 years in prison, all without any possibility of parole. On March 20, 2019, Goh died in prison.

== Victims ==
Seven people were killed, and three more were wounded.

=== Fatalities ===
The six students and one staff member killed were:

- Tshering Rinzing Bhutia, 38
- Doris Chibuko, 40
- Sonam Choedon, 33
- Grace Eunhae Kim, 23
- Katleen Ping, 24
- Judith Seymour, 53
- Lydia Sim, 21

== See also ==
- List of school shootings in the United States by death toll
- List of school mass shootings in the United States
- List of attacks related to post-secondary schools
- List of homicides in California
- School shooting
