= Gypsy Hill killings =

Serial homicides in California, 1976

San Mateo slasher
- Other name: The San Mateo Slasher
- Wanted by: FBI, local police
- Wanted since: January 8, 1976; 50 years ago

Details
- Victims: 5+
- Span of crimes: January – March 1976
- Country: United States
- State: California
- Location: San Mateo County
- Target: Young females
- Weapon: Knives
- Date apprehended: January 22, 2015

The Gypsy Hill killings were a group of five homicides of young women and girls in San Mateo County, California, during early 1976. The killer became known in the media as the "San Mateo Slasher." It was later proven that there were at least two different perpetrators with Rodney Halbower convicted of the murders of Baxter, Cascio and Michelle Mitchell and Leon Seymour being convicted in the sole murder of Lampe. It is believed Blackwell and Booth were killed by Halbower, but there's no evidence yet to tie him to those cases and Friedman's murder is also unsolved with these killings being partially unresolved.

== Killings ==
On January 8, 1976, the body of 18-year-old Veronica Cascio was discovered in a creek on the grounds of the Sharp Park Golf Course in Pacifica. She had been stabbed 30 times. A transient was arrested but was released for lack of evidence.

A few weeks later, 14-year-old Tatiana Blackwell was reported missing after leaving her home in Pacifica to run an errand. A body, later identified as hers, was discovered off Sharp Park Road in the Gypsy Hills section of the city on June 6. She had also been stabbed multiple times.

Paula Baxter, 17 years old, went missing on Wednesday evening February 4, after finishing a play rehearsal on the Capuchino High School campus, leaving her mired car behind. Her nude body was found on February 6 in Millbrae behind the Church of Jesus Christ of Latter-day Saints on Ludeman Lane. She had been stabbed 4 times, sexually assaulted, and hit on the head with a piece of concrete. Her killing was forensically linked to Cascio's.

On April 1, 19-year-old Denise Lampe of Broadmoor was found dead after a search in the parking lot of the Serramonte Center. She had been stabbed 20 times.

Carol Booth, 26, was reported missing by her husband on March 15, and was discovered in a shallow grave near Colma Creek on Grand Avenue in South San Francisco on May 6.

== Victims ==
The five victims were:

- Veronica "Ronnie" Cascio
- Tatiana Marie "Tanya" Blackwell
- Paula Louise Baxter
- Carol Lee Booth
- Denise Lampe

== Possible victims ==
=== Michelle Mitchell ===
Mitchell, 19, was last seen alive in Reno, Nevada, on February 24, 1976, when her Volkswagen Beetle broke down at the intersection of 9th Street and Evans Avenue. Witnesses reported seeing someone help push her vehicle into the parking lot across from the UNR agricultural building on Evans Street.

Her body was discovered that evening in a garage on East 9th Street with her hands bound and her throat slashed. Three years later, Cathy Woods, a psychiatric patient at the Louisiana State University Medical Center, confessed to having murdered a woman named Michelle. Woods was charged and convicted of murdering Michelle Mitchell. She was released from prison in 2015, 35 years later, at the age of 68 after DNA evidence cleared her. Cathy Woods is the longest-ever wrongfully imprisoned woman in US history. This DNA evidence would incriminate Rodney Halbower who was connected to two of the Gypsy Hill killings also being Michelle's killer thus showing her murder was connected to these batch of murders when previously it was only suspected to be.

=== Idell M. Friedman ===
Friedman, 21, an employee of an import firm, was found assaulted and stabbed to death with an 8-inch-knife in her apartment at 116 Fairmount Street in San Francisco. She was murdered on March 17, 1976, only two days after Gypsy Hill victim Carol Lee Booth was reported missing.

Friedman's nude body was lying on the kitchen floor of her ransacked apartment. She was found by a co-worker who became concerned when Friedman did not show up for work.

== Investigation and arrests ==
Investigators have connected some of the homicides to each other. All the slain women were young brunettes and most had experienced car trouble prior to being murdered. All the bodies were found in wooded areas.

A lack of witnesses and forensic evidence stalled the investigations.

In March 2014, the FBI established a task force to re-examine the murders, after new DNA evidence cast doubt on the conviction of Cathy Woods, now 64, for Mitchell's murder. The DNA taken from a cigarette butt found at the Mitchell crime scene matched DNA taken from semen found at related crime scenes in San Mateo, California. This DNA was that of a man and therefore might exonerate Woods.

On September 8, 2014, the FBI named Rodney Halbower as a person of interest in the Gypsy Hill murders. Woods was released from prison on September 11 pending a new trial to take place on July 13, 2015. In March 2015, prosecutors dismissed the charges against Woods.

On January 22, 2015, Halbower was charged with two of the murders (Paula Baxter and Veronica Cascio). DNA evidence linked him to both. On November 8, 2017, Leon Melvin Seymour was charged with the murder of Denise Lampe, based on DNA evidence. On September 18, 2018, Halbower was convicted of the murders of Cascio and Baxter. Finally, on October 10, 2018, Halbower was sentenced to two consecutive life sentences without the possibility of parole for the murders of Cascio and Baxter.

Halbower will most likely face a trial in Nevada for the murder of Michelle Mitchell in the near future.

The murders of Tanya Blackwell and Carol Lee Booth are both believed to have been committed by Rodney Halbower, but there was not enough evidence to charge him for their deaths.

== See also ==
- List of fugitives from justice who disappeared
- List of serial killers in the United States

== Bibliography ==
- Michael Newton (January 1, 2006). The Encyclopedia of Serial Killers. Infobase Publishing. p. 460. ISBN 978-0-8160-6987-3.
