= 2012 College Station shooting =

Mass shooting in Texas, U.S.

- Location: College Station, Texas, US
- Date: August 13, 2012 c. 12:11 – 12:35 p.m.
- Attack type: Mass shooting, shootout, mass murder
- Weapons: Vz 58 Tactical Sporter 7.62×39mm semi-automatic rifle; Mosin–Nagant M91/30 7.62×54mmR bolt-action rifle; .40-caliber SIG Sauer P226 semi-automatic pistol (stolen); PSL 7.62×54mmR designated marksman rifle
- Deaths: 3 (including the perpetrator)
- Injuries: 4
- Perpetrator: Thomas Alton Caffall III

On August 13, 2012, a local constable was shot and killed in College Station, Texas, United States, by the man to whom he was serving a legal notice. Other officers came to the scene and engaged in a shootout that lasted for approximately thirty minutes, during which one bystander was killed and officers were injured. The suspect, who was shot and fatally wounded in the gunfight, was later identified as 35-year-old Thomas Alton Caffall III. Police found a Vz 58 Tactical Sporter rifle, a Mosin–Nagant M91/30 rifle with a bayonet, a .40-caliber SIG Sauer P226 pistol stolen from a police officer, and a PSL rifle with a scope in his house after the shooting.

== Shootout ==
The shooting began near Texas A&M University around 12:30 p.m. when 41-year-old Brazos County Constable Brian Bachmann arrived at the house of Thomas Caffall with the intention to serve a notice for him to appear in court on August 23 due to a failure to pay $1,250 in back rent. Caffall apparently became outraged by this and opened fire as the officer approached his home, fatally wounding Bachmann. He then stole Bachmann's .40-caliber SIG Sauer P226 pistol and also shot and injured 51-year-old Barbara Holdsworth as she parked her vehicle in a driveway half a block from Caffall's home. Holdsworth's boyfriend witnessed the shooting and made the first call to 9-1-1.

Numerous officers arrived at the scene at 12:14 p.m. and engaged in a shootout with Caffall that lasted for approximately thirty minutes. In this exchange of gunfire, three officers and a bystander were hit; the wounds of the bystander, 51-year-old Chris Northcliffe, were fatal. EMS was pulled away from Chris Northcliffe as they were beginning treatment because of the gunfire from the shootout. The shootout ended with Caffall's death from gunshots fired by police at 12:35 p.m. A "code maroon" was issued during the shooting at the university after multiple people were shot, according to police spokesperson Rhonda Seaton. A total of 65 rounds were fired by Caffall during the shootout.

=== Aftermath ===
Early reports of the incident indicated six people were wounded and that the shooter was taken into custody. Later reports indicated that a law enforcement officer and a civilian were both killed by gunfire, and at least three others, including some who may not have been injured by gunfire, were wounded. At least two fatalities, one law enforcement officer and one civilian, were reported, and another civilian and a College Station police officer were also reported injured in the shooting.

Brian Bachmann was identified as the slain police officer by College Station Police Department Assistant Police Chief Scott McCollum. Bachmann was the elected Constable for Precinct 1 in Brazos County, Texas, and he had been a Brazos County Sheriff's Deputy since 1993, according to the Facebook page for his 2010 Constable's Campaign. Christopher Northcliffe was then identified as the deceased civilian.

== Victims ==
=== Fatalities ===
- Brian Bachmann (41), officer
- Chris Northcliffe (43), civilian
- Thomas Alton Caffall III (35), gunman

=== Injuries ===
- Justin Oehlke, an officer who was shot in the calf
- Brad Smith, an officer who suffered shrapnel injuries
- Phil Dorsett, an officer who suffered shrapnel injuries
- Barbara Holdsworth (51), a civilian who was seriously wounded and hospitalized

== Perpetrator ==
The shooter was identified as 35-year-old gun collector Thomas Alton Caffall III. He was confirmed to not be a student of Texas A&M nor a school employee. Caffall's stepfather, Richard Weaver, revealed in an interview that his son was recently refusing to work and had quit his job nine months prior to the shooting. He also described Caffall as regularly playing video games, which seemed to distort his sense of reality. Caffall's other family also specified that he was suffering from some sort of mental illness. Prior to the shooting, Caffall posted photos of his gun collection on his Facebook profile.

== Reaction ==
Texas Governor Rick Perry, a Texas A&M alumnus, gave a statement during an event in Florida, saying that his "prayers are with any of those that have been injured." A&M President R. Bowen Loftin also described the day as a "sad day in the Bryan-College Station community." Caffall's family also issued statements of apology, with his sister Courtney Clark saying, "Our hearts and prayers go out to the families and this is just a senseless tragedy...We are just distraught by the havoc that he has caused."

A justice of the peace was asked why only the assailants family was authorized to pick up his dead body. In a newspaper, he is quoted as responding: “I’m not going to let the county be out the expense of going and picking up his nasty-ass body. If it cost us $200 to go pick him up, I’m not going to pay for it. The family can take care of that. I have no sympathy for him or the family.” The justice of the peace later apologized in the same newspaper for what he said.
