= Murder of Suzanne Bombardier =

American murder case

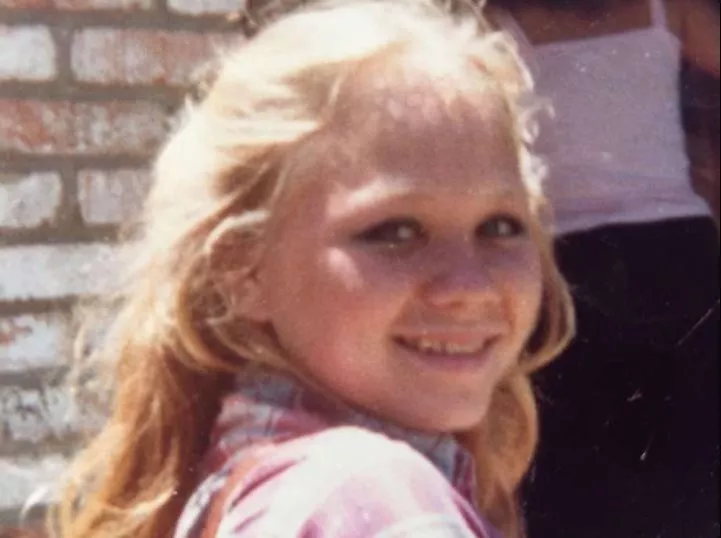
- Suzanne Bombardier
- Location: 38.000079°N 121.848873°W; Antioch, California, U.S.
- Date: June 22, 1980 (Pacific Time Zone)
- Weapon: Knife
- Victim: Suzanne Bombardier
- Perpetrator: Mitchell Lynn Bacom
- Charges: Kidnapping, sodomy, oral copulation, rape, murder, murder with use of a deadly weapon

Suzanne Arlene "Suzie" Bombardier (March 14, 1966 – June 22, 1980) was an American teenager who was kidnapped, raped, and stabbed to death on June 22, 1980. On June 27, her body was found by a fisherman, floating in the San Joaquin River east of Antioch, California near its bridge, 60 miles (97 km) east of San Francisco. On December 11, 2017, after extensive DNA profiling, 63-year-old Mitchell Lynn Bacom, a convicted sex offender, was arrested as the prime suspect. He was charged with and convicted of kidnapping, rape, oral copulation, murder, and murder with use of a deadly weapon. This was Antioch's oldest cold case murder. At the time of Bombardier's homicide, Bacom was known to her family.

Bombardier was raped, stabbed in the chest, and her heart was punctured. She was kidnapped from her sister's townhome in Antioch while she was babysitting her nieces. Her sister, Stephanie Mullen, arrived home at 4:00 a.m. to find Bombardier missing. Bombardier's father, Ted, said that she must have known her killer as there was no forced entry.

== Background ==
Fourteen-year-old Bombardier was an honor roll student at Antioch Junior High at the time of her homicide. She also belonged to the California Junior Scholastic Federation. She was buried at Queen of Heaven Cemetery in Lafayette. Jennifer Kathleen Gibbons came across her grave in 2014 and started blogging about the unsolved case. This kept it top of mind for the public and later for investigators.

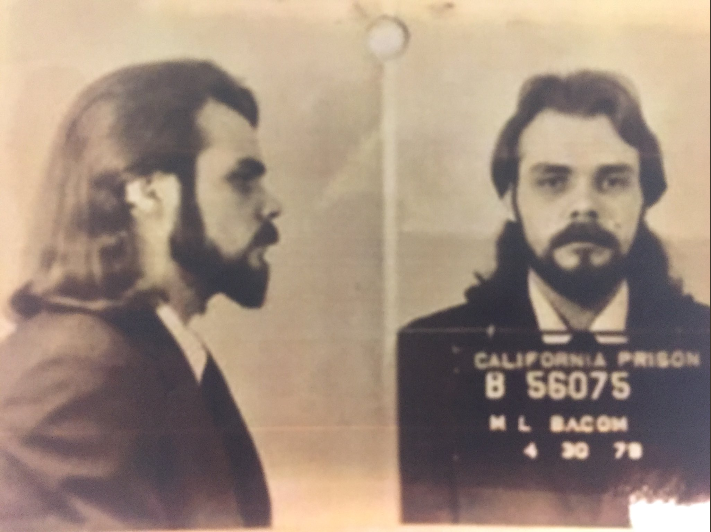
Bacom's mug shot, 1974

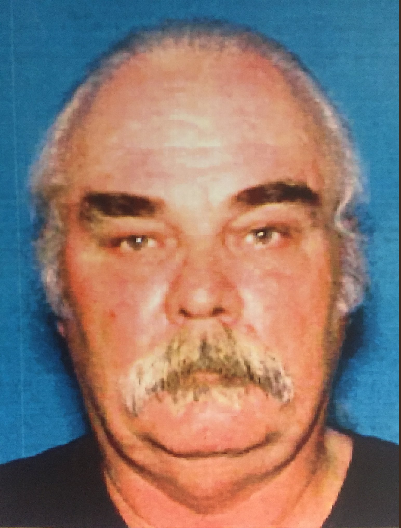
Bacom's California driver's license photo

In 2015, DNA samples from Bombardier's case were sent to the San Mateo County Sheriff's Office Forensic Laboratory for them to create a DNA profile. In early 2017, after advancements in DNA analysis technology, Antioch police were notified that a CODIS hit was made that tentatively identified Bacom as the perpetrator. After additional testing, when the samples were conclusively linked to Bacom through a federal DNA database, he was taken into custody without incident at his home.

== Perpetrator ==
Mitchell Lynn Bacom (born March 21, 1954), a native of Knightsen, California, was a suspect in the case for a long time. In 2017, after linking Bacom to Bombardier's murder, authorities announced plans to attempt to match Bacom's DNA to other cold cases.

In 1973, Bacom was tried for several crimes, convicted, and sentenced to five years to life imprisonment. In 1981, he was convicted for several more crimes and sentenced to 24 years in prison. In 2002, he failed to register as a sex offender and was sentenced to four years in prison.

On March 15, 2022, a Contra Costa jury convicted Bacom of Bombardier's murder. He was convicted of first-degree murder, along with special circumstances for the commission of the murder during the course of the burglary, kidnapping, and rape.

Bacom was sentenced to life in prison without the possibility of parole on June 27, 2022. At the sentencing hearing, prosecutors said Bacom allegedly confessed to a former cellmate that he "raped and sliced" sex workers across the country when he was a truck driver.

== See also ==
- List of kidnappings
- List of solved missing person cases (pre-1950)
