= Murders of Ming Qu and Ying Wu =

On April 11, 2012, in Los Angeles, California, US

- Wu (left) and Qu
- Location: 2700 Raymond Avenue, Los Angeles, California, United States
- Date: April 11, 2012; 1:00 a.m. (PST)
- Attack type: Double murder, shooting, robbery
- Deaths: 2
- Perpetrators: Javier Bolden; Bryan Barnes
- Convictions: First-degree murder under special circumstances (2 counts)

On April 11, 2012, Chinese graduate students Ming Qu and Ying Wu were murdered by two men in Los Angeles, California. The pair had been sitting in a car parked 1 mile (1.6 km) outside of the University of Southern California (USC) campus. The murders sparked safety concerns around the campus in South Los Angeles, an area notorious for its history of crime-ridden neighborhoods.

The two perpetrators, African American men Javier Bolden and Bryan Barnes, aged 19 and 20 at the time of the shooting, were arrested in connection with the murders. In February 2014, Barnes was found guilty of murder and sentenced to life imprisonment without parole. In October of the same year, Bolden was also found guilty, and in November was sentenced to life imprisonment without parole.

== Background ==
Ming Qu (Chinese: 瞿铭) was from Jilin City. He had previously studied information engineering at Beijing University of Aeronautics and Astronautics. Shortly before his death, Qu had secured an internship in Beijing and was set to return to China on May 1.

Ying Wu (Chinese: 吴颖) was from Changde, Hunan. She had previously studied at the School of Electrical Engineering at Beijing Jiaotong University.

In 2010, Qu and Wu enrolled at USC School of Engineering to complete a master's degree in electrical engineering. Both lived off-campus with roommates as they were unable to afford USC dormitories. Qu and Wu were 23 years old at the time of their death.

== Details ==
On the night of April 11, 2012, Qu and Wu stayed late at the University of Southern California, separately studying for projects at the library. At about 12:30 a.m., they left the university and entered Qu's car, a 2003 BMW, and drove towards Wu's apartment on the 2700 block of Raymond Avenue in the Adams-Normandie neighborhood, arriving there shortly before 1:00 a.m. Qu intended to drop Wu off and head for his own residence, but upon arrival, they ended up staying inside the car to continue a conversation on the parking lot.

At about 1:00 a.m., Bolden and Barnes approached the car, openly wielding firearms. Qu managed to get out of the car and run to a nearby home where he pounded on the door but was shot several times in the head. Wu was killed by a single shot to the chest while she was sitting in the front passenger's seat. At the time of the shooting, it was raining heavily, creating challenging conditions at the crime scene. Qu and Wu were both taken to California Hospital Medical Center in downtown Los Angeles, where they were both pronounced dead on arrival.

=== Arrests ===
Police traced Wu's cell phone taken by the perpetrators from the scene of the shooting. On May 18, 2012, tracking of the device led to the arrest of Bryan Barnes, 20 years old, who was living near USC's campus in the South Los Angeles area. A second suspect, 19-year-old Javier Bolden, a resident of Palmdale, was detained that day. They were both charged with two counts of murder.

Bolden and Barnes were also charged with attempted murder in an unrelated shooting in December 2011 at a party in South Los Angeles, which left a woman seriously wounded and a man paralyzed.

Officials also suspect Barnes of firing multiple rounds at a party on February 12, wounding a 20-year-old man. The two were eligible for the death penalty according to prosecutors.

== Aftermath ==
=== Legal proceedings ===
Bryan Barnes pleaded guilty to two counts of murder on February 25, 2014, and was immediately sentenced to life in prison without possibility of parole. Barnes also admitted two so-called special circumstances that could have made him eligible for the death penalty. Co-defendant Javier Bolden was convicted in October 2014 and sentenced to life without parole.

=== Response ===
About one thousand people gathered at a memorial in mourning for the two victims at the Shrine Auditorium the following week of the shooting. Los Angeles Chinese Consul General Qiu Shaofang made the following statement: "The ministry of foreign affairs, ministry of education and the Consulate General of the People’s Republic of China in Los Angeles acted immediately after the tragedy happened and have committed [to] join efforts in tackling problems arising from the incident."

=== Criticism ===
The area surrounding University of Southern California's campus is an urban, low income community that has a historically high hate crime rate.

The parents of the two students filed a lawsuit against the school for misrepresenting security on campus. The lawsuit was dismissed by Los Angeles County Superior Court Judge Michael Johnson in February 2013. Johnson found no connection between the killings and the university's self-reported efforts to protect students, stating that "causation is an insurmountable issue for the plaintiffs."

== See also ==
- List of homicides in California
