= List of shootings in California =

This is a list of homicides committed by firearms in the state of California which have a Wikipedia article for the killing, the killer, or a related subject.

Article	Location	Date	Number killed	Number injured	Description
1928 Fairfield murders	Fairfield	1928-08-22	11	4	Workplace violence
1965 Highway 101 sniper attack	Orcutt (nearby)	1965-04-25	4 (including perpetrator)	10	Teenager shot at cars on highway
1973 South Los Angeles shootings	Los Angeles	1973-04-22	7	9	Spree shooting
1976 California State University, Fullerton massacre	Fullerton	1976-07-12	7	2	Workplace violence
Cleveland Elementary School shooting (San Diego)	San Diego	1979-01-29	2	9	School shooting
49th Street Elementary School shooting	Los Angeles	1984-02-24	3 (including perpetrator)	12	School shooting
San Ysidro McDonald's massacre	San Ysidro	1984-07-18	23 (including unborn child and perpetrator)	19	At the time, the massacre was the deadliest mass shooting by a lone gunman in U.S. history, being surpassed seven years later by the Luby's shooting.
Sunnyvale ESL shooting	Sunnyvale	1988-02-16	7	4	Stalking/workplace violence
Stockton schoolyard shooting	Stockton	1989-01-17	6 (including perpetrator)	32	School shooting
Ramon Salcido	Sonoma	1989-04-14	7		Domestic violence; familicide
Dana Ewell	Fresno	1992-04-19	3		Murder for hire for financial gain
1992 Lindhurst High School shooting	Olivehurst	1992-05-01	4	10	School shooting
1992 San Luis Obispo County shootings	Morro Bay/Paso Robles	1992-11-07	7 (including perpetrator)	2	Spree shooting
101 California Street shooting	San Francisco	1993-07-01	9	6	Attack on a law firm.
North Hollywood shootout	North Hollywood	1997-2-28	2 (both perpetrators)	20	Bank robbery and subsequent shootout
1999 Los Angeles Jewish Community Center shooting	Granada Hills and Chatsworth	1999-08-10	1	5	Anti-Semitic terrorist attack by Aryan Nations member
2001 Nevada County shootings	Nevada County	2001-01-10	3	3	Spree shooting
2001 Santana High School shooting	Santee	2001-03-05	2	13	School shooting
Marcus Wesson	Fresno	2004-03-12	9		Domestic violence; familicide
2006 Goleta postal facility shooting	Goleta	2006-01-30	8 (including perpetrator)		Workplace violence
Covina massacre	Covina	2008-12-24	10 (including perpetrator)		Domestic violence
2011 Seal Beach shooting	Seal Beach	2011-10-12	8	1	Domestic violence incident at hair salon
Southern California Edison shooting	Irwindale	2011-12-16	3 (including perpetrator)	2	Workplace shooting
2012 Oikos University shooting	Oakland	2012-04-02	7	2	School shooting
2012 Anaheim, California police shooting and protests	Anaheim	2012-07-21	2	6	Protests after police officer killings
2012 Fresno meat plant shooting	Fresno	2012-11-6	3 (including perpetrator)	2	Workplace violence
Christopher Dorner shootings and manhunt	Los Angeles (and nearby)	2013-02-3 to 2013-02-12	5 (including perpetrator)		Workplace violence against other law enforcement
2013 Santa Monica shootings	Santa Monica	2013-06-07	6 (including perpetrator)	2	School shooting
Salinas taqueria shooting	Salinas	2013-06-07	3	4	Gang-related fight and shooting
Isla Vista attacks	Isla Vista	2014-05-23	6	14	Misogynist terrorist attack by incel follower
Shootings of Sacramento County law enforcement officers	Sacramento	2014-10-24	2	2	Shooting of Sacramento County sheriff's deputies
2015 San Bernardino attack	San Bernardino	2015-12-02	16 (including both perpetrators)	24	Islamic terrorist attack at the workplace.
2017 Fresno shootings	Fresno	2017-04-18	4		Racially-motivated anti-white shooting
Rancho Tehama shootings	Rancho Tehama	2017-11-13 to 2017-11-14	6 (including perpetrator)	18	Domestic violence and car chase
Thousand Oaks shooting	Thousand Oaks	2018-11-07	13 (including perpetrator)	16	Mass shooting at a restaurant
Tulare County shootings	Tulare County	2018-12-16	3 (including perpetrator)	7	Spree shooting and car chase
2019 Poway synagogue shooting	Poway	2019-04-27	1	3	Antisemitic terrorist attack inspired by the Pittsburgh synagogue shooting and the Christchurch mosque shootings.
2019 Gilroy Garlic Festival shooting	Gilroy	2019-07-28	4 (including perpetrator)	12	Mass shooting at food festival
Orinda shooting	Orinda	2019-10-31	5	4	Mass shooting that occurred during a house party.
Saugus High School shooting	Santa Clarita	2019-11-14	2	5	School shooting
2019 Fresno shooting	Fresno	2019-11-17	4	6	A group of family and friends were gathered in a backyard Sunday to watch a football game when two gunmen sneaked into the yard and began shooting.
2020 boogaloo murders	Oakland	2020-05-30	2	3	Attacks on law enforcement during the George Floyd protests.
Aguanga shooting	Aguanga	2020-09-07	7		Unsolved case, investigated by police if related to a marijuana grower
2021 San Jose shooting	San Jose	2021-05-26	10 (including perpetrator)		Mass shooting; workplace violence
2022 Sacramento shooting	Sacramento	2022-04-03	6	12	Crips–Bloods gang war
2022 Laguna Woods shooting	Laguna Woods, California	2022-05-15	1	5	Suspected anti-Taiwanese shooting at a church.
2022 Oakland school shooting	Oakland	2022-09-28	1	5	Mass shooting, unsolved and alleged by police to be gang-related.
2022 Oakland party shooting	Oakland	2023-01-16	2	2	Two juveniles held.
2023 Goshen shooting	Goshen	2023-01-16	6	0	Unsolved alleged cartel massacre at a house.
2023 Monterey Park shooting	Monterey Park	2023-01-21	12 (including perpetrator)	9	Mass shooting during Lunar New Year celebrations
2023 Half Moon Bay shootings	Half Moon Bay	2023-01-23	7	1	Workplace violence at two farms.
2023 Trabuco Canyon shooting	Trabuco Canyon, California	2023-08-23	4 (including perpetrator)	6	Mass shooting at bar, gunman targeted his ex-wife
2025 Stockton shooting	Stockton, California	2025-11-29	4	13	Mass shooting at child's birthday party.
2026 Islamic Center of San Diego shooting	San Diego	2026-05-18	5 (including both perpetrators)	1	Mass shooting at the Islamic Center of San Diego, two perpetrators of the shooting later died due to self-inflicted gunshot wounds. Suspected to be a hate crime.

== See also ==
- List of homicides in California
