= List of massacres in the United States =

Massacres in the United States

This is a partial list of massacres in the United States; death tolls may be approximate.

- For single-perpetrator events and shooting sprees, view List of rampage killers in the United States, Mass shootings in the United States, Category:Spree shootings in the United States, and Category:Mass shootings in the United States by year.
- For Indian massacres, see Indian massacres.
- For massacres in labor disputes, see List of worker deaths in United States labor disputes.

== List ==
Name	Date	Location	State	Deaths, including any perpetrators	Notes
Boston Massacre	1770 Mar 5	Boston	Massachusetts	5	5 Bostonians killed and 6 wounded by soldiers of the 29th Regiment of Foot. The killed and wounded were part of a mob which was harassing the soldiers, and the soldiers opened fire after being stoned by the crowd.
Brodhead's Coshocton expedition	1778 Apr	Ohio Country	Ohio	16	16 Lenape warriors were captured, taken south of the village, and massacred by American soldiers under the command of Colonel Daniel Brodhead.
Baylor Massacre	1778 Sep 27	River Vale	New Jersey	16	A force of British soldiers under the command of Major-General Charles Grey carried a successful surprise attack against the 3rd Regiment of Continental Light Dragoons under the command of Colonel George Baylor while they slept.
Long Run massacre	1781 Sep 13–14	Floyds Fork	Kentucky	32	A Native American war party attacked a party of U.S. settlers, killing 15. They also attacked American soldiers under Colonel John Floyd who returned the next day to bury the dead, killing a further 17.
Gnadenhutten massacre	1782 Mar 8	Gnadenhutten	Ohio	96	Christian Lenape who were massacred by American militiamen during the Revolutionary War
Goliad massacre	1836 Mar 27	Goliad	Texas	425–445	Largest massacre to have taken place on what is today United States territory, occurring after the Battle of Refugio and the Battle of Coleto; 425–445 prisoners of war from the Texian Army of the Republic of Texas were executed by the Mexican Army in the town of Goliad, Mexican Texas, (not the Republic of Texas), which is today in Texas, United States.
Hawn's Mill massacre	1838 Oct 30	Fairview Township	Missouri	19	Mob/Missouri Volunteer Militia attacked Mormons.
Dawson massacre	1842 Sep 17	Presidio San Antonio de Béxar	Texas	66	36 of the Texan militia killed by Mexican soldiers during the Woll Expedition. 30 Mexican soldiers were also killed.
Philadelphia nativist riots	1844 May 6–8, Jul 6–7	Philadelphia	Pennsylvania	20+	20+ Catholics killed
Bloody Monday	1855 Aug 6	Louisville	Kentucky	>22	Scores injured in anti-Catholic religious mob violence and arson.
Pottawatomie massacre	1856 May 24–25	Franklin County	Kansas	5	John Brown and followers killed 5 pro-slavery settlers during the Bleeding Kansas period.
Spirit Lake Massacre	1857 Mar 5–12	West Okoboji	Iowa	35–40	A band of Dakota people led by Inkpaduta conducted a series of raids on white settlers.
Mountain Meadows Massacre	1857 Sep 7–11	Mountain Meadows	Utah Territory	120–140	Emigrant wagon train annihilated by the Mormon Utah Territorial Militia.
Marais des Cygnes massacre	1858 May 19	Linn County	Kansas	5	Last major outbreak of violence in Bleeding Kansas.
Pratt Street Massacre	1861 Apr 19	Baltimore	Maryland	16	Political riot between Copperheads, Confederate sympathizers, and Union militias.
Sacking of Osceola	1861 Sep 23	Osceola	Missouri	9	Tried by drumhead court martial and executed, town of 3,000 sacked and burned in a raid by Jim Lane's Kansas Brigade.
Nueces massacre	1862 Aug 10	Kinney County	Texas	34	German Texans killed by Confederate soldiers.
Shelton Laurel massacre	1863 Jan 18	Madison County	North Carolina	13	Unarmed Unionists, including three boys, were shot by Confederates after capture.
Bear River Massacre	1863 Jan 29	Franklin County	Idaho	350+	Military attack on a North Shoshone encampment described as the largest single episode of genocide in the western United States
Lawrence massacre	1863 Aug 21	Douglas County	Kansas	185–200	Pro-Confederate Guerrillas killed civilians and burned a quarter of the town.
Baxter Springs Massacre	1863 Oct 6	Cherokee County	Kansas	115	Convoy of Union soldiers led by James B. Pond who were ambushed by Confederate raiders under the command of William C. Quantrill. Many of the convoy were massacred as they tried to surrender.
Fort Pillow massacre	1864 Apr 12	Henning	Tennessee	277–297	Black Union troops were killed by Forrest's Cavalry Corps while trying to surrender.
Centralia massacre	1864 Sep 27	Centralia	Missouri	24	Unarmed U.S. soldiers murdered by their Confederate captors including Jesse James. 123 killed in ensuing Battle of Centralia.
Saltville massacre	1864 Oct 2–3	Saltville	Virginia	45–50	Wounded/captured Federal black troops by Confederate soldiers and guerrillas.
Sand Creek massacre	1864 Nov 29	Kiowa County	Colorado	100–600	massacre of Cheyenne and Arapaho people by the U.S. Army.
Memphis massacre	1866 May 1–3	Memphis	Tennessee	48	Massacre of the black community of Memphis by white mobs and police officers.
New Orleans massacre	1866 Jul 30	New Orleans	Louisiana	38-204	Peaceful demonstration of mostly black Freedmen attack by white rioters, many of whom were former soldiers of the recently defeated Confederate States of America.
Camilla massacre	1868 Sep 23	Camilla	Georgia	9–15	Attack by the Ku Klux Klan on a gathering of Black republicans.
Opelousas Massacre	1868 Sep 28	Opelousas	Louisiana	35+	African Americans from Opelousas attempted to join the local Democratic party which was controlled by whites. The African Americans were rejected for membership and the white Democrats then subsequently went on a hunt for African Americans. In the end an estimated 200–300 African Americans were killed.
Marias Massacre	1870 Jan 23	Marias River, Montana Territory	Montana	173–217	Friendly band of Piegan Blackfeet killed against orders by Eugene Mortimer Baker in retaliation for the Murder of Malcolm Clarke by a member of a different Band of Piegan Blackfeet
Chinese massacre	1871 Oct 24	Los Angeles, California	California	>18	Killed by hanging and unknown injured in mob violence against people and property in Chinatown.
Goingsnake massacre	1872 Apr 15	Tahlequah	Indian Territory (present-day Oklahoma)	11	Died in a shoot out in a crowded courtroom, the dead included 8 Deputy US Marshals and 3 Cherokee citizens. Six Cherokee were wounded including the defendant and the judge.
Colfax massacre	1873 Apr 13	Colfax	Louisiana	83–153	Black people killed at courthouse and as prisoners afterwards.
Coushatta massacre	1874 Aug	Coushatta	Louisiana	11–26	Six whites, remainder black killed as political intimidation.
Election riot of 1874	1874 Nov 3	Eufaula	Alabama	8	70 injured. White League Democrats drove African American Republicans from the polls.
Hamburg massacre	1876 Jul 4	Hamburg	South Carolina	7	Town looted in a racially motivated incident during Reconstruction.
Ellenton massacre	1876 Sep 15–16	Aiken County	South Carolina	25–100	Racially motivated killings after the alleged attack on a white woman.
Chico Chinese Massacre	1877 Mar 14	Chico	California	4	A group of armed white men from a labor union fired upon Chinese workers, killing four and wounding at least two others. The next day, the town's Chinatown was burned.
Guadalupe Canyon massacre	1881 Aug 13	Guadalupe Mountains	Arizona Territory	5	1 wounded; cowboys ambushed while sleeping. Perpetrators disputed.
Rock Springs massacre	1885 Sep 2	Rock Springs	Wyoming	28	15 injured in a racial dispute between white and Chinese miners.
Haymarket affair	1886 May 4	Chicago	Illinois	11	More than 130 injured by dynamite bomb and crossfire of bullets during a FOTLU rally for an eight-hour work day.
Bay View massacre	1886 May 5	Bay View	Wisconsin	7	Knights of Labor protesters killed by National Guardsmen.
Chinese Massacre Cove	1887 May	Wallowa County	Oregon	10–34	Chinese gold miners ambushed and murdered by a gang of horse thieves.
Thibodaux massacre	1887 Nov 22	Thibodaux	Louisiana	>35	Perhaps as many as 300 killed, 5+ injuries to striking black sugar-cane workers.
1891 New Orleans lynchings	1891, Mar 14	New Orleans	Louisiana	11	A lynch mob storms the Old Parish Prison and lynches 11 Italians who had been found not guilty of the murder of Police Chief David Hennessy.
Lattimer massacre	1897 Sep 10	Lattimer	Pennsylvania	19	Coal miners killed by sheriff's posse.
Wilmington massacre	1898 Nov 10	Wilmington	North Carolina	60–300	A mob of 2000 white men armed from the looted Wilmington armory, led by white supremacist and Democratic politician Alfred Moore Waddell burnt down The Daily Record newspaper building, destroyed numerous black-owned properties, and murdered somewhere between 60 and 300 Black residents of Wilmington.

== 20th century ==
The 1906 Atlanta Race Massacre	1906 Sep 22 -24	Atlanta	Georgia	27+	Racially motivated massacre against African Americans.
1908 Hickman massacre	1908 Oct 3	Hickman	Kentucky	4-8	A mob of around 50 men who called themselves "Night Riders" shot 8 members of the Walker family, four of which are confirmed to have died.
Slocum massacre	1910 Jul 29–30	Slocum	Texas	22+	The death toll reported by major newspapers ranged between 8 and 22; however, evidence suggests as many as two hundred African Americans were killed.
Villisca massacre	1912 Jun 10	Villisca	Iowa	8	Unsolved axe murders of members of 2 families.
Ludlow Massacre	1914 Apr 20	Ludlow	Colorado	19	Killed by Colorado National Guard and Colorado Fuel & Iron Company camp guards on a tent colony of 1,200 striking coal miners and their families.
Newberry massacre	1916 Aug 18	Newberry	Florida	6	A white mob shot and killed a black man and then hung two black men, one of which was a minister, and two black women, one of which was pregnant at the time.
Everett massacre	1916 Nov 5	Everett	Washington	5	27 injured and scores of IWW unionists arrested by police and vigilantes.
East St. Louis massacre	1917 May 28, Jul 1–3	East St. Louis	Illinois	48-159	Racially motivated massacre against African Americans.
Marrazzo massacre	1918 Oct 21	Chicago	Illinois	5	Peter Marrazzo killed his wife and 4 children during the height of the Spanish flu pandemic. He was committed to a mental hospital but released after only 2 years.
Elaine massacre	1919 Sep 30	Phillips County	Arkansas	100–241	Racially motivated massacre against African Americans.
Centralia massacre	1919 Nov 11	Centralia	Washington	6	Four American Legionnaires killed by Industrial Workers of the World members in proximity to the storming of the IWW union hall. Also killed were IWW organizer Wesley Everest and, four days later, a deputy sheriff.
Matewan massacre	1920 May 19	Matewan	West Virginia	11	The confrontation resulted in the deaths of Matewan Mayor Cabell Testerman, two striking coal miners, seven men from the Baldwin-Felts Detective Agency, and an unarmed bystander.
Ocoee massacre	1920 Nov 2	Ocoee	Florida	56~	Black population of Ocoee, a town near Orlando, was nearly obliterated during the 1920 election season.
Tulsa race massacre	1921 May 31, Jun 1	Tulsa	Oklahoma	39–300	≥ 800 wounded. One of the nation's worst incidents of racial violence.
Battle of Blair Mountain	1921 Aug 25	Logan County	West Virginia	10–33	Private army and US Troops against union organizers. WWI gas bombs used against union organizers.
Herrin massacre	1922 Jun 21	Herrin	Illinois	23	Exchange of gunfire between strikebreakers and union guards at coal mine.
Rosewood massacre	1923 Jan	Rosewood	Florida	8	The entire population of African-Americans in and near Rosewood, about 350, were forced from their homes and never returned.
Hanapepe massacre	1924 Sep 9	Hanapepe	Hawaii	20	101 arrested.
Bath School disaster	1927 May 18	Bath Township	Michigan	45	School Bombing
Columbine Mine massacre	1927 Nov 21	Serene	Colorado	6	Miners killed with machine guns by the Colorado Rangers and the Rocky Mountain Fuel Company during a United Mine Workers coal mine strike.
Saint Valentine's Day Massacre	1929 Feb 14	Chicago	Illinois	7	Prohibition gang killing in Lincoln Park by Al Capone's Chicago Outfit.
Young Brothers massacre	1932 Jan 2	Brookline	Missouri	6	The worst killing of police officers domestically in the United States.
Kansas City massacre	1933 Jun 17	Kansas City	Missouri	5	The dead include law enforcement officers and a criminal fugitive shot by members of a gang.
1937 Memorial Day massacre	1937 May 30	Chicago	Illinois	10	The Chicago Police Department shot and killed ten unarmed demonstrators in Chicago during the Little Steel strike.
Utah prisoner of war massacre	1945 Jul 7–8	Salina, Utah	Utah	9	German POWs killed by an American guard
Camden shootings	1949 Sep 6	Camden	New Jersey	13	Included three children in a 12-minute walk through his neighbourhood.
Bombing of United Air Lines Flight 629	1955 Nov 5	Longmont	Colorado	44	Jack Gilbert Graham bombs Flight 629 that his mother is on in an attempt to collect on her life insurance money. It is the worst act of mass murder in Colorado's history.
Bombing of National Airlines Flight 2511	1960 Jan 6	Wilmington	North Carolina	34 including the bomber	Julian Frank bombs Flight 2511, killing himself and the 33 passengers. It is one of the deadliest acts of mass murder in North Carolina.
16th Street Baptist Church bombing	1963 Sep 15	Birmingham	Alabama	4	Members of the Ku Klux Klan and segregationists plant bombs inside the African-American 16th Street Baptist Church in Birmingham, killing four young African American girls and injuring 14-22 more.
Crash of Pacific Air Lines Flight 773	1964 May 7	San Ramon	California	44 including the hijacker	Francisco Paulo Gonzales shot and killed the pilots before killing himself, causing the plane to crash. It is the deadliest act of mass murder in California's history.
1966 student nurse massacre	1966 Jul 13	Chicago	Illinois	8	Richard Speck murdered eight student nurses in their Chicago residence.
University of Texas tower Shooting	1966 Aug 1	Austin	Texas	18 including the shooter	31 others wounded.
Lane hotel fire	1966 Sep 12	Anchorage	Alaska	14	Charles Thessan sets fire to the Lane Hotel killing 14. It is the worst mass murder in Alaska’s history.
Orangeburg Massacre	1968 Feb 8	Orangeburg	South Carolina	3	Nine highway patrolmen and one city police officer opened fire on a crowd of African American students.
Kent State shootings	1970 May 4	Kent	Ohio	4	Ohio National Guard opened fire on unarmed student protesters at Kent State University.
Gulliver's nightclub fire	1974 June 30	Port Chester Greenwich	New York Connecticut	24	A man wanted to cover up a robbery, sets fire to Gulliver's nightclub.
Easter Sunday Massacre	1975 Mar 30	Hamilton	Ohio	11	All victims were family members of the killer shot and killed by pistols at a family gathering.
Golden Dragon massacre	1977 Sep 4	San Francisco	California	5	11 injured. Hong Kong American street gang the Joe Boys committed violent shooting
Greensboro massacre	1979 Nov 3	Greensboro	North Carolina	5	Violent clash between Ku Klux Klan and Communist Workers' Party demonstration.
1982 Wilkes-Barre shootings	1982 Sep 25	Wilkes-Barre and Jenkins Township	Pennsylvania	13	1 wounded
Wah Mee massacre	1983 Feb 18	Seattle	Washington	13	1 injured by 3 perpetrators during an armed robbery.
Malibu Grand Prix murders	1983 July 1	Houston	Texas	4	Four employees are violently stabbed to death in one of Texas’s most gruesome mass murders.
Palm Sunday massacre	1984 Apr 15	Brooklyn	New York	10	Three women, a teenage girl, and six children. There was one survivor, an infant girl.
San Ysidro McDonald's massacre	1984 Jul 18	San Ysidro	California	23 including the gunman and an unborn baby	19 others wounded
1985 MOVE bombing	1985 May 13	Philadelphia	Pennsylvania	11	Philadelphia, Mayor Wilson Goode orders police to storm the radical black American resistance group MOVE's headquarters to end a stand-off. The police drop an explosive device into the headquarters, killing eleven members of MOVE and destroying the homes of 61 city residents in the resulting fire
Edmond post office shooting	1986 Aug 20	Edmond	Oklahoma	15 including the gunman	6 wounded. This incident is the origin of the phrase 'going postal'.
Crash of Pacific Southwest Airlines Flight 1771	1987 Dec 7	San Luis Obispo (In the air)	California	43 including the hijacker	No survivors. A disgruntled employee takes revenge and intentionally crashes the Airplane. It is the second worst act of mass murder in California's history.
4 O'Clock murders	1988 Jun 6	Houston and Irving	Texas	4	Murder by shooting of four people at the same time on June 6, 1988, at three locations in Texas led by Mormon fundamentalist leader Heber LeBaron of the Church of the Firstborn.
Las Cruces bowling alley massacre	1990 Feb 10	Las Cruces	New Mexico	5	Robbers, who remain unidentified, shot seven people, including one employee's 2-year-old daughter, in the bowling alley's office after taking $4–5,000 from the safe. Four died that day; another succumbed to complications of her injuries in 1999.
Happy Land Fire	March 25, 1990	Bronk, New York City	New York	87	Wanting to exact revenge on his ex-girlfriend he pours gasoline on the Happy Land Social Club and sets fire to the structure. It becomes one of the worst acts of mass murder in American History as 87 people died in the fire.
GMAC shootings	1990 Jun 18	Jacksonville	Florida	10 including the gunman	The attacker began killing the day before killing 2 others. He wounded a total of 6 people over the 2 days.
Father's Day bank massacre	1991 June 16	Denver	Colorado	4 bank guards	Unsolved Mass Murder.
Luby's shooting	1991 Oct 16	Killeen	Texas	24 including the gunman	27 others were wounded although only 19 of those were from gunfire.
Brown's Chicken massacre	1993 Jan 8	Palatine	Illinois	7	Store robbery with murder.
Waco siege	1993 Feb 28 – Apr 19	Waco	Texas	86	4 ATF agents and 6 Branch Davidians killed in a shoot out February 28; on April 19 a final assault on the compound by the FBI occurred. A fire destroyed the compound resulting in the deaths of 76 Branch Davidians, including 25 children. The fire started following law enforcement deployment of flammable CS gas. A panel of arson investigators concluded that the Davidians were responsible for igniting the fire simultaneously in at least three different areas of the compound.
Long Island Rail Road shooting	1993 Dec 7	Garden City	New York	6	19 Injured. Racially motivated against Caucasians.
Oklahoma City bombing	1995 Apr 19	Oklahoma City	Oklahoma	168	680 others injured, and destroyed more than one-third of the building, which had to be demolished.
Freddy's Fashion Mart attack	1995 Dec 8	Harlem	New York	8 including the gunman	
Bandon massacre	1996 May 9	Bandon	Oregon	5	Girley Crum Jr. murders five members of the Jacobs family by cutting their throats. It is considered one of the worst crimes and mass murders In Oregon’s history.
Westside Middle School shooting	1998 Mar 24	Jonesboro	Arkansas	5	10 others injured. 13-year-old Mitchell Johnson and 11-year-old Andrew Golden opened fire on the school with multiple weapons, and both were arrested when they attempted to flee the scene. Of the 15 victims, 14 were female.
Murder of the Hang children	1998 Sept 3	Saint Paul	Minnesota	6	Khoua Her strangles her six children to death in one of the worst cases of filicide in American history.
Columbine High School massacre	1999 Apr 20	Columbine	Colorado	16 including both gunmen	23 others were wounded, 20 of those by gunfire.
1999 Atlanta day trading firm shootings	1999 Jul 29	Atlanta	Georgia	10 including the gunman	He also killed his wife on the 27th, his 2 children on the 28th then the main attack occurred on the 29th where he killed 9 victims and wounded 13 others.
Xerox murders	1999 Nov 2	Honolulu	Hawaii	7 coworkers	Byran Koji Uyesugi shoots and kills 7 of his coworkers in Hawaii's worst mass murder.
Wendy's massacre	2000 May 24	Queens	New York	5 Employees	Committed by a former employee and his accomplice who planned to rob the location. Killed 5 employees and critically injured 2. The deadliest mass shooting in New York City.
Wichita Massacre	2000 Dec 8–14	Wichita	Kansas	5	Two brothers Reginald and Jonathan Carr, committed multiple acts of assault, robbery, rape and murder of several people, all white, over the course of a week.

== 21st century ==
Isla Vista car massacre	2001 Feb 23	Isla Vista	California	5	Horrific vehicle ramming attack perpetrated by David Attias.
Campus Walk Apartment fire	2002 Feb 14–15	Greensboro	North Carolina	4 and six injured.	To get back at her Ex-Boyfriend, Janet Danahey sets fire to his apartment building housing 36, resulting in 4 students burning to death as well as injuring 6 people trying to escape the flames.
Wesson family massacre	2004 March 12	Fresno	California	9	Marcus Wesson murders 9 of his children to hide his incestuous affair he had with his daughters and nieces. It is the worst mass murder in Fresno history.
Deltona massacre	2004 Aug 6	Volusia County	Florida	6	Wanting Revenge for being kicked out of a home, Troy Victorino broke back in along with 3 accomplices, and bludgeoned 6 people and a dog to death, including the person who evicted him.
Glendale train crash	2005 Jan 26	Glendale/Los Angeles	California	11	Juan Manuel Álvarez intentionally left his car on the train tracks to commit suicide but bailed out on the last minute causing it to crash killing 11 and injuring 117.
Red Lake shootings	2005 Mar 21	Red Lake	Minnesota	10 including the gunman	2 shot and killed at the home of the shooter's grandfather. 7 killed and 7 wounded at Red Lake Senior High School.
Capitol Hill massacre	2006 March 25	Seattle	Washington (state)	6	Kyle Huff goes to a block party and kills six of the attendees before committing suicide. Worst mass murder in Seattle since the Wah-Mee massacre.
West Nickel Mines School shooting	2006 Oct 2	Bart Township	Pennsylvania	7 including the gunman	6 killed, 4 injured, perpetrator died by suicide
Mizpah Hotel fire	2006 Oct 31	Tonopah	Nevada	12 killed and 32 injured	A woman sets fire to a mattress in the historic Mizpah Hotel, after an argument, and kills 12 people.
Virginia Tech shooting	2007 Apr 16	Blacksburg	Virginia	33 including the gunman	23 Wounded, 17 by gunfire.
Westroads Mall shooting	2007 Dec 5	Omaha	Nebraska	9	6 injured; perpetrator committed suicide with the murder weapon after 6 minutes of shooting.
Lane Bryant shooting	2008 Feb 2	Tinley Park	Illinois	5	5 killed, 1 injured
Iowa City Sueppel murders	2008 March 23	Iowa City	Iowa	5	Steven Sueppel bludgeons his family before committing suicide to avoid going to jail for Embezzlement charges.
Covina massacre	2008 Dec 24	Covina	California	9	Bruce Pardo kills his former in-laws and his ex-wife in a shooting and arson attack.
Geneva County massacre	2009 Mar 10	Geneva and Samson	Alabama	11 including the gunman	6 wounded.
Binghamton shooting	2009 Apr 3	Binghamton	New York	14 including the gunman	4 wounded.
Fort Hood massacre	2009 Nov 5	Fort Hood	Texas	14 including an unborn baby	30+ wounded by Nidal Hasan, it was the deadliest mass shooting on an American military base.
Aurora shooting	2012 Jul 20	Aurora	Colorado	13 including an unborn baby	70 people were wounded, 58 from gunfire, 4 from tear gas, and 8 from injuries sustained fleeing from shooting during a screening of The Dark Knight Rises.
Sandy Hook Elementary School shooting	2012 Dec 14	Newtown	Connecticut	28 including the gunman	27 at the school (including the gunman) and the attacker's mother at her home. 20 of the dead were children aged 6–7 years old. 2 faculty members were wounded.
Washington Navy Yard shooting	2013 Sep 16	Washington Navy Yard	Washington D.C.	13 including the gunman	8 wounded, 3 from gunfire.
Isla Vista attacks	2014 May 23	Isla Vista	California	7 including the gunman	14 wounded. Misogynist terrorism, revenge for sexual and social rejection, incel ideology
Charleston church shooting	2015 Jun 17	Charleston	South Carolina	9	1 wounded. White supremacist shooting at African Methodist Episcopal Bible study
Bever family massacre	2015 Jul 22	Broken Arrow, Oklahoma	Oklahoma	5	1 wounded. Two brothers kill their family in preparation for a Mass shooting plot which they hoped would acquire them notoriety and infamy
Umpqua Community College shooting	2015 Oct 1	Roseburg	Oregon	10 including the gunman	8 wounded. Gunman asked victims for their religion before shooting them.
San Bernardino attack	2015 Dec 2	San Bernardino	California	16 including both gunmen	24 wounded. Attackers brought pipe bombs as well as firearms, they targeted a San Bernardino County Department of Public Health training event and Christmas party.
Gage Park murders	2016 Feb 2	Chicago	Illinois	6	Six members of Martinez family murdered in their home in Gage Park, Chicago by their relative Diego Umbre and his girlfriend Jafeth Ramos.
Pulse nightclub massacre	2016 Jun 12	Orlando	Florida	50 including the gunman	53 wounded. Shooter pledged allegiance to ISIS. It is one of the worst mass murders in American history.
2016 shooting of Dallas police officers	2016 July 7	Dallas	Texas	5	Black nationalist, Micah Xavier Johnson, murders 5 law enforcement officers during a protest making it the second deadliest attack domestically against police officers.
Las Vegas shooting	2017 Oct 1	Las Vegas	Nevada	61 including the gunman	867 wounded, 411 from gunfire. Deadliest mass shooting in US history.
Sutherland Springs church shooting	2017 Nov 5	Sutherland Springs	Texas	27 including the gunman and an unborn baby	20 wounded and 26 dead, including and unborn baby
Stoneman Douglas High School shooting	2018 Feb 14	Parkland	Florida	17	17 killed; 17 wounded.
Pike County massacre	2018 April 21–22	Pike County	Ohio	8	8 members of the Rhoden family gunned down in their home by the opposing Wagner family.
2018 Santa Fe High School shooting	2018 May 18	Santa Fe	Texas	10	14 wounded, including the suspect.
Watts family murders	2018 Aug 13	Frederick	Colorado	4 (including an unborn baby)	Chris Watts suffocates his family to death, terminating his unborn son in the process.
Pittsburgh synagogue shooting	2018 Oct 27	Pittsburgh	Pennsylvania	11	7 wounded, including the suspect. Anti-Semitic shooting at a synagogue.
Thousand Oaks Shooting	2018 Nov 7	Thousand Oaks	California	13 including the gunman	Thirteen killed (including the gunman and a responding police officer) when a US Marine Corps veteran entered the Borderline Bar & Grill during College Country Night and began indiscriminately shooting.
2019 El Paso Walmart shooting	2019 Aug 3	El Paso	Texas	23	Patrick Crusius of Allen, an armed gunman inspired by the Christchurch mosque shootings and beliefs in the Great Replacement conspiracy theory and a supposed "Hispanic invasion of Texas", attacked a Walmart store, killing 23 people and injuring 23 others.
2019 Dayton Shooting	2019 Aug 4	Dayton	Ohio	9	Occurred 13 hours after the El Paso Walmart shooting, when Connor Betts, opened fire on Dayton's Historic District killing 9 people and injuring 27. It along with the El Paso Shooting, killed more than 30 people.
2019 Jersey City Shooting	2019 Dec 10	Jersey City	New Jersey	7 including both perpetrators and a victim killed on December 7.	Two Black supremacists shoot up a Kosher store to attack Jewish people.
2020 Williamsburg massacre	2020 Dec 8	Williamsburg	West Virginia	5 including the gunwoman	Family Annihilation committed by Oreanna Myers when she shot and killed her 3 biological children and her 2 stepchildren before settling fire to the house and committing suicide. Described as the worst mass shooting in West Virginia's history.
2021 Chicago-Evanston shootings	2021 Jan 9	Chicago and Evanston	Illinois	6 including the gunman	Random shooting spree in Chicago and Evanston, Illinois before the perpetrator was killed by police.
Santa Clara VTA Rail Yard Shooting	2021 May 26	San Jose	California	10 including the gunman	Targeted shooting of co-workers of the shooter at Santa Clara Valley Transportation Authority.
Waukesha Christmas parade attack	2021 Nov 21	Waukesha	Wisconsin	6 killed and 62 injured.	A vehicle ramming attack at a Christmas parade in Wisconsin. One of the deadliest vehicle ramming attacks in American history.
2022 Buffalo shooting	2022 May 14	Buffalo	New York	10	Mass shooting against African-American shoppers at a Tops Friendly Markets. Suspect said motive was to prevent others from 'eliminating the white race'
Robb Elementary School shooting	2022 May 24	Uvalde	Texas	22 including the gunman	One of the deadliest school shootings in American history, leaving 19 children and 2 adults dead. The perpetrator was killed in a shootout with police.
Idaho student murders	2022 Nov 13	Moscow	Idaho	4	Bryan Kohberger murders four students in a horrific stabbing attack.
2023 Goshen shooting	2023 Jan 16	Goshen	California	6	Gang violence. Three others survived the shooting uninjured
2023 Lewiston shootings	2023 Oct 25	Lewiston	Maine	19 including the gunman	Gunman kills 18 people in a spree shooting throughout Lewiston, Maine before dying by suicide. It is the deadliest shooting in Maine.
Mānoa murders	2024 March 10	Mānoa	Hawaii	5 including the stabber	Paris Oda stabbed his family to death in one of Hawaii's worst mass murders.
2025 New Orleans truck attack	2025 Jan 1	New Orleans	Louisiana	14 including the driver	An Islamic extremist plowed a truck through a crowd killing 14 and injuring 57 others, before being killed by police.

== See also ==
- List of ethnic riots § United States
- List of incidents of civil unrest in the United States
- List of rampage killers (school massacres)
- List of school massacres by death toll
- Mass racial violence in the United States
- Murder of workers in labor disputes in the United States
- Mass shootings in the United States
- List of mass stabbings in the United States
- Freedmen massacres
