= 2023 Monterey Park shooting =

Mass shooting in California, U.S.

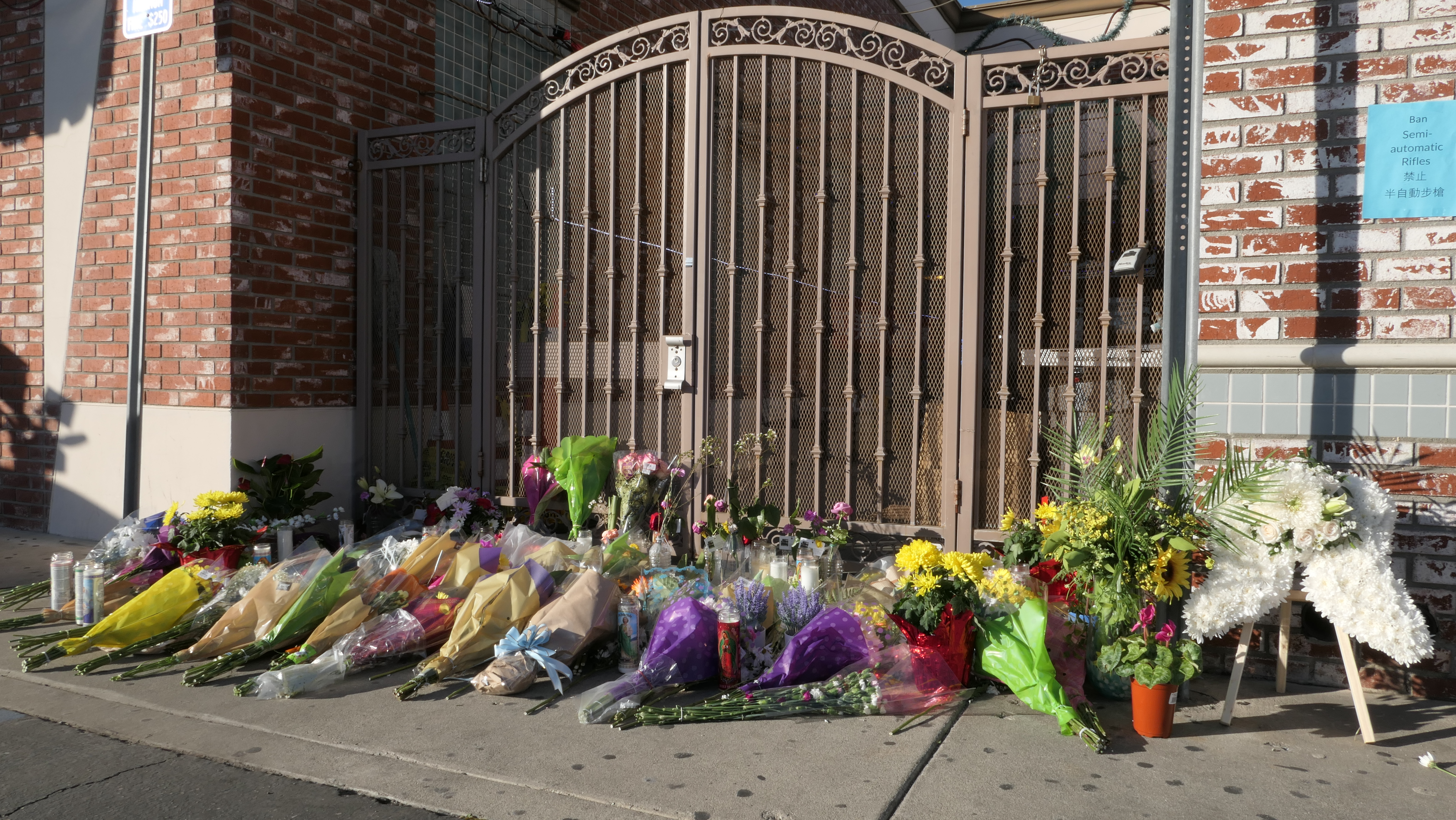
- Makeshift memorial outside Star Ballroom Dance Studio on January 23, 2023
- Map of perpetrator encounters in Los Angeles County
- Location: Monterey Park, California, U.S.
- Date: January 21, 2023; 3 years ago c. 10:22 p.m. (PST, UTC-8)
- Target: People at Star Ballroom Dance Studio and Lai Lai Ballroom
- Attack type: Mass shooting; mass murder; shooting spree; murder–suicide
- Weapons: Cobray M-11/9 semi-automatic pistol equipped with a homemade suppressor; Norinco Type 54 7.62x25mm semi-automatic pistol (Perpetrator's suicide)
- Deaths: 12 (including the perpetrator)
- Injuries: 9
- Perpetrator: Huu Can Tran
- Defender: Brandon Tsay
- Motive: Unknown

On January 21, 2023, a mass shooting occurred in Monterey Park, California, United States. The gunman killed eleven people and injured nine others. The shooting happened at about 10:22 p.m. PST (UTC-8) at Star Ballroom Dance Studio, after an all-day Lunar New Year Festival was held on a nearby street. Shortly afterwards, the gunman drove north to Lai Lai Ballroom in nearby Alhambra to continue his shooting spree but was confronted by then 26-year-old Brandon Tsay and disarmed before fleeing by car. The perpetrator was identified as 72-year-old Huu Can Tran. He died from a self-inflicted gunshot wound during a standoff with police in Torrance the next day. It is the deadliest mass shooting in the history of Los Angeles County.

== Background ==
Monterey Park is in the San Gabriel Valley of Los Angeles County and lies about seven miles (11 km) east of downtown Los Angeles. About 65% of the residents are of Asian descent; in the 1990 census, it became the first city in the mainland United States with a majority of residents of Asian descent. Tens of thousands of people had gathered nearby on January 21, Lunar New Year's Eve, for the start of the two-day festival, one of the largest Lunar New Year's celebrations in Southern California. The festival was scheduled to end at 9:00 p.m. that day and continue the next day. The event for Sunday was canceled.

The Star Ballroom Dance Studio is a Chinese-owned dance studio in the 100 block of West Garvey Avenue, near the intersection of Garfield Avenue. It was holding a Lunar New Year countdown dance party from 8:00 p.m. to 12:30 a.m., which was not part of the festival. The Star Ballroom's dance parties and the studio generally, are popular with older Asian Americans.

== Events ==
=== Monterey Park shooting ===
Gunfire was reported at the Star Ballroom at 10:22 p.m. on January 21, 2023. The gunman fled the scene. Monterey Park police responded within three minutes of the first 9-1-1 call, finding "individuals pouring out of the location screaming" when they arrived. Ten people were pronounced dead at the scene. Ten others were taken to local hospitals. The gunman used a Cobray M-11/9, a semi-automatic pistol variant of the MAC-11 with an extended high-capacity magazine. The gun and the high-capacity magazine are illegal in California. According to the county sheriff Robert Luna, the weapon was purchased in Monterey Park in 1999 but not registered. He also described the gunman as a male Asian wearing a black leather jacket, a black-and-white beanie, and glasses.

Tran fired 42 rounds in the dance hall. An unnamed witness to the shooting told the media that the gunman began "shooting everybody" in the ballroom and shooting some victims again while walking around. The studio's owner and manager, Ming Wei Ma reportedly was the first to rush the shooter, but was killed. One dancer, Yu Lan Kao, was killed shielding others from gunfire. Others may have done so as well.

The police took about five hours to alert the general public that the shooter was at large, although information was sent to police scanners and other government agencies. Scott Wiese, the city's new police chief (who started work two days before the shooting), said he did not wish to awaken the residents, who are predominantly Asian American, just because the police were "looking for a male Asian in Monterey Park". He also said that the police did not want to risk sharing the wrong information because they had about 40 witnesses, many of whom did not speak English.

=== Alhambra incident ===
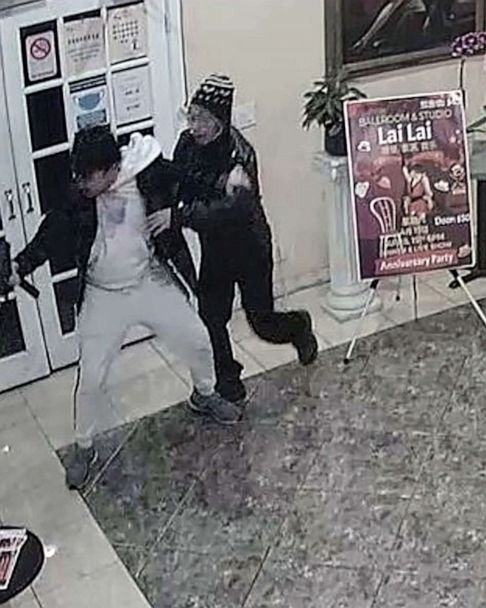
Tsay disarming Tran in the Lai Lai Ballroom and Studio

A second incident occurred three miles (4.8 km) away in Alhambra, approximately 17 minutes after the Monterey Park shooting. The gunman entered the Lai Lai Ballroom and Studio on South Garfield Avenue. Brandon Tsay, a 26-year-old computer programmer whose family owns the Lai Lai ballroom, confronted the gunman in the lobby, wrestled the gun away, and chased him out. His actions were lauded as heroic. Police credited Tsay with preventing more shootings and a larger death toll.

The gunman fled in a white 1999 Chevrolet Express 1500 cargo van. He was later identified as the Monterey Park gunman. The suspect was identified by the weapon seized at the Alhambra scene, which gave authorities his name and description.

=== Gunman's suicide ===
Around 10:20 a.m. on January 22, 2023, nearly 22 miles (35 km) away from the second attempted shooting site in Alhambra, police pulled over a van matching the description of the one seen leaving the Alhambra scene at a parking lot in Torrance. The stop was made near the intersections of Sepulveda and Hawthorne boulevards. The van's license plates appeared to be stolen. The plate belonged to the 1999 Chevrolet Express that he stole and Tran was driving a 2007 Chevrolet Express before the shootings. As officers approached the van, they heard a single gunshot coming from inside, retreated, and requested tactical units to respond. During the standoff SWAT officers, both visually from their armored vehicles and via a drone-mounted camera, observed the man in the driver's seat slumped over the steering wheel of the van. He died by a self-inflicted gunshot wound to the head from a Norinco 7.62×25 mm handgun.

He was identified as the gunman responsible for both the Monterey Park shooting and the Alhambra incident.

== Victims ==
Ten people, five men and five women, died at the scene – Valentino Marcos Alvero, 68; Hongying Jian (Note: Hongying Jian: traditional Chinese: 簡紅英; simplified Chinese: 简红英; pinyin: Jiǎn Hóngyīng), 62; Yu Lun Kao (Note: Yu Lun Kao: traditional Chinese: 高宇倫; simplified Chinese: 高宇伦; pinyin: Gāo Yǔlún), 72; Lilan Li (Note: Lilan Li: traditional Chinese: 李麗蘭; simplified Chinese: 李丽兰; pinyin: Lǐ Lìlán), 63; Ming Wei Ma (Note: Ming Wei Ma: traditional Chinese: 馬名偉; simplified Chinese: 马名伟; pinyin: Mǎ Míngwěi), 72; Mymy Nhan (Note: Mymy Nhan: Vietnamese: Nhan Mỹ Mỹ traditional Chinese: 顏美美; simplified Chinese: 颜美美; pinyin: Yán Měiměi), 65; Muoi Dai Ung, (Note: Muoi Dai Ung: Vietnamese: Ứng Mười Đài traditional Chinese: 應梅黛; simplified Chinese: 应梅黛; pinyin: Yīng Méidài) 67; Chia Ling Yau (Note: Chia Ling Yau: Chinese: 姚佳林; pinyin: Yáo Jiālín), 76; Wen-Tau Yu (Note: Wen Tau Yu: traditional Chinese: 于文濤; simplified Chinese: 于文涛; pinyin: Yú Wéntāo), 64; and Xiujuan Yu (Note: Xiujuan Yu: Chinese: 余秀娟; pinyin: Yú Xiùjuān), 57; Ming Wei Ma was Star Ballroom's owner and manager. Three of the victims were citizens of Taiwan, two were Chinese nationals, one a Vietnamese national, while four were American citizens, one with a Chinese-Vietnamese background, one Filipino-American, and two of Chinese descent. An eleventh victim, Diana Man Ling Tom (Note: Diana Man Ling Tom: traditional Chinese: 張曼玲; simplified Chinese: 张曼玲; pinyin: Zhāng Mànlíng), 70, died at the LAC+USC Medical Center the day after the attack; she was from Hong Kong. Nine more people were injured in the shooting; seven of them remained hospitalized as of January 22, some in critical condition.

== Defender ==
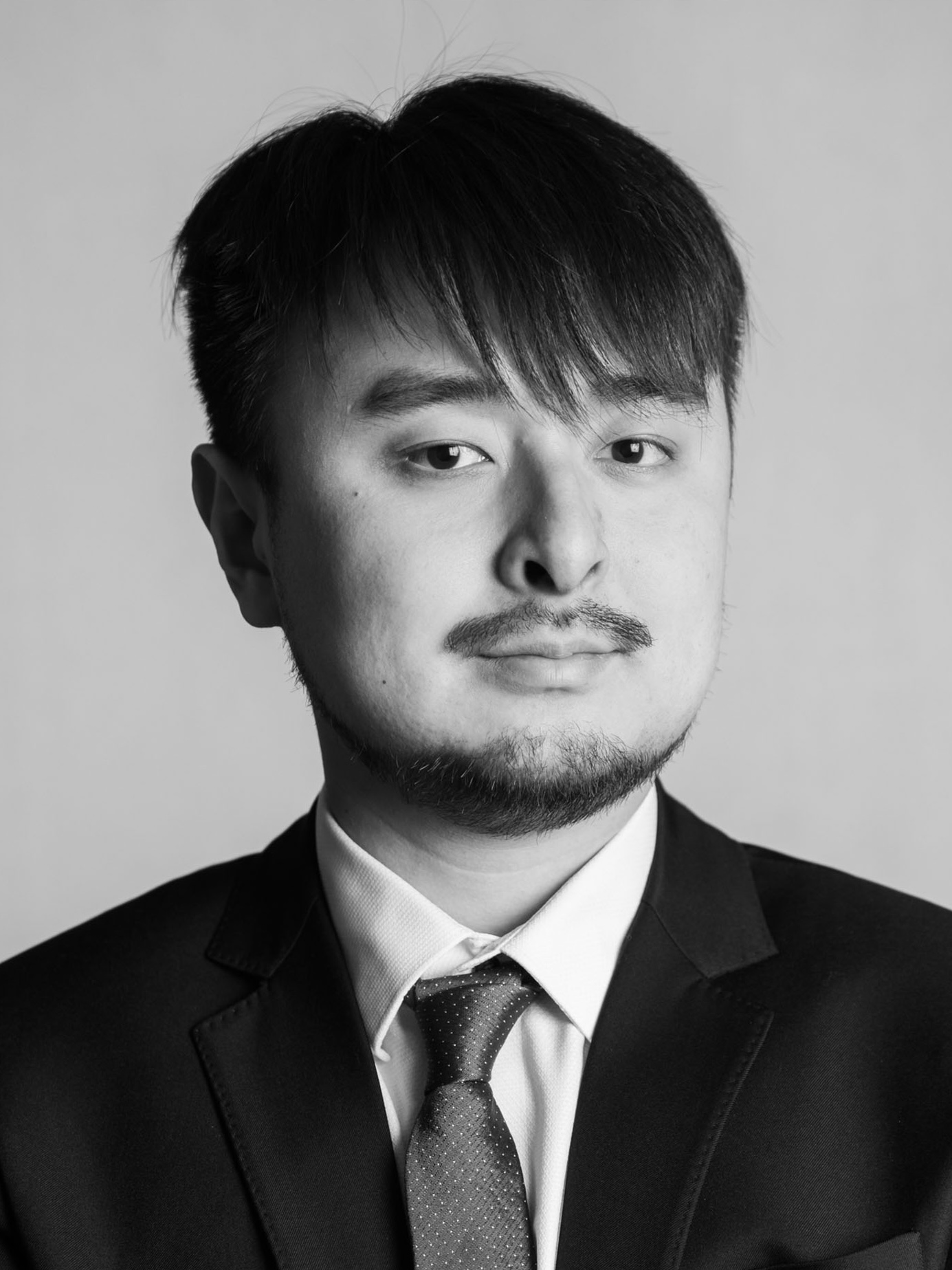
Tsay in 2023

The defender was identified as Brandon Tsay (born 1996 or 1997) is an American hobbyist computer programmer who disarmed the gunman. His parents are Tom Tsay and Yvonne Hwei Fung Lin, both Americans born to Taiwanese immigrants. She died of lung cancer in December 2017.

He attended Pasadena City College and lives in San Marino, California. Tsay was job-seeking while working at his parents' Lai Lai Ballroom & Studio in Alhambra.

The local police department awarded Tsay a medal of courage for his actions. Tsay appeared on CNN, Good Morning America and in the New York Times talking about his intervention. United States Representative Judy Chu honored Tsay at a city of Alhambra Lunar New Year ceremony in February 2023 saying that "The carnage would have been so much worse had it not been for Brandon Tsay." California Governor Gavin Newsom visited Tsay after the event. US President Joe Biden invited Tsay to the 2023 State of the Union Address. Tsay attended as a guest of Jill Biden. President Biden thanked Tsay for his life-saving actions, before Congress gave him a standing ovation.

Tsay collaborated with the Asian Pacific Community Fund to launch the Brandon Tsay Hero Fund, aiming to help local community causes. Monterey Park City Council honored Tsay on February 15, 2023.

== Perpetrator ==
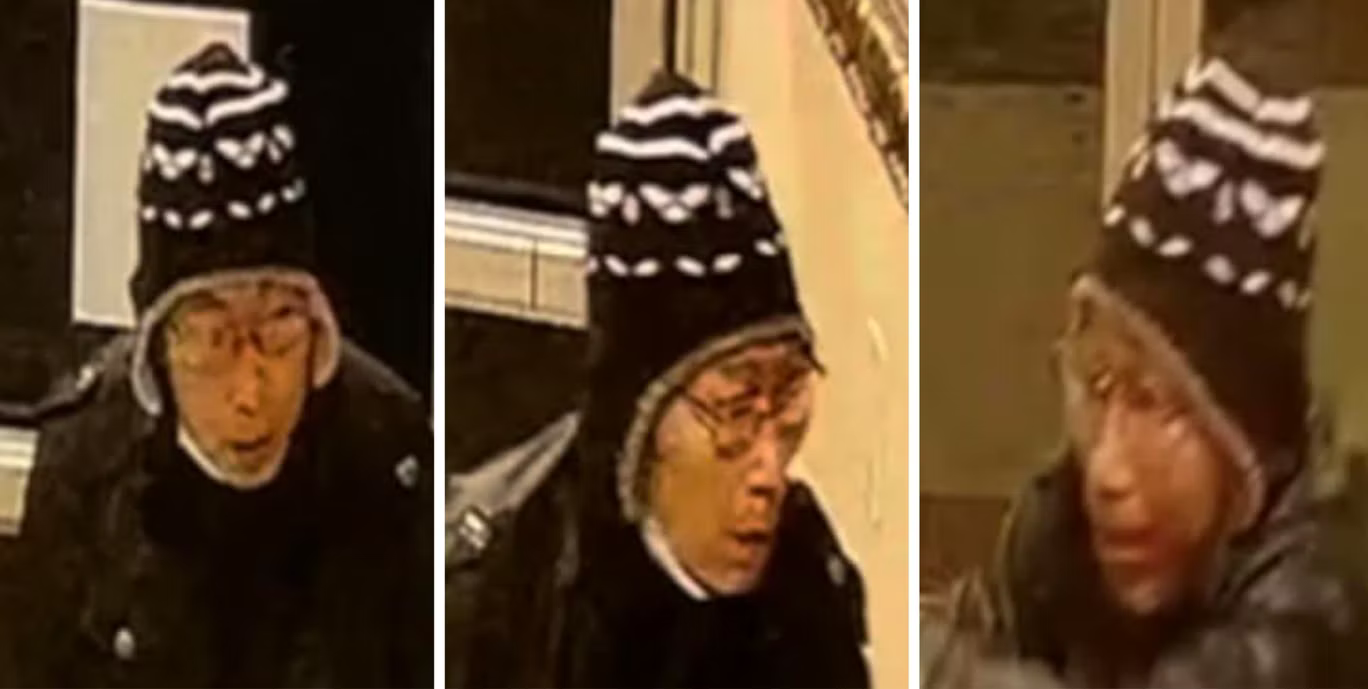
Huu Can Tran during the shooting

The perpetrator was identified as 72-year-old Huu Can Tran (Note: Huu Can Tran: Vietnamese: Trần Hữu Cần traditional Chinese: 陳友勤; simplified Chinese: 陈友勤; pinyin: Chén Yǒuqín) (August 15, 1950 – January 22, 2023). According to different documents, he was reportedly from China or Vietnam; police stated that Tran was of Vietnamese origin, but had also lived in Hong Kong in the past. According to friends' accounts, Tran stated that he was born in the State of Vietnam to a wealthy family, but was sent to Taiwan in his youth to study electrical engineering after he cut off a person's hand during a physical altercation. He claimed to have begun a life in organized crime there, which would continue after moving to Hong Kong. He was repeatedly threatened with disownment by his family, though they ultimately remained in contact.

Tran eventually immigrated to the United States, working various jobs, including truck driving and carpet cleaning, residing in Texas for several years before moving to San Gabriel, California in August 1989. He became a naturalized U.S. citizen in 1990 or 1991. In 2013, he sold his San Gabriel home, which was a five-minute drive away from the Star Ballroom. In 2020, Tran bought a double-wide trailer in a senior community at a mobile home park in Hemet, a suburb about 85 miles (137 km) east of Los Angeles. He lived there at the time of the shooting.

In the late-1990s, Tran met his wife-to-be at the Star Ballroom Dance Studio, where he taught informal dance lessons and was a regular patron; they were married in 2001. Four years later, Tran filed for a divorce, which was approved in 2006. His ex-wife stated that he was never violent while around her but was "quick to anger". He frequented both Star Ballroom and Lai Lai several years ago, sometimes volunteering as a dance instructor, but ended up clashing with the people there. According to the sheriff, Tran had not been to Star Ballroom in at least five years and did not appear to be targeting specific victims. According to the police department in Hemet, where Tran lived, he visited the station there on January 7 and January 9 alleging that his family was poisoning him and trying to steal money from him. He was asked to return with evidence but never did.

In November 1990, Tran was arrested by San Gabriel Police for unlawful possession of a firearm. He had called police to a possible robbery at a liquor store and offered to lead the responding officer to where he had last seen the suspect. The officer agreed to drive him to the location and performed a pat-down on Tran beforehand, finding a Röhm RG-40 .38 caliber revolver in his jacket, which Tran claimed to have taken from home "for protection" while pursuing the suspect. The unlawful possession charge was ultimately dropped. Tran had a history of multiple 911 hangups and domestic disturbance incidents according to records from the San Gabriel Police Department. The earliest recorded instance was on December 26, 1992, when Tran called police to his address about being threatened, later telling the arriving officer that the husband of his girlfriend, who were in the middle of a divorce, had connections to a "Taiwanese gang" and was trying to kill him.

Three weeks later in January 1993, Tran reported that he found 49 shotgun shells on his front lawn which he believed were meant as a threat against his life, but did not request help, reasoning that he called "only to make the police department aware of the situation in case something happened". Police ended up contacting the husband, who denied Tran's allegations and told officers that Tran had been calling his landline at night repeatedly for the last month. Tran made similar claims later in 1999, saying that he had been consistently receiving calls for nine months, with the person on the other end remaining silent whenever he picked up the phone. An earlier attempt made by police to tap his phone with a recording device at Tran's request failed due to a "malfunction" shortly after installation.

After the shooting, authorities searched Tran's home pursuant to a search warrant. Law enforcement found a Savage Arms .308 caliber bolt-action rifle, hundreds of rounds of ammunition, and items suggesting that Tran was manufacturing suppressors. A letter, written in Chinese and addressed to law enforcement, was also recovered, but its contents have not been released.

According to nonprofit research center the Violence Project, at 72 years of age, Tran became the oldest person to fatally shoot four or more people in a public space since at least 1966, excluding domestic and gang-related disputes. He also became the second person in their 70s to carry out a public mass shooting in US history; the first was a 70-year-old who killed five people in Allen, Kentucky, in 1981. In comparison, the average age of mass shooters is 33, thereby making Tran more than twice as old as many mass shooters in the US.

== Reactions ==
During the manhunt for the gunman, President Joe Biden instructed the Federal Bureau of Investigation to provide full support to the local authorities. He later offered condolences and ordered flags at the White House to be flown at half-staff. Los Angeles Mayor Karen Bass called the shooting "absolutely devastating", and Governor Gavin Newsom said that he was "monitoring the situation closely". In the days after the shooting, Newsom visited Tsay to thank him for his heroism, and attended a meeting between the victims in hospital.

The second day of Monterey Park's Lunar New Year festival was canceled. Security preparations were stepped up ahead of Lunar New Year celebrations in New York City, Miami, and Los Angeles.

Moments of silence across the country were held at Lunar New Year festivities as well as sporting events involving teams from Los Angeles.

It became the deadliest mass shooting in the history of Los Angeles County, exceeding the death toll of a massacre in Covina in 2008. The Monterey Park shooting was the second of three mass shootings in California in about a week, preceded by a house shooting in Goshen and followed by another shooting in Half Moon Bay, the three shootings killing a combined total of 24 people. It was also the fifth mass killing in the United States since the beginning of 2023.

In January 2025, a law firm filed a lawsuit on behalf of four of the dead victims and one of the wounded survivors against the estate of the shooter as well as the Star Ballroom, alleging that the latter business failed to protect its patrons.

== See also ==
- List of mass shootings in the United States in 2023
- List of shootings in California
