= 2023 Half Moon Bay shootings =

Spree shooting in California, U.S.

- Location of Half Moon Bay within California
- Half Moon Bay, California Half Moon Bay shootings
- Location: 37°28′12.4″N 122°25′8.4″W; Half Moon Bay, California, U.S.
- Date: January 23, 2023 c. 2:20 p.m. (PST)
- Attack type: Mass shooting, workplace violence, spree shooting
- Weapon: Glock 17 semi-automatic pistol
- Deaths: 7
- Injuries: 1
- Accused: Chunli Zhao
- Charges: First-degree murder with special circumstances (7 counts); Attempted first-degree murder

On January 23, 2023, a spree shooting occurred at two nearby farms in Half Moon Bay, California. Seven people were killed and an eighth person was critically injured before the suspect, 66-year-old Chunli Zhao, was arrested after parking his car outside a nearby sheriff's office.

The shooting was the deadliest mass shooting in San Mateo County history.

== Background ==
Half Moon Bay is a coastal, agricultural, and tourist city approximately 30 miles (48 kilometers) south of San Francisco. According to the vice mayor of Half Moon Bay, it is difficult for those who are undocumented or not in the country legally, including some of the workers at California Terra Garden and in the city's farming community at large, to seek help from local authorities.

=== Prior shooting incident ===
In July 2022, seven months before the shootings, another worker at California Terra Garden, Martin Medina, allegedly opened fire with a handgun at the trailer of a coworker, Yetao Bing, following a dispute. Bing was not injured. Medina was later charged with attempted murder and criminal threats, as well as shooting into an occupied dwelling. Bing became one of the fatal victims in the 2023 shooting.

In July 2024, Medina was convicted by jury of attempted murder with a firearm and premeditation and on August 30, 2024, he was denied probation and sentenced to 18 years in prison.

== Shootings ==
At 2:22 p.m. PST (UTC-8), first responders were notified of a shooting at Mountain Mushroom Farm located in Half Moon Bay. Upon arriving at the farm, they discovered four deceased individuals with gunshot wounds. A fifth victim who survived was airlifted by helicopter to Stanford University Medical Center near Palo Alto, with life-threatening injuries. As responders were arriving at the scene, the gunman drove two miles (3.2 km) away to Concord Farms in a maroon SUV, where he fatally shot three more people. Some of the victims were his coworkers. Several children were also present at that shooting scene, but they were left unharmed.

At approximately 4:40 p.m., the suspect, Chunli Zhao, who was a resident and worker at the first farm, was found in his vehicle in the parking lot of the San Mateo County Sheriff's Office substation at 557 Kelly Avenue in downtown Half Moon Bay. He was taken into custody without incident and the weapon used, a Glock-17 semiautomatic pistol, was located inside his vehicle.

== Victims ==
The victims were identified as Yetao Bing, 43; Qizhong Cheng, 66; Zhishen Liu, 73; Jingzhi Lu, 64; Marciano Martinez Jimenez, 50; Jose Romero Perez, 38; and Aixiang Zhang, 74. Five of them were Chinese citizens according to China's consulate in San Francisco, which strongly condemned the violence. The other two were Mexican nationals.

The wounded victim was 23-year-old Pedro Felix Romero Perez, a younger brother of Jose, who was among the dead in the rampage. Pedro was shot five times; he was shot once in the hip, once in the back, once in the elbow, and twice in the stomach.

== Accused ==
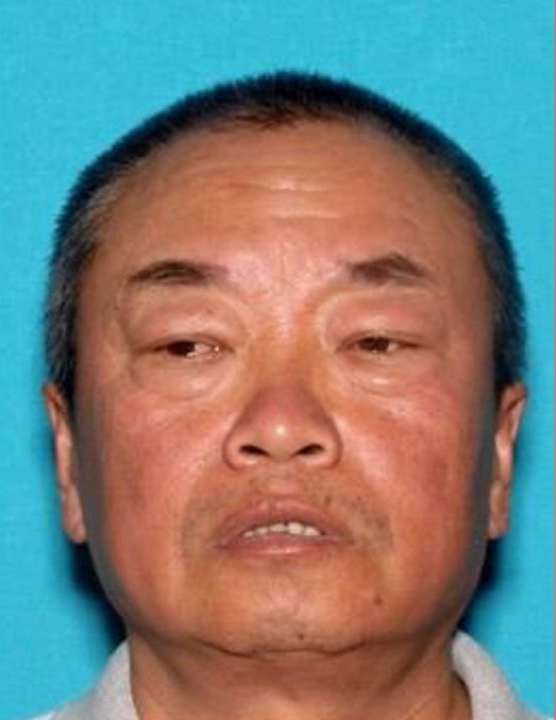
Undated California driver's license photo of Zhao

The district attorney said the accused, 66-year-old Chunli Zhao, was from China and had lived in the United States for at least a decade. Zhao stated that he had immigrated with a green card around 2011. He was employed at Mountain Mushroom Farm, the first shooting location, and formerly worked at Concord Farms, the second location. He stayed with 34 other employees in 2022 when Mountain Mushroom Farm's ownership was changed to California Terra Garden.

Officials initially did not disclose any previous criminal record, but stated that it "didn't rise to any significant concern". The San Francisco Chronicle wrote that in March 2013, Yinjiu Wang, Zhao's roommate and former co-worker at a restaurant in San Jose, accused Zhao in an assault case. Wang alleged that Zhao, who had recently quit his job, asked for leftover paychecks before attempting to smother Wang with a pillow. Wang fought Zhao off after a physical struggle, but two days later, Zhao appeared at the restaurant to be rehired and threatened to "split [Wang's] head" with a knife. Wang successfully filed for a restraining order, which ran out in July 2013, after a judge refused to extend the order. Another restaurant in Cupertino stated that Zhao worked for them around 2011 and was fired over an incident in which he attempted to suffocate a co-worker over a money dispute.

Zhao later expressed personal grievances at his workplace to investigators and during a jailhouse interview, which ranged from being bullied, working long hours, and his supervisor, who was killed during the attack, demanding that Zhao pay $100 for a forklift repair after a collision during work. Zhao expressed regret for carrying out the shootings. Officials have described the shootings as "workplace violence."

== Legal proceedings ==
In January 2023, Zhao was charged with seven counts of murder, one count of attempted murder, firearm use enhancements, and a count of special circumstance allegation of multiple murder.

Zhao was indicted on seven counts of first-degree murder on January 23, 2024. District Attorney Stephen Wagstaffe announced that he would seek the death penalty in the case. As of February 2026, the trial is set for early 2027. The case is under a gag order which restricts all parties from discussing facts or opinions about the case publicly.

== Reactions ==
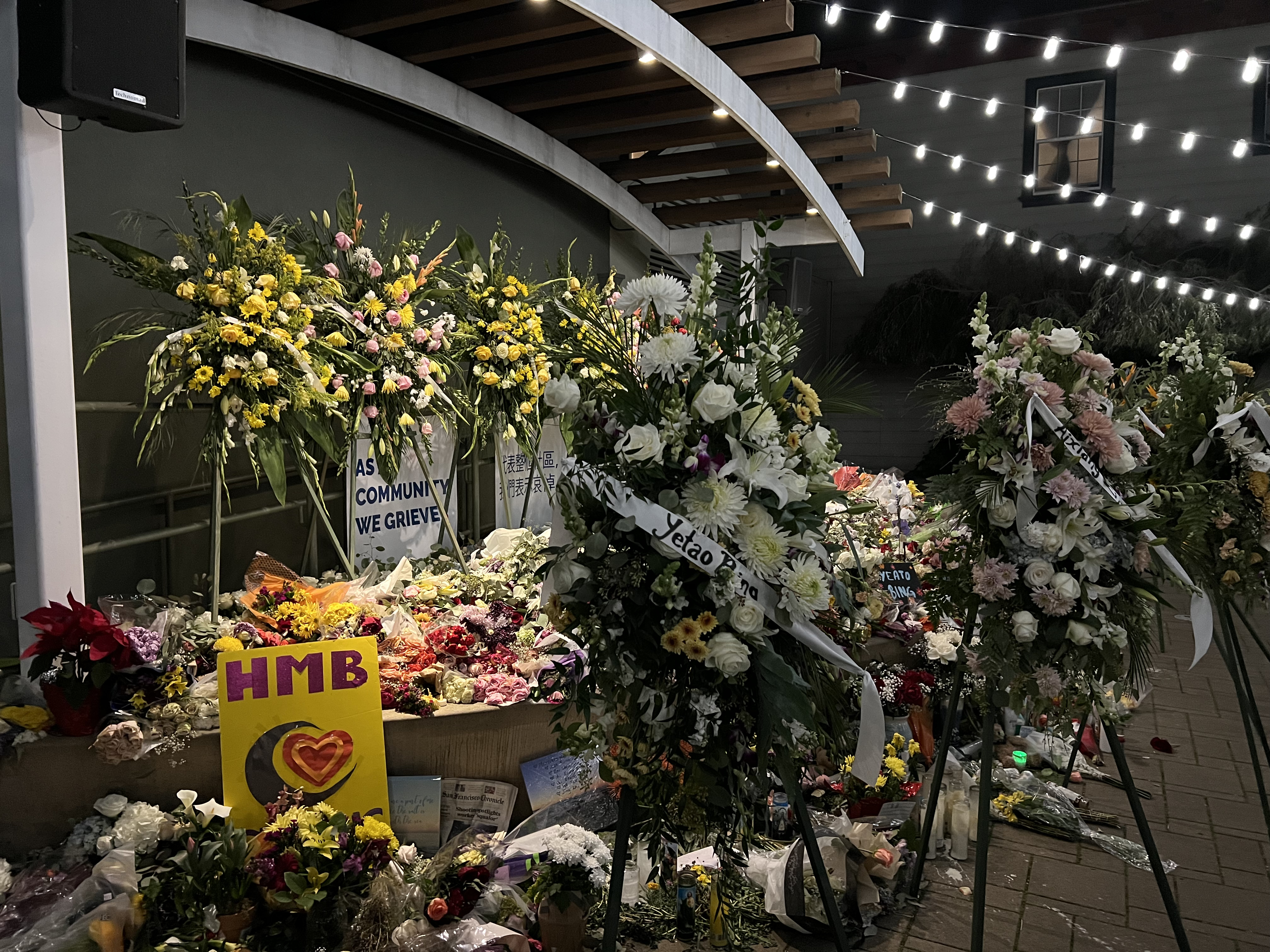
A memorial to the victims of the shooting on February 6, 2023, in Half Moon Bay

In a press briefing, White House Press Secretary Karine Jean-Pierre expressed that President Joe Biden had directed federal law enforcement to help local authorities during their investigations. Governor of California Gavin Newsom was informed of the shooting while visiting the hospitalized victims of the Monterey Park shooting of less than 48 hours earlier, describing the two events in conjunction as "tragedy upon tragedy."

The living conditions of the workers at California Terra Garden drew attention following reports that many of them lived in shipping or storage containers and the site did not follow all permit and code requirements. Some were also paid below the minimum legal wage in California. The company later said it would improve the housing for workers and their families.

According to the Gun Violence Archive, which defines mass shootings as ones with four or more casualties (excluding the shooter), the Half Moon Bay shootings as a whole were the 37th mass shooting in the U.S. in 2023. According to Mother Jones, which excludes mass shootings in the context of robbery, gang violence or domestic abuse, it was the second mass shooting that year.

== See also ==
- List of mass shootings in the United States in 2023
- List of shootings in California
