= Rancho Tehama shootings =

2017 spree shooting in California, U.S.

- Location in California Rancho Tehama shootings (California)
- Location: 40.0010077°N 122.3997226°W (Neal's home); Rancho Tehama, California, U.S.
- Date: November 13–14, 2017; 7:54 – 8:19 a.m. (Pacific Time Zone)
- Attack type: Mass shooting; spree shooting; murder-suicide; uxoricide; school shooting
- Weapon: .40-caliber Smith & Wesson pistol; .45-caliber Glock pistol; Two semi-automatic rifles
- Deaths: 6 (including the perpetrator and the perpetrator's wife at home)
- Injuries: 18 (11 by gunfire)
- Perpetrator: Kevin Janson Neal
- Coroner: Tehama County Coroner's Office

On November 13–14, 2017, a series of shootings occurred in Rancho Tehama, an unincorporated community in Tehama County, California, United States. The gunman, 44-year-old Kevin Janson Neal, died by suicide after a Corning police officer rammed and stopped his stolen vehicle. During the shooting spree, five people were killed and eighteen others were injured at eight separate crime scenes, including an elementary school. Ten people suffered bullet wounds and eight were cut by flying glass caused by the gunfire. The injured victims were transported to several area clinics and hospitals.

At the time of the spree, Neal had been freed on bail pending trial for two alleged felonies, and five alleged misdemeanors. Nine months before the shooting rampage, a judge had issued Neal a restraining order at a neighbor's request and ordered him to surrender his guns. The restraining order expired in September, but was renewed before the shootings. He manufactured the rifle and possessed the handguns in violation of that restraining order. At least one unregistered semi-automatic homemade rifle and two borrowed semi-automatic pistols were used. The shootings led to domestic and international debate over the control of homemade guns and gun-licensing law in the United States.

== Background ==
Rancho Tehama is a remote, sparsely populated, rural unincorporated community in Tehama County, California, that had a population of 1,485 in 2010. The community is located 120 miles (190 kilometers) northwest of Sacramento, 25 miles (40 km) southwest of Red Bluff, and 25 miles (40 km) northwest of Corning. Forty-three percent of the town's residents fall below the federal poverty level. The community lies amidst rolling hills of oak and pine trees with views of Mount Shasta and Lassen Peak. The area has a variety of wildlife with scattered domestic cattle grazing. Major stores, social services, and medical care—including a hospital emergency room—are in Red Bluff and Corning.

== Shootings ==
The killings started on the night of November 13 at Neal's home in Rancho Tehama, 6970 Bobcat Lane at Fawn Lane, when Neal shot his wife, Barbara Glisan (also spelled Gilsan) and hid her body under some floorboards. The next day Neal went on a shooting rampage, first killing a man and a woman, both neighbors who he erroneously suspected were dealing methamphetamine.

After killing his neighbors, Neal stole a pickup truck that belonged to one of his victims. He then began firing at random vehicles and pedestrians. At an intersection, he bumped the truck into a vehicle carrying a woman and her three sons. He then drove up to the driver's side, and fired into it, injuring all of them with gunshots or flying glass. The woman was shot five times, four near her heart. She was carrying a gun and had a license to carry, but she was unable to shoot at Neal because he drove away quickly. She stopped four motorists to help her get to the hospital, but they drove off. She finally received aid from an assistant deputy sheriff who called for an ambulance.

At the Rancho Tehama Elementary School, Sarah Lobdell, the school's secretary, heard the gunfire near the school and quickly ordered the school to go on lockdown. A school custodian and the teachers put it into action. Neal crashed the pickup truck through the front gates of the school. He exited the vehicle with a self-assembled AR-15-type semi-automatic rifle, ran into the center of the school's quadrangle, and fired repeatedly at windows and walls. One of Neal's neighbors later claimed that Neal was targeting the seven-year-old son of the neighbor he killed earlier. One student hiding under a classroom desk was shot and injured by a bullet that penetrated a wall. A six-year-old student was also injured by a gunshot to the chest. A woman was also shot when she attempted to distract Neal from the school. Nearly 100 rounds of ammunition were fired into the school. Recorded video shows Neal going into a field behind the school and firing into the air, apparently in frustration at being locked out of the classrooms. Afterwards, Neal apparently discarded the rifle outside the school.

After fleeing the school, Neal crashed the pickup truck into another vehicle and fired at the two occupants as they tried to flee; the female driver was killed, and her husband was wounded in the legs. The man survived after pleading with Neal for his life. A passerby, unaware of the shootings, stopped his car and asked Neal if he was okay; Neal shot and wounded him, stole his car, and continued the rampage, killing another person. At some point, Neal put 15 bullets through a vehicle with a man named Cardenas in it, striking the man once in the leg and injuring him with shrapnel.

As Neal was chasing an innocent victim and shooting at them from his car, he was being pursued by law enforcement. The stolen truck was ultimately rammed by two law enforcement officers, one from the Corning Police Department, who responded from the city of Corning to assist the sheriff's office, and a Tehama County Sheriff's deputy. As the truck came to a stop Neal fired at the officers, who exchanged heavy gunfire with him. No officers were wounded, but their vehicle was struck five times by Neals gunfire. Neal then killed himself with a shot above his left eye. The 25-minute attack took place at eight crime scenes using one semi-automatic homemade rifle and two semi-automatic pistols. His motive remains unclear. Two handguns and another AR-15-type rifle were recovered near his body. The handguns were not registered to him. The first shooting report to 9-1-1 was placed at 7:54 a.m., and Neal died at 8:19 a.m.—a duration of 25 minutes.

== Victims ==
Casualties
Killed
Targeted shootings: Barbara Ann Glisan (aka Gilsan), 38 (Neal's wife, shot at their home); Danny Lee Elliott, 38 (Neal's neighbor, shot at home); Diana Lee Steele, 68 (Elliott's mother, shot at home)
Random killings: Joseph Edward McHugh III, 56 (shot outside his house); Michelle Iris McFadyen, 55 (injured in car crash, shot and killed on the side of the road)
Perpetrator: Kevin Janson Neal, 44 (died by suicide)
Wounded
By bullets: Tiffany Nai Phommathep, 31 (shot in vehicle); John Phommathep Jr., 10 (Tiffany's son, shot in vehicle); Jake Phommathep, 6 (Tiffany's son, shot in vehicle); James Woods Sr. (shot in vehicle); James Woods Jr., 20 (shot in vehicle); Jessie Allen Sanders, 39 (shot near elementary school); Francisco Gudino Cardenas (shot in vehicle); Alejandro Hernandez, 6 (shot at elementary school); Troy Lee McFadyen, 59 (Michelle McFadyen's husband, shot near vehicle); Two unidentified people
By broken glass: Nikos Phommathep, 2 (Tiffany's son); Six unidentified children

Five people were killed on the day of the shooting spree, including the perpetrator, who died by suicide after a confrontation with a police officer and a deputy sheriff. A sixth body, that of the shooter's wife 38-year-old Barbara Glisan, was later discovered under the floorboards of their home; she is believed to have been killed the day before. His neighbors, 38-year-old Danny Elliott and 68-year-old Diana Steele with whom he had had previous conflicts, were his first two killings on November 14. The other victims were 56-year-old Joseph McHugh III and 55-year-old Michelle McFadyen; police believe they were randomly targeted.

Eleven other people—six adults and five children—were also shot, but survived. They were taken to Enloe Medical Center in Chico, Saint Elizabeth Community Hospital in Red Bluff, Mercy Medical Center in Redding, or UC Davis Medical Center in Davis for treatment. The victims included two students at Rancho Tehama Elementary School and Michelle McFadyen's husband. One of the injured students, six-year-old Alejandro Hernandez, was the youngest victim; he was shot in the chest and leg, had to be airlifted to UC Davis, and required multiple surgeries. In addition, seven children suffered injuries from shattered glass.

Victims' families were left struggling to pay for medical expenses and some turned to online fundraisers.

== Perpetrator ==
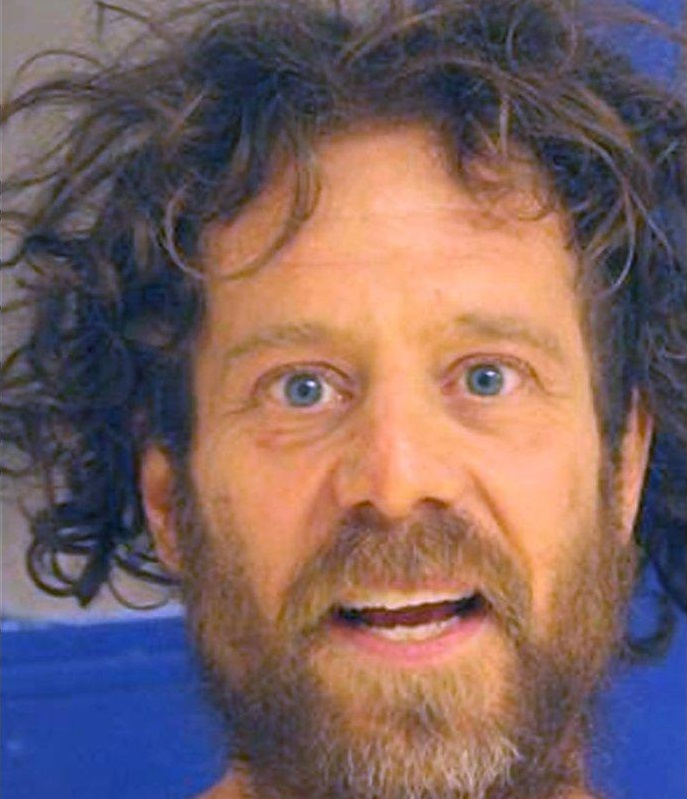
January 2017 mugshot of Neal

Kevin Janson Neal attended East Carolina University from August 2001 to May 2004 but did not qualify for a degree and never declared a major. Relatives said Neal, who moved to California in 2005, had a history of mental illness and anger management issues, as well as an obsession with conspiracy theories. His mother had reportedly noticed a decline in his mental health since 2016.

Neighbors complained to police about Neal firing guns from his property, but whenever sheriff's deputies visited his doorstep, Neal would not respond to their knocking. A neighbor later said he believed Neal might have been testing the response time of law enforcement. In total, deputies were called to Neal's Bobcat Lane home 21 times for various reasons in 2016 and 2017.

On January 31, 2017, Neal was arrested and charged with two felonies, and five misdemeanors, after stabbing neighbor Hailey Poland, assaulting her mother-in-law, and snatching a mobile phone away from them. He was held on US$160,000 bail, which was posted by his mother with a bail bond. His mother also spent $10,000 on legal fees to secure his release. Following his release, Neal continued to harass the neighbors, causing them to successfully seek a restraining order that required him to surrender his firearms and not purchase additional guns. He handed over a single pistol and attested that he had no other guns. Police said that, despite this, he illegally manufactured the guns he used in the shootings. Privately made firearms are currently legal to manufacture in California, but the terms of Neal's restraining order made it illegal for him to possess them, or any other guns. Since January 31, 2018, such guns required a serial number in the state. The two handguns that Neal possessed during his shooting rampage were not registered to him.

The day before the shootings, Neal called his mother to tell her he was "fed up" with his neighbors, whom he suspected of making methamphetamine. He had previously attempted to report his neighbors to the California Department of Forestry and Fire Protection. One of the neighbors involved in the January 31 incident later became one of those killed in the shootings. Although Danny Elliott had meth in his system when Neal killed him and had been put on probation in 2016 for a misdemeanor charge of possessing drug paraphernalia, sheriff's deputies and California Fire officials said they never found evidence of a meth operation, despite multiple visits to Bobcat Lane.

== Aftermath and reactions ==
Governor Jerry Brown, and his wife Anne, offered condolences to all the victims and their families, saying, "Anne and I are saddened to hear about today's violence in Tehama County, which shockingly involved schoolchildren."

The shootings renewed attention on the legality and control of privately made firearms, such as the semi-automatic rifle used in this incident.

Due to the shooting spree, Rancho Tehama Elementary School was closed earlier than planned for the Thanksgiving holiday break and reopened on November 27.

== See also ==
- List of homicides in California
- Gun law in the United States
- Gun laws in California
- Gun politics in the United States
- Gun violence in the United States
- List of rampage killers in the United States
- List of school shootings in the United States by death toll
- List of school shootings in the United States
- List of school-related attacks
- List of shootings in California
- Mass shootings in the United States
- Never Again MSD
