= Norteños =

Group of street gangs in California

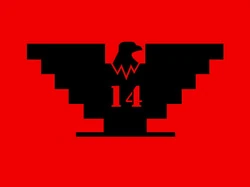
- Founded: 1968; 58 years ago
- Founding location: Salinas, California, U.S.
- Years active: 1968–present
- Territory: Mostly in Northern California, Arizona, New Mexico, Washington (state), Oregon, Nevada, Utah, Idaho, Montana, Wyoming, South Dakota, Colorado, Kansas, Arkansas, Maryland, Virginia, North Carolina, South Carolina, Oklahoma, Illinois, Indiana, Florida, Mexico, Texas,
- Ethnicity: Primarily Mexican Americans, Salvadoran Americans, African Americans, White Americans, Native Americans, and/or Asian Americans
- Criminal activities: Assault; Burglary; Extortion; Murder; Armed robbery; Drug trafficking; Gun trafficking
- Allies: Nuestra Familia
- Notable members: Ryan Mitchell Wood

Norteños (Spanish pronunciation: [noɾˈteɲos], lit. 'Northerners'; Norteñas for females) are the various affiliated gangs that pay tribute to Nuestra Familia while in California state and federal correctional facilities. Norteños may refer to Northern California as Norte Califas. Their biggest rivals are the Sureños from Southern California. As of 2008, the statewide north–south dividing line between Norteños and Sureños was regarded as running through the southern end of the Central Valley. The gang's membership consists primarily of Mexican Americans.

== History ==
In 1968, Mexican American inmates of the California state prison system separated into two rival groups, Norteños (northerners) and Sureños (southerners), according to the locations of their hometowns. Norteños, affiliated with Nuestra Familia, were prison enemies of the Southern Latinos, who are composed of members and affiliates of La eMè, better known as the Mexican Mafia. While La eMè had initially been created to protect Mexicans in prison, there was a perceived level of abuse by members of La eMe towards the imprisoned Latinos from rural farming areas of Northern California. The spark that led to the ongoing war between Norteños and members of the Mexican Mafia involved a situation in which a La eMe member allegedly stole a pair of shoes from a Northerner. This event put into motion the longest-running gang war in the state of California and the founding of Nuestra Familia.

== Culture ==
Norteños use the number 14, which represents the fourteenth letter of the English alphabet, the letter N, in order to pay allegiance to Nuestra Familia. It is sometimes written in Roman numerals as XIV, or a hybrid of Roman and Arabic numerals, X4. Norteños use the color red to signify affiliation. Some Norteños will tattoo themselves with four dots. The Norteños commonly use a whistle chirp, which is derived from Mexican rancho calls. These are also used by other gangs such as Surenos, Crips, and other groups in intercity areas. They are most often used to warn others about police activity in the area, but for the Norteños, they are mostly used to show affiliation. A Norteño could shout "shaooo," which is a common way to show affiliation for Norteños. A Norteño derogatorily refers to a Sureño as a "scrap" (Hispanicized scrapa) or "Sur rat" (south rat). Norteños also use images of the Mexican American labor movement, such as the sombrero, machete, and the logo of the United Farm Workers, which is a stylized black Aztec eagle ("Huelga bird").

== Notable events ==
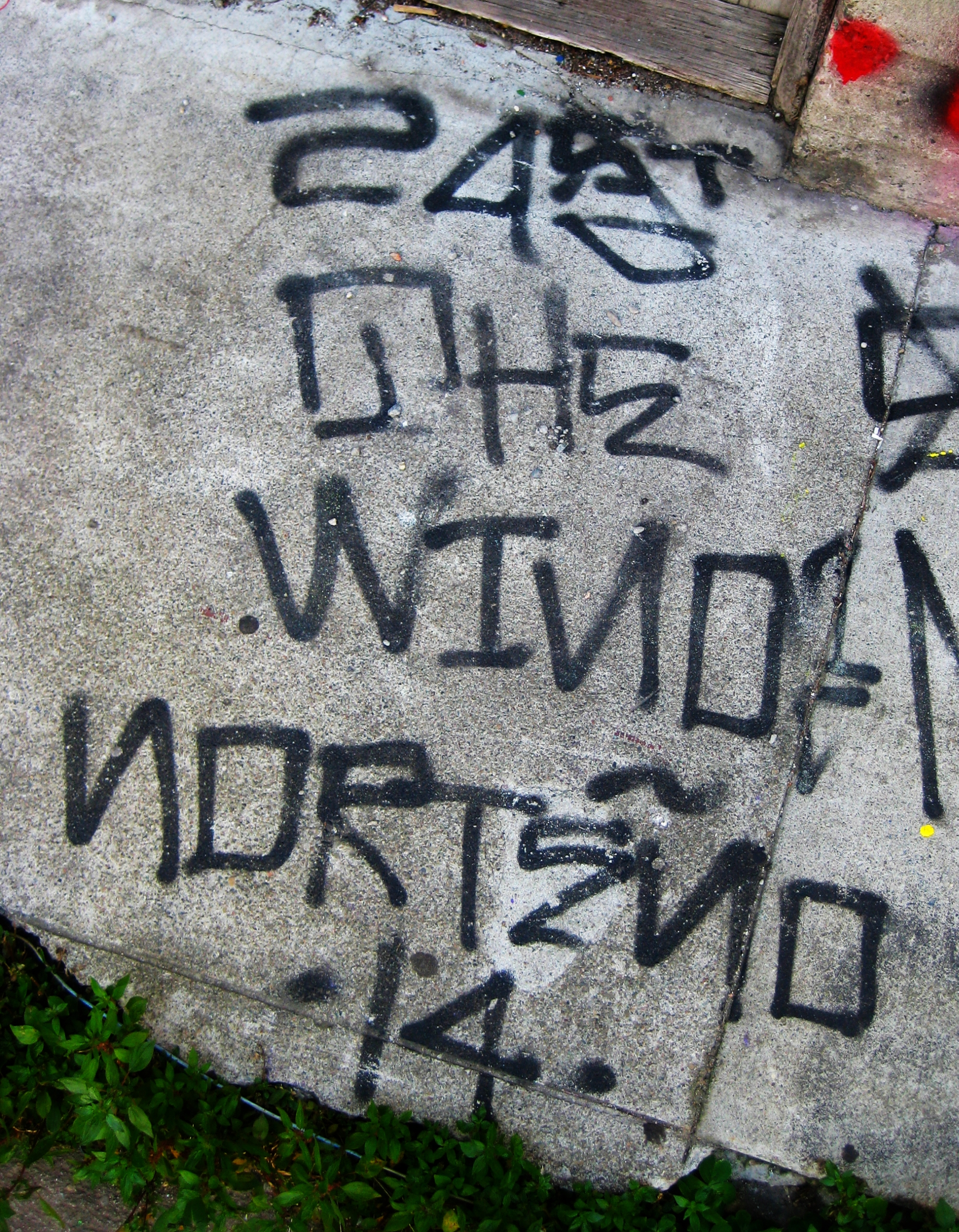
Tagging (graffiti) to vandalize a rival gang's territory

On January 9, 2005, in Ceres, California, in Stanislaus County, Officer Sam Ryno was the first to respond to a call about a man with a gun in front of George's Liquors. Andres Raya, a U.S. Marine on leave after serving in Iraq, was armed with an SKS rifle and opened fire on officers, hitting Officer Ryno and killing Sergeant Stevenson. 9 Norteños gang member including Raya were shot dead some time later after a shootout with SWAT team officers

Law enforcement officials claimed Raya had been involved in gangs for years prior to his signing up for military service. Modesto authorities discovered information during the investigation into the shooting that shows Raya was a Norteño gang member who was not involved in combat during his tour of duty in Iraq. A cooperative effort between local law enforcement, federal, and military agencies revealed a large amount of information about Raya in a short amount of time.

In August 2013, a bloody shootout occurred between documented Norteños and Sureños which resulted in 3 people killed and 4 wounded at Taco Choice, a Mexican restaurant and bar in Salinas, California. Several gunmen were charged with first degree homicide and attempted murder

=== Operation Black Widow ===
Federal law enforcement agencies, long unable to infiltrate the group, began to step up their investigations in the late 1990s. In 2000 and 2001, 22 members were indicted on Racketeer Influenced and Corrupt Organizations Act (RICO) charges, including several who were allegedly serving as high-ranking gang leaders while confined in Pelican Bay State Prison in northern California. Thirteen of the defendants pleaded guilty; the other cases are still ongoing. Two of the defendants face the death penalty for ordering murders related to the drug trafficking. The largest of the federal investigations was Operation Black Widow. In the aftermath of Operation Black Widow, the five highest-ranking leaders of the Norteños were transferred to a federal supermax prison in Florence, Colorado.

=== Goshen murders ===
On February 3, 2023, two alleged Norteño gang members, Noah David Beard and Angel "Nanu" Uriarte, were arrested for the January 16, 2023, murders of six people in Goshen, California. Among the six victims were a 16-year-old mother, Alissa Parraz, and her 10-month-old baby, Nycholas Parraz, both reportedly shot in the head. Surveillance video released by authorities showed the teenage mother running outside, placing the infant on the other side of a fence, then jumping over it herself. Authorities alleged that it was Beard who killed them. Both mother and son were found dead in the street, shot in the back of the head.
