= Fresno shootings =

Fresno shootings may refer to:

- 2012 Fresno meat plant shooting
- 2017 Fresno shootings, which occurred at a Motel 6 and the downtown area
- 2019 Fresno shooting, which occurred at a football watch party
