= Saint Elizabeth Community Hospital =

Geography
- Location: 2550 Sister Mary Columba Dr, Red Bluff, California, United States
- Coordinates: 40.1486°N 122.2212°W

Organization
- Type: Community
- Network: Dignity Health

Services
- Emergency department: Level III trauma center
- Beds: 76

Links
- Website: Official website
- Lists: Hospitals in California

Saint Elizabeth Community Hospital is a 76-bed campus located in Red Bluff, California. The hospital is part of the Dignity Health network. It has a level-III trauma emergency department.

On November 14, 2017, several victims of the Rancho Tehama shootings were taken to Saint Elizabeth's emergency department for treatment.

== Awards ==
- Thomson Reuters 100 Top Hospital in the Nation for seven consecutive years.
