= Ryan Mitchell Wood =

American rapper (1975-2007)

Woodie
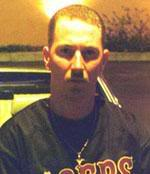

Background information
- Born: Ryan Mitchell Wood; November 20, 1975; Antioch, California, U.S.
- Died: March 7, 2007 (aged 31) Florence, Oregon, U.S.
- Cause of death: Suicide by gunshot
- Genres: Hip hop, gangsta rap, West Coast hip hop
- Occupations: Rapper; record producer; songwriter; lyricist
- Years active: 1998–2007
- Label: East Co Co Records (1998)

Ryan Mitchell Wood (November 20, 1975 – March 7, 2007), also known as Woodie, was an American rapper, record producer, songwriter, lyricist, and street gangster from Antioch, California, who was affiliated with the Norteños gang. He was recognized for his fast-paced style and introspective lyrics, often reflecting on real-life experiences and dilemmas. Wood's music, which included references to gang life, violence, corruption in the government and personal conscience, resonated with many fans and offered a platform for other emerging artists.

== Early life and career ==
Born and raised in Antioch, Wood grew up in an environment filled with gangs, drugs, violence, and crime. He became immersed in gang life at a very young age and joined the Norteños street gang at only 14 years old. He served a one-year prison sentence for assault with a deadly weapon. He served his prison sentence at Folsom State Prison.

Fed up with a life of gang-related violence, Wood dedicated himself to rap, he had an interest in break dancing and hip-hop at a young age and started rapping in high school at the age of 15 where he quickly rose through the ranks of the California Bay Area's underground scene eventually signing with Koch Records. And in 1995, a fellow member and friend of Wood's named Gabriel "Snoop" Roberson, was connected to homicide that took place at a girl's coming of age party, and ultimately tried and convicted on four counts of attempted murder, and one count of murder. Roberson denied committing the murders, and his case obtained notability due to Wood's references of the events and proclamation that Roberson was innocent, and falsely imprisoned. Roberson's loyalty is mentioned throughout Wood's music, due to Roberson never telling the truth about what happened. In 2020, the case was examined for a parole hearing, after Roberson brought up a lack of evidence, and despite fans of Wood speculating that Roberson took the fall for a crime Wood may have committed, the parole board denied Roberson's parole requests. Roberson is up for a new parole hearing every ten years due to being a minor when the crime happened.

Another friend of Wood, Carlos "Blackbird" Ramirez was also wanted for the shooting. But he vanished for some time and a manhunt started. After four years, Ramirez reappeared in Antioch he allegedly showed up at his ex-girlfriends where he took both their kids and barricaded himself in the house. After a multi-day standoff with the police, both Ramirez and his two daughters died from gunshot wounds. Antioch police stated Ramirez had fatally shot his daughters before ultimately turning the weapon on himself. But Wood had insisted that both Ramirez and his two daughters were killed by the Antioch police. He mentioned the fact that Ramirez had two fatal gunshot wounds to the head. In Wood's song called "Mind Games", Ramirez can be heard talking about a tragic event that took place a few years before. In the song, Wood stated how, the police might have killed Ramirez's daughters and how they knew Roberson was innocent and decided to imprison him anyway.

In 1997, Wood initiated his own music label, East Co. Co. Records. Following this, he finalized his first solo album, "Yoc Influenced," which was released in 1998. Alongside D-Small as the executive producer, Wood's label put out its inaugural compilation, "Northern Expozure Vol. 1," in 1999, featuring the standout track "Norte Sidin." Soon, underground gangsta rap magazine Murder Dog was praising his work, introducing Wood to a national audience. This underground success culminated with Woodie being offered a record deal with Koch, a large nationally distributed label with plenty of money and clout. Wood's first release for Koch, "Demonz in My Sleep" showcased both his skills as an MC and as a producer. He produced all but three of his album songs, Although Wood never made it mainstream, his music is still popular in the Bay Area and other parts of Northern California.

== Death ==
On March 7, 2007, Wood's life came to an end under circumstances that are still not entirely clear, his death is veiled in mystery. While some reports suggest he took his own life in Florence, Oregon, official records to confirm these details have not been located. Some believe that he drank himself into a deep and dark depression because he was responsible for the murder that Gabriel "Snoop" Roberson is serving life in prison for. Wood never hired an appeal lawyer and never confessed to the shooting, despite letting Roberson know that eventually he would do so. Rapper A-Wax released a single named "East Co Co", in which it is alleged that Wood left a will and a confession tape before he died. Rumors of a confession tape have been denied.

On November 3, 2025 Gabriel Snoop Roberson came to a plea agreement with the East Contra Costa prosecutor, Roberson pleaded no contest to voluntary manslaughter, four counts of attempted murder, and gang enhancement. He was resentenced to 35 years with credit for time served he will be released after 5 years with a projected released date in 2030. due to sentencing guidelines he will leave prison in 2027.

In 2018, a memorial headstone installed at Holy Cross Cemetery in Antioch in honor of Wood was reported stolen. The theft of the headstone was met with shock and sadness from his community, who viewed it as a deeply disrespectful act.
