= Marcus Wesson =

American mass murderer (born 1946)

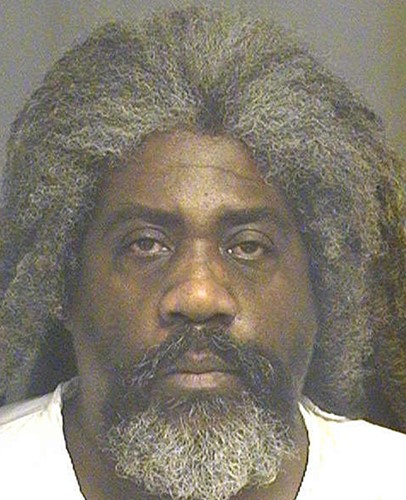
- Born: Marcus Delon Wesson; August 22, 1946 (age 80); Kansas City, Missouri, U.S.
- Children: 16+
- Status: Incarcerated
- Conviction: First degree murder with special circumstances (9 Counts)
- Penalty: Death (de jure)

Details
- Victims: 9
- Date: March 12, 2004
- Location: Fresno, California
- Target: Family
- Weapon: Stainless-steel Ruger MK II Target .22 caliber handgun

Marcus Delon Wesson (born August 22, 1946) is an American mass murderer and child rapist, convicted of nine counts of first-degree murder and 14 sex crimes, including the rape and molestation of his underage daughters. His victims were his children, fathered through incestuous sexual abuse of his daughters and nieces, as well as his wife's children.

== Early life and education ==
Marcus Wesson was born in Kansas City, Missouri, the eldest of four children of Benjamin and Carrie Wesson. His mother raised him in the Seventh-day Adventist Church. Wesson claimed that his mother was a religious fanatic. His father was an alcoholic child abuser who abandoned his family when Wesson was a child.

After dropping out of high school, Wesson joined the U.S. Army, serving from 1966 to 1968 as an ambulance driver, which included a deployment in the Vietnam War.

== Abuse ==
Shortly after leaving the military, Wesson moved in with an older woman, Rosemary Solorio, and her eight children in San Jose, California. In 1971, Solorio gave birth to Wesson's son. In 1974, Wesson began sexually abusing Solorio's eight-year-old daughter Elizabeth. Wesson married Elizabeth when she was 14 and he was 34. Four months later, she gave birth to her first child. Eventually, Wesson fathered 10 children for Elizabeth, including one infant who died.

One of Elizabeth's younger sisters left her own seven children with them, claiming that her drug problem made her unable to care for them. Wesson never held a steady job; he lived off welfare and forced his working adult children to give him all their earnings. In 1989, Wesson was convicted of welfare fraud and perjury. The family often lived in run-down shacks, boats, and vacant houses.

Wesson was abusive towards his wife and children. He prevented Elizabeth from participating in the children's upbringing. He homeschooled the children and taught them from his own handwritten Bible that focused on Jesus Christ being a vampire. He told the children that he was God and had them refer to him as "Master" or "Lord." He taught the children to be prepared for Armageddon and said that the girls were destined to become Wesson's future wives. Wesson's school "curriculum" involved teaching girls oral sex as young as 8 or 9. Their domestic responsibilities included washing Wesson's dreadlocks and scratching his armpits and head. The girls were not allowed to talk to their male siblings or their mother. Both male and female children were physically abused. Wesson raped two daughters and three nieces beginning at age eight; all five girls became pregnant.

== Murders ==
Before March 12, 2004, Wesson had declared his intention to relocate his daughters and their children to Washington state, where Wesson's parents lived. On March 12, 2004, several members of Wesson's extended family, along with two nieces who rebelled against him, converged on his family compound demanding the release of their children. Fresno police were summoned to what was described as a child custody issue, and a standoff ensued. Wesson told the police to wait at the door and disappeared into the home. When he came back to the door, his clothes were bloodied.

Fresno police testified they did not hear gunshots being fired shortly after, though other witnesses at the standoff testified they did hear gunshots fired at that time. In the aftermath, police discovered nine bodies, including two of Wesson's daughters and a total of seven of their children, in a bedroom filled with antique coffins. Each victim had been fatally shot through the eye. Wesson's other children, who were not present inside the house, survived the incident.

== Victims ==
- Sebhrenah April Wesson (age 25): daughter
- Elizabeth Breahi Kina Wesson (age 17): daughter
- Illabelle Carrie Wesson (age 8): daughter/granddaughter
- Aviv Dominique Wesson (age 7): daughter/grand-niece
- Johnathon St Charles Wesson (age 7): son/grand-nephew
- Ethan St Laurent Wesson (age 4): son/grand-nephew
- Marshey St Christopher Wesson (age 1): son/grandson
- Jeva St Vladensvspry Wesson (age 1): daughter/granddaughter
- Sedona Vadra Wesson (age 1): daughter/grand-niece

== Trial ==
At Wesson's trial, the prosecutor was Chief Deputy District Attorney Lisa Gamoian. Wesson was represented by public defenders Peter Jones and Ralph Torres. They presented the defense that his 25-year-old daughter Sebhrenah committed all the murders, including of her son Marshey, and then committed suicide. The murder weapon, a .22 caliber handgun, was found with her body, and Sebhrenah's DNA was found on the gun, which lent credence to Wesson's claim. There was also no gunpowder residue on Wesson's hands at the time of his arrest. The jury declined to find that Wesson fired the fatal shots but convicted him of murder anyway, presumably finding that he had pressured his children into entering a suicide pact.

== Conviction and sentence ==
Wesson was convicted of nine counts of first-degree murder on June 17, 2005, and also found guilty on 14 counts of forcible rape and the sexual molestation of seven of his daughters and nieces. Wesson was sentenced to death on June 27, 2005, and is currently in California Health Care Facility.

The house that the murders took place in was later demolished.

In November 5, 2026, Gavin Newsom granted and requested the sentence commutings of all 548 inmates on California's death row to life imprisonment without the possibility of parole. Due to Wesson's status as a recidivist offender, his case is currently pending review by the California Supreme Court before clemency can be granted to him.

== See also ==
- List of homicides in California
- List of shootings in California
- List of long-term false imprisonment cases
