= 2012 Fresno meat plant shooting =

Mass shooting in California, U.S.

Fresno meat plant shooting
- Location: 36°45′33″N 119°47′20″W; Valley Protein meat processing plant, Fresno, California, U.S.
- Date: November 6, 2012; 8:20 a.m. (PDT; UTC−07:00)
- Target: Coworkers
- Attack type: Mass shooting, workplace shooting, murder–suicide
- Weapon: COP .357 Magnum four-shot derringer handgun
- Deaths: 3 (including the perpetrator)
- Injuries: 2
- Perpetrator: Lawrence Nathaniel Jones
- Motive: Unknown

On November 6, 2012, a mass shooting occurred at the Valley Protein meat processing plant in central Fresno, California, United States. Two people were killed and another two were injured before the perpetrator, 42-year-old employee Lawrence Nathaniel Jones, killed himself after leaving the premises.

== Shooting ==
On November 6, 2012, Jones started his shift at the plant just before 4:58 in the morning. His coworkers told investigators that he did not appear to "be himself." There were rumors that Jones had a dispute with another employee, but the police were unable to verify it. Managers of Valley Protein later stated that "there were no arguments that ensued, nothing that led up to it."

At 8:20 a.m., Jones, who was about three hours into his shift, walked out of the deboning room of the plant, telling a female coworker to "be careful." He then went to a locker near the men's restroom and retrieved his COP .357 derringer handgun from his backpack.

From there, he walked to the grinding room, where he pressed his gun against the head of 32-year-old Salvador Diaz and pulled the trigger, killing him. Jones then returned to the deboning room and called out to the woman he had warned earlier before fatally wounding Manuel Verdin, 34, in the back of the head. He then shot a 28-year-old coworker in the neck, severely wounding him. A 32-year-old female coworker witnessed the shooting and began running west toward the packaging room. However, Jones saw her and fired another shot, hitting her in the buttocks. The gunshots were muffled by the plant's machinery, along with the workers' protective earwear. Due to this, his first three victims were not aware that a shooting was happening.

He subsequently headed to the Jollibee break room. There, he pointed his gun at the head of another coworker and fired, but was out of ammunition. So he instead walked through the staging room and outside to Hedges Avenue while reloading his weapon. Once he was about 100 yards from his workplace, he shot himself in the head. He was pronounced dead at the hospital three hours later. Verdin was initially recovered alive in critical condition before dying in the hospital.

Sixty-two workers were present when the shooting started, 22 of whom witnessed the shooting. The police believe Jones targeted his victims since he could have shot other employees, but instead walked around them to shoot his targets. All of the victims were new employees.

The plant reopened after a one-day shutdown on November 8, 2011.

== Investigation ==
An autopsy report showed traces of weed in the shooter’s system. A second forensic test was ordered to for the presence of other drugs. Police did not determine a motive. Criminal psychologist Eric Hickey suggested that Jones was "probably just angry" and "didn't care anymore" over his lack of success in life, speculating that he had minor arguments with the victims and planned his suicide after the shooting to avoid returning to prison.

== Perpetrator ==
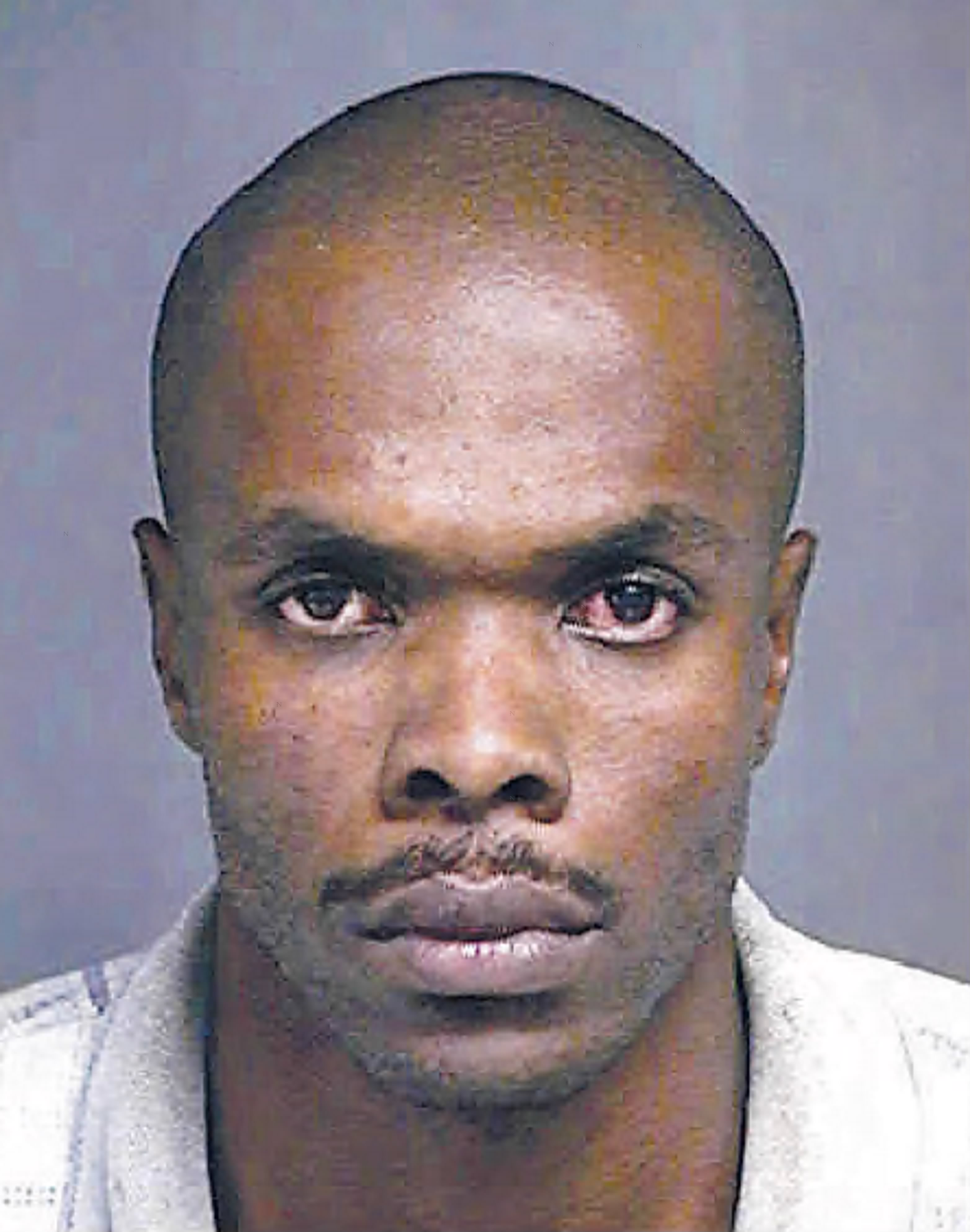
Jones in a mugshot by the Fresno Police Department

Lawrence Nathaniel Jones was a felon with a criminal record dating back to 1991, when he was convicted of second-degree robbery in Alameda County. After serving a three-year prison sentence, he was released in November 1993. In 1995, he was sentenced to 13 years in prison for a separate robbery in Fresno County and released on parole in 2001.

After undergoing a Fresno County mental health evaluation in 2004, Jones was diagnosed with intermittent explosive disorder, drug-induced psychotic disorder, and dependence on multiple substances such as amphetamine, marijuana, and alcohol. In the same year, Jones was convicted of car theft and causing bodily injury after evading an officer while under the influence of alcohol and a drug. He was sentenced to 10 years and eight months in prison. The jail psychiatric services staff described him as mentally unstable, and saw him many times due to aggressive episodes. He often lashed out around court dates and regularly refused medication.

Jones was released on parole in June 2011 and discharged from parole the following May. He began working at the plant in September 2011. His boss and coworkers said he was nice, respectful, and a model employee. However, some noted that he was easily distracted. The president and owner of the plant said Jones always arrived on time and largely kept to himself.

Jones obtained the later murder weapon illegally. Although its serial number had been filed off, technicians at the ATF managed to restore its digits. They discovered that it was stolen during a burglary on June 8, 2012. After the shooting, investigators found 23 unsent letters written by Jones in his apartment. The letters were addressed to women he saw outside, but never talked to, and female celebrities. He appeared to have an affinity for Latina celebrities, writing to them about their work and his imaginary rap career. Jones would sign the letters in the names of Olusegun Obasanjo, the former President of Nigeria, and Felix Mitchell, a deceased Oakland drug lord. They also found 24 rounds of .357-caliber ammunition and 21 rounds of .38-caliber ammunition.

== See also ==
- List of mass shootings in the United States
- List of shootings in California
