= Mizpah Hotel fire =

2006 fire in Reno, Nevada

Coordinates: 39.5278°N 119.8104°W

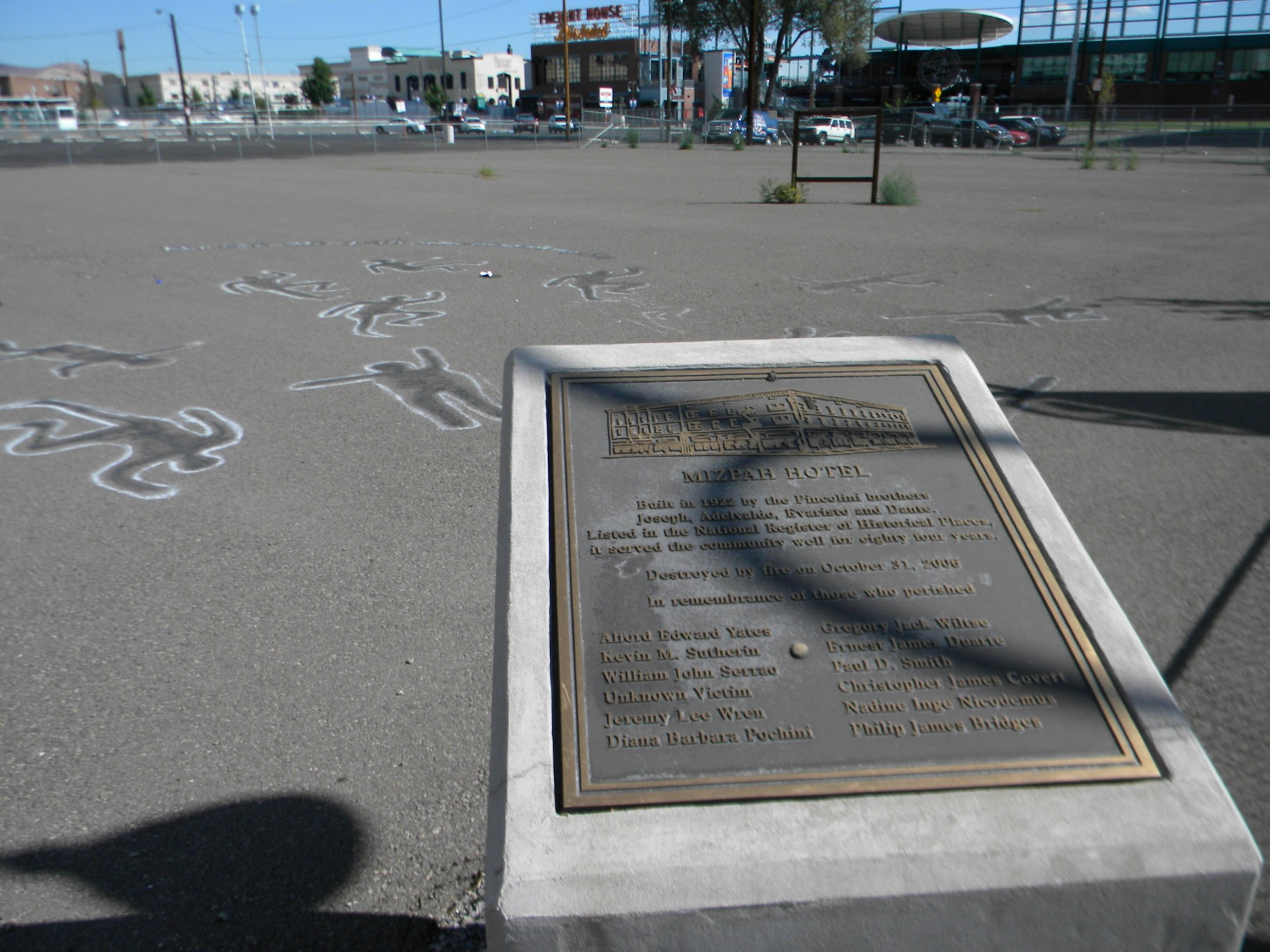
- Location: Reno, Nevada
- Date: October 31, 2006
- Attack type: Arson, mass murder
- Deaths: 12
- Injuries: 32
- Perpetrator: Valerie Moore

The Mizpah Hotel Fire was an arson attack took place at the Mizpah Hotel in Reno, Nevada on October 31, 2006 that killed twelve people. A woman was arrested for starting the fire, and sentenced to life imprisonment.

== Fire ==
The fire started at 10:00 PM, when the perpetrator, Valerie Moore, put a mattress against a door after having a quarrel with a male resident, and then set it up in flames. The death toll rose to nine by November 3. Two more bodies were located by November 6, bringing the death toll to eleven. The final body was recovered by November 9.

== Perpetrator ==
The perpetrator was identified as 47-year-old Valerie Moore, a casino cook, who was immediately arrested and charged with arson and multiple counts of first-degree murder. She was described as a pleasant woman and a good tenant but was also described as having a drinking problem. Moore had a criminal history in which she was convicted of second-degree murder in 1987 for the murder of Kathleen Kennedy, a woman whom she beat to death after arguing over money and for rejecting her sexual advances. Moore was released on parole in 2005 after spending 17 years in prison.

On January 19, 2007, Moore pled guilty. On March 17, 2007, she was sentenced to twelve life terms without parole.
