= Consulate General of China, San Francisco =

Consulate General of China in San Francisco Chinese: 中国驻旧金山总领事馆
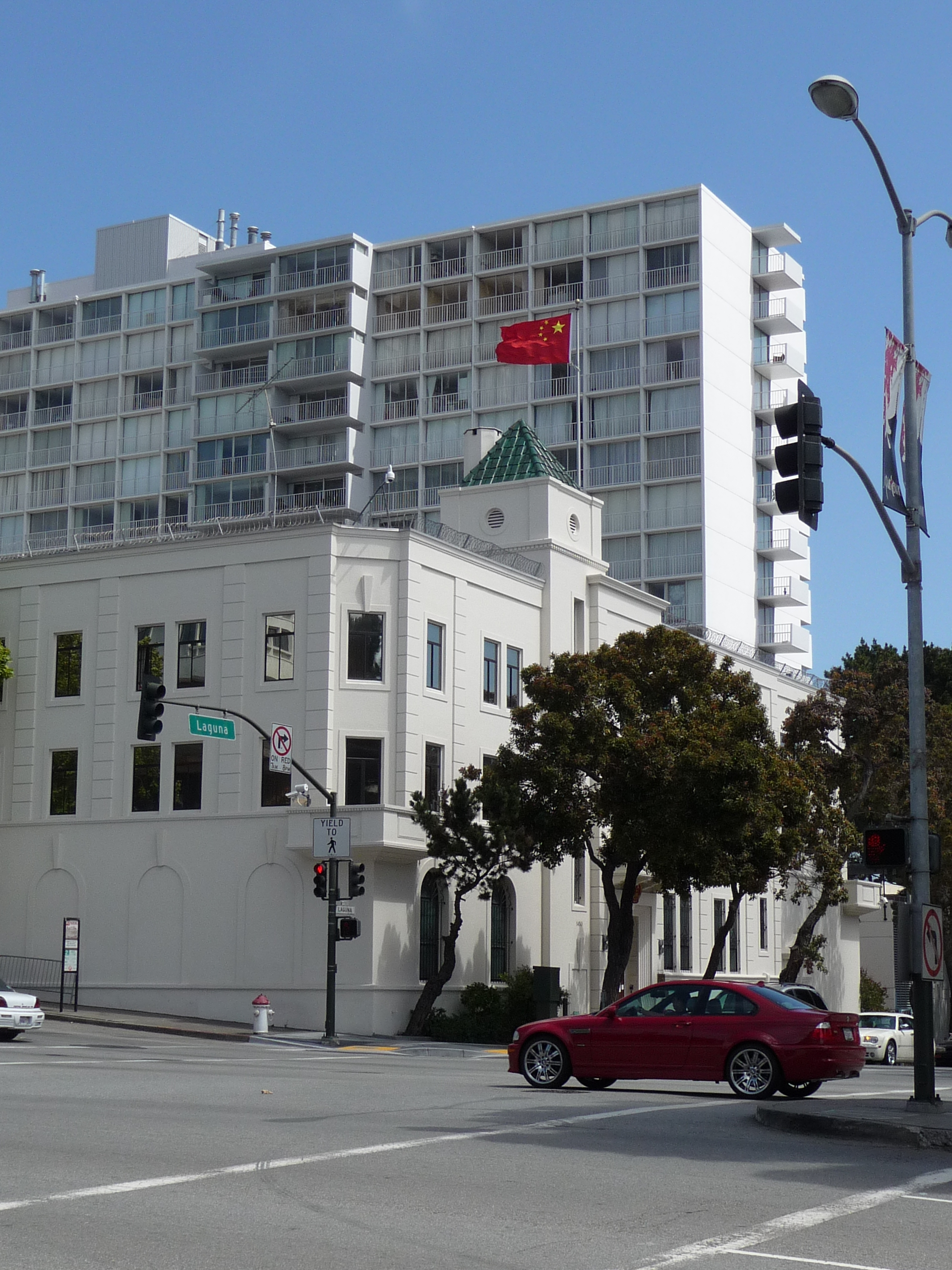
- Location: San Francisco, CA, US (United States)
- Address: 1450 Laguna St., San Francisco, CA
- Coordinates: 37°47′05″N 122°25′40″W
- Ambassador: Jianmin Zhang
- Website: sanfrancisco.china-consulate.gov.cn/chn/

The Consulate General of China in San Francisco (Chinese: 中国驻旧金山总领事馆) is a diplomatic mission of the People's Republic of China to the United States of America in the city of San Francisco. The consulate was opened in August 1979. This consulate was one of two original consulates that China set up, with the other being the now-closed consulate in Houston. The consular district includes most states in the Northwest, including NorCal, Oregon, Washington, Nevada, and Alaska.

The consulate is located at 1450 Laguna St., San Francisco, CA.

== Incidents ==
=== 2008 Beijing Olympics ===
On August 6, 2008, two days before the opening of the Beijing Olympics, a protest group consisting of eight white Americans and two Tibetans came to the consulate to protest against the Chinese government's role in the worsening of Human rights in Tibet. Chinese officials responded by rushing to the roof with metal water pipes and knives to swing them around and attack the demonstrators. The officials also cut the ropes of Tibetans who climbed up the consulate building and held up slogans "Stop the Tibetan Massacre", causing the protesters to be sent to the hospital.

=== Suspected Arson ===
On New Year's Day in 2014, at around 9:30 pm, there was a fire at the consulate, causing serious damage to the main entrance of the building. The incident was a suspected act of arson.

=== Extradition of suspected spy ===
On July 24, 2020, the consulate handed over a Chinese woman, Tang Juan, over to American authorities. She was suspected of concealing her identity as a PLA member, and was wanted by the FBI for visa fraud.

=== Intrusion by a driver ===
Video of 911 call and police bodycam footage of the 2023 incident

On October 9, 2023, a 31-year-old Chinese national, Zhanyuan Yang, drove a car and broke into the main hall of the consulate building. Yang, who shouted, "Where is the CCP?" was then shot by police who arrived at the scene. Afterwards, the spokesperson of the Consulate General updated that the situation was under control of the police. The spokesperson then also demanded answers from the Americans, including an investigation into the facts of the incident, and the implementation of punishment in accordance with the law. The spokesperson further urged the Americans to ensure the safety of the personnel and building of the consulate, in accordance with the Vienna Convention on Consular Relations and Sino-American Consular Treaty. The SFPD later pronounced the suspect dead at a hospital.

== See also ==
- China–US relations
- Embassy of China, Washington, D.C.
- List of diplomatic missions of China
- List of diplomatic missions in the United States
