= Covina massacre =

2008 mass shooting and arson in California, U.S.

Coordinates: 34°04′49.4″N 117°52′02.5″W

- Location: Covina, California, U.S.
- Date: December 24, 2008; 17 years ago c. 11:30 p.m. (PST; UTC−08:00)
- Target: Ex-wife and her family
- Attack type: Mass shooting; mass murder; murder-suicide; arson; ex-uxoricide
- Weapons: Four 9mm SIG Sauer semi-automatic handguns; Improvised flamethrower
- Deaths: 10 (including the perpetrator)
- Injuries: 3 (2 from gunfire)
- Perpetrator: Bruce Jeffrey Pardo
- Motive: Contentious divorce

On December 24, 2008, a mass shooting and arson attack took place in Covina, California, United States. Nine members of the Ortega-Ortiz family were killed before the perpetrator, 45-year-old Bruce Pardo, fled the scene, dying of a self-inflicted gunshot wound at his brother's residence the following morning.

The massacre was subject to national coverage because Pardo had worn a Santa suit to gain access to the property and hide his weapons. Police speculated that Pardo's divorce, which had been finalized only one week before the killings, was a factor in why Pardo had decided to kill his ex-wife and her relatives.

== Killings ==
At approximately 11:30 p.m. on Christmas Eve, Pardo, wearing a Santa suit, arrived at his former in-law's house in a rental car. He had with him multiple 9mm SIG Sauer handguns and a large gift-wrapped package containing a rolling air compressor converted to spray racing fuel. When he knocked on the door and his 8-year-old niece answered, Pardo pulled out the handguns and opened fire, wounding her. He then fired indiscriminately at fleeing party-goers.

After opening fire with the handguns, Pardo unwrapped the package containing the compressor and sprayed fuel around the interior of the home. Police believe the fire was intended to be ignited with a flare but when the fuel contacted an open flame in the house there was an explosion. Between the gunfire and the flames, a total of nine family members were killed and three were injured. One of the survivors made it to a neighbor's house, where she called police and identified Pardo as the likely suspect.

Pardo had apparently planned a detailed escape. He had rented multiple vehicles and parked one near the house of his ex-wife's divorce attorney, full of supplies and maps of the Southwest and Mexico. Police speculated the attorney might have also been a target. Pardo had made plans to visit a friend in Iowa and had purchased a plane ticket from Los Angeles to Moline, Illinois, for December 25. He was also carrying cash strapped to his body.

The explosion and fire had left Pardo with third-degree burns on his arms and legs, partially melting the fabric of the Santa suit into his skin. After setting the home on fire, Pardo changed out of the Santa suit and drove to his brother's house in Sylmar, where he was found dead from a self-inflicted gunshot wound to the mouth. His brother was not present in the home at the time of Pardo's death. The medical examiners found that cocaine was in his system at the time of the attack and his death.

Pardo's rental car, parked one block from his brother's house, contained remnants of his Santa suit, booby-trapped so that moving the suit would trigger a fire and set off 200 rounds of ammunition. At Pardo's house in Montrose, police had recovered five empty boxes for semiautomatic handguns, two shotguns and a container for high-octane fuel tank gasoline. They also found what was described as a "virtual bomb-making factory" in his home.

=== Victims ===
In addition to three injured victims, the nine deceased victims were: Sylvia Ortega Pardo, age 43, ex-wife of Bruce Pardo; Alicia Sotomayor Ortega, age 70, mother-in-law; Joseph S. Ortega, age 79, father-in-law; Charles Ortega, age 50, brother-in-law; Cheri Lynn Ortega, age 45, sister-in-law; James Ortega, age 52, brother-in-law; Teresa Ortega, age 52, sister-in-law; Alicia Ortega Ortiz, age 46, sister-in-law; Michael Andre Ortiz, age 17, nephew.

== Perpetrator ==
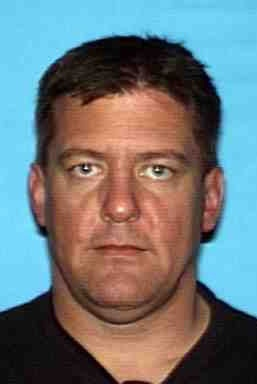
Bruce Jeffrey Pardo

Bruce Jeffrey Pardo (March 23, 1963 – December 25, 2008) lived in San Fernando Valley and was a graduate of John H. Francis Polytechnic High School in Sun Valley, Los Angeles, and California State University, Northridge. He had worked at the Jet Propulsion Laboratory in La Cañada Flintridge. In 2004, he met Sylvia Ortega.

=== Motivation ===
Police speculate that Pardo may have been motivated to murder by a desire to avoid the financial consequences of his divorce. The couple wed in January 2006, and their marriage fell apart within the first year because Pardo refused to open a joint bank account with Sylvia; he also expected his wife to use her own finances to take care of her own three children. There is some speculation that the divorce may have also been caused by Pardo concealing a child from a previous relationship for which Pardo did not pay child or spousal support.

In June 2008, a divorce court ordered Pardo to pay $1,785 a month in spousal support. During the divorce proceedings, Pardo confided to a friend his wife was "taking him to the cleaners." In July, Pardo, who had no criminal record or history of violence, was fired from his job as an electrical engineer at ITT Corporation Electronic Systems Radar Systems for billing false hours. The divorce court suspended the support payments due to financial hardship. However, as part of the divorce settlement, Pardo was required to pay his ex-wife $10,000, and she was permitted to keep her wedding ring and the family dog. Pardo complained to the court that Sylvia was living with her parents, not paying rent, and had spent lavishly on a luxury car, gambling trips to Las Vegas, meals at expensive restaurants, massages, and golf lessons. Pardo and Sylvia finalized their divorce a week prior to the attack.

== Depiction in media ==
- Poly Styrene, the lead singer of X-Ray Spex, recorded a song inspired by the shooting in 2010 called "Black Christmas". The music video contains references to the shooting.
- Inspired the basis for the remake of Silent Night, Deadly Night released in 2012. Silent_Night_(2012_film)

== See also ==
- List of massacres in the United States
- List of homicides in California
