= Rancho Tehama, California =

- Unincorporated Community; Census Designated Place
- Location in Tehama County and the state of California

- Location in the United States Rancho Tehama, California (California)
- Coordinates: 40°0′29″N 122°25′33″W
- Country: United States
- State: California
- County: Tehama

Area
  - Total: 11.764 sq mi (30.468 km^{2})
  - Land: 11.687 sq mi (30.268 km^{2})
  - Water: 0.077 sq mi (0.200 km^{2}) 0.66%
- Elevation: 525 ft (160 m)

Population (2020)
  - Total: 1,572
  - Density: 134.5/sq mi (51.94/km^{2})
- Time zone: UTC-8 (Pacific (PST))
  - Summer (DST): UTC-7 (PDT)
- ZIP codes: 96021, 96080
- Area code: 530
- FIPS code: 06-59604
- GNIS ID: 2413663
- Website: Official website

Rancho Tehama, also known as the Rancho Tehama Reserve, is an unincorporated community in Tehama County, California, United States. As of the 2020 census, the population of the community and nearby areas was 1,572. The lightly populated rural, remote community has large lots where some residents farm olives, walnuts and almonds.

== History ==
=== 2017 shooting spree ===
During a shooting spree on November 13–14, five people were killed and eighteen others were injured at eight separate crime scenes, including an elementary school. Ten people suffered bullet wounds and eight were cut by flying glass caused by the gunfire. The gunman, Kevin Janson Neal, died by suicide after a Corning police officer rammed and stopped his stolen vehicle.

== Geography ==
According to the United States Census Bureau, the CDP has a total area of 11.8 square miles (31 square kilometres), of which 11.7 square miles (30 km^{2}) is land and 0.1 square miles (0.26 km^{2}) (0.66%) is water. The census definition of the area may not precisely correspond to local understanding of the area with the same name.

Rancho Tehama Airport, National Geographic Names Database feature ID 1653862, is located at 40°00′57″N 122°23′23″W in the same vicinity as other references to the community.

== Demographics ==
Historical population
| Census | Pop. | Note | %± |
|---|---|---|---|
| 2000 | 1,406 | | — |
| 2010 | 1,485 | | 5.6% |
| 2020 | 1,572 | | 5.9% |
U.S. Decennial Census; 1860–1870 1880-1890; 1900 1910 1920; 1930 1940 1950; 1960 1970 1980; 1990 2000 2010

For statistical purposes, the United States Census Bureau has defined Rancho Tehama Reserve as a census-designated place (CDP), which includes population from the surrounding area. Rancho Tehama Reserve first appeared as a census designated place in the 2000 U.S. census.

=== 2020 ===
The 2020 United States census reported that Rancho Tehama Reserve had a population of 1,572. The population density was 134.5 inhabitants per square mile (51.9/km^{2}). The racial makeup of Rancho Tehama Reserve was 1,007 (64.1%) White, 14 (0.9%) African American, 48 (3.1%) Native American, 84 (5.3%) Asian, 8 (0.5%) Pacific Islander, 204 (13.0%) from other races, and 207 (13.2%) from two or more races. Hispanic or Latino of any race were 413 persons (26.3%).

The whole population lived in households. There were 629 households, out of which 150 (23.8%) had children under the age of 18 living in them, 267 (42.4%) were married-couple households, 49 (7.8%) were cohabiting couple households, 129 (20.5%) had a female householder with no partner present, and 184 (29.3%) had a male householder with no partner present. 182 households (28.9%) were one person, and 95 (15.1%) were one person aged 65 or older. The average household size was 2.5. There were 392 families (62.3% of all households).

The age distribution was 316 people (20.1%) under the age of 18, 85 people (5.4%) aged 18 to 24, 376 people (23.9%) aged 25 to 44, 450 people (28.6%) aged 45 to 64, and 345 people (21.9%) who were 65 years of age or older. The median age was 45.9 years. For every 100 females, there were 110.2 males.

There were 744 housing units at an average density of 63.7 units per square mile (24.6 units/km^{2}), of which 629 (84.5%) were occupied. Of these, 516 (82.0%) were owner-occupied, and 113 (18.0%) were occupied by renters.

In 2023, the US Census Bureau estimated that the median household income was $43,750, and the per capita income was $22,214. About 29.3% of families and 30.3% of the population were below the poverty line.

== Government ==
In the California State Legislature, Rancho Tehama is in the 1st senatorial district, represented by Republican Megan Dahle, and in the 3rd Assembly district, represented by Vacant.

In the United States House of Representatives, Rancho Tehama is in California's 1st congressional district, represented by Republican James Gallagher.
