= 2023 Goshen shooting =

Mass shooting in California, U.S.

- Location: Goshen, California, U.S.
- Date: January 16, 2023; 3 years ago c. 3:30 a.m. (PST, UTC-8)
- Attack type: Mass shooting, mass murder
- Weapons: Bersa .380 semi-automatic pistol, unspecified rifle
- Deaths: 6
- Injuries: 0
- Motive: Gang violence
- Accused: Noah David Beard and Angel Uriarte

On January 16, 2023, six people, including a ten-month-old baby, were killed execution-style in a house in Goshen, California, in the United States. Three others survived the shooting uninjured.

== Background ==
A week prior to the shooting, a search warrant was executed at the home, and according to the Tulare County Sheriff, deputies found drugs, ammunition and weapons. Eladio Parraz was arrested and later bailed as a result.

== Shooting ==
The shooting happened just before 3:40 a. m. January 16, 2023 in Goshen, California. Six people died from gunshot wounds: Rosa Parraz, 72; Eladio Parraz Jr., 52; Jennifer Analla, 50; Marcos Parraz, 19; Alissa Parraz, 16 and her son 10-month-old Nycholas Parraz. Deputies arrived seven minutes after the first 911 call to find three survivors—the caller and two others—Alissa and her baby Nycholas dead outside, and four more dead in the house. Deputies say that there were at least two shooters involved.

Surveillance footage shows Alissa Parraz attempting to save her baby by placing him over a fence when they were both shot.

Five of the six victims were shot in the head, the other was shot in the torso and leg.

== Survivors ==
There were three survivors of the shooting. One of them was the 911 caller. Upon hearing gunshots from down the hallway, the caller quickly laid down on their back, propped their feet against the door, and played dead. The caller said that the shooter did rattle the door knob but quickly moved on. There were two other survivors who were hiding in a trailer near where one of the victims was shot.

== Search ==
On January 20, 2023, three search warrants were issued in the Goshen area for known gang members. At the same time deputies searched eight prison cells and sixteen inmates in five different prisons affiliated with the same gang. Initially, there was a $10,000 reward offered by the Sheriff's Department to gather information on a suspect. The reward was subsequently increased to $25,000. The officers identified eight suspects, issued eighteen arrest warrants and retrieved six firearms. By the end of the search two members from a rival gang of the Parrazes were arrested.

Noah Beard and Angel Uriarte were arrested on February 3, 2023, and charged for the murders. Both pleaded not guilty and they are being held without bail. If convicted, they would face life in prison without possibility of parole, or the death penalty. Uriarte also faces federal charges of assault on a federal officer involving a weapon, discharging a firearm during a violent crime, and being a felon in possession of a firearm, because of his shootout with ATF agents as they were trying to arrest him.

== Aftermath ==
In the aftermath of the shooting, Nycholas Parraz's father, Shayne Maupin, 18, filed a lawsuit suing four of the Tulare County Child Welfare Services members for their role in placing Nycholas in the Goshen house. Right after birth Nycholas was placed into the care of Child Welfare Service due to both of his parents being minors. Three days prior to the shooting Child Services placed Nycholas into his mother's custody. Maupin's lawsuit claims that members of the Tulare County Child Welfare Services didn't take proper precaution by knowingly placing Nycholas Parraz in a household where gang members lived and that was at high risk of gang violence. The lawsuit also details how seven other infants died in the care of the Tulare County Child Welfare Services. Shayne also calls out seven members of the Tulare County Sheriff Office for their role in not protecting Nycholas. Two weeks prior to the shooting, officers issued a warrant to search the household. They found methamphetamine, drug paraphernalia and firearms inside the home. The lawsuit claims that there was no effort on the Sheriff's Office to protect Alissa or Nycholas who were both minors living in the household.
