= Goshen, California =

Goshen
- Unincorporated Community; Census Designated Place
- Location in Tulare County and the state of California

- Location in the United States
- Coordinates: 36°20′51″N 119°25′12″W
- Country: United States
- State: California
- County: Tulare

Area
  - Total: 2.816 sq mi (7.293 km^{2})
  - Land: 2.816 sq mi (7.293 km^{2})
  - Water: 0 sq mi (0 km^{2}) 0%
- Elevation: 285 ft (87 m)

Population (2020)
  - Total: 4,968
  - Density: 1,764/sq mi (681.2/km^{2})
- Time zone: UTC-8 (Pacific)
  - Summer (DST): UTC-7 (PDT)
- ZIP code: 93227
- Area code: 559
- FIPS code: 06-30476
- GNIS feature ID: 1660689

Goshen is a census-designated place (CDP) near Visalia, in Tulare County, California, United States. The population was at 4,968 in the 2020 census, up from the 3,006 in the 2010 census. Until the twentieth century, Goshen was an island in a marsh at the edge of Tulare Lake, formerly the largest freshwater lake west of the Great Lakes until drained.

== History ==
In 1858, the Butterfield Overland Mail passed through the area, stopping at Head of Cross Creek Station, 4 miles (6.4 km) northwest of Goshen, at the head of the place where Cross Creek divided into two branches for a time, making it easier to cross them separately. It was 12 miles (19 km) west of the next stop at Visalia, and 15 miles (24 km) southeast of the next stop in the other direction, Whitmore's Ferry.

Goshen was founded in the 1870s. The Central Pacific Railroad was expanding which continued with a branch line from Goshen to Visalia in 1874. In the early 1890s, Chris Evans and John Sontag robbed a Southern Pacific Railroad train at Goshen.

== Geography ==
According to the United States Census Bureau, the CDP has a total area of 2.8 square miles (7.3 km^{2}), all land.

== Demographics ==
Historical population
Census	Pop.	Note	%±
2000	2,394		—
2010	3,006		25.6%
2020	4,968		65.3%
U.S. Decennial Census; 1860–1870 1880-1890; 1900 1910 1920; 1930 1940 1950; 1960 1970 1980; 1990 2000 2010

Goshen first appeared as a census designated place in the 2000 U.S. census.

=== 2020 census ===
As of the 2020 census, Goshen had a population of 4,968. The population density was 1,764.2 inhabitants per square mile (681.2/km^{2}). The age distribution was 37.8% under the age of 18, 8.6% aged 18 to 24, 29.7% aged 25 to 44, 16.8% aged 45 to 64, and 7.0% who were 65 years of age or older. The median age was 27.3 years. For every 100 females, there were 99.7 males, and for every 100 females age 18 and over there were 95.3 males. 99.2% of residents lived in urban areas, while 0.8% lived in rural areas.

The whole population lived in households. There were 1,262 households, out of which 59.0% included children under the age of 18, 48.3% were married-couple households, 10.3% were cohabiting couple households, 26.0% had a female householder with no spouse or partner present, and 15.5% had a male householder with no spouse or partner present. 9.8% of households were one person, and 3.0% were one person aged 65 or older. The average household size was 3.94. There were 1,082 families (85.7% of all households).

There were 1,312 housing units at an average density of 465.9 units per square mile (179.9 units/km^{2}), of which 3.8% were vacant and 1,262 (96.2%) were occupied. Of occupied units, 59.2% were owner-occupied, and 40.8% were occupied by renters. The homeowner vacancy rate was 0.0%, and the rental vacancy rate was 1.7%.

Racial composition as of the 2020 census
Race	Number	Percent
White	1,053	21.2%
Black or African American	58	1.2%
American Indian and Alaska Native	87	1.8%
Asian	492	9.9%
Native Hawaiian and Other Pacific Islander	3	0.1%
Some other race	2,117	42.6%
Two or more races	1,158	23.3%
Hispanic or Latino (of any race)	3,862	77.7%

=== Income and poverty ===
In 2023, the US Census Bureau estimated that the median household income in 2023 was $72,813, and the per capita income was $21,383. About 17.5% of families and 19.8% of the population were below the poverty line.

=== 2010 census ===
The 2010 United States census reported that Goshen had a population of 3,006. The population density was 1,696.4 inhabitants per square mile (655.0/km^{2}). The racial makeup of Goshen was 1,186 (39.5%) White, 76 (2.5%) African American, 90 (3.0%) Native American, 11 (0.4%) Asian, 1 (0.0%) Pacific Islander, 1,496 (49.8%) from other races, and 146 (4.9%) from two or more races. Hispanic or Latino of any race were 2,482 persons (82.6%).

The Census reported that 3,006 people (100% of the population) lived in households, 0 (0%) lived in non-institutionalized group quarters, and 0 (0%) were institutionalized.

There were 773 households, out of which 441 (57.1%) had children under the age of 18 living in them, 384 (49.7%) were opposite-sex married couples living together, 156 (20.2%) had a female householder with no husband present, 93 (12.0%) had a male householder with no wife present. There were 82 (10.6%) unmarried opposite-sex partnerships, and 8 (1.0%) same-sex married couples or partnerships. 101 households (13.1%) were made up of individuals, and 33 (4.3%) had someone living alone who was 65 years of age or older. The average household size was 3.89. There were 633 families (81.9% of all households); the average family size was 4.19.

The population was spread out, with 1,074 people (35.7%) under the age of 18, 328 people (10.9%) aged 18 to 24, 843 people (28.0%) aged 25 to 44, 557 people (18.5%) aged 45 to 64, and 204 people (6.8%) who were 65 years of age or older. The median age was 27.1 years. For every 100 females, there were 107.3 males. For every 100 females age 18 and over, there were 106.0 males.

There were 840 housing units at an average density of 474.0 per square mile (183.0/km^{2}), of which 404 (52.3%) were owner-occupied, and 369 (47.7%) were occupied by renters. The homeowner vacancy rate was 2.4%; the rental vacancy rate was 10.0%. 1,526 people (50.8% of the population) lived in owner-occupied housing units and 1,480 people (49.2%) lived in rental housing units.

== Government ==
In the California State Legislature, Goshen is in the 12th senatorial district, represented by Republican Shannon Grove, and in the 32nd Assembly district, represented by Republican Stan Ellis.

In the United States House of Representatives, Goshen is in California's 21st congressional district, represented by Democrat Jim Costa.

== Education ==
Goshen is served by the Visalia Unified School District.
