= List of school stabbings in the United States =

This chronological list of notable school stabbings in the United States includes school stabbings in the United States that occurred at K–12 public and private schools, as well as at colleges and universities, and on school buses. Excluded from this list are the following:

1. Murder–suicides by rejected suitors or estranged spouses.
2. Suicides or suicide attempts involving only one person.
3. Stabbings by school staff, where the only victims are other employees that are covered at workplace killings.

== List ==
Date	Location	Deaths	Injuries	Total	Description
1966
November 12, 1966	Tempe, Arizona	1	0	1	As part of the 1966 Rose-Mar College of Beauty shooting, a 3-year-old child who initially survived her gunshot wounds was fatally stabbed by Robert Benjamin Smith. He was later sentenced to life imprisonment for the attack.
1993
April 12, 1993	Dartmouth, Massachusetts	1	0	1	At Dartmouth High School, three students rushed and stabbed 16 -year-old Jason Robinson to death.
1994
February 1, 1994	Simi Valley, California	1	0	1	13-year-old Philip Hernandez stabbed a 14-year-old student to death at Valley View Junior High School, for which he was sentenced to 4 years' imprisonment.
2001
February 2. 2001	Red Lion, Pennsylvania	0	14	14	2001 Red Lion machete attack: 55-year-old William Michael Stankewicz stabbed and injured 11 people at North Hopewell-Winterstown Elementary School. He was later sentenced to 264 years' imprisonment.
May 7, 2001	Anchorage, Alaska	0	5 (Note: Including the suspect or perpetrator.)	5	Four students were stabbed at Mountain View Elementary School at around 8:10 a.m. The suspect, who was identified as 33-year-old Jason Pritchard, was injured by police gunfire and subsequently arrested.
December 5, 2001	Springfield, Massachusetts	1	0	1	At Springfield High School, 17-year-old Corey Ramos stabbed counselor Reverend Theodore Brown to death, for which he was sentenced to life imprisonment.
2004
February 3, 2004	Palmetto Bay, Florida	1	0	1	14-year-old Michael Hernandez stabbed 14-year-old Jaime Rodrigo Gough to death at Southwood Middle School. He was sentenced to life imprisonment.
2006
October 19, 2006	Orlando, Florida	1	0	1	17-year-old Kelvin De La Cruz stabbed 15-year-old Michael Nieves to death at a bus stop on the campus of University High School.
2008
January 8, 2008	West Reading, Pennsylvania	0	3	3	There was a stabbing incident at Antietam Middle-Senior High School where a male student attacked three other students with a knife in a hallway.
2009
January 21, 2009	Blacksburg, Virginia	1	0	1	Murder of Yang Xin: Zhu Haiyang, a graduate student from China, decapitated another graduate student, Yang Xin, at Virginia Tech.
September 15, 2009	Coral Gables, Florida	1	0	1	At Coral Gables Senior High School, 17-year-old Andy Jesus Rodriguez fatally stabs fellow 17-year-old Juan Carlos Rivera during an altercation. He was later sentenced to 40 years' imprisonment.
September 23, 2009	Tyler, Texas	1	0	1	16-year-old Byron Truvia stabbed his high school teacher Todd R. Henry to death at John Tyler High School.
October 16, 2009	Conway, South Carolina	1 (Note: Only the suspect or perpetrator.)	1	2	16-year-old student Trevor Varinecz pulled out a knife and stabbed a police officer at Carolina Forest High School, at which point the officer shot and killed him.
2011
September 30, 2011	South Gate, California	1	2	3	18-year-old Abraham Lopez stabbed his ex-girlfriend Cindi Santana to death and wounded two bystanders at South East High School.
October 24, 2011	Snohomish, Washington	0	2	2	A 15-year-old girl stabbed two classmates with a butcher knife at Snohomish High School.
2012
February 29, 2012	Chicago, Illinois	1	1	2	A student stabbed two fellow students, one fatally, at AMIKids Infinity Chicago.
November 30, 2012	Casper, Wyoming	3	0	3	Casper College murders: Christopher Krumm, son of Casper College faculty member James Krumm, shot his father to death using a compound bow before fatally stabbing him to death and immediately committing suicide with a knife. It was later revealed he had previously murdered his father's girlfriend, Heidi Arnold, also a teacher at said college, by stabbing her to death at their residence.
2013
April 9, 2013	Cypress, Texas	0	14	14	2013 Lone Star College stabbing: Dylan Quick, a 20-year-old student at the school, stabbed fourteen people, mostly in the neck and head, with a scalpel and X-Acto knife before being subdued. He was later sentenced to 48 years' imprisonment.
July 10, 2013	Honolulu, Hawaii	0	1	1	Two men stabbed a homeless man on President William McKinley High School grounds.
September 4, 2013	Spring, Texas	1	3	4	Spring High School stabbing: One student was killed and three others were wounded in a stabbing attack at Spring High School in Spring, Texas, United States. A 17-year-old student, identified as Luis Alonzo Alfaro, was arrested and charged with the murder. In September 2014, Alfaro was convicted of manslaughter and sentenced to 20 years in prison.
2014
April 9, 2014	Murrysville, Pennsylvania	0	24 (Note: 2 indirectly.)	24	Franklin Regional High School stabbing: 16-year-old student Alexander Hribal stabbed and injured 21 people on campus, four of them critically. All survived, and Hribal was later sentenced to 60 years' imprisonment.
April 28, 2014	Hartford, Connecticut	1	0	1	A 16-year-old student at Jonathan Law High School fatally stabbed a girl after she refused his invitation for prom.
May 23, 2014	Isla Vista, California	3	0	3	As part of the 2014 Isla Vista killings, two roommates and one of their friends were fatally stabbed by Elliot Rodger on an on-campus residence at Santa Barbara City College. Rodger later killed three more people and injured another 14 before committing suicide.
2015
February 19, 2015	Malden, Massachusetts	1	2	3	A 30-year-old man stabbed two teachers at Salter School before fleeing to a nearby neighborhood and was shot by police.
November 4, 2015	Merced, California	1	4	5	University of California, Merced stabbing attack: 18-year-old student Faisal Mohammad stabbed and injured four people with a hunting knife on the campus of the University of California, Merced. He was subsequently shot and killed. He was found to have been inspired by Islamic State-sponsored terrorism.
2016
October 7, 2016	Colorado Springs, Colorado	0	1	1	A sixth-grade student was stabbed numerous times with a pencil by a classmate.
November 15, 2016	Orem, Utah	0	6	6	A 16-year-old attacked students at random with knives and a martial arts stick at Mountain View High School before being tasered and attempting to commit suicide by stabbing.
November 28, 2016	Columbus, Ohio	1	13	14	2016 Ohio State University attack: A terrorist vehicle-ramming and stabbing attack occurred at Ohio State University's Watts Hall. The attacker, Somali refugee Abdul Razak Ali Artan, was shot and killed by the first responding OSU police officer, and 13 people were hospitalized for injuries. He was ultimately found to have been motivated by Islamist terrorism and terrorist propaganda.
2017
March 21, 2017	Temple Hills, Maryland	0	1	1	18-year-old Nathaniel Coates stabbed a student at Crossland High School during an altercation.
May 1, 2017	Austin, Texas	1	3	4	21-year-old Kendrex White, a student at the University of Texas at Austin, stabbed four other students on campus, killing a 19-year-old man.
September 28, 2017	The Bronx, New York	1	1	2	An 18-year-old student stabbed two students, killing one of them, at Urban Assembly School for Wildlife Conservation with a three-inch switchblade.
2019
December 3, 2019	Oshkosh, Wisconsin	0	2	2	A 16-year-old student at Oshkosh West High School armed with a barbecue fork stabbed school resource officer Mike Wissink, who proceeded to shoot the attacker and take him into custody.
2020
January 7, 2020	Rockport, Massachusetts	0	1	1	A 13-year-old student stabbed a female classmate at Rockport Middle School.
2021
November 17, 2021	Springfield, Illinois	1	1	2	A 15-year-old non-student stabbed two students at Lanphier High School as school let out, killing one of them.
2022
April 18, 2022	Stockton, California	1	0	1	A 52-year-old man intruded on the campus of Stagg High School and stabbed a 15-year-old student to death.
May 25, 2022	Naperville, Illinois	0	1	1	A 16-year-old Neuqua Valley High School student stabbed another student multiple times with a pocketknife in a bathroom.
September 1, 2022	Jacksonville, North Carolina	1	2 (Note: 1 indirectly.)	3	Two students were stabbed, one fatally, during an altercation at Northside High School. A teacher was injured by unrelated causes.
2023
August 31, 2023	Clearwater, Florida	0	2	2	A 14-year-old Countryside High School student randomly stabbed two students in a hallway.
November 1, 2023	Los Angeles, California	0	5	5	Van Nuys High School stabbing: A series of stabbings took place within the campus of Van Nuys High School located in the Los Angeles neighborhood of Van Nuys. Five students were injured, along with three unidentified perpetrators being detained.
November 27, 2023	Raleigh, North Carolina	1	1	2	A 15-year-old student at Southeast Raleigh Magnet High School was killed and another injured when a 14-year-old stabbed people during a fight.
2024
February 12, 2024	Manchester, New Hampshire	0	1	1	Two male students got into an argument at Manchester Memorial High School. One student stabbed the other before he was arrested.
October 29, 2024	Manor, Texas	1	0	1	An 18-year-old student stabbed another 18-year-old student, Darrin Loving, to death in a bathroom at Manor Senior High School. The suspect was later charged with first-degree murder.
November 14, 2024	Yonkers, New York	0	1	1	A 14-year-old student at Gorton High School repeatedly stabbed a 17-year-old senior. The victim is in stable condition, and the attacker was arrested.
November 23, 2024	Philadelphia, Pennsylvania	0	2	2	At Castor Gardens Middle School, an 11-year-old student stabbed two teachers with a kitchen knife, both of whom received minor injuries.
2025
April 2, 2025	Frisco, Texas	1	0	1	Killing of Austin Metcalf: 17-year-old Memorial High School student Austin Metcalf was stabbed to death by a non-student at the school stadium during a track meet.
April 8, 2025	Fort Lee, New Jersey	0	1	1	A 16-year-old was charged with stabbing a classmate as retaliation for a prank at Fort Lee High School.
April 23, 2025	Fairfax County, Virginia	0	3	3	A 15-year-old stabbed another student during a fight with three people at West Potomac High School. Two others, including the stabber, were injured during the fight.
May 8, 2025	Santa Ana, California	1	2	3	A gang-related stabbing perpetrated by two students took place at Santa Ana High School. The suspects fled the scene.
August 19, 2025	Phoenix, Arizona	1	1	2	A male freshman stabbed another freshman with a pair of scissors during a fight in a classroom at Maryvale High School, critically injuring him. Both students were transported to hospital with injuries, where the victim later died.
September 24, 2025	Pittsburgh, Pennsylvania	0	3	3	A 16-year-old student stabbed three fellow students during a targeted altercation at Carrick High School.
October 13, 2025	Torrance, California	0	3	3	A 17-year-old student stabbed three staff members before attempting to set off a bomb at Switzer Learning Center.
November 3, 2025	Knoxville, Tennessee	0	1	1	A 16-year-old student stabbed a 15-year-old student at Halls High School. He was charged with aggravated assault.
November 7, 2025	Inglewood, California	0	1	1	A student stabbed another student in the shoulder using a pocket knife at Morningside High School.
November 29, 2025	Ann Arbor, Michigan	0	1	1	A student was stabbed at the parking lot of Pioneer High School. The perpetrator was arrested at the scene.
2026
January 9, 2026	Zion, Illinois	0	1	1	A 17-year-old was stabbed by another student at Zion-Benton Township High School.
March 24, 2026	De Funiak Springs, Florida	0	3	3	Two students and an adult were injured at Walton Middle School.
April 30, 2026	Tacoma, Washington	0	6	6	A mass stabbing took place at Henry Foss High School. Four of the victims were in critical condition. The attacker also sustained minor injuries.
August 13, 2026	Jonesville, Virginia	0	1	1	A 12-year-old boy stabbed a teacher in Jonesville Middle School. The boy was quickly tackled by seventh graders.
August 28, 2026	El Paso, Texas	0	3	3	A suspect stabbed two 14-year-old boys and a 14-year-old girl in Americas High School. It's unknown if the suspect also attended the high school.
November 12, 2026	Warrenton, Missouri	0	3	3	Two students and a teacher were injured in a stabbing incident at Black Hawk Middle School with a 4- to 5-inch blade. A student suspect was arrested within minutes of the incident.

== See also ==
- List of attacks related to secondary schools
- Lists of school shootings in the United States
