= Lists of school-related attacks =

Lists of attacks (Note: A narrow definition of "attacks" is used for this list so as to exclude warfare, public attacks (as in political protests), accidental shootings, and suicides and murder-suicides by rejected spouses or suitors that have occurred on school property or related primarily to school issues or events.) on schools include:

== List of school attacks by type of institution ==
There are six lists in this category. Among them are:

- List of attacks related to primary schools
- List of attacks related to secondary schools (before 2000)
- List of attacks related to secondary schools (2000s)
- List of attacks related to secondary schools (2010s)
- List of attacks related to secondary schools (2020s)
- List of attacks related to post-secondary schools

== List of school attacks by countries ==
There are twenty lists in this category. Among them are:

Lists of school attacks in Asian countries:

- List of school attacks in China
- List of school attacks in the Philippines
- List of school attacks in Russia
- List of school attacks in Thailand
- List of school attacks in Turkey

List of school attacks in European countries:

- List of school attacks in Finland
- List of school attacks in Germany
- List of school attacks in the Netherlands
- List of school attacks in Poland
- List of school attacks in Russia
- List of school attacks in Sweden
- List of school attacks in Turkey
- List of school attacks in the United Kingdom

Lists of school attacks in North American countries:

- List of school shootings in Canada
- List of school attacks in Mexico
- Lists of school shootings in the United States
- List of school stabbings in the United States

Lists of school attacks in South American countries:

- List of school attacks in Argentina
- List of school attacks in Brazil
- List of school attacks in Chile

List of school attacks in Oceania countries:

- List of school shootings in Australia
- List of school attacks in New Zealand

== Lists of school attacks by continent ==
There are two lists in this category. Among them are:

- List of school shootings in Europe
- List of school shootings in South America

== Others types of school attacks lists ==
There are three lists in this category. Among them are:

- List of unsuccessful attacks related to schools
- List of rampage killers, includes incidents that involved only staff who work at the school
- List of school massacres by death toll

== See also ==
- School bullying
- School shooting
- School violence
