= List of school shootings in the United States (2010s) =

This chronological list of school shootings in the United States in the year 2010s includes school shootings in the United States that occurred at K–12 public and private schools, as well as at colleges and universities, and on school buses. Included in shootings are non-fatal accidental shootings. Excluded from this list are:

1. Incidents that occurred as a result of police actions
2. Murder–suicides by rejected suitors or estranged spouses
3. Suicides or suicide attempts involving only one person.
4. Shootings by school staff, where the only victims are other employees that are covered at workplace killings.

== Number of US school shootings by year with casualties ==
Year	Total number of shootings	Total number dead (including the shooters)	Total number wounded (including the shooters)	Total mass murders (4 or more deaths, not including the shooters)
2010	14	7	12	0
2011	12	10	17	0
2012	12	41	17	2
2013	26	19	37	1
2014	35	15	39	1
2015	22	23	41	1
2016	20	10	28	0
2017	18	19	32	1
2018	43	43	82	2
2019	61	20	80	0
Total	263	207	385	8

== 2010 ==
14 incidents.

Date	Location	Deaths	Injuries	Total	Description
February 5, 2010	Madison, Alabama	1	0	1	14-year-old student, Hammad Memon, killed 14-year-old Todd Brown at Discovery Middle School as classes were changing. The shooting was possibly related to gang activity. In May 2013, Memon pleaded guilty to the murder and was sentenced to thirty years in prison. After Memon is released from prison, he is likely to be deported to his native Pakistan.
February 10, 2010	Knoxville, Tennessee	0	2	2	A fourth-grade teacher at Inskip Elementary School shot the principal and assistant principal, injuring both and paralyzing the principal below the waist. The shooting occurred hours after students had been dismissed due to snow. The shooter fled the scene but was arrested at a highway construction roadblock. He was sentenced to 56 years in prison.
February 12, 2010	Huntsville, Alabama	3	3	6	2010 University of Alabama in Huntsville shooting: During a biology department meeting with approximately twelve people in attendance, 44-year-old professor of biology Amy Bishop stood up and opened fire. After killing three and wounding three others, Bishop was pushed out of the meeting room by the survivors after her gun ran out of ammo. After being arrested without incident by the police outside the science building, Bishop denied that the shooting even happened. In 1986, Bishop shot and killed her brother in Braintree, Massachusetts, in an incident ruled an accident. In 1993, Bishop and her husband were questioned after a pipe bomb threat incident toward her lab supervisor.
February 19, 2010	DeKalb, Illinois	0	1	1	Less than a week after Northern Illinois University solemnly marked the second anniversary of a mass shooting on campus that claimed the lives of five students, the DeKalb school was the scene of further gun violence. 24-year-old NIU student Brian Mulder refused entry to 22-year-old Zachary R. Isaacman when Isaacman tried to follow a female resident into the Stevenson Residence Hall North, where they were living, because Isaacman was not a resident. Moments later, while outside the dorm smoking with a friend, Mulder was shot by Isaacman with a handgun in the leg above the knee. Isaacman tried to flee, but was caught by police within minutes.
February 23, 2010	Littleton, Colorado	0	2	2	At Deer Creek Middle School, 32-year-old Bruco Strong Eagle Eastwood opened fire from a rifle in a parking lot, and wounded two eighth-graders, Reagan Webber and Matt Thieu, before being restrained by 57-year-old Math teacher, David Benke, and held until his arrest. The boy's wounds were critical for the four days following the shooting. In October 2011, Eastwood was found not guilty by reason of insanity.
February 26, 2010	Tacoma, Washington	2 (Note: Including the suspect or perpetrator)	0	2	A teacher was shot and killed by a stalker at Birney Elementary School, who was later killed by police in a shootout.
May 11, 2010	Bladenboro, North Carolina	0	1	1	A West Bladen High School student was shot on campus as students were leaving school for the day. Investigators said the incident started when a fight broke out between two groups of students near the high school's entrance.
September 8, 2010	Detroit, Michigan	0	2	2	Two students were wounded in front of Mumford High School by 17-year-old Steven Jamal Hare. He was tried as an adult and charged with assault with intent to kill. In 2012, Hare was sentenced to 27 years in prison.
September 28, 2010	Austin, Texas	1	0	1	A 19-year-old sophomore student Colton Tooley, wielding an AK-47 and wearing a ski mask, opened fire and then killed himself in a University of Texas library
October 1, 2010	Salinas, California	1	0	1	15-year-old student Jose Daniel Cisneros was killed after being shot several times on an athletic field at Alisal High School while walking to school. Police said that the shooting was gang-related.
October 8, 2010	Carlsbad, California	0	2	2	Kelly Elementary School (Carlsbad) shooting: 41-year-old Brendan O'Rourke climbed over a fence and opened fire with a handgun in a playground of Kelly Elementary School, which had 230 students; two second-grade female students were grazed in the arms before O'Rourke was subdued by a construction worker. He was found guilty of seven counts of attempted murder and was sentenced to 189 years to life in prison.
October 23, 2010	Topeka, Kansas	1	1	2	Two victims went to meet the two suspects on a field just outside of Topeka West High School to purchase cannabis. However, the deal either went bad or they were ambushed, but Samantha Lindsay Hochard and Austin Tabor were both charged in the murder of 20-year-old Matthew C. Mitchell, and the attempted murder of 17-year-old Treshawn Wynee, who was wounded. A total of four suspects were arrested and charged with various offenses.
November 29, 2010	Marinette, Wisconsin	1	0	1	15-year-old Samuel Hengel took 23 students and a teacher hostage inside a classroom of Marinette High School for five hours. He had stormed into the class, firing with a handgun at a movie projector. Police persuaded Hengel to release the hostages. After officers entered the building, Hengel shot himself in the head. He died the next day.
December 6, 2010	Aurora, Colorado	0	1	1	In a gang-related attack outside Aurora Central High School, a 17-year-old girl was paralyzed. She was one of a group of students outside the school. 20-year-old Luis Enrique Guzman-Rincon had fired shots from a car trying to hit gang rivals. Guzman-Ricon was sentenced to thirty-five years in prison.

== 2011 ==
13 incidents.

Date	Location	Deaths	Injuries	Total	Description
January 5, 2011	Omaha, Nebraska	2	2	4	At Millard South High School, 17-year-old student, Robert Butler Jr., killed assistant principal Dr. Vicki Kaspar and wounded principal Curtis Case before opening fire at police in the front office area, causing the school nurse to be wounded by gunshot debris. Butler then drove to a parking lot and shot himself as police cornered him.
February 2, 2011	Placerville, California	1	0	1	Custodian John Leubbers shot principal Sam LaCara at Louisiana Schnell School, as students were present on campus, in classes.
March 25, 2011	Martinsville, Indiana	0	1	1	Michael Phelps, a 15-year-old suspended student, returned to Martinsville West Middle School with a handgun. In the entrance of the school, Phelps shot 15-year-old Chance Jackson twice in the abdomen, critically wounding him. Phelps fled the school and dropped the handgun; he was arrested shortly after. Jackson had to undergo surgery three times to save his life; he suffers from post-traumatic stress disorder. Phelps was convicted of attempted murder in August 2011 and was sentenced to thirty years in prison and five years of probation.
March 31, 2011	Houston, Texas	1	5	6	Multiple gunmen opened fire during a powder puff football game at Worthing High School. One man, an 18-year-old former student named Tremaine De Ante' Paul, died. Five other people were injured.
April 19, 2011	Houston, Texas	0	3	3	A 6-year-old boy took a semi-automatic pistol in his backpack to Ross Elementary. Later that morning, as he and more than 40 other kindergartners were having lunch in a crowded cafeteria, the boy accidentally fired the gun as he was showing it off to friends. The boy, as well as another 6-year-old boy and a 5-year-old girl, were injured. Houston police say the gun belonged to a friend of the boy's family.
May 10, 2011	San Jose, California	3	0	3	A man shot and killed two San Jose State University students in a campus parking garage, including his estranged wife. He then fatally shot himself.
May 23, 2011	Pearl City, Hawaii	0	1	1	A 14-year-old male student was accused of firing a handgun on the campus of Highlands Intermediate School, wounding one student. The gunman was arrested on suspicion of attempted murder. Two other suspects were arrested in connection with the shooting.
August 19, 2011	Albany, Georgia	0	1	1	An Albany State University student was shot on campus.
September 28, 2011	Jurupa Valley, California	2	0	2	64-year-old Donaciano Aguirre fatally shot his 61-year-old wife and teacher's aide, Maria Celia Aguirre, in the parking lot of Patriot High School (California) at 10:40 am. He then committed suicide, and the school was put on lockdown. After being searched thoroughly, no other victims were found, and students were let go late in the afternoon.
October 24, 2011	Fayetteville, North Carolina	0	1	1	Cape Fear High School shooting: 15-year-old Catilyn Abercrombie was shot in the neck with a rifle by fellow student, 15-year-old Charles Underwood, at Cape Fear High School. She was hospitalized for two months in a serious condition. Underwood was arrested and charged with attempted murder. He was convicted of attempted first-degree murder and sentenced to fifteen years in prison.
December 8, 2011	Blacksburg, Virginia	2	0	2	22-year-old Ross Truett Ashley, a part-time business student at Radford University, killed a police officer engaged in an unrelated traffic stop on the campus of Virginia Tech. He then committed suicide in a nearby parking lot.
December 9, 2011	Edinburg, Texas	0	2	2	Two students were shot after school at Harwell Middle School in Edinburg, Texas, while trying out for their school's basketball team. The shooting was allegedly done by an adult off campus, who was shooting at a target range.
December 28, 2011	Flint, Michigan	0	1	1	One person was shot and injured just behind Flint Northern High School as a basketball game was finishing inside.

== 2012 ==
12 incidents.

Date	Location	Deaths	Injuries	Total	Description
January 10, 2012	Houston, Texas	0	1	1	A student opened fire with a handgun at North Forest High School, wounding another student. The shooter said that he had been confronted by three students who had been bullying him, and he shot in self-defense. He hit a 16-year-old bystander in the leg. The 18-year-old suspect was charged with aggravated assault with a deadly weapon.
February 23, 2012	Bremerton, Washington	0	1	1	Armin Jahr Elementary School: A 9-year-old boy accidentally set off a firearm in class after slamming his backpack on a desk hitting 8-year-old Amina Kocer-Bowman in the abdomen causing her to spend 8 weeks in a hospital. The boy said he took the gun because he planned to run away from his uncle's house, where he lived, and that he planned to bring a gun with him for protection. The boy's mother, Jamie Lee Chaffin, a felon, eventually pleaded guilty to weapons charges and was sentenced to 14 months in prison. The boy made a plea agreement with Kitsap County prosecutors, taking responsibility for bringing the handgun school to and was sentenced to a year of court-supervised probation.
February 27, 2012	Chardon, Ohio	3	3	6	2012 Chardon High School shooting: 17-year-old Thomas "T. J." Lane took a semi-automatic handgun and a knife to Chardon High School, where he fired ten shots at a group of students sitting in the cafeteria. He killed three boys and wounded three other students. One 16-year-old died immediately, and two others died the following day. Lane was arrested early the next morning while standing near his car. He was charged as an adult with murder, attempted murder, and firearms offenses. In March 2013, he was convicted and sentenced to three life sentences without the possibility of parole.
March 6, 2012	Jacksonville, Florida	2	0	2	Shane Schumerth, a fired teacher at Episcopal High School, shot Headmistress Dale Regan before killing himself.
March 24, 2012	Oktibbeha County, Mississippi	1	0	1	Mason Perry Jones fatally shot Mississippi State University student John Sanderson.
April 2, 2012	Oakland, California	7	3	10	2012 Oikos University shooting: 43-year-old One L. Goh was accused of shooting dead seven students with a handgun and wounding three others at Oikos University, a Christian college. He fled the scene, stealing a victim's car, and was apprehended hours later nearby. Goh was charged with seven counts of murder. In January 2013, Goh was determined to be mentally unfit for trial and committed for treatment.
August 16, 2012	Memphis, Tennessee	0	2	2	Two Hamilton High School students were wounded in the parking lot of the school. The attack was believed to be gang-related.
August 27, 2012	Perry Hall, Maryland	0	1	1	15-year-old Robert Gladden fired two shots with a shotgun inside the cafeteria at Perry Hall School. He hit a 17-year-old senior in the lower back, causing critical wounds. The youth has Down syndrome. Gladden was subdued by two school faculty members and arrested. In February 2013, he was sentenced to thirty-five years in prison on attempted murder charges.
September 7, 2012	Normal, Illinois	0	0	0	A 14-year-old student fired multiple gunshots in a classroom ceiling at Normal Community High School, and was tackled by a teacher. Nobody was injured. The student was arrested and charged with sixteen felony counts.
October 19, 2012	Chicago, Illinois	1	0	1	18-year-old Banner Academy South student, Terrance Wright, was killed during an attempted robbery. Five would-be robbers approached Wright as he left the school about 3:40 p.m.. He was shot in the chest as he fought back when one assailant was going through his pockets. Wright had been picked on at his previous high school because he was gay, which led him to transfer to Banner.
October 31, 2012	Los Angeles, California	0	4	4	At a Halloween party on the University of Southern California campus, an argument escalated, and 20-year-old Brandon Spencer used a handgun to shoot rival gang member, Geno Hall, seven times, critically wounding him. Spencer wounded three other people, none of whom were students at USC; they were hospitalized with less serious injuries. Spencer was arrested just minutes after the shooting, which took place outside USC's Grand Ballroom at around 11:30 p.m. In April 2014, he was convicted of attempted murder and sentenced to forty years to life in prison.
December 14, 2012	Newtown, Connecticut	28	2	30	Sandy Hook Elementary School shooting: 20-year-old Adam Lanza killed twenty-six people and himself. He first killed his mother at their shared home before taking four of her guns and driving to the school, where he killed 20 first-grade children aged six and seven, along with six adults, including four teachers, the principal, and the school psychologist. Two other persons were injured. Lanza then killed himself as police arrived at the school.

== 2013 ==
26 incidents.

Date	Location	Deaths	Injuries	Total	Description
January 10, 2013	Taft, California	0	2	2	16-year-old student, Bryan Oliver, entered a science classroom of Taft Union High School with a shotgun and opened fire, critically wounding 16-year-old student Bowe Cleveland. He shot at but missed another student. The classroom teacher, Ryan Heber, convinced Oliver to drop his weapon. He was later arrested. On January 14, he was charged with two counts of attempted murder and assault with a firearm. He was convicted and accepted a plea deal with a sentence of 27 years and 4 months.
January 12, 2013	Detroit, Michigan	0	1	1	A 16-year-old Osborn High School student was shot and wounded after a basketball game.
January 15, 2013	St. Louis, Missouri	0	2	2	A 34-year-old gunman wounded an administrator in his office on the fourth floor of Stevens Institute of Business and Arts. The suspected gunman, Sean Johnson, a part-time student, wounded himself in a stairwell. Both the administrator and Johnson were hospitalized in stable condition. Johnson was convicted of three felony charges, including assault, and was sentenced to 60 years in prison.
January 15, 2013	Hazard, Kentucky	3	0	3	Two people were killed and a third person was wounded at the parking lot of Hazard Community and Technical College. The third victim, 12-year-old Taylor Cornett, died from her wounds the next day. 21-year-old Dalton Lee Stidham, was arrested and charged with three counts of murder. He was sentenced to life in prison without parole in 2014.
January 16, 2013	Chicago, Illinois	1	0	1	A 17-year-old boy, Tyrone Lawson, was killed in the parking lot of Chicago State University. The shooting happened after high school basketball games held on the campus, where Lawson had been a spectator. Police arrested two brothers, Michael McNabb, 33, and Brian Hewlett (under the alias Stephen Gilbert), 30, after the shooting and recovered a weapon.
January 22, 2013	Houston, Texas	0	3	3	Lone Star College–North Harris shooting: Outside Lone Star College–North Harris, two men got into an argument. One wounded the other. He also wounded a maintenance man and accidentally shot himself in the leg. The shooter fled into the woods and was arrested hours later. The charges against the initial suspect were dropped, and another man was arrested.
January 31, 2013	Atlanta, Georgia	0	2	2	A 14-year-old male student was wounded at Price Middle School. The gunman, a 15-year-old student, was believed to be arguing with the other student before using a handgun to shoot him. A teacher was also wounded. Afterward, the gunman was disarmed by a school resource officer and arrested; police charged him with aggravated assault.
February 1, 2013	Detroit, Michigan	1	1	2	At Martin Luther King High School, a 15-year-old was injured, and a 16-year-old was killed after they tried to rob a school coach who was walking to his car with two students after practice. The coach was the shooter and was a reserve police officer who authorities ruled was acting in self-defense.
March 18, 2013	Orlando, Florida	1	0	1	At the University of Central Florida, 30-year-old student James Oliver Seevakumaran pulled a fire alarm at the Tower One dormitory to attract a crowd. He pointed a handgun at his roommate and threatened to shoot him in their room; he released the roommate, who ran out and called 9-1-1. Seevakumaran then fatally shot himself in the head. Authorities found an assault weapon, a couple hundred rounds of ammunition and four homemade bombs inside his backpack.
April 12, 2013	Christiansburg, Virginia	0	2	2	New River Community College shooting incident: Two women were wounded during a shooting at the campus of New River Community College. 18-year-old Neil Allen MacInnis was taken into custody. In June 2014, he was sentenced to 38 years in prison.
April 16, 2013	Grambling, Louisiana	0	3	3	Three students were injured on the campus of Grambling State University.
April 18, 2013	Cambridge, Massachusetts	2 (Note: Including one of the perpetrators)	2	4	Three days after committing the Boston Marathon bombing, while still at large, the brothers Dzhokhar Tsarnaev and Tamerlan Tsarnaev shot and killed Massachusetts Institute of Technology campus police officer Sean Collier in his patrol car near MIT's Ray and Maria Stata Center. About three hours after the MIT shooting and after carjacking a vehicle, Tamerlan died in a gunfight with police in Watertown, Massachusetts. Another officer was seriously wounded. Shot in the neck and hiding in a boat parked nearby, Dzhokhar was arrested 18 hours later and hospitalized in critical condition. He was sentenced to death in 2015.
May 14, 2013	Birmingham, Alabama	0	0	0	Allegedly responding to a student fight, the mother of a student fired a weapon on the campus of Ossie Ware Mitchell Middle School. No one was injured.
June 7, 2013	Santa Monica, California	6	4 (Note: 2 by gunfire)	10	2013 Santa Monica shootings: 23-year-old John Zawahri began a killing spree at his home. After killing his 55-year-old father, Samir "Sam" Zawahri, and 25-year-old brother, Chris Zawahri, he set the house ablaze. Dressed all in black with body armor and wielding an AR-15-type semi-automatic rifle, Zawahri carjacked 41-year-old Laura Siska, shooting 50-year-old Debra Fine, as she attempted to intervene, before forcing Siska to drive to Santa Monica College. Upon arriving on the college campus, Zawahri began shooting at passing vehicles, including a police car and a city bus, leaving three people with minor injuries. Zawahri next targeted a Ford Explorer, killing the driver, 68-year-old campus groundskeeper Carlos Navarro Franco, and fatally wounding the passenger, his 26-year-old daughter Marcela Diaz-Franco, a student at the college, who died two days later. 68-year-old Margarita Gomez, who was collecting cans outside the library, died after being shot in the abdomen and chest. Zawahri opened fire on students who were trying to run away. It ended at the college library, where he opened fire on students studying for finals, before being fatally wounded in an exchange of gunfire with responding police officers.
August 20, 2013	Decatur, Georgia	0	0	0	Armed with a 7.62mm AK-47-type assault rifle and nearly 500 rounds of ammunition, 20-year-old Michael Brandon Hill entered the Ronald E. McNair Discovery Learning Academy shortly after 1:00 PM and took several employees hostage in the principal's office. Hill ordered his hostages to call local ABC News affiliate WSB-TV, declaring that he wanted a camera crew to record him killing police officers. When responding, law enforcement officers arrived at the school, Hill exited the office and fired six rounds at police, who immediately returned fire; no one was injured in the exchange, and Hill returned to the office with his hostages. During the resulting standoff with police, Hill claimed to have a bomb in his car and in the school and repeatedly threatened to kill himself and the hostages. During the standoff, police managed to evacuate the students and staff out the back of the school. Hill was eventually persuaded to surrender by one of the hostages, Antoinette Tuff, who shared stories with him and tried to keep him calm during the siege. After pleading guilty to numerous charges stemming from the incident, Hill was sentenced to 20 years in prison and 20 years of supervised probation in September 2014.
August 22, 2013	Memphis, Tennessee	0	0	0	A 5-year-old kindergarten student fired a handgun in his elementary school cafeteria. The Westside Elementary School student brought the gun to school in his backpack. While waiting for the opening bell in the cafeteria, the gun accidentally discharged one time inside the boy's backpack. There was no evidence of harmful intent, and nobody was injured. To date, the boy is the youngest documented school shooter.
August 23, 2013	Sardis, Mississippi	1	2	3	15-year-old student, Roderick Bobo, was killed during a football game at North Panola High School in what was termed a gang-related shooting. Two others were injured in the shooting. Three men were charged with being responsible for the crime.
August 30, 2013	Winston-Salem, North Carolina	0	1	1	A 15-year-old male student was shot at Carver High School, at 2:30 p.m.. He was hospitalized with minor injuries. An 18-year-old male student was apprehended without further incident. The suspected gunman is charged with assault with a deadly weapon inflicting serious injury, carrying a concealed gun, possessing and discharging a firearm, and carrying a firearm onto educational property. The shooting was believed to be related to a dispute between the suspect and the victim.
October 4, 2013	Pine Hills, Florida	0	2	2	A 16-year-old student was shot in the hip outside Agape Christian Academy after a fight broke out at 2 p.m.. A stray bullet or shrapnel hit an innocent bystander. The two victims were treated for minor injuries. The suspected shooter reportedly fled in a car with several other males and was not caught.
October 21, 2013	Sparks, Nevada	2	2	4	2013 Sparks Middle School shooting: 12-year-old seventh-grade student Jose Reyes opened fire with a handgun at the basketball courts of Sparks Middle School, injuring one student in the shoulder. Michael Landsberry, a teacher and veteran, tried to intervene and was killed by Reyes. Reyes also wounded a student while trying to help the teacher. Reyes then committed suicide by shooting himself in the head. The shooting happened before classes, and the school was evacuated and closed for the week.
November 2, 2013	Greensboro, North Carolina	0	1	1	A 21-year-old student was wounded at North Carolina A&T State University. The victim was hospitalized for serious but non-life-threatening injuries. The university was temporarily locked down that night. No suspects are in custody.
November 3, 2013	Lithonia, Georgia	0	2	2	A Stephenson High School student and a janitor were shot in an apparent confrontation between football team members and a group of teens who were not attending the school. Both were innocent bystanders.
November 13, 2013	Pittsburgh, Pennsylvania	0	3	3	After classes ended, at least one gunman came out of the woods and opened fire on three students as they were walking to their cars at Brashear High School. One student was grazed in the head, another was struck in the neck and shoulder, and a third was hit in the leg and foot. Six people were taken into custody. The shooting is believed to be drug-related.
December 4, 2013	Winter Garden, Florida	0	1	1	A 15-year-old student was wounded by a 17-year-old student near a soccer field on the campus of West Orange High School. The shooting occurred after a fight broke out between the two students. The 17-year-old suspected shooter was taken into custody several miles away from the school and is charged with attempted murder, aggravated battery with a firearm, possession of a firearm by a minor, and possession of a firearm on school grounds. In October 2014, the shooter was sentenced to twenty-five years in prison.
December 13, 2013	Centennial, Colorado	2	0	2	18-year-old Karl Pierson shot 17-year-old student Claire Davis in the head, fatally injuring her, in a hallway in Arapahoe High School. Pierson then took his own life. Pierson was armed with a shotgun, three Molotov cocktails, and a machete. He intended to shoot the librarian who had disciplined him. Claire Davis died from her injuries on December 21, 2013.
December 19, 2013	Fresno, California	0	1	1	Four teens (16, 16, 16, and 17 years old) entered Edison High School in what was believed to be a gang initiation process. After accosting a 62-year-old woman about a mile away from school grounds, they found an athletic trainer who taught at Edison High and shot him several times in the leg and stomach.

== 2014 ==
36 incidents.

Date	Location	Deaths	Injuries	Total	Description
January 9, 2014	Jackson, Tennessee	0	1	1	A 16-year-old student was charged with bringing a gun to school at Liberty Technology Magnet High School and shooting a classmate in the thigh. The incident occurred outside the school.
January 13, 2014	New Haven, Connecticut	0	1	1	A 14-year-old boy was shot a few blocks away from the Hillhouse High School athletic facility, after a basketball game, and suffered wounds in his hand and leg.
January 14, 2014	Roswell, New Mexico	0	3	3	Two people were wounded inside the gymnasium of Berrendo Middle School, at about 8:10 a.m.. An 11-year-old boy and a 13-year-old girl were airlifted to a hospital in Lubbock, Texas in critical condition. The 12-year-old suspected shooter, Mason Campbell, a seventh-grade student, was apprehended at the scene after he was talked down by a staff member and dropped the shotgun. A staff member received minor injuries. Campbell was charged with three counts of aggravated battery with a deadly weapon. He was sentenced to confinement in a juvenile detention facility until he is 21 years old.
January 17, 2014	Philadelphia, Pennsylvania	0	2	2	A student allegedly shot two other students in the gymnasium at Delaware Valley Charter School. Both victims, a male and a female, were shot in the arm. They were taken to a nearby hospital and are in stable condition, police say. Police Commissioner Charles Ramsey said at a news conference that the shooter ran out of the school after the shooting but was taken into custody near his home. 17-year-old Raisheem Rochwell was arrested and charged as an adult for aggravated assault, recklessly endangering another person, and firearms offenses. Rochwell was sentenced to two years of juvenile detention.
January 20, 2014	Chester, Pennsylvania	0	1	1	One person was critically injured at Widener University. The incident occurred around 10 p.m. outside the university sports complex and led to an 8-hour university lockdown. The suspect was not immediately found.
January 21, 2014	West Lafayette, Indiana	1	0	1	A 21-year-old student, Andrew Boldt, was killed in a classroom building on the campus of Purdue University. 24-year-old student Cody Cousins was found guilty of the murder and was sentenced to sixty-five years in prison. In October 2014, Cousins committed suicide in his cell.
January 24, 2014	Orangeburg, South Carolina	1	0	1	A 20-year-old student was killed at South Carolina State University. A 19-year-old was arrested and charged with murder.
January 25, 2014	Los Angeles, California	1	0	1	A man was killed at Los Angeles Valley College. Two suspects were arrested in the fatal shooting.
January 27, 2014	Carbondale, Illinois	0	1	1	A group of students at Rebound High School got into an argument in the school's parking lot. One student pulled out a gun and shot another student in the ensuing altercation. An 18-year-old suspect is facing charges of attempted murder.
January 28, 2014	Nashville, Tennessee	0	1	1	One student was shot in the leg in an apparent altercation over a gambling debt at Tennessee State University.
January 30, 2014	Palm Bay, Florida	0	1	1	Three students were fighting in a parking lot of Eastern Florida State College, and one pulled out a gun and shot another of the students. All three students claimed self-defense.
January 31, 2014	Des Moines, Iowa	0	1	1	After a basketball game at North High School, there was gunfire in the parking lot of the school. Six males in a black jeep had come moments before the shooting and returned at the time it happened. A ricocheting bullet injured a 15-year-old girl. While officers were gaining control of the area, teachers on the scene led students into the school building for safety.
February 10, 2014	Salisbury, North Carolina	0	1	1	A 16-year-old student was shot in the stomach on the campus of Salisbury High School during a dispute in the school gym. The 17-year-old suspect was charged with assault with a deadly weapon with intent to kill, inflicting serious injury, possession of a firearm on school property, and discharging a weapon on school property.
February 10, 2014	Lyndhurst, Ohio	0	0	0	Five shots were fired in the parking lot of Charles F. Brush High School, including one that hit an unoccupied police car. No one was reported injured, though a school basketball game was underway at the time.
February 12, 2014	Los Angeles, California	0	1	1	A male victim was shot in the back in a possible gang-related drive-by shooting near the University of Southern California. The suspect fled into the University Campus. The victim was last reported in stable condition before being transported to a local hospital.
February 22, 2014	Augusta, Georgia	0	1	1	A shooting involving a campus police officer occurred at a Georgia Regents University dormitory complex. A male suspect entered a vehicle and nearly struck an officer, who opened fire. The suspect was taken to Georgia Regents Medical Center with injuries that were not believed to be critical.
March 25, 2014	College Park, Georgia	0	0	0	An argument between students led to shots being fired in a Benjamin Banneker High School parking lot during the afternoon. Investigators believe multiple people were present when shots were fired, but it was not known how many could face charges for the incident. No one was injured in the shooting.
April 11, 2014	Detroit, Michigan	1	0	1	After a Friday evening student awards ceremony called "Grammy Night", four men who were affiliated with a gang fired into a crowd in the parking lot of East English Village Preparatory Academy. One 19-year-old, Darryl Smith, was fatally shot in the head. Smith was not a student at the academy.
May 4, 2014	Augusta, Georgia	0	1	1	Two men fired shots inside a dormitory at Paine College on Sunday, injuring one student in the head. Neither of the suspects was a student at the college.
May 5, 2014	Augusta, Georgia	0	1	1	An active shooter situation was reported at Paine College on Monday, with one person reported to be shot. The suspect was apparently apprehended and in custody. It was the second shooting incident to occur at the college campus in two days.
May 8, 2014	Lawrenceville, Georgia	0	1	1	A person was shot on the roof of a student parking lot at Georgia Gwinnett College, sustaining an injury. The specific cause has not been identified.
May 14, 2014	Richmond, California	0	1	1	A 14-year-old student was injured during a drive-by shooting in front of John F. Kennedy High School at 8:30 a.m.. He was shot as he was running towards the school campus after a fight had taken place. The student suffered a serious but stable injury to his leg. Police are searching for a suspect.
May 23, 2014	Isla Vista, California	7 (Note: 3 by stabbing; 4 by gunfire, including the perpetrator)	14 (Note: 7 by gunfire, 7 struck by motor vehicle)	21	2014 Isla Vista killings: 22-year-old former college student Elliot Rodger ambushed and stabbed to death his two roommates and their friend in his apartment, attacking each one as they arrived at different times. After the stabbings, he drove around Isla Vista, California, near the campus of the University of California, Santa Barbara (UCSB), indiscriminately shooting at people and using his vehicle to ram others. He killed three more people by gunfire before committing suicide with a gunshot to the head. Rodger killed six people, all of whom were University of California, Santa Barbara, students.
June 5, 2014	Seattle, Washington	1	2	3	Seattle Pacific University shooting: 19-year-old students, Paul Lee and Sarah Williams, and 24-year-old student, Thomas Fowler, were shot inside a hallway of Otto Miller Hall at Seattle Pacific University. Freshman Lee was rushed to Harborview Medical Center but later died. The shooter was subdued with pepper spray and tackled to the ground by student building monitor, Jon Meis, as he paused to reload his shotgun. 26-year-old Aaron Rey Ybarra was arrested at the scene and has been charged with premeditated and attempted murder. Ybarra was convicted in November 2016 and in February 2017 was sentenced to 112 years in prison.
June 10, 2014	Troutdale, Oregon	2	1	3	At around 8:30 a.m. shots were fired at Reynolds High School. 14-year-old freshman Emilio Hoffman was killed, a physical education teacher was injured, and the gunman, 15-year-old Jared Padgett, exchanged gunfire with police officers and then committed suicide in a restroom stall.
September 9, 2014	Miami, Florida	0	1	1	Towards the end of the school day, one alternative school student in Miami was shot as a small group of students tussled. The injury was minor, requiring hospitalization, and five young adults were later questioned.
September 11, 2014	Taylorsville, Utah	0	1	1	An elementary school teacher with a concealed weapon permit accidentally fired her gun in a faculty bathroom at Westbrook Elementary School. The bullet shattered a toilet, and fragments of both the bullet and the porcelain injured her leg.
September 27, 2014	Terre Haute, Indiana	0	1	1	A 20-year-old Indiana State University student was shot by another student on Saturday inside a residence hall. The injuries were not fatal, and a full recovery was expected. The shooter was arrested on the following day.
September 30, 2014	Albemarle, North Carolina	0	1	1	Two students got into an argument at Albemarle High School around 7:30 a.m. on Tuesday, and one of the students shot the other twice including once in the leg. The student who committed the shooting was allegedly involved in a stabbing of a football player last year at West Montgomery High School, which is only 20 miles (32 km) away in Mount Gilead, North Carolina. The school had held an active-shooter training over the summer, which prepared it for this incident.
September 30, 2014	Louisville, Kentucky	0	1	1	One student was injured at Fern Creek Traditional High School. The incident occurred around 1 p.m., reportedly after a student became enraged in a hallway and pulled out a gun. The student was arrested later that day.
October 3, 2014	Fairburn, Georgia	1	0	1	After a homecoming football game, a fatal shooting of 17-year-old Kristofer Hunter occurred in the Langston Hughes High School parking lot. The assailant, 18-year-old Eric Dana Johnson Jr., turned himself in a week later.
October 24, 2014	Marysville, Washington	5	3 (Note: 1 by gunfire)	8	2014 Marysville Pilchuck High School shooting. 15-year-old freshman, Jaylen Fryberg, shot five students in the school cafeteria of Marysville Pilchuck High School, four fatally, before committing suicide. An additional two were injured, unrelated to the gunfire.
November 20, 2014	Tallahassee, Florida	1	3	4	At around 12:40 a.m. EST, a gunman opened fire in or near the Strozier Library at Florida State University. Three people suffered gunshot injuries and were taken to a local area hospital. One was in critical condition, another was in good condition, and the third was shortly released after treatment. The gunman, later identified as Myron May, an alumnus from the school, started firing towards responding police officers and was fatally shot by them on the steps of the library.
November 20, 2014	Miami, Florida	1	1	2	Two teens were shot during a fight at Miami Carol City High School. One of the boys died.
December 12, 2014	Portland, Oregon	0	4	4	Rosemary Anderson High School shooting: A gunman shot three students and a man outside Rosemary Anderson High School in north Portland. A 16-year-old girl was in critical condition, while the others suffered minor injuries. Two men, aged eighteen and twenty-two, were arrested in connection with the shooting.
December 17, 2014	Wyoming, Michigan	0	1	1	At Godfrey High School, a basketball player was shot in the leg at the school parking lot after leaving basketball practice.

== 2015 ==
22 incidents.

Date	Location	Deaths	Injuries	Total	Description
January 15, 2015	Milwaukee, Wisconsin	0	3	3	A 15-year-old boy, a student's father, and a teacher were each injured in the school parking lot at Wisconsin Lutheran High School. The student had unspecified injuries that were treated. The father was shot in the knee, and the teacher was grazed in the toe. 36-year-old Michael Riley was charged with the shooting. In June 2016, Riley pled guilty to first degree reckless injury, use of a dangerous weapon, and felon in possession of a firearm and on September 2, 2016, Riley was sentenced to six years in prison and six years of extended supervision.
January 16, 2015	Ocala, Florida	0	2	2	Two were injured in gunfire that occurred after a Friday night basketball game at Vanguard High School. One was injured directly by a bullet, the other by ricocheting glass.
February 4, 2015	Frederick, Maryland	0	2	2	Two students were shot near the gymnasium of Frederick High School during a junior varsity (JV) boys' basketball game. Approximately two hundred students, staff, and faculty were placed on lockdown for several hours after the shooting while police searched for the suspects. Brandon Earl Tyler, 21, and Chandler Tristan Davenport, 19, were charged with the shooting.
February 14, 2015	Merced, California	1	0	1	16-year-old Benito Aguirre was found dead in the parking lot of Tenaya Middle School. The shooting was reported to have occurred after school hours.
February 23, 2015	Daytona Beach, Florida	0	3	3	Two students argued outside the music building at Bethune-Cookman University when one pulled out a gun. Both had guns, and it is not disclosed who did the shooting, injuring three students. A reward was offered to help solve this case.
March 30, 2015	University City, Missouri	0	1	1	Police said one person has been arrested for a shooting at Pershing Elementary School. The shooting occurred in the parking lot, with a 34-year-old man being shot in the buttocks.
April 13, 2015	Goldsboro, North Carolina	1	0	1	A faculty member was killed with a rifle in the school library of Wayne Community College. The 20-year-old gunman, Kenneth Stancil, was arrested in Florida the next day. As of January 2017, Stancil, an admitted Neo-Nazi, is being investigated for a hate crime. Stancil was later sentenced to life without parole for the murder.
April 16, 2015	Paradis, Louisiana	0	1	1	A police officer was shot outside a school in a school zone while he was directing school buses into J.B. Martin Middle School, and the suspect was apprehended at the scene.
May 12, 2015	Jacksonville, Florida	0	2	2	Police report that a 16-year-old shot five bullets into a school bus and injured two students. Apparently, there was an argument that touched on previous events.
May 14, 2015	Vallejo, California	1	0	1	A student, 17, was killed in a robbery on a trail by the campus of Jesse M. Bethel High School; two men, non-students of the school, were arrested and sentenced to 21 years for manslaughter.
May 24, 2015	Flint, Michigan	0	7	7	In the early morning hours of Memorial Day weekend, a group of people was at Southwestern Classical Academy in the parking lot. Shots rang out, and seven were injured, with two men being apprehended and charged.
August 27, 2015	Savannah, Georgia	1	0	1	22-year-old student Christopher Starks was fatally shot in a student union building at Savannah State University. Justin Stephens was charged with the murder.
September 3, 2015	Sacramento, California	1	2	3	A man arguing with at least one other person escalated into a physical fight in the parking lot of Sacramento City College. A man opened fire, killing a 25-year-old student and wounding two others. The shooting suspects: Tevita Kaihea and Charlie Hola (both 19 years old) were not arrested for the shooting until December of that year and in 2018 Kaihea was sentenced to 112 years to life in prison and Hola was sentenced to 49 years to life.
September 14, 2015	Cleveland, Mississippi	3	0	3	A man killed a woman at his home before fatally shooting an American history professor on the Delta State University campus. The shooter later committed suicide after a chase.
September 30, 2015	Harrisburg, South Dakota	0	1	1	A principal was shot in the arm and wounded at Harrisburg High School after an argument with a student. The suspect, 16-year-old Mason Buhl at the school, was taken into custody and was charged with first-degree attempted murder and sentenced to 25 years with 15 years suspended on supervised probation.
October 1, 2015	Roseburg, Oregon	10	9	19	2015 Umpqua Community College shooting: At around 10:40 a.m. PDT, a gunman, later identified as 26-year-old student Christopher Harper-Mercer, opened fire in a hall on the Umpqua Community College campus, killing eight students and a teacher, and injuring nine others. The gunman later committed suicide after engaging responding police officers in a brief gunfight.
October 9, 2015	Flagstaff, Arizona	1	3	4	2015 Northern Arizona University shooting: One student died, and three others were wounded in a shooting at Northern Arizona University. It is unclear what sparked the shooting, which took place near Mountain View Hall, a dormitory that houses most of the campus's students involved in Greek organizations. An 18-year-old student was arrested and charged with murder and aggravated assault.
October 9, 2015	Houston, Texas	1	1	2	One person died, and another person was injured after someone opened fire outside a Texas Southern University dorm.
October 22, 2015	Nashville, Tennessee	1	3	4	One person was killed, and three others were wounded in a shooting at an outdoor courtyard at Tennessee State University. The shooting may have stemmed from an argument over a dice game. A suspect has not been identified or arrested.
November 1, 2015	Winston-Salem, North Carolina	1	1	2	One person died, and another person was injured, after someone opened fire on the campus of Winston-Salem State University. A 21-year-old non-student suspect is sought.
November 20, 2015	North Las Vegas, Nevada	1	0	1	A 16-year-old student was fatally shot during a fight after school hours that involved multiple people on the campus of Mojave High School.
December 20, 2015	Wichita, Kansas	0	1	1	At Wichita West High School, an armed 17-year-old gang member ran toward the gymnasium while being followed by police after fleeing a traffic stop, an officer then shot the boy.

== 2016 ==
21 incidents.

Date	Location	Deaths	Injuries	Total	Description
January 22, 2016	Indianapolis, Indiana	0	1	1	A 15-year-old male was shot in the leg and injured during a night-time basketball game at Lawrence Central High School.
January 29, 2016	Philadelphia, Pennsylvania	0	0	0	A gunshot was fired during a fight in a stairwell at Franklin High School, and no injuries were reported. Three people were detained.
February 9, 2016	Muskegon Heights, Michigan	0	4	4	Four people, including two students, were injured during a basketball game event in the parking lot of Muskegon Heights High School.
February 12, 2016	Glendale, Arizona	2	0	2	Two 15-year-old girls died in an apparent murder-suicide at Independence High School.
February 29, 2016	Middletown, Ohio	0	4	4	15-year-old Cameron Smith, and 14-year-old Cooper Caffrey, were shot when 14-year-old James Austin Hancock, opened fire in the Madison High School cafeteria with a .380 caliber handgun. 15-year-old Brant Murray and 14-year-old Katherine Douchette also suffered shrapnel injuries. Hancock was apprehended in a nearby wooded field.
April 23, 2016	Antigo, Wisconsin	1	2	3	Two students at a prom at Antigo High School were shot and injured by 18-year-old former student Jakob Wagner. Wagner later exchanged fire with a school resource officer in the school's parking lot and was captured after being shot and wounded by police. He died hours later in a hospital.
April 26, 2016	Dodge City, Kansas	0	0	0	Uriel Adame, Juan Buendia, and Jose Guzman were arrested for a shooting at Dodge City Community College. Guzman shot at three students in a campus parking lot. No one was injured, but a gunshot struck a car. Guzman was arrested for attempted first-degree murder and conspiracy to commit aggravated robbery. Adame and Buenida were arrested for conspiracy to commit first-degree murder and conspiracy to commit aggravated robbery.
May 6, 2016	Twin Falls, Idaho	0	0	0	A 14-year-old student accidentally fired a gun in a classroom at Robert Steward Middle School. Three students were arrested.
May 15, 2016	Augusta, Kansas	0	2	2	During the Augusta High School graduation ceremony, when a man armed with a licensed and concealed handgun tucked in his sock tried to adjust it and accidentally fired it, injuring himself and a woman.
June 1, 2016	Los Angeles, California	3	0	3	2016 UCLA shooting: Mainak Sarkar, age 38, a Ph.D. student, killed his former professor, William S. Klug, age 39, a professor of mechanical and aerospace engineering, in an engineering building at UCLA. Sarkar then killed himself. Sarkar, who lived in Minnesota, also killed his ex-wife, Ashley Hasti, age 31, in her Brooklyn Park, Minnesota home.
June 8, 2016	Boston, Massachusetts	1	3	4	A student was killed, and three other people were injured when gunfire erupted outside of the Jeremiah Burke High School following a fire alarm, causing an evacuation of the school. Two suspects have been arrested.
July 7–8, 2016	Dallas, Texas	2	1	3	After killing four police officers during a protest, a gunman fled into the nearby El Centro College. He got into a shootout with officers, wounding one, before firing out of a window and killing a fifth police officer. After an hours-long standoff, police killed the gunman with a bomb robot.
September 7, 2016	Detroit, Michigan	0	0	0	At Detroit Collegiate Preparatory High School, the principal was pulling into the school parking lot when somebody fired shots at his vehicle.
September 9, 2016	Alpine, Texas	1	2	3	A 14-year-old female student shot a 16-year-old girl in an Alpine High School restroom before committing suicide. A police officer accidentally shot another officer during the incident.
September 28, 2016	Townville, South Carolina	2	3	5	2016 Townville Elementary School shooting: Three students and a teacher were wounded after a teen opened fire at Townville Elementary School. The perpetrator's father was found dead at his home soon after the shooting. One of the victims, six-year-old Jacob Hall, died 3 days after the shooting.
October 11, 2016	Mobile, Alabama	0	1	1	A student was shot in the abdomen and wounded at Vigor High School. The suspect, a 16-year-old boy, turned himself in and was charged with assault.
October 13, 2016	Columbus, Ohio	0	2	2	Two students were shot and wounded on the front lawn of Linden-McKinley STEM Academy. One was shot in the shoulder and the other shot in the chest; both were hospitalized in stable condition.
October 18, 2016	San Francisco, California	0	4	4	Four students were shot outside June Jordan High School for Equity, a San Francisco public high school. One female victim was in critical condition, while three male victims suffered minor injuries. Two people were arrested in the shooting.
October 25, 2016	Sandy, Utah	0	1	1	Police say the two teens, ages 14 and 16, were involved in a confrontation on the far north end of Union Middle School. The boys got into an argument. The argument led to a shooting. The 14-year-old shot the 16-year-old twice. He was sent to the hospital in critical but stable condition.
November 11, 2016	Auburn, Michigan	0	1	1	At Bay City Western High School, a sheriff's deputy who served as the school resource officer accidentally fired his gun inside a classroom. The stray bullet went through a wall, ricocheted, entered a classroom, and hit a teacher in the neck, causing a minor laceration.
December 1, 2016	Bountiful, Utah	0	0	0	At Mueller Park Junior High School, a 15-year-old student fired one shot into the ceiling and then pointed the weapon at his own neck. The student was confronted verbally by a teacher and another student and later arrested in possession of a shotgun, a handgun, and ammunition for each, and was sentenced to spend time in a Juvenile Justice Services facility.

== 2017 ==
18 incidents.

Date	Location	Deaths	Injuries	Total	Description
January 20, 2017	West Liberty, Ohio	0	1	1	A 17-year-old student was charged with attempted murder and other crimes after bringing a gun to West Liberty-Salem High School and firing two shots at a 17-year-old student in a bathroom with a shotgun. The victim was injured. The student "also is accused of discharging the weapon in the school's hallway before returning to the bathroom, where he was eventually taken into custody."
January 20, 2017	Seattle, Washington	0	1	1	A 34-year-old man was shot in Red Square at University of Washington while protesting the visit of controversial journalist Milo Yiannopoulos. The shooter turned himself in to the university police and was later questioned and released without being charged with a crime.
January 27, 2017	Naperville, Illinois	1	0	1	A 37-year-old Oswego man, Matthew Lange, was shot at Scullen Middle School, which is a part of Indian Prairie School District 204, at about 7:30 PM. At the time of the shooting, two non-district organizations were renting the building. The victim was killed in his car while waiting to pick his son up from a weekly Polish culture class.
March 21, 2017	King City, California	0	1	1	An 18-year-old King City High School student was shot outside the school's auditorium. The gunman ran across the school's campus and baseball field and fled the area. The school was then placed on lockdown. The victim was hospitalized with life-threatening injuries. A suspect was arrested in August 2017.
April 10, 2017	San Bernardino, California	3	1	4	2017 North Park Elementary School shooting: Cedric Anderson, age 53, of Riverside, California, died of a self-inflicted gunshot wound after shooting and killing his estranged wife, Karen Elaine Smith, age 53, in a classroom. An eight-year-old student was also fatally shot, and a seven-year-old student was injured.
May 4, 2017	Irving, Texas	2	0	2	North Lake College: Adrian Victor Torres killed a 20-year-old student, Janeera Nickol Gonzalez, whom he was stalking. He fatally shot her three times, and the college went into lockdown before discovering that the suspect had died from a self-inflicted gunshot wound.
June 14, 2017	Chicago, Illinois	0	2	2	Two girls, 7 and 13, were shot and wounded on the playground of Warren Elementary during an end-of-the-year picnic. Police speculated they may have been bystanders. Three arrests were made.
September 13, 2017	Rockford, Washington	1	3	4	Freeman High School shooting: Three students were injured and one killed after a shooter opened fire. The suspect was armed with an AR-15 and a Pistol. He shot one student with the AR-15, but the gun jammed, so he switched to his pistol. He killed one student after shooting him twice in the stomach and once in the head. A janitor stopped him. The suspect, a 15-year-old student, (Caleb Sharpe) was taken into police custody.
September 20, 2017	Mattoon, Illinois	0	1	1	Mattoon High School: A 14-year-old male student was subdued by a female teacher when he attempted to open fire in the school cafeteria at 11:33 a.m. Multiple shots were fired in the process, and one student was struck in the chest and was driven to a nearby hospital suffering non-life-threatening wounds. The student was taken into custody without further incident.
October 3, 2017	Oxford, Michigan	0	0	0	At Oxford High School, an 18-year-old male assaulted a school administrator, and when the police responded, the 18-year-old tried to grab the officer's gun, and the gun discharged. No one was injured.
October 11, 2017	Easton, Massachusetts	0	1	1	A Stonehill College employee was arrested after he accidentally shot a coworker in the leg at the David Ames Clock Farm.
October 19, 2017	Lubbock, Texas	1	0	1	After being taken into custody at his dorm, a student at Texas Tech University shot a university police officer at the campus police station before stealing his body camera and fleeing. He was captured 90 minutes later and later pled guilty to murder.
October 25, 2017	Grambling, Louisiana	2	0	2	Two men were shot and killed on the Grambling State University campus.
November 3, 2017	Lansing, Michigan	0	1	1	A 15-year-old girl was shot inside an SUV in the parking lot of Pattengill Academy.
November 13, 2017	Albany, Georgia	0	2	2	Two people were shot on the Albany State University campus.
November 14, 2017	Rancho Tehama, California	6	18 (Note: 11 by gunfire)	24	Rancho Tehama shootings: Neighbor on a rampage injured one student at Rancho Tehama Elementary School and fatally shot five adults at several locations. The secretary heard the gunfire near the school and ordered the school to go on lockdown. After a custodian and the teachers put it into action, 43-year-old Kevin Neal rammed a truck into the gate of the school and fired at the classrooms, hitting one student when a bullet pierced the wall. Neal fatally shot himself after sheriff's deputies rammed his vehicle during a pursuit.
December 7, 2017	Aztec, New Mexico	3	0	3	2017 Aztec High School shooting: William Atchison, a 21-year-old former male student, sneaked into Aztec High School disguised as a student and hid in an unlocked washroom with a Glock 9mm handgun hidden in his bag. He retreated from the washroom after being spotted by a school custodian who chased him, shouting "active shooter" and "lockdown". Atchinson was able to shoot and kill two students who were caught in the hallway before he killed himself. He had been investigated in 2016 by the FBI when he asked "where to find cheap assault rifles for a mass shooting" on an online forum.
December 19, 2017	Mount Morris Township, Michigan	0	1	1	At Beecher High School, a teenage male was shot in the parking lot when about six to eight rounds were fired after a high school basketball game.

== 2018 ==
42 incidents.

Date	Location	Deaths	Injuries	Total	Description
January 10, 2018	Denison, Texas	0	0	0	A criminal justice club student picked up a loaded gun, belonging to an advisor, which the student thought was an unloaded training weapon. She then shot at a wall target, unintentionally firing a bullet, which went through the wall and broke a window. The advisor was a licensed peace officer permitted to carry a firearm on campus.
January 20, 2018	Winston-Salem, North Carolina	1	0	1	A student was fatally shot at a party at 1 a.m. on the campus of Wake Forest University.
January 22, 2018	Italy, Texas	0	1	1	A 16-year-old male student fired at a 15-year-old female classmate that he had briefly dated in the cafeteria of Italy High School. The gunman left the school immediately after opening fire and was arrested.
January 22, 2018	New Orleans, Louisiana	0	1	1	Shots were fired from a truck in the parking lot of NET Charter High School, targeting a crowd of students during lunch time. One student was slightly injured, apparently from injuries unrelated to gunfire. One person was arrested in connection with the shooting.
January 23, 2018	Marshall County, Kentucky	2	18 (Note: 14 by gunfire)	20	2018 Marshall County High School shooting: Gabriel Ross Parker, a 15-year-old male student shot 16 people in the lobby at Marshall County High School and caused non-gunshot injuries to four others. Two 15-year-old students died: one killed at the scene, another died of wounds at Vanderbilt Medical Center.
January 26, 2018	Dearborn, Michigan	0	0	0	At Dearborn High School, an assailant fired shots from a car in the parking lot during a basketball game. Nobody was injured.
January 31, 2018	Philadelphia, Pennsylvania	1	0	1	A fight began in the school parking lot outside a basketball game at Lincoln High School, and the school went into lockdown after shots were fired. A 32-year-old male was transported by private vehicle to Nazareth Hospital with two gunshot wounds in his leg. He was transferred by helicopter to another hospital, but died from his injuries. Police announced that they are searching for an adult male suspect.
February 1, 2018	Los Angeles, California	0	5	5	Two 15-year-old students, a boy and a girl, were shot and injured inside a classroom at Sal Castro Middle School, which shares a campus with Belmont High School. Three other people suffered injuries unrelated to gunfire. A 12-year-old girl was arrested and charged with negligent discharge of a firearm.
February 5, 2018	Oxon Hill, Maryland	0	1	1	A student was taken to the hospital after exiting Oxon Hill High School and going to speak to individuals in a vehicle, who then attempted to rob and subsequently shot and wounded him in the school's parking lot. Two other students were arrested and charged with attempted murder and robbery.
February 9, 2018	Nashville, Tennessee	0	1	1	A student was shot five times in the parking lot at Pearl-Cohn High School.
February 14, 2018	Parkland, Florida	17	17	34	Parkland high school shooting: A 19-year-old former student (Nikolas Cruz), whose behavior had led to his expulsion, began shooting students and staff members with a semi-automatic rifle at Marjory Stoneman Douglas High School. Seventeen people were fatally shot, consisting of 14 students and 3 staff members, and 17 others were injured. The perpetrator shot the students in hallways and classrooms on the first and third floors of the complex and blended in with the crowd of fleeing students, and was arrested in a residential area of neighboring Coral Springs after walking away from the school. He was later charged with murder and attempted murder. The perpetrator had sat down at a McDonald's, then went to a nearby Subway. It is the deadliest mass shooting at a high school in U.S. history, surpassing the Columbine High School massacre in April 1999.
February 24, 2018	Savannah, Georgia	1	0	1	Savannah State University: A non-student was shot on campus and later died.
February 27, 2018	Itta Bena, Mississippi	0	1	1	Mississippi Valley State University: A person was shot in a recreation center. The injury was not life-threatening.
February 27, 2018	Norfolk, Virginia	0	1	1	Norfolk State University: A student was shot from an adjacent dorm room while doing homework. He was not seriously injured.
March 2, 2018	Mount Pleasant, Michigan	2	0	2	Central Michigan University shooting: 19-year-old student James Eric Davis Jr. shot and killed his parents when they came to campus to take him home for spring break. After the shooting, Davis fled, and the campus was placed on lockdown. Around 15 hours later, the police arrested him and took him to a local hospital. The incident disrupted students' travel plans and campus activities for several days. Davis was charged with two counts of murder and one count of unlawful possession of a firearm used to commit murder; however, the judge found Davis insane and was put in a Psychiatric facility.
March 7, 2018	Birmingham, Alabama	1	2	3	Huffman High School: One student was killed and another injured when shots were fired in the school building, prompting the school to go into lockdown shortly after the bell rang for school dismissal. Law enforcement originally labeled the shooting as "accidental". Subsequently, 17-year-old male student Michael Barber was charged with manslaughter and was charged as "being a certain person forbidden to possess a pistol". Although the school has metal detectors, they were not being used that day. School resource officers were onsite at the time of the shooting. Barber was sentenced to 12 months in jail.
March 7, 2018	Jackson, Mississippi	0	1	1	Jackson State University: A student was shot inside a dormitory. His injuries were not life-threatening.
March 8, 2018	Mobile, Alabama	0	1	1	University of South Alabama: One person was hospitalized after a shooting on campus.
March 9, 2018	Lexington, Kentucky	0	1	1	Frederick Douglass High School: A 16-year-old male student unintentionally shot himself with a gun he had smuggled into a classroom, sustaining an injury to his left thumb. Police announced they were charging him with wanton endangerment and possession of a weapon on school property. After the shooting, the school superintendent announced that stationary metal detectors would be installed and all students would be required to enter through them.
March 13, 2018	Seaside, California	0	1	1	Seaside High School: A teacher accidentally discharged a firearm while teaching a public safety class, injuring one student.
March 20, 2018	Great Mills, Maryland	2	1	3	Great Mills High School: The school was placed on lockdown after a shooting occurred in the morning. A 17-year-old male student, armed with a handgun, shot and fatally injured a female student (with whom he had a prior relationship) and wounded a male student. The student shot himself in the head, fatally, while the school resource officer simultaneously shot at him.
April 12, 2018	Raytown, Missouri	0	1	1	South Middle School: A man was shot in the stomach in the parking lot during a track meet.
April 19, 2018	Jackson, Michigan	0	0	0	Several shots were fired outside of Jackson High School, and two bullets were shot through the windows of two separate classrooms, both of which were occupied. No one was injured. The rounds were believed to have been fired from an apartment complex across the street.
April 20, 2018	Ocala, Florida	0	1	1	Forest High School shooting: 19-year-old Sky Bouche, a former student of the school, shot through the door of a classroom inside the school with a Sawed-off shotgun, hitting a 17-year-old student. Out of regret, Bouche surrendered to the school staff immediately after. The 17-year-old student's injuries were not life-threatening. Bouche was then arrested. In 2021, Bouche was sentenced to 30 years imprisonment.
May 5, 2018	Fowlerville, Michigan	0	0	0	A Flint Police Department officer who was off-duty accidentally fired his gun into a gymnasium floor at a wrestling tournament at Fowlerville High School.
May 11, 2018	Palmdale, California	0	1	1	Highland High School: A 14-year-old former student allegedly fired a semi-automatic rifle shortly before classes were to begin. A 15-year-old was struck in the shoulder but went into surgery and was expected to recover fully. The suspect ditched the gun in a field and was arrested nearby, and faces a charge of attempted murder.
May 16, 2018	Dixon, Illinois	0	1	1	Dixon High School: A 19-year-old student recently kicked off the football team, allegedly fired shots before graduation rehearsal. A school resource officer shot the suspect, who suffered non-life-threatening injuries.
May 18, 2018	Santa Fe, Texas	10	14	24	2018 Santa Fe High School shooting: The school was evacuated when fire alarms were pulled at 7:45 am after a gunman opened fire on multiple students and staff with a Remington 870 shotgun and a .38 caliber revolver, and shot 23 people, killing 10 and injuring 13 others. The accused shooter, 17-year-old Dimitrios Pagourtzis, started shooting in the art room, then went through the art hallway. Responding police officers then engaged Pagourtzis in a gunfight, which lasted for 25 minutes, before Pagourtzis was wounded and taken into custody. Multiple IEDs, pressure cookers, Molotov cocktails, pipe bombs, propane tanks, and other homemade explosives were also found around the school and parking lot. Pagourtzis is currently awaiting trial for capital murder and faces a sentence of up to 40 years to life in prison.
May 18, 2018	Jonesboro, Georgia	1	3	4	Mount Zion High School: An argument led to a shooting in a parking lot after a high school graduation ceremony for graduates of Perry Learning Center, killing a person and injuring three others. Mount Zion High School provided overflow parking for people attending the ceremony.
May 25, 2018	Noblesville, Indiana	0	2	2	2018 Noblesville West Middle School shooting: Two people were shot and injured in a shooting at Noblesville West Middle School in Noblesville, Indiana. The shooter is an unnamed middle school student who exited his science classroom and re-entered with a gun. When he returned, he shot a female student and the science teacher, identified as Jason Seaman. Seaman was shot in the abdomen, hip, and forearm. Seaman wrestled the gun away after both he and the female student were shot.
July 3, 2018	Overland Park, Kansas	1	1	2	At Sunrise Point Elementary School, two construction workers at the school playground were shot, one fatally, during an argument over tools between the workers and another worker. The shooter then fled the scene and attempted to carjack a vehicle at a nearby car wash. Police say shots were fired at the car wash, but no one was hit. The shooter then successfully carjacked another vehicle, and the suspect was later arrested outside of a home.
August 4, 2018	Edgewood, Maryland	1	0	1	19-year-old Thailek Jacob Willis was found in a car in the parking lot of Edgewood High School suffering from a gunshot wound to the upper torso and later died at a local hospital. 15-year-old Jaylin Jerome Brown and 16-year-old Yasin Wallace Powell were later charged with murder and armed robbery as they each were accused of shooting the victim in after attempting to rob him during a drug deal. Brown was found guilty and convicted of second-degree murder, first-degree assault, use of a firearm in the commission of a felony or violent crime, and the possession of a firearm by a person under age 21 and was sentenced to 65 years in prison with all but 20 years suspended and Powell plead guilty to armed robbery and use of a handgun in a felony and was sentenced to 20 years in prison with all but five years suspended.
August 17, 2018	Wellington, Florida	0	2	2	Two people were shot and injured at a football game in Palm Beach Central High School in Wellington, Florida.
August 20, 2018	Atlanta, Georgia	0	0	0	A shootout erupted on the campus of Georgia State University the night before classes started.
August 30, 2018	San Francisco, California	0	1	1	One student was injured when two students were joking around about guns, and one student discharged a firearm at Balboa High School in San Francisco, California. 4 students were arrested in this incident, and 2 were allowed to go back to school. The school was on lockdown along with three other schools in the area for two hours.
September 5, 2018	Providence, Rhode Island	1	1	2	William Parsons, a 15-year-old student at Central High School, was shot and killed outside Providence Career and Technical Academy in Providence, Rhode Island. Police said that two young men got into an altercation and shots were fired, hitting the victim, who was uninvolved. The 16-year-old shooter Joel Leocra accidentally shot and injured himself while trying to get away, under a mile from the scene. Leocra was sentenced to life in prison plus 10 years and must serve at least 25 years before being eligible for parole.
September 10, 2018	Memphis, Tennessee	0	1	1	A teen girl was injured after shots were fired into a school bus full of students attending Fairley High School.
September 11, 2018	North Las Vegas, Nevada	1	0	1	18-year-old student Dalvin Brown was shot at Canyon Springs High School near the baseball field and later died of his injuries at a hospital. 16-year-old Kayin French was arrested in connection with Brown's death shortly after the incident. His trial was scheduled for February 3, 2020. However, he pled guilty to voluntary manslaughter and was sentenced to 3 to 10 years in prison.
October 12, 2018	Battle Creek, Michigan	0	0	0	At Battle Creek Academy, a gunshot was fired, and one round went into a school building. Nobody was injured.
October 25, 2018	Detroit, Michigan	0	0	0	A 15-year-old student was shot at but not injured on the property of Cody High School. Three people were arrested for the shooting.
October 29, 2018	Matthews, North Carolina	1	1	2	A David W. Butler High School freshman, 16-year-old Jatwan Craig Cuffie, fatally shot sophomore Bobby McKeithen. Cuffie is in custody and charged with first-degree murder. Cuffie was sentenced to 80 to 108 months in prison after pleading guilty to manslaughter.
December 13, 2018	Richmond, Indiana	1	0	1	14-year-old Brandon Clegg attempted a shooting on Dennis Intermediate School. He took two guns and threatened to kill his mother's ex-boyfriend if he did not drive him to the school. After his mother called 911, police arrived just before he was able to begin his attack. After exchanging shots with officers, Clegg shot his way through a locked glass door and entered the school, where he continued to shoot at officers. After he was cornered in one of the school's stairwells, Clegg committed suicide by shooting himself.

== 2019 ==
57 incidents.

Date	Location	Deaths	Injuries	Total	Description
January 2, 2019	Jersey City, New Jersey	0	0	0	School resource officer Dana Jackson, assigned to Snyder High School, was cleaning his service weapon when it discharged. No injuries were reported. Jackson was removed from his assignment at the school.
January 3, 2019	Miami, Florida	0	0	0	Two men were involved in an altercation on the campus of Florida International University when one of the men pulled out a gun and fired into the air. Both men were detained, and no injuries were reported.
January 4, 2019	Columbus, Mississippi	0	1	1	A former student at the Mississippi University for Women was shot and injured, causing a multi-hour lockdown and a search for a gunman. Police stated they were investigating whether the wound was self-inflicted. No one has been detained in relation to the crime.
January 7, 2019	Belmont, California	1	0	1	Seventeen-year-old Mohammad Othman was fatally shot in the parking lot of Central Elementary School. Police believe the shooter had a connection to Othman, but neither the shooter nor Othman had a relation to the elementary school.
January 19, 2019	Overland Park, Kansas	0	2	2	A 16-year-old boy was shot in the head, and a 15-year-old boy was also injured, in a possible robbery incident in the parking lot of Lakewood Middle School in Overland Park, Kansas. The school was not in session at the time. Both victims are expected to recover.
January 25, 2019	Mobile, Alabama	0	2	2	Two males were wounded after basketball game at Davidson High School, but between Blount High School and Murphy High School, the 15-year-old suspect fled the scene before law enforcement arrived and was not arrested until February 8. His mother was arrested for harboring a fugitive.
January 30, 2019	Lithonia, Georgia	0	1	1	A man running on the Miller Grove High School track saw someone trying to break into his car, which was parked on school property. When the man confronted the person breaking into his car, he was shot once. The man was taken to a local hospital and listed as stable.
January 30, 2019	Prairie View, Texas	0	0	0	Shots were fired at Prairie View A&M University's Village 1 basketball court, according to officials. No injuries were reported.
January 31, 2019	Humble, Texas	0	1	1	Seventeen-year-old Mikael Neciosup, a student at Atascocita High School, was arrested after shooting a 16-year-old classmate who was trying to buy marijuana from him. The victim suffered wounds to the foot and torso, which were not life-threatening. Neciosup posted Snapchat videos mocking deputies and bragging about the shooting as he was being arrested. He was charged with aggravated assault and is being held on bond.
February 8, 2019	Baltimore, Maryland	0	1	1	A 25-year-old was confronted by an adult staff member of Frederick Douglass High School as to his purpose on being on school grounds. In response, the gunman shot and injured the staff member.
February 11, 2019	Seaside, California	0	0	0	A student fired a gun in Seaside High School during a verbal altercation with other students. Nobody was injured in the incident.
February 12, 2019	Kansas City, Missouri	1	0	1	During a basketball game at the Central Academy of Excellence, an argument between two groups led to the groups being escorted out in a staggered fashion. However, as the second group was being escorted out, 15-year-old Anjanique Wright in the group was shot and later pronounced dead at the hospital. Two female students (Jamya D. Norfleet, 21 and Taylor McMillon, 18) were charged with her murder. In February 2021 Norfleet pled guilty to second degree murder and unlawful use of a weapon and was sentenced in April to 28 years in prison. McMillon pled guilty in March to voluntary manslaughter and was scheduled for sentencing in June. McMillon ultimately was sentenced to 5 years in prison.
February 14, 2019	Rio Rancho, New Mexico	0	0	0	Sixteen-year-old student Joshua Owen discharged a single shot in the hallway of Cleveland High School prior to classes beginning. The school was evacuated to a soccer field and then to a nearby arena, where students were reunited with their parents. Authorities have not commented on whether Owen was targeting anyone or had a possible motive. Owen faced charges of attempted murder, unlawful carrying of a deadly weapon, and unlawful possession of a handgun. Owens has a mental illness and was found not fit to stand trial. No injuries were reported.
February 17, 2019	Arapahoe County, Colorado	1	0	1	Two adult men in an ongoing dispute about a parking space agreed to meet at Eaglecrest High School to settle the dispute. During the argument, 31-year-old Marcus Johnson produced a handgun and shot 46-year-old Anthony "T.J." Cunningham. Johnson then fled the campus, returned home, and called 911 to report the shooting. He was arrested when deputies arrived at his home. Cunningham, a former CU football player drafted by the Seattle Seahawks, died the next day of his wounds. Johnson is charged with first-degree murder.
February 26, 2019	Montgomery, Alabama	0	1	1	At Robert E. Lee High School, Michael Woods, a 17-year-old student, was shot and wounded in the arm. The gunman, a fellow student, had previously shot another student at the school in less than two years.
February 28, 2019	Cheyenne, Wyoming	0	0	0	A 17-year-old student at Cheyenne South High School fired a gun toward an unoccupied vehicle in the school parking lot, shattering its window. The student was arrested on suspicion of discharging a firearm in city limits, misdemeanor possession of marijuana, felony burglary, and larceny. No injuries were reported.
March 1, 2019	Mission, Kansas	0	1	1	A suicidal man who planned to commit suicide by cop went on a shooting spree and shot at cars and homes and Highlands Elementary School then fired several shots at the police when they arrived, the police returned fire and struck the shooter.
March 7, 2019	Grambling, Louisiana	0	1	1	A Grambling State University student was injured after an accidental discharge in a dorm by a friend's gun.
March 22, 2019	Blounstville, Alabama	0	1	1	A substitute teacher at Blountsville Elementary School unlawfully brought a small-caliber weapon into the classroom, which discharged while in his pocket. One student reportedly had minor injuries, and the substitute was arrested.
March 27, 2019	Holmes County, Mississippi	0	1	1	A 10-year-old student was struck in the hand by gunfire that some claim was fired by another student on a Holmes County elementary school bus, while school district officials claim it was a drive-by shooting.
April 1, 2019	Prescott, Arkansas	0	1	1	A 14-year-old male student with a concealed weapon shot a 14-year-old classmate at Prescott High School in what police described as a "premeditated attack". The victim was airlifted to a nearby hospital and is in stable condition. School resource officers apprehended the shooter. the shooter was charged as a juvenile.
April 17, 2019	Flint, Michigan	0	0	0	A 16-year-old male who was in the parking lot of Flex High School fired a shot into the School. The shooter had been in a fight with other students.
April 25, 2019	Texas City, Texas	0	3	3	At College of the Mainland, a police cadet student, 21-year-old Clayton Whatley, reached into his backpack and accidentally discharged a loaded handgun. Two other students were shot in the leg, and a third was grazed.
April 27, 2019	Poway, California	1	3	4	Poway synagogue shooting: A 20-year-old man with anti-Jewish ideologies opened fire at a synagogue, which housed a Jewish school and daycare, and in addition to an adult dying in the attack, a child was struck by a bullet and suffered serious but non-life-threatening wounds; the shooter was arrested and sentenced to life imprisonment.
April 30, 2019	Charlotte, North Carolina	2	4	6	2019 University of North Carolina at Charlotte shooting: A shooter on the University of North Carolina at Charlotte campus shot six people, killing two and injuring four on the last day of classes. Riley Howell, a student in the classroom, was credited with stopping the shooter.
May 4, 2019	Eugene, Oregon	1	0	1	A 21-year-old Lane Community College student was killed outside a fraternity house at the University of Oregon.
May 7, 2019	Highlands Ranch, Colorado	1	8	9	2019 STEM School Highlands Ranch shooting: A school shooting was reported at STEM School Highlands Ranch; around 1:50 p.m, two shooters targeted separate locations and killed a student and injured eight more before being arrested.
May 7, 2019	Savannah, Georgia	0	1	1	A man who was not a student at Savannah State University shot and wounded a student at a residence hall.
May 8, 2019	Chicago, Illinois	0	1	1	A 19-year-old student was shot in the neck and jaw at Second Chance High School when he and two friends were leaving the school by an 18-year-old student, Andres Salazar, who was driving a car. Salazar was charged with attempted first-degree murder and aggravated battery with a firearm.
May 17, 2019	Jacksonville, Florida	0	1	1	Arthur Davin Jones III, a 19-year-old student shot Shamon Micken, a 16-year-old student at Raines High School. Jones fled the state and was arrested days later in Georgia. Jones is being charged with attempted murder and pleaded not guilty.
June 21, 2019	Flint, Michigan	0	1	1	During a basketball competition in the gym of Carman-Ainsworth High School during a fight involving dozens of people, shots were fired and Eithan Williams, a 15-year-old student was hit in the chest. Williams left the hospital four days later, and doctors said he was lucky to be alive. Four students aged 14–16 were arrested.
July 2, 2019	Anchorage, Alaska	0	1	1	At Williwaw Elementary School, a fight broke out on the basketball court, which resulted in a teen being shot and injured.
August 8, 2019	Montgomery, Alabama	0	0	0	38-year-old Isaiah Johnson dropped his son off at Blount Elementary School, and then got into an argument with another father over a traffic dispute. He discharged a firearm into the father's vehicle.
August 27, 2019	Los Angeles, California	0	1	1	A Hollenbeck Middle School student was standing in the lunch line was struck in the jaw by a bullet fired from off campus.
August 30, 2019	Toledo, Ohio	0	1	1	As spectators were leaving a football game Central Catholic High School. a 16-year-old boy was shot by another teen, neither of the students attended Central Catholic High School and no fights happened before the shooting, no arrests were made.
August 31, 2019	Mobile, Alabama	0	10	10	17-year-old Deangelo Dejuan Parnell shot 10 people during a confrontation at a stadium where a high school football game was being played. A tenth person suffered a stroke. In 2022, Parnell accepted a plea deal and plead guilty to Count one Attempted Murder, Count three Attempted Murder and Count nine Attempted murder and was sentenced to a split 20-year sentence and will be eligible for release after 5 years.
September 6, 2019	Pittsburgh, Pennsylvania	1	0	1	Near the end of a football game at Jeannette High School, Damien Williams and Greg Harper got into an argument outside the stadium. The argument escalated to the point where Williams was shot in the chest by Harper after Williams allegedly punched Harper twice. Williams died, and Harper was charged with homicide and reckless endangerment. Harper initially pleaded not guilty and claimed he acted in self-defense. In March 2022, Harper pled guilty to third-degree murder and was sentenced to 11 to 25 years in prison.
September 12, 2019	Manhattan, Kansas	0	3	3	At the Manhattan High School parking lot, shots were fired between two groups during a botched drug deal.
September 13, 2019	Newport News, Virginia	0	3	3	After a football game at Todd Stadium, the school stadium, shots were fired, and three teens, ages 14 and 19, were injured. No arrests have been made.
September 14, 2019	Fort Worth, Texas	0	2	2	As a youth football game was happening at Eastern Hills High School, parents got into a fight, and shots were fired, injuring a woman and her 12-year-old daughter. Thirty-nine-year-old Chanita Holly was arrested and charged with making terroristic threats; a man who was reportedly wearing a skeleton mask is also a suspect in the incident and is believed to be the trigger man.
September 20, 2019	Philadelphia, Pennsylvania	0	2	2	During the second quarter of a football game between Imhotep Institute Charter High School and Mastery Gratz High School at Marcus Memorial Stadium, multiple gunshots were fired, a 15-year-old was shot in the thigh, and a 14-year-old was shot in the foot. The Police said multiple shell casings were found, but it is unclear if the shooting happened in or outside the stadium. No suspects have been arrested.
September 27, 2019	Richmond, California	0	3	3	As people were leaving a football game at De Anza High School against Pinole Valley High School, police responded to reports of a fight across the street. Three teens were injured with gunshot wounds, two seriously. No arrests were made, and police have no motive for the shooting.
October 13, 2019	Nashville, Tennessee	1	0	1	A 19-year-old student was found unconscious with a bullet wound to his abdomen. Authorities said there were no reports of a shooting or suspicious activity on campus. Another student, George Wells, was later charged with reckless homicide.
October 22, 2019	Santa Rosa, California	0	1	1	A 16-year-old student was shot twice, at least once in the abdomen, by a 17-year-old classmate across the street from Ridgway High School, an alternative school next to Santa Rosa High School. The victim was hospitalized in stable condition. The 17-year-old was arrested in a classroom, and the gun used was found later that night in a bush three miles away. He is charged with attempted murder.
November 5, 2019	Hazleton, Pennsylvania	0	1	1	Four people were charged after a fight at Hazleton Area High School in Luzerne County that left three students hurt, one of them, 19-year-old Noberto Polanco-Rodriguez, who was admitted to shooting one of the students with an orange flare gun that caused a serious injury to one of the students' arms, and is charged with aggravated assault. Luis Arizmendy-Nunez, 22; Christhofany Maria, 19; and Jose Antonio Vargas,19, were charged with simple assault.
November 11, 2019	Baltimore, Maryland	0	1	1	A 19-year-old student who was outside Reginald F. Lewis High School was approached by a masked man who shot him in the leg.
November 13, 2019	Los Angeles, California	1	0	1	A man who was carrying a sword was fatally shot by a deputy at the courtyard of Esteban Torres High School.
November 14, 2019	Santa Clarita, California	3	3	6	2019 Saugus High School shooting: Five people were shot, two fatally, and three were injured in a shooting at a courtyard of Saugus High School. The shooter, a 16-year-old male student, attempted suicide by shooting himself in the head. He was taken into custody and died the next day during hospitalization. The gun used was suspected by police to be a privately made firearm.
November 15, 2019	Pleasantville, New Jersey	1	2	3	Five men opened fire during a playoff game between the Camden Panthers and the Pleasantville Greyhounds at Pleasantville High School, injuring a 15-year-old boy, a 27-year-old male, and fatally injuring a 10-year-old boy. All five were later arrested for the random act of violence; however, the injured 27-year-old (who is believed to be the shooter's target) has also been charged with unlawful possession of a handgun. The alleged shooter Alvin Wyatt has been charged with murder and attempted murder.
November 19, 2019	Chicago, Illinois	1	2	3	Shooting of Rylan Wilder: Police from Des Plaines pursued a bank robbery suspect into UpBeat Music and Arts, a music school in Chicago's Old Irving Park neighborhood. The bank robber and police engaged in a shootout, during which the bank robber was killed, and a teenager interning at the school was shot in the arm by police. Before entering the school, the bank robber also shot and wounded a Chicago Police officer.
November 23, 2019	Union City, California	2	0	2	Two boys, aged 11 and 14 years old, were shot in the parking lot of the Searles Elementary School around 1 am while sitting in a minivan. Both boys died of their wounds, one at the scene and the other at the hospital. 18-year-old Jason Cornejo of Castro Valley and a 17-year-old juvenile from Hayward were arrested on February 14, 2020. The shooting had possible gang motivations. A third suspect, 20-year-old Carlos Gilberto Zepeda, was arrested on December 11, 2020.
November 26, 2019	Salmon Creek, Washington	2	1	3	At Sarah J. Anderson Elementary school, Keland Hill shot and killed his estranged wife, Tiffany, and wounded Tiffany's mother while Tiffany and Keland's three children were with them in a vehicle in the school's parking lot. Tiffany had a restraining order against Keland for domestic violence. Keland shot and killed himself after a short car chase with deputies.
December 3, 2019	Oshkosh, Wisconsin	0	2	2	Grant Fuhrman, a 16-year-old male student at Oshkosh High School, was shot by resource officer Mike Wissink after stabbing him with a barbecue fork and was in stable condition. Fuhrman was charged with attempted intentional homicide.
December 4, 2019	Jackson, Mississippi	0	1	1	An individual who was not a student was shot at the edge of campus by a shooter driving a Honda Accord. This resulted in a campus lockdown. One person was injured and transported to a hospital with non-life-threatening injuries.
December 10, 2019	Kansas City, Kansas	0	0	0	At J.C. Harmon High School, a drive-by shooting occurred outside the school, and one of several bullets fired hit a school bus. Nobody was injured.
December 16, 2019	New Haven, Connecticut	0	1	1	A man dropping off his child at the Catholic Academy of New Haven was shot and wounded, and 7 of 10 bullets that were fired in the incident struck the school building. A bullet tore into the walls of a pre-school classroom; no children were hurt.
December 19, 2019	Naples, Florida	1	0	1	A 28-year-old woman was shot and killed at Lely High School, and her shooter, 50-year-old Jose Alfredo Avila Pena, who was in a relationship with the victim, was charged with second-degree murder. The principal of the school said the shooting was the result of a domestic violence incident. Pena was sentenced to life in prison.

== See also ==
- List of school shootings in the United States by death toll
- List of school shootings in the United States (before 2000)
- List of school shootings in Europe
- Lists of school-related attacks
- List of mass shootings in the United States
- List of unsuccessful attacks related to schools
