= Saugus High School =

Saugus High School may refer to:

- Saugus High School (California), a public high school in Santa Clarita, Los Angeles County, California, U.S.
  - 2019 Saugus High School shooting
- Saugus High School (Massachusetts), a public high school in Saugus, Essex County, Massachusetts, U.S.
