= Texas school shooting =

Texas school shooting may refer to:

- University of Texas tower shooting, Austin, Texas, August 1, 1966
- Santa Fe High School shooting, Santa Fe, Texas, May 18, 2018
- Robb Elementary School shooting, Uvalde, Texas, May 24, 2022

== See also ==
- Assassination of John F. Kennedy by Lee Harvey Oswald shooting from the Texas School Book Depository in Dallas, Texas, November 22, 1963
- Spring High School stabbing
- 2016 shooting of Dallas police officers by Micah Xavier Johnson shooting from the El Centro College in Dallas, Texas, July 7, 2016
- List of mass shootings in the United States
