= List of school shootings in Australia =

These chronological lists of school shootings in Australia that occurred at primary/secondary public and private schools, as well as at colleges and universities, and on school buses. A "school shooting" is defined by this list as any discharge of a firearm on school grounds while students and staff are present for educational activities. Excluded from this list are the following:

1. Incidents that occurred as a result of wars.
2. Incidents that occurred as a result of police actions.
3. Suicides or suicide attempts involving only one person.

== 20th century ==
20 incidents.

Date	Location	Deaths	Injuries	Total	Description
6 March 1924	Hurstville, New South Wales	0	1	1	A 13-year-old brought a gun to school from his home and was showing it to 14-year-old James Eldridge when the gun discharged, seriously wounding Eldridge.
18 July 1930	Nailsworth, South Australia	2 (Note: Including two of the perpetrators)	4	6	After four convicts escaped Yatala Labour Prison, they were pursued by police in a running gunfight and eventually crashed opposite the Nailsworth School. Shots were fired between the prisoners and police in the schoolyard. In total, two perpetrators were killed and two officers and two civilians were wounded.
19 November 1931	Longwarry, Victoria	1	0	1	8-year-old Clarence Budick was accidentally shot dead by another student who had found a loaded gun at North Longwarry State School.
23 September 1943	Newtown, Queensland	1	0	1	11-year-old Desmond Hoddle was accidentally shot dead at the Newtown State School.
18 October 1945	Manly, New South Wales	1	0	1	Manly Junior High School student Robert James Alder accidentally shot 14-year-old Colin Boyd to death inside a classroom.
11 April 1946	Sydney, New South Wales	0	1	1	14-year-old Graham Winslow was accidentally shot in the groin in a classroom at Naremburn Intermediate High School.
27 February 1948	Gosford, New South Wales	0	1	1	A 13-year-old accidentally shot himself on the grounds of Gosford Primary School.
31 August 1949	Tardun, Western Australia	0	1	1	13-year-old Charlie Joseph was accidentally shot at school.
16 September 1949	Parkside, South Australia	0	2	2	A 10-year-old accidentally discharged a gun at Parkside School, wounding himself and a classmate.
14 September 1951	Shepparton, Victoria	0	0	0	A person fired a shot into a classroom at Shepparton High School, narrowly missing a teacher.
11 September 1952	near Barnes, New South Wales	0	1	1	A 19-year-old male fired a shot into a school bus from a passing truck, grazing a girl.
6 October 1954	Enmore, New South Wales	1 (Note: Including the perpetrator or suspect)	1	2	A man shot and wounded his wife before fatally shooting himself in the music room of Enmore Public School.
26 June 1956	Hobart, Tasmania	1	1	2	A rifle was fired at students in the schoolyard of Bothwell Area School, killing 8-year-old Frances Gladys Mann and wounding another student. A 17-year-old was charged with manslaughter.
20 September 1960	Dandenong, Victoria	0	0	0	A 19-year-old man broke into Dandenong High School and barricaded himself in a classroom while firing shots during a three-hour standoff with police. The shooter's girlfriend eventually convinced him to surrender his weapon, and he was arrested.
5 July 1967	Nudgee, Queensland	1	0	1	17-year-old John Francis Treacy was killed by a man at St Joseph's College, Nudgee. The shooter surrendered the following day.
20 March 1968	Campbelltown, New South Wales	0	1	1	A 14-year-old boy shot and wounded another student outside Campbelltown High School.
19 June 1991	Coffs Harbour, New South Wales	0	3	3	A Orara High School student fired a rifle at people on a sports field, wounding two teachers and a 12-year-old before being subdued by other students and arrested.
31 March 1993	Banksia Park, South Australia	0	2	2	A 14-year-old Banksia Park International High School student fired shots into the administration building's doors and engaged in a three-hour standoff before surrendering to police. Two people were wounded.
11 October 1996	Sunshine, Victoria	0	1	1	A six-year-old child accidentally fired a gun in the playground of Sunshine Heights Primary School after being given the weapon by an adult. Another student was grazed.
3 August 1999	Melbourne, Victoria	1	1	2	A 38-year-old man opened fire at a bar on the campus of La Trobe University, killing a man and wounding another person before being subdued and arrested.

== 21st century ==
6 Incidents.

Date	Location	Deaths	Injuries	Total	Description
21 October 2002	Melbourne, Victoria	2	5	7	Monash University shooting: A graduate student at Monash University opened fire in a classroom, killing two students and wounding four students and a lecturer before he was tackled and disarmed.
18 October 2005	Yiyili Community, Western Australia	2	0	2	A 19-year-old shot and killed a 35-year-old man at a school before killing himself.
7 May 2012	Adelaide, South Australia	0	0	0	A teenager took a revolver to Modbury High School and fired a shot, hitting no one. He and his father were arrested.
24 May 2023	Two Rocks, Western Australia	0	0	0	A 15-year-old student armed with two rifles fired three rounds at Atlantis Beach Baptist College, hitting nobody. Police arrested him at the scene.
30 May 2023	Macquarie Fields, New South Wales	0	0	0	A bullet struck a window of an occupied classroom at Macquarie Fields Public School.

== See also ==
- List of mass shootings in Australia
- Crime in Australia
- Timeline of major crimes in Australia
- List of school-related attacks
  - List of attacks related to primary schools
  - List of attacks related to secondary schools
  - List of attacks related to post-secondary schools
