= Saugus High School shooting =

2019 mass shooting in California, U.S.

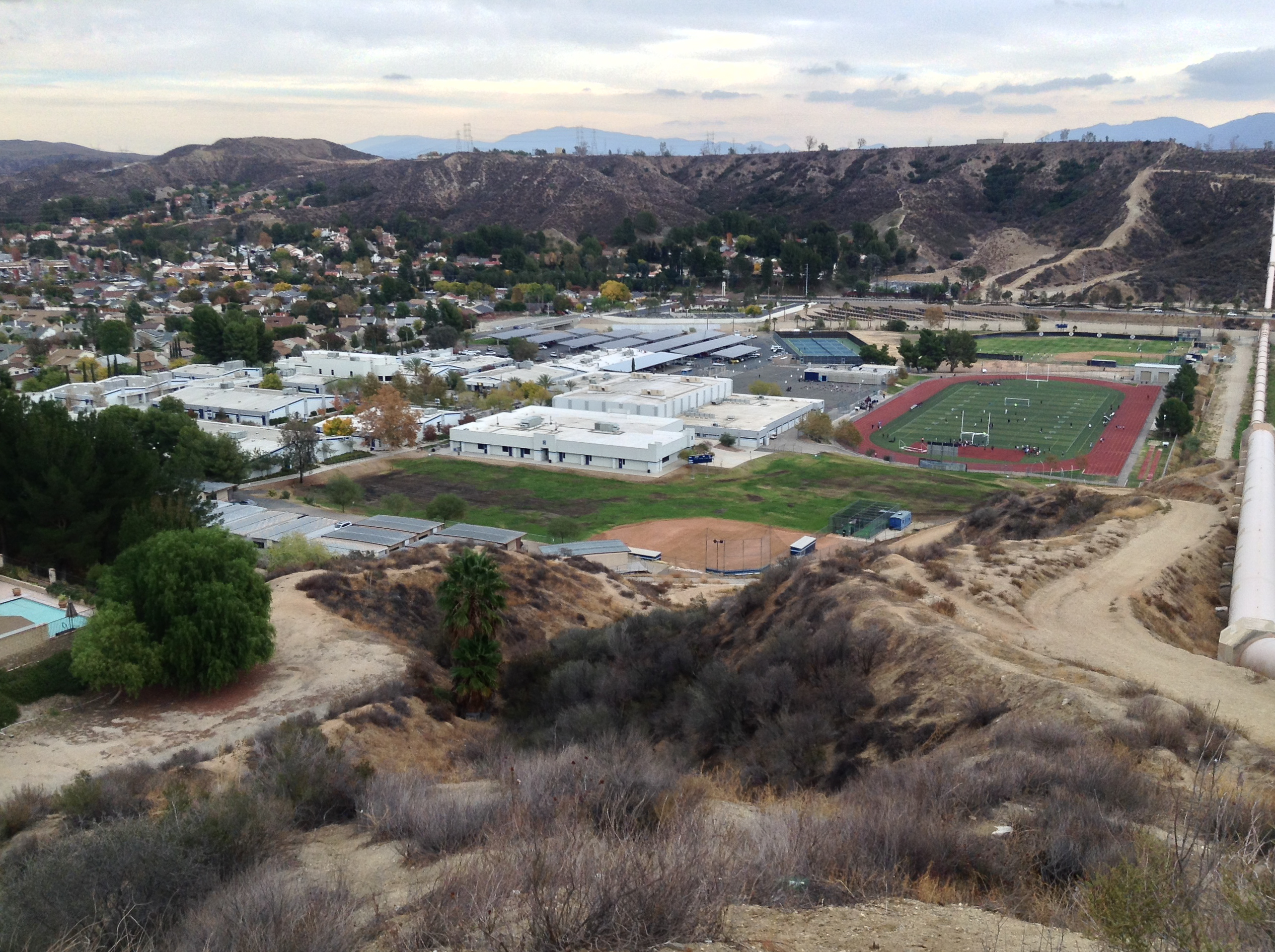
- Saugus High School in November 2014

- Saugus High School shooting (Santa Clarita) Saugus High School shooting (California) Saugus High School shooting (the United States)
- Location: 34.442°N 118.5184°W; Santa Clarita, California, U.S.
- Date: November 14, 2019; 7:38 a.m. (PST UTC−08:00)
- Target: Saugus High School
- Attack type: School shooting; mass shooting; double-murder; murder–suicide
- Weapon: .45 caliber 1911-model (privately made)
- Deaths: 3 (including the perpetrator)
- Injuries: 3
- Victim: School students
- Perpetrator: Nathaniel Tennosuke Berhow
- Motive: Unknown
- Litigation: 3 (Note: Lawsuit by the victims's families against the perpetrator's mother Lawsuit by injured victim against the ghost gun kit seller who sold the ghost gun to the perpetrator's father Wrongful death lawsuit by the victims's families against school district settled for $50 million)

On November 14, 2019, at Saugus High School in Santa Clarita, California, United States, a school shooting occurred when a student with a pistol, identified as 16-year-old Nathaniel Berhow, shot five schoolmates, killing two, before killing himself.

== Background ==
As a response to the rise of school shootings elsewhere in the United States, the William S. Hart Union School District had undertaken a number of measures to improve security at the school. According to the district's website, all schools have a school resource officer assigned to each campus. Schools are surrounded by fencing and supervisors monitor those who enter and exit the campus.

Saugus High School has fencing and at least a dozen security cameras, but no metal detectors. The gates for the school are routinely locked during instructional time and would be opened only for students to leave for lunch or to leave school at the end of the day. Visitors are required to sign in and out of the school. The schools hold at least two lockdown drills per year, and use a "Text-a-Tip" hotline for students to report suspicious behavior. Each school has a "Safe Schools Ambassador," a student trained to work within their peer groups to prevent bullying, teasing, and violence on campuses.

Earlier in 2019, students at Saugus High School had participated in a class project to create a training video for dealing with an active shooter. Students who happened to be near this November shooting credited this project with helping them know how to respond. Each classroom was equipped with gunshot wound kits; at least one wounded student was medically treated from one of these kits during this event.

== Shooting ==
Towards the end of first period classes at Saugus High School on November 14, 2019, while some students were in the outside courtyard or quad, Saugus High School junior Nathaniel Berhow, who had waited for the first period classes to end for nearly an hour outside, put his sunglasses on, pulled a handgun from his backpack and fired on fellow students there.

The weapon was later identified by Los Angeles County Sheriff as a .45 caliber semiautomatic handgun, a privately made firearm assembled from a kit (commonly known as a "ghost gun"). Surveillance footage documented Berhow's actions: after he fired one round, the pistol apparently jammed. He fixed it, shot an additional four people with the next rounds, including one in the stomach, and used the last to shoot himself in the head. The shooting started at 7:38 am and lasted sixteen seconds. The handgun was found outside in the area of the shooting.

Three off-duty police officers, who had just dropped off relatives at the school, were the first responders on the scene: a detective with the Los Angeles County Sheriff's Department and police officers from Inglewood and Los Angeles. They were joined within a minute by uniformed deputies on duty from the sheriff's station in Santa Clarita, as well as a sheriff's deputy who works at the school as the school resource officer. The Los Angeles County Fire Department said firefighters also responded to the shooting before 8 a.m. Santa Clarita is a contract city that uses county sheriff and fire services in lieu of operating its own police and fire departments.

Many students fled the area and some left the campus, while warning others. Teachers moved students away from danger into classrooms. One injured student escaped the quad and took refuge in the school's choir room, where the teacher barricaded the door and rendered first aid. Of those who barricaded themselves in classrooms, many used lessons learned in school shooting drills to fortify their protection. One student recounted that a student passed out scissors to all students in the room following the drill's recommendation to arm themselves with scissors, chairs, or anything heavy, in case the shooter were to find the hiding students.

== Victims ==
Two freshmen students, 15-year-old Gracie Anne Muehlberger and 14-year-old Dominic Michael Blackwell, were killed, along with the perpetrator himself. A singular bullet penetrated Muehlberger's backpack, entered her back, and exited through her chest.

Three freshmen, Addison Koegle and Andrew Gardetto, both 14, and 15-year-old Mia Tretta, were injured. Four students were hospitalized at the Henry Mayo Newhall Memorial Hospital, three in critical condition, including the shooter. Two were transported to Providence Holy Cross Medical Center. The last injured student was released from the hospital on November 18. Aside from all being students of Saugus High School, the gunman and his victims reportedly had no known personal connection.

== Perpetrator ==
The perpetrator was identified as Nathaniel Tennosuke Berhow (November 14, 2003 – November 15, 2019), a junior at Saugus High School. Berhow carried out the shooting on his 16th birthday. He shot himself in the head with his last bullet and died the following day at 3:32 pm in a hospital with his mother next to him.

Berhow lived with his mother, Mami Matsuura. He also had an older sister named Samantha Berhow, who no longer lived with them at the time of the shooting. His father, Mark Berhow, died of a heart attack in December 2017. Mark had several run-ins with the police. In 2013 and 2015, he plead no contest to driving under the influence, being sentenced to 45 days in jail and 5 years of probation. In 2015, he was arrested on suspicion of attempted battery of a spouse, though formal criminal charges were not ultimately filed in that specific instance. He was placed on a psychiatric evaluation (a 5120 hold) for this incident.

Several students described Berhow as a quiet student who "seemed like one of those regular kids". Berhow was a Boy Scout and a junior varsity cross country runner for Saugus High School. Described as a good student, Berhow was taking an AP European History class. He also had a girlfriend.

== Investigation ==
Police documented the crime scene using a 3-D scanner. The school arranged to have it cleaned by November 15.

Los Angeles County detectives joined with officials from the Federal Bureau of Alcohol, Tobacco, Firearms and Explosives to determine whether the gun was made from a kit, that is, parts purchased separately and then assembled. Berhow was too young to have legally purchased such a handgun in California.

During a separate investigation of Berhow's family home, the officers discovered several weapons, some of which were not registered. These may have belonged to his late father, who is reported to have been an avid hunter. The police confiscated the arsenal. A friend said that Berhow had grown up around guns and was taught to use them responsibly.

The county sheriff announced that the handgun used in the shooting was a privately made firearm, assembled from interchangeable parts without markings. It remained unclear whether the gun was assembled by Berhow or Berhow's father before his death in 2017. Whoever assembled the gun kit was able to avoid many existing regulations regarding definition and registration of firearms, and associated background checks for possession and transfer.

During the same search of Berhow's home, authorities told reporters that they had found no evidence to help them identify a motive: neither manifesto, diary, nor suicide note. Given the shooter's demonstrated familiarity with the weapon and speed of the attack, the county sheriff said he believed that Berhow had planned the shooting.

Police found a journal owned by Berhow, where he wrote about cutting himself to "see the blood flow". He had also described himself as "partially sadistic and psychotic". He also said that he would go to Germany after he "leaves a mark" in America. Police also found a story written by Berhow depicting the shooting and killing of a rabbit in graphic detail, a story with references to shotguns, a character killing 15 citizens and drawings of dead characters and others armed with rifles.

== Aftermath ==
Parents of students commended the school for having undertaken active shooter drills and its response during this event. They said the school's alert system kept them regularly updated about the incident. Some students told reporters they knew what to do based on previous drills. Some students discussed the potential identity of the shooter through social media, but policed the postings and refused to spread false information.

The district closed other schools until the following week. Students were able to collect belongings left at Saugus High accompanied by a guard. Classes at Saugus High did not resume until December 2.

Members of the community worked to offer emergency mental health support, grief counseling, prayer services or service dedications, and vigils to honor the victims and survivors. A memorial was created outside the high school, and a graduate brought a banner on which to write messages to the dead.

At a football game on November 15, the school and students arranged to commemorate the dead. Fans chanted "Saugus Strong!", displayed the motto on stickers and signs, held a moment of silence, and released balloons. A "Saugus Strong" website was launched on November 15 for community resources, and supportive, loving messages were included. Another vigil was planned for students and the community on November 17, with a reported 10,000 individuals present to commemorate the two deceased victims and all those affected.

Nearby schools were placed on lockdown throughout the morning of the shooting. At Pasadena High School, a group of students pasted 2,000 encouraging phrases, such as "You can do it", on each student's locker the day after the shooting, to give support to each other.

On February 18, 2021, the words "In Memoriam Gracie Muehlberger and Dominic Blackwell" were added to the sign at the entrance to Central Park to honor the victims of the shooting, following a decision by the Santa Clarita Water Board on December 15, 2020.

In October 2023, the victims' families sued the school district, claiming that it failed to prevent the shooting from happening.

== Response ==
=== Political ===
Politicians such as President Donald Trump, Vice President Mike Pence, Senator Kamala Harris, and California Governor Gavin Newsom all used Twitter to express condolences for the victims and thoughts on the shooting. Many of the Democratic presidential candidates referred in their posts to gun control and stopping future school shootings. Celebrities also used social media to express their condolences about the shooting.

U.S. Senators Richard Blumenthal and Chris Murphy, both Democrats from Connecticut, had been advocating for universal background checks when news of the shooting broke. When informed of events by an aide, Blumenthal incorporated the news into his speech, saying: "As I speak, on the floor right now, there is a school shooting in Santa [Clarita], California. How can we turn the other way? How can we refuse to see that shooting in real time, demanding our attention, requiring our action?" Organizations and activists such as Fred Guttenberg and Everytown for Gun Safety used the shooting to highlight their frustration at the lack of action by Senate Majority Leader Mitch McConnell, since he had led no action since calling for it after the El Paso shooting. Gun rights supporters disputed that any of the proposed gun control laws would have prevented the shooting and pointed to the gun control laws already in place in California that failed to prevent it.

=== Teacher and students ===
Gina Painter, a teacher at Saugus, wrote an opinion piece for The Washington Post in which she stated her concern about the lack of action by politicians and organizations. She noted how common such shootings have become, as someone said to her, "It could have been worse. It's not like Saugus is Sandy Hook." She objected to US Senator Cindy Hyde-Smith blocking a gun control bill during the shooting.

Students took to social media to post about the shooting. Others raised concerns about going back to school in the aftermath. A student said in an interview with CNN that "...with the state of America right now, with gun control not being strict enough, with kids being able to access guns so easily, it didn't surprise me."

One of the injured students, Mia Tretta, survived after being shot in the stomach. She went on to become an advocate for firearm safety. Tretta was a student at Brown University when another fatal school shooting occurred there in December 2025.

== See also ==
- List of mass shootings in the United States in 2019
- List of school-related attacks
- List of school shootings in the United States
- List of school shootings in the United States by death toll
- List of homicides in California
- List of shootings in California
- 2019 Blagoveshchensk college shooting — another school shooting incident that happened on the same day
