= List of school attacks in the Philippines =

This chronological list of school attacks in the Philippines that occurred at K–12 public and private schools, as well as at colleges and universities, and on school buses. Excluded from this list are the following:

1. Incidents that occurred as a result of police actions.
2. Suicides or suicide attempts involving only one person.

== List ==
Date	School	Location	Perpetrator(s) or suspect(s)	Dead	Injured	Total	Description
13 January 2014	Cotabato Foundation College of Science and Technology	Arakan, Cotabato	Unknown	0	24	24	A bombing at a university injured 24 people.
17 October 2019	Mindanao State University	Marawi, Lanao del Sur	Unknown	1	0	1	Student Ivan Polinar Almeda was fatally shot on campus by an unknown gunman.
4 August 2025	Balabagan Trade School	Balabagan, Lanao del Sur	"Kaizer"	1	0	1	A student upset over being given a failed grade shot and killed his teacher.
7 August 2025	Santa Rosa Integrated School	Santa Rosa, Nueva Ecija	Menard Canoza	2 (Note: Including the perpetrator or the suspect)	0	2	An 18-year-old man entered a school and shot his 15-year-old ex-girlfriend, Zhane Entinado, before shooting himself. Both of them died of their injuries in the following days.
16 June 2026	Bethel Academy	Santa Clara, General Trias, Cavite	14-year-old girl	0	7	7	2026 General Trias school stabbing: Seven students were stabbed and injured. A 14-year-old girl was arrested.
22 June 2026	San Jose National High School	Tacloban, Leyte	"Rod" "Nash"	3	20	23	2026 Tacloban school shooting: Eighteen people were shot, three of them fatally. Two teenagers were arrested.
18 August 2026	Ateneo de Zamboanga University	Zamboanga City, Zamboanga Peninsula	Mohammad Mael Jalani	2	23	25	2026 Ateneo de Zamboanga University shooting: Two students, including the attacker, were killed in a shooting.
18 September 2026	Banga National High School	Banga, South Cotabato	Lucky Jeanrich Lope	3	6-8	9-11	2026 South Cotabato school shooting: A student opened fire, killing two people and wounding at least six others before killing himself.

== See also ==
- Lists of school-related attacks
- School bullying
- School shooting
- School violence
