= List of school attacks in Thailand =

This is a list of attacks on schools in Thailand. The term "attack" includes cases where one or more perpetrators intend to kill or injure people at an educational establishment.

== List ==
=== 20th century ===
Date	City	Location	Perpetrator(s)	Dead	Injured	Total	Description	Notes
March 3, 1976	Bang Phlat	Bangkok		3	2	5	Bombing at Phraramhok Technological College: Bombing hits five people, killing some of them.	
September 21, 1976	Nong Khaem	Bangkok		5	60	65	Bombing results in five dead and hundreds injured at Mubankru Technological College	
October 6, 1976	Sanam Luang	Bangkok	Royal Thai Police; Village Scouts; Nawaphon; Red Gaurs; Right-wing bystanders	40+	167	207+	Thammasat University massacre	
August 3, 1983		Chiang Rai	Suthat Wannasarn (43)	3	3	6	Suthat Wannasarn, armed with a stick and a sword, attacked children at a nursery school, killing three and wounding three others	

=== 21st century ===
Date	City	Location	Perpetrator(s)	Dead	Injured	Total	Description	Notes
June 4, 2002	Ban Kha	Ratchaburi	Unnamed shooters	3	12	15	Armed assailants fired shots at a school bus that was trying to evade the group; three people died.	
June 6, 2003	Nakhon Si Thammarat	Nakhon Si Thammarat	Anatcha Boonkwan (17)	2	4	6	Pak Phanang school shooting: A student shot six classmates at a high school; two 17-year-old students died in the attack.	
September 9, 2005	Bangkok	Bangkok	Jitrada Tantiwanichayasuk (34)	0	4	4	A 34-year-old woman identified as Jitrada Tantiwanichayasuk stabbed four girls at a school before fleeing on a motorcycle	
January 9, 2006	Sam Phran	Nakhon Pathom	‘‘Unnamed perpetrator’’	1	0	1	An 18-year-old female student was fatally shot by an 18-year-old male student inside a classroom at Nakhon Prasit School. The two students had previously been in a relationship.	
March 17, 2007	Saba Yoi	Songkhla	Unnamed perpetrators	3	7	10	A group of perpetrators attacked an Islamic school, killing three and wounding seven others.	
January 17, 2011	Chai Badan	Lopburi	‘‘Unnamed perpetrator’’	1	0	1	A 17-year-old student was killed by a physical education teacher inside the school grounds.	
March 2, 2017	Khok Sato	Narathiwat	Unnamed perpetrator	4	1	5	Four unidentified gunmen opened fire on people who were on a school bus, killing four people	
December 18, 2019	Nonthaburi	Nonthaburi	‘‘Unnamed perpetrator’’	1	0	1	A 14-year-old student was fatally shot by a 12-year-old student inside Anurach Prasit School.	
September 14, 2022	Bangkok	Bangkok	Yongyuth Mangkonkim (58)	2	1	3	A shooting attack occurred at the Army War College, resulting in the death of two people and the wounding of a third. The shooter from Yongyuth Mangkonkim later surrendered.	
October 6, 2022	Nong Bua Lamphu	Nong Bua Lamphu	Panya Khamrab (34)	24 (including a fetus)	1-2	25-26	2022 Nong Bua Lamphu massacre: Panya Khamrab stormed a daycare center and attacked dozens of children and four or five staff members, including a pregnant woman. Twenty-four people died, including the pregnant staff member and her fetus, before the attacker fled.	
January 29, 2024	Bangkok	Bangkok	Unnamed perpetrator	1	0	1	A student stabbed his alleged bully to death.	
February 11, 2026	Hat Yai	Songkhla	Khema (18)	1	3 (Note: Includes the perpetrator.)	4	2026 Hat Yai school shooting: A shooting at Patongprathankiriwat School leaves one dead and three injured, including the shooter himself	
August 7, 2026	Nonthaburi	Nonthaburi	Patchata Yimruang (14)	9 (Note: Includes the perpetrator.)	23+	32+	2026 Nonthaburi shootings: A shooting at Debsirin Nonthaburi School killed at least five staff members, which ended after the shooter committed suicide. The perpetrator also killed his grandparents before the attack, who he was living with. A wounded 12-year-old girl later died in the hospital.	
September 9, 2026	Bang Lamung	Chonburi	Thassaphong Thongthach (55)	1	0	1	A teacher was shot and killed inside a kindergarten by her husband, a police officer.	

== See also ==
- List of massacres in Thailand
- List of schools in Thailand
