= Lists of school shootings in the United States =

Lists of school shootings in the United States include:

- List of school shootings in the United States (before 2000)
- List of school shootings in the United States (2000s)
- List of school shootings in the United States (2010s)
- List of school shootings in the United States (2020s)
- List of school shootings in the United States by death toll

== See also ==
- List of mass shootings in the United States
