= List of school attacks in New Zealand =

List of attacks related to schools in New Zealand

This is a chronological list of school attacks in New Zealand. The term "attack" excludes cases of accidents, police-related incidents, and suicides of one or more people.

In 2024, the Education Review Office, a public office charged with assessing the condition of schools in New Zealand, stated that violence and disrupted behavior in education had risen in the past two years. 32 percent of students who had been stood down in 2022 had been punished for physical assaults on faculty or other students.

== List ==
Date	Location	Perpetrator(s)	Dead	Injured	Total	Description
29 August 1900	Christchurch, Canterbury Region	Henry Cunningham	0	1	1	A student stabbed a teacher at Burnham Industrial School.
19 October 1923	Waikino, Waikato	John Christopher Higgins	2	6	8	Waikino school shooting: A man opened fire at a school, killing two students and wounding six others, including the headmaster and a responding police officer. He eventually surrendered to police.
18 August 1947	Auckland, Auckland Region	Unnamed	0	1	1	A 13-year-old student was stabbed during an argument at Seddon Memorial Technical College.
26 October 1977	Christchurch, Canterbury Region	Unnamed	0	1	1	A female student stabbed another girl at Aranui High School.
27 November 1989	Whanganui, Manawatū–Whanganui	Unnamed	0	1	1	A 13-year-old student at Wanganui High School was stabbed on school grounds.
16 July 1990	Auckland, Auckland Region	Pauline Janet Williamson	0	4	4	A woman stabbed four students in the playground of Kadimah College in an anti-Semitic attack.
14 November 1990	Auckland, Auckland Region	Unnamed	0	5	5	A 12-year-old student armed with an air pistol wounded five other students in the playground of Te Atatu North Primary School.
March 1992	Greytown, Wellington Region	Unnamed	0	1	1	A Kuranui College student was stabbed aboard a school bus after he allegedly bullied the victim.
3 March 2009	Auckland, Auckland Region	Tae Won Chung	0	1	1	A 17-year-old international student at Avondale College stabbed teacher Dave Warren during a lecture.
10 May 2010	Te Puke, Bay of Plenty Region	Unnamed	0	1	1	A 13-year-old student at Te Puke High School stabbed a teacher multiple times in a classroom.
10 March 2011	Auckland, Auckland Region	Two unnamed	0	2	2	A man and a teenager stabbed two other males in a car park on the campus of the Unitec Institute of Technology.
17 August 2011	Māngere, Auckland Region	Unnamed	0	1	1	A 10-year-old boy stabbed another student at Jean Batten Primary School after being tackled in a game of rugby.
24 June 2014	Māngere Bridge, Auckland Region	Unnamed	0	1	1	An 11-year-old at Pacific Christian School was stabbed in the head with scissors by another student.
6 November 2018	Invercargill, Southland Region	Unnamed	0	1	1	A 14-year-old Southland Boys' High School student stabbed another pupil with scissors.
12 June 2020	Auckland, Auckland Region	Four unnamed	0	2	2	Two students were hospitalized after a stabbing outside De La Salle College during a fight. Four teenagers were charged in connection with the incident.
16 May 2022	Wellington, Wellington Region	Unnamed	0	1	1	A 15-year-old was charged with stabbing a person at Tawa College.
5 July 2024	Wellington, Wellington Region	Unnamed	0	1	1	A Wellington Girls' College student was stabbed on campus during an altercation.
19 March 2025	Christchurch, Canterbury Region	Unnamed	0	2	2	A student with scissors stabbed two teachers at Haeata Community Campus.
23 July 2025	Greymouth, West Coast Region	Unnamed	0	1	1	A male student at Greymouth High School stabbed another student.
3 February 2026	Tauranga, Bay of Plenty Region	Unnamed	0	1	1	A student injured another boy with a pocketknife at Ōtūmoetai Intermediate School.
24 March 2026	Tuakau, Waikato	Unnamed	0	1	1	A Tuakau College student stabbed a teacher in the back and arm.
