= Casper College murders =

2012 murders in Wyoming, United States

- Location: Casper, Wyoming, U.S.
- Date: November 30, 2012
- Attack type: Patricide, double murder, murder–suicide, school attack
- Weapons: Compound bow; 2 knives
- Deaths: 3 (including the perpetrator)
- Injuries: 0
- Perpetrator: Christopher Krumm
- Motive: Retaliation for inheriting Asperger syndrome

On November 30, 2012, Christopher Krumm, 25, son of Casper College faculty member James Krumm, shot his father to death using a compound bow whilst he was teaching a class, before committing suicide by stabbing himself to death with a knife. It was later revealed he had previously murdered his father's girlfriend, Heidi Arnold, also a teacher at said college, by stabbing her to death at their residence.

== Background ==
Christopher Philip Krumm (19 December 1986 – 30 November 2012), aged 25, was the son of British-born James Philip Krumm (5 January 1956 – 30 November 2012), aged 56, a teacher at Casper College. Chris' mother, Carol Krumm, died of cancer in 2005. At the time of the attacks, James Krumm was actively dating Heidi Jeannette Arnold (10 May 1970 – 30 November 2012), aged 42, who also worked at Casper College as a math instructor.

Krumm attended Natrona County High School, located in Casper, from which he graduated in 2005. He studied electrical engineering at Colorado School of Mines. Whilst taking a class in Casper College, his calculus teacher Mickie Goodro remembered him as being one of the smartest students she'd ever had "but his social skills were not wonderful."

He was diagnosed with Asperger syndrome in high school, and claimed to have inherited the condition from his father. Allegedly, he had been gravely troubled by his condition, blaming it for the reason he could not hold stable jobs and once stating that his father should be "castrated" to prevent him from passing the condition onto others. Three years before the attacks, Krumm and his father had a falling out. James Krumm claimed that Christopher hated him, blaming for inheriting his condition.

Christopher Krumm resided in Vernon, Connecticut, and worked as an engineer. Just six weeks before the murders, in mid-October, he applied for a handgun license, which is required to possess or carry a handgun in the state of Connecticut. For unknown reasons, Christopher did not wait for his license to come through, and carried out his attack while the aforementioned paperwork was still being processed. Firearms were not used in the attack.

== Events ==
On Friday, November 30, 2012, Christopher Krumm traveled 2,000 miles from his home in Connecticut to the residence of his father and Heidi Arnold in Wyoming. Christopher stabbed Heidi several times, most of which took place outside. He then went to the college to find James. Police received the first phone call just after 9 a.m., and received a second call just minutes later. Heidi was stabbed multiple times. Authorities found signs of defensive wounds on her body. She was found barefoot and still dressed in pajamas in the street outside their home.

Christopher arrived at the college with two knives and a compound bow hidden under a blanket. He walked into his father's classroom and shot him in the head with the bow at point blank range. Despite the arrow going fully through his head, Jim rose up and attacked his son, allowing his six students to escape before any harm could come to them.

Three fellow faculty members tried to intervene in the final struggle. Christopher stabbed his father multiple times with the knives, ending his life, before stabbing himself as well, leading to his death. Paramedics arrived to find Jim already dead; although Christopher still showed signs of life, they were unable to save him.

== Aftermath ==
A bomb squad was sent to Christopher's apartment, though no hazardous materials were found. During the crime scene investigations, Arnold's body was left outside the house for multiple hours, which local police later apologized for.
