= Bang Lamung =

Bang Lamung may refer to:

- Bang Lamung District
- Bang Lamung township
