= Kelly Elementary School shooting =

2010 school shooting in California, United States

- Location: Carlsbad, California, U.S.
- Date: October 8, 2010; 16 years ago
- Target: Students and staff at Kelly Elementary School; Wealthy youth
- Attack type: School shooting
- Weapons: .357 Magnum revolver; Gas can (unused)
- Deaths: 0
- Injuries: 3 (two children from gunshot wounds, and the perpetrator was hit by a truck)
- Perpetrator: Brendan Liam O'Rourke
- Motive: Mental illness Anger towards children who come from wealthy families, possible anti-Christian sentiment

On October 8, 2010, Brendan O'Rourke, 41, jumped over a fence and opened fire with a revolver on the playground of Kelly Elementary School in Carlsbad, California; two girls, 6 and 7, were grazed in the arms. A construction worker then knocked the shooter down with his truck, and him and two others wrestled O'Rourke to the ground, thus ending the attack. In March 2012, O'Rourke was founded legally sane, and sentenced to 168 years to life in prison on multiple charges of attempted premeditated murder and assault.

== Shooting ==
O'Rourke had a .357 Magnum revolver, extra ammunition, a gas can and matches when he opened fire at the school playground where there were 230 children. He fired six rounds with the revolver, striking two second-grade girls in the arms; their injuries were treated by the hospital as to be serious, but not life-threatening. The shooter was hit by a construction worker's truck, which left him with injuries that were deemed to be non-serious. Him and two other workers wrestled O'Rourke to the ground, ending the attack.

== Motive ==
Brendan Liam O'Rourke, a Carlsbad resident, had no known connection to the school, and believed his former employer, AIG, an insurance film, had been stalking him and caused him to suffer from severe mental distress. He had personal issues with wealthy children and families.
