= List of school attacks in the Netherlands =

This chronological list of school attacks in Netherlands that occurred at K–12 public and private schools, as well as at colleges and universities, and on school buses. Excluded from this list are the following:

1. Incidents that occurred as a result of police actions.
2. Suicides or suicide attempts involving only one person.
3. Incidents during World War II.

== List ==
Date	Location	Perpetrator(s)	Dead	Injured	Total	Description
25 March 1928	Schuinesloot	Unnamed	0	0	0	G. W. Kaemingk, head of the Special School in Schuinesloot, encountered a man outside the school as Kaemingk was heading inside for a school meeting. When the man, who was apparently looking for a person who was not present, became angry and began vandalizing the school doors, Kaemingk went to intervene. The man fired a shot from a revolver, hitting a door, but striking no one. A 21-year-old suspect was detained.
23 July 1947	Sneek	Unnamed	1 (Note: Including the perpetrator or suspect)	1	2	A 19-year-old went to a domestic science school to see his fiancée. When she proposed to break off the relationship, the 19-year-old shot her with a revolver, injuring her, before committing suicide.
2 January 1960	Wageningen	Unnamed	0	1	1	A 33-year-old agricultural college student shot a teacher who he accused of failing him.
4 October 1978	Maastricht	Unnamed	0	1	1	A 17-year-old former student at Henric van Veldekecollege shot and wounded the school principal, who knocked the gun out of the shooter's hand before the teenager fled. The shooter surrendered later that day.
7 December 1999	Veghel	Ali Düzgün	0	5	5	A 17-year-old student opened fire in a computer room at ROC De Leijgraaf in an attempted honor killing, wounding a teacher and four students.
13 January 2004	The Hague	Murat Demir	1	0	1	A 16-year-old student shot and killed deputy director Hans van Wieren in the canteen of Terra College.
1 December 2006	Hoogerheide	Julien C.	1	0	1	A 22-year-old man randomly stabbed 8-year-old Jesse Dingemens to death at school.
11 October 2007	Amsterdam	Hüseyin P.	1	0	1	A 14-year-old student stabbed 16-year-old Youssef Mokhtari to death at a school in Slotervaart.
10 October 2014	Voorburg	Anthony D.	1	0	1	A 16-year-old student fatally stabbed classmate Wesley Hoek in the schoolyard at Corbulo College after being bullied.
14 September 2018	Roermond	Unnamed	0	0	0	A 16-year-old student with an air gun, knives, and an axe fired multiple shots inside and outside a school before being talked down and overpowered by teachers.
18 December 2018	Rotterdam	Bekir E.	1	0	1	A 31-year-old man shot and killed a 16-year-old girl in the bike rack that is on the grounds of the Rotterdam Faculty of Design.
28 September 2023	Rotterdam	Fouad Lakhlili	1	0	1	2023 Rotterdam shootings: After killing a mother and daughter at a residence, a 32-year-old man shot and killed a teacher at the Erasmus University Medical Center. The shooter was arrested.
30 May 2024	Eindhoven	Unnamed	0	1	1	A non-student stabbed a lecturer in a bathroom at the Fontys University of Applied Sciences.
8 May 2025	The Hague	D.D.	0	0	0	A student at The Hague University of Applied Sciences with a samurai sword entered a building and threatened staff before being tased and arrested.
19 December 2025	Amsterdam	Six unnamed	0	1	1	A student was stabbed at Mundus College. Six students were arrested in connection with the incident.
