= Casper College =

Community college in Casper, Wyoming, US

- Type: Public community college
- Established: 1945; 81 years ago
- President: Brandon Kosine
- Students: 4,682 (2023)
- Location: Casper, Wyoming, United States; 42°49′56.67″N 106°19′31.32″W
- Colors: Red and White
- Mascot: Thunderbirds
- Website: www.caspercollege.edu

Casper College is a public community college in Casper, Wyoming, United States. It is one of the largest and most comprehensive community colleges in the region. Established in 1945 as Wyoming's first junior college and initially located on the third floor of Natrona County High School, Casper College moved to its current site 10 years later. As of 2026, the campus consists of 28 buildings on more than 200 acres. The grounds are distinctive, with terraces that surround the modern buildings. It enrolls over 4,500 students and employs about 250 faculty.

== Tate Geological Museum ==
The Tate Geological Museum (labelled simply Tate Museum) is located on the south end of the campus. As a regional Earth Science Education Center, the museum is open to the public and free to visit, with a mission to provide educational resources to the community, researchers, and visitors.

== Academics ==
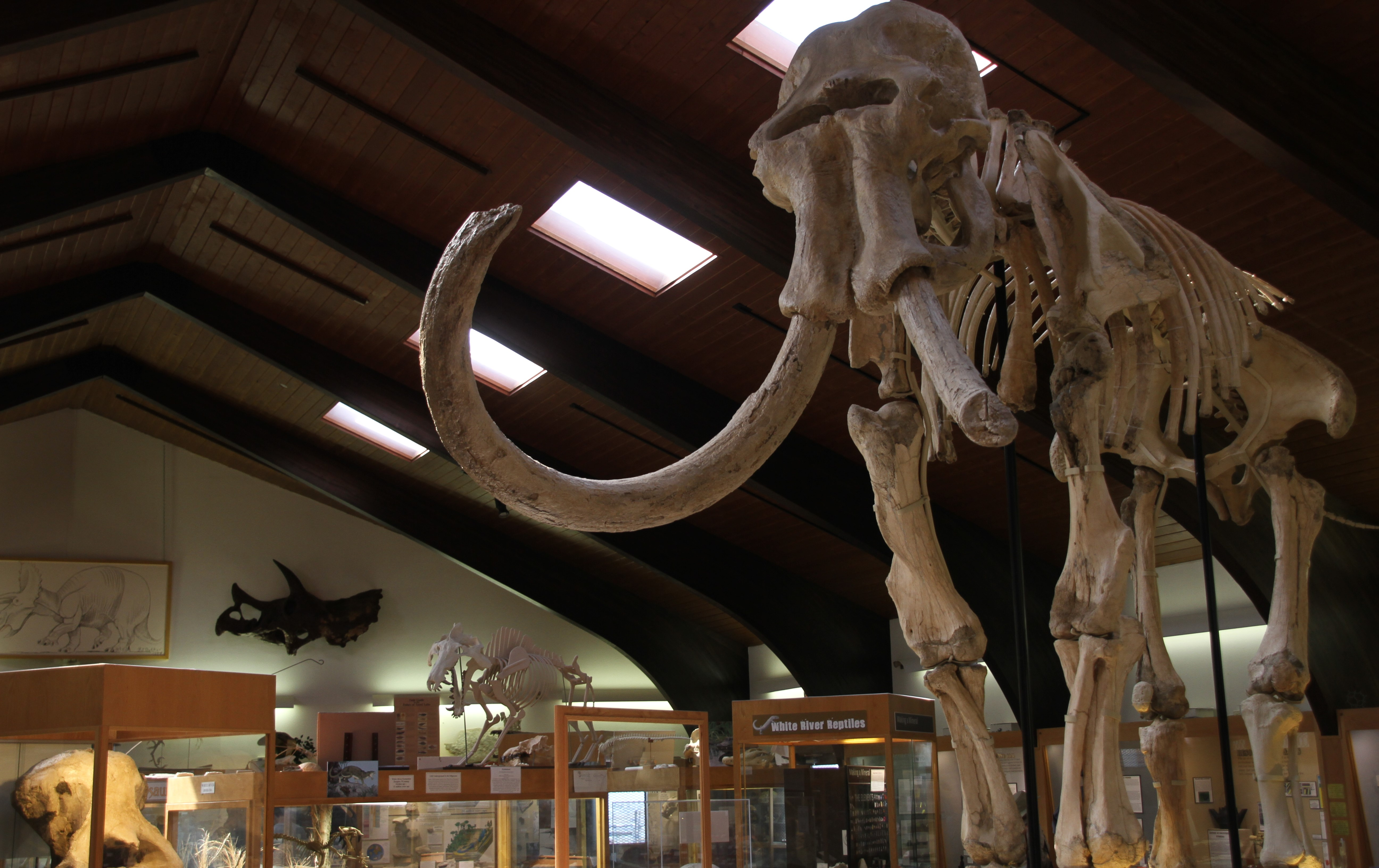
Tate Geological Museum at Casper College

Casper College offers more than 50 academic majors and 30 technical and career field options. The academic side of the college is organized into five different Schools: Business and Industry, Fine Arts and Humanities, Health Science, Science, Social and Behavioral Science.

The student Union on the University of Wyoming at Casper College

== Athletics ==
Casper College participates in the National Junior College Athletic Association in the following sports:

- Men's basketball (Thunderbirds)
- Women's basketball (Lady T-Birds)
- Rodeo
- Volleyball
- Men's soccer (added in 2020)
- Women's soccer (added in 2020)

Swede Erickson Thunderbird Gym is the home venue for Casper College men's basketball, women's basketball and volleyball.

== Notable alumni ==
- Dax, college basketball player and rapper
- Dick Cheney, former Vice President of the United States
- Earle Higgins, professional basketball player
- Bob Lackey, professional basketball player
- Chris LeDoux, Country singer and rodeo cowboy
- Flynn Robinson, professional basketball player
- Marlan Scully, physicist best known for his work in theoretical quantum optics

== See also ==
- Casper College murders
