= 2013 Spring High School stabbing =

Stabbing attack in Texas, United States

Spring High School stabbing
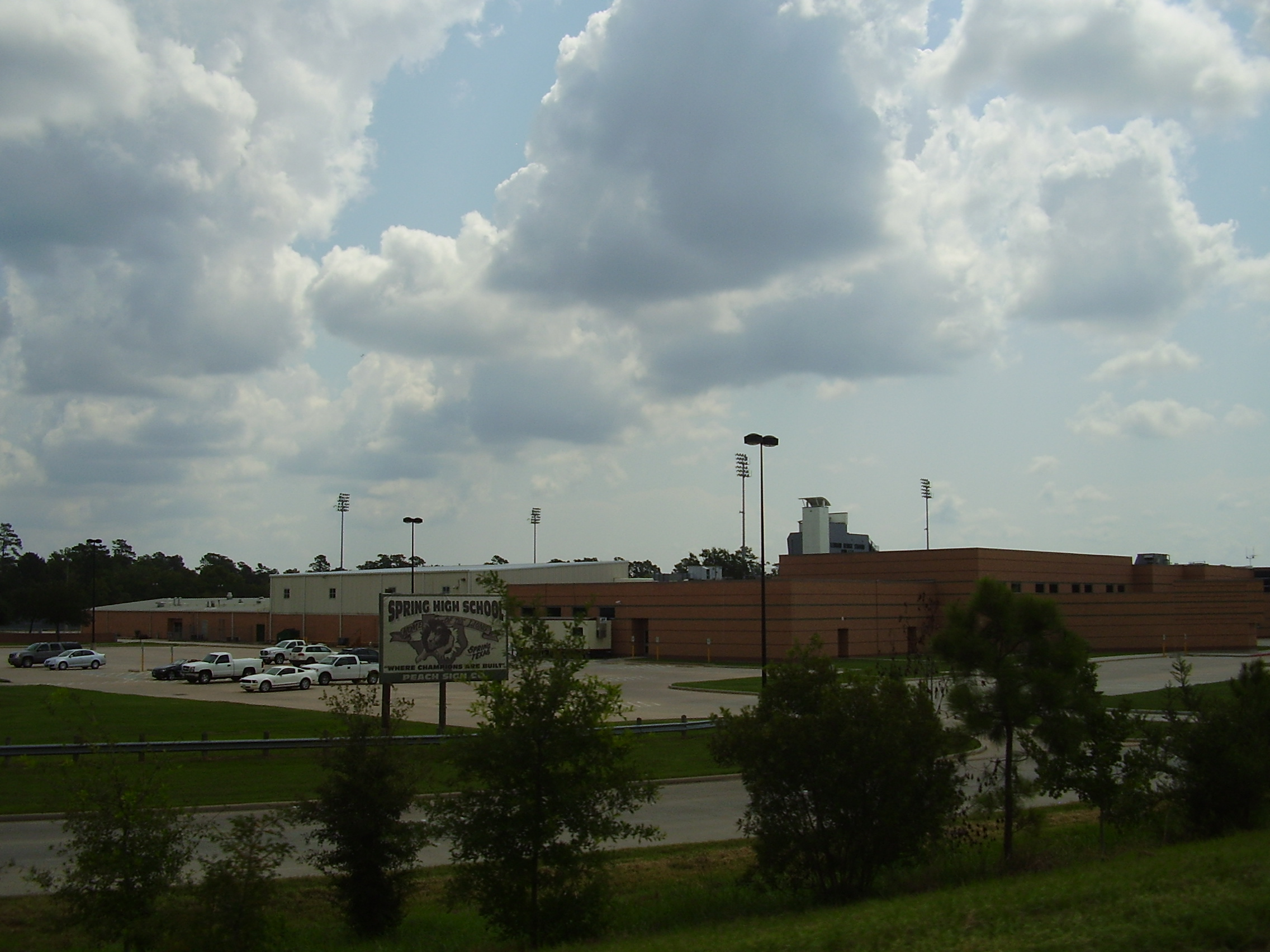
- The northwest side of the school in 2009
- Location: 30.05296°N 95.42986°W; Spring High School, Spring, Texas, United States
- Date: September 4, 2013; 13 years ago 7:10 a.m.
- Target: Students and staff at Spring High School
- Attack type: Mass stabbing, school stabbing
- Weapon: Pocket knife
- Deaths: 1 (Joshua Broussard)
- Injuries: 3
- Perpetrator: Luis Alonzo Alfaro
- Motive: Rivalry

On September 4, 2013, one student was killed and three others were wounded in a stabbing attack at Spring High School in Spring, Texas, United States. A 17-year-old student, identified as Luis Alonzo Alfaro, was arrested and charged with the murder. In September 2014, Alfaro was convicted of manslaughter and sentenced to 20 years in prison.

The stabbing raised issues of gang and racial tensions among the Spring High School community and local community leaders.

== Background ==
The stabbings took place within a context of ethnicity-related tensions between rival gangs within the student body at Spring High where, in the decade before this brawl, the white population fell from 65% to 29%. This is largely to the influx of black families from Hurricane Katrina in Louisiana relocating to the Houston area and Spring High taking many students into their school. The black population increased from about 15% to 30%, the Hispanic population has grown to 36% within that time, and students in the high school socialized within ethnic boundaries. On the morning of the 2013 stabbings, the fighting broke out in a school corridor between black students calling their group "Drama" and Hispanic students chanting "Brown Pride".

== Stabbing ==
At 7:10 a.m., in the Spring High School hallways, a physical altercation between several students escalated after Alfaro bumped his shoulder against 17-year-old Joshua Broussard, a junior at the school. During the fight, Alfaro was stated to have produced a knife and fatally stabbed Broussard to death. Three other students were also injured. Alfaro attempted to flee, but he was arrested at the school and was taken into custody after he allegedly confessed to the crime. Two other students were also taken into custody for questioning, but later released.

=== Aftermath ===
After the incident, the school was placed on lock-down. Students were dismissed from the school at around noontime. The district gave automated phone and e-mail messages to the parents of students approximately three hours after the stabbings occurred. Spring Independent School District Superintendent Ralph Draper said in a statement, "Every parent sends their child to school believing school should be one of those safe haven places. This is what we spend our nights and days working toward and what I lose sleep over. In my nearly 30-year career, this is the one thing you pray never to experience." Police suspected that the stabbing was gang-related.

=== Victims ===
The sole fatality was Joshua Broussard, who died at the scene after being stabbed multiple times in the abdomen. The three wounded victims were taken to hospitals and later discharged on the same day. 17-year-old Randall Moore and an unidentified 16-year-old student were treated for minor injuries, while 16-year-old Deavean Bazile was airlifted to a hospital in critical condition. Joshua Broussard was a victim of gang violence although he had never been in a gang.

== Charges and trial ==
The lone suspect, 17-year-old Luis Alonzo Alfaro, faced one count of murder. He admitted to stabbing four students, according to sheriff's homicide detectives. He was held on $150,000 bail.

In September 2014, Alfaro was found guilty of the lesser charge of manslaughter and was sentenced to 20 years of prison.

== Community reaction ==
The incident led to criticism on the school policy of regulating fights that occurred on-campus, as well as the delay in the school's notification of parents about the stabbing attack, which took about three hours. Superintendent Draper responded to the latter issue, stating that there was a primary focus on securing the school and ensuring that no compromissory action would be taken against the investigation before the details would be sent to parents.

On September 8, 2013, leaders of African American and Latino communities addressed issues of gang and racial tensions, which are issues that police believe may have motivated the stabbing.

== Related incident ==
During a memorial service held for Joshua Broussard on September 8, 2013, an altercation between groups of young men occurred in the Spring Baptist Church parking lot. At least eight gunshots were reported, but nobody was injured. The fight ended before law enforcement arrived to the scene. No arrests were made in connection with the incident, and it was believed to be gang-related.

== See also ==
- 2013 Lone Star College–CyFair stabbing, a stabbing attack that occurred at a community college in Texas, which left 14 people wounded
- List of school-related attacks
