= Crime in California =

Crime in California refers to crime occurring within the U.S. state of California. The principal source of law for California criminal procedure is the California Penal Code.

California has a lower murder rate than the US average.

== State statistics ==
In 2019, there were 1,096,668 crimes reported in California including 1,679 murders, 14,720 rapes and 915,197 property crimes. In 2019, there were 1,012,441 arrests of adults and 43,181 arrests of juveniles in California.

In 2014, 1,697 people were victims of homicides. 30% of homicides were gang-related, 28% were due to an unspecified argument, 9% were domestic, and 7% were robbery related. The rest were unknown. In 2017 the violent crime rate in California rose 1.5% and was 14th highest of the 50 states.

Number of crimes per 100,000 persons in 2004 (crime rates)
Violent crime rates				Property crime rates						Total	Rank
Population	Violent crime	Homicide	Rape	Robbery	Serious assault	Property crime	Burglary	Larceny	Motor vehicle theft	Total	Rank
35,893,799	551.8	6.7	26.8	172.1	346.3	3,419.0	685.1	2,030.1	703.8	11,970.8	26

=== By year ===
This table uses data from the Uniform Crime Report until 2019. Starting in 2020 it uses data from the FBI Crime Data Explorer as the UCR data is no longer published and a switchover has been done.

Year	Population	Index	Violent	Property	Murder (Note: The FBI Crime Data Explorer does not have "Murder" listed under "Crime Select" but has "Homicide" instead and "Homicide" is used in the place of Murder.)	Rape (Note: In 2014, the crime of "forcible rape" was changed to "rape." The definition was expanded to include both male and female victims and reflects the various forms of sexual penetration understood to be rape.)	Robbery	Aggravated assault	Burglary	Larceny theft	Vehicle theft (Note: "Motor Vehicle Theft" is the name of the category from the FBI Crime Database and is used in lieu starting in 2020.)
1960	15,717,204	546,069	37,558	508,511	616	2,859	18,796	18,796	143,102	311,956	53,453
1965	18,602,000	803,487	52,490	750,997	880	3,948	21,081	26,581	225,007	444,217	81,773
1970	19,953,134	1,264,854	94,741	1,170,113	1,376	7,005	45,083	45,083	349,788	682,811	137,514
1975	21,185,000	1,526,293	138,842	1,387,451	2,209	8,807	59,827	67,999	469,726	784,639	133,086
1976	21,520,000	1,556,757	144,041	1,412,716	2,220	9,614	59,318	72,889	467,980	806,086	138,650
1977	21,896,000	1,534,621	154,582	1,380,039	2,515	10,825	62,852	78,390	468,452	766,317	145,270
1978	22,294,000	1,586,483	165,626	1,420,857	2,611	11,316	68,235	83,464	488,966	777,783	154,108
1979	22,696,000	1,695,108	184,087	1,511,021	2,952	12,239	75,767	93,129	496,310	847,148	167,563
1980	23,532,680	1,264,854	210,290	1,633,042	3,411	13,693	102,766	102,766	545,138	913,070	174,834
1981	24,159,000	1,833,787	208,485	1,625,302	3,143	13,566	93,781	97,995	540,806	921,939	162,557
1982	24,724,000	1,801,256	201,429	1,599,827	2,779	12,529	91,988	94,133	499,466	935,831	164,530
1983	25,174,000	1,680,978	194,491	1,486,487	2,639	12,093	85,826	93,933	460,460	867,123	158,904
1984	25,622,000	1,657,320	195,589	1,461,731	2,717	11,702	83,924	97,246	443,094	857,328	161,309
1985	26,365,000	1,718,473	201,763	1,516,710	2,770	11,421	86,387	101,185	448,506	890,967	177,237
1986	26,981,000	1,824,669	248,370	1,576,299	3,038	12,119	92,512	140,701	457,698	913,004	205,597
1987	27,663,000	1,799,871	253,943	1,545,928	2,924	12,109	83,341	155,569	419,969	896,335	229,624
1988	28,168,000	1,869,092	261,912	1,607,180	2,936	11,780	86,141	161,055	407,631	933,636	265,913
1989	29,063,000	1,965,652	284,136	1,681,516	3,158	11,966	96,431	172,581	410,468	972,603	298,445
1990	29,760,021	1,965,237	311,051	1,654,186	3,553	12,688	182,602	182,602	400,392	951,580	302,214
1991	30,380,000	2,057,513	331,122	1,726,391	3,859	12,896	124,939	189,428	424,656	986,120	315,615
1992	30,867,000	2,061,761	345,624	1,716,137	3,921	12,761	130,897	198,045	427,491	968,534	320,112
1993	31,211,000	2,015,265	336,381	1,678,884	4,096	11,766	126,436	194,083	414,182	945,407	319,295
1994	31,431,000	1,940,497	318,395	1,622,102	3,703	10,984	112,160	191,548	384,257	929,640	308,205
1995	31,589,000	1,841,984	305,154	1,536,830	3,531	10,554	104,611	186,458	353,895	902,456	280,479
1996	31,878,000	1,660,131	274,996	1,385,135	2,916	10,244	94,222	167,614	312,212	830,457	242,466
1997	32,268,000	1,569,949	257,582	1,312,367	2,579	10,189	81,468	163,346	299,240	784,405	228,722
1998	32,667,000	1,418,674	229,883	1,188,791	2,171	9,782	68,782	149,148	269,012	724,262	195,517
1999	33,145,121	1,261,164	207,879	1,053,285	2,005	9,363	60,039	136,472	223,814	660,991	168,480
2000	33,871,648	1,266,714	210,531	1,056,183	2,079	9,785	60,249	138,418	222,293	651,855	182,035
2001	34,600,463	1,347,056	212,867	1,134,189	2,206	9,960	64,614	136,087	232,273	697,739	204,177
2002	35,001,986	1,384,872	208,388	1,176,484	2,395	10,198	64,968	130,827	238,428 (Note: In the UCR data, it reports the number of burglaries as being "238,4280" which is abnormally high and is likely a typo and due to this it is listed as simply being "238,428")	715,692	222,364
2003	35,462,712	1,420,637	205,551	1,215,086	2,407	9,994	63,770	129,380	242,272	731,486	241,326
2004	35,842,038	1,416,369	189,175	1,227,194	2,392	9,615	61,768	115,400	245,903	728,687	252,604
2005	36,154,147	1,390,710	190,178	1,200,532	2,503	9,392	63,622	114,661	250,521	692,467	257,543
2006	36,457,549	1,350,137	194,120	1,156,017	2,485	9,212	70,968	111,455	246,464	666,860	242,693
2007	36,553,213	1,299,685	191,025	1,108,660	2,260	9,013	70,542	109,210	237,025	652,243	219,392
2008	36,580,371	1,265,939	185,173	1,080,766	2,142	8,903	69,385	104,743	237,724	650,513	192,529
2009	36,961,664	1,184,367	174,934	1,009,433	1,972	8,713	64,093	100,156	230,198	615,402	163,833
2010	37,338,198	1,146,072	164,133	981,939	1,809	8,331	58,116	95,877	228,857	600,558	152,524
2011	37,683,933	1,128,765	154,943	973,822	1,792	7,665	54,291	91,195	230,075	596,905	146,842
2012	37,999,878	1,210,409	160,944	1,049,465	1,884	7,837	56,521	94,702	245,767	635,090	168,608
2013	38,431,393	1,173,646	154,739	1,018,907	1,746	7,464	53,640	89,029	232,058	621,557	165,292
2014	38,792,291	1,100,956	153,763	947,193	1,700	8,389	48,681	91,804	202,669	592,673	151,851
2015	38,993,940	1,191,797	166,883	1,024,914	1,861	9,341	52,862	99,349	197,404	656,517	170,993
2016	39,250,017	1,176,866	174,796	1,002,070	1,930	10,149	54,789	104,375	188,304	637,010	176,756
2017	39,613,045	1,173,972	178,553	986,769	1,829	14,724	56,609	105,391	176,638	641,804	168,327
2018	39,825,181	1,126,387	176,866	940,998	1,739	15,500	54,312	105,315	164,540	621,288	155,170
2019	39,959,095	1,096,668	173,205	915,197	1,679	14,720	52,050	104,756	151,596	622,869	140,732
2020	[data missing]	[data missing]	[data missing]	[data missing]	2,202	13,441	44,693	113,572	145,418	527,896	168,086
2021	[data missing]	[data missing]	[data missing]	[data missing]	391	3,057	6,730	26,239	16,022	100,571	31,839
2022	[data missing]	[data missing]	[data missing]	[data missing]	2,233	14,943	47,919	128,967	144,483	582,322	183,762
2023	[data missing]	[data missing]	[data missing]	[data missing]	1,914	14,681	49,453	135,168	134,030	567,295	198,240

== By location ==
=== Los Angeles ===
In 2010, Los Angeles reported 293 homicides. The 2010 number corresponds to a rate of 7.6 per 100,000 population. Murders in Los Angeles have decreased since the peak year of 1993, when the homicide rate was 21.1 (per 100,000 population).

== Legal procedure ==
As one of the fifty states of the United States, California follows common law criminal procedure. The principal source of law for California criminal procedure is the California Penal Code, Part 2, "Of Criminal Procedure."

Every year in California, approximately 150 thousand violent crimes and 1 million property crimes are committed. With a population of about 40 million people, approximately 1.2 million arrests are made every year in California. The California superior courts hear about 270,000 felony cases, 900,000 misdemeanor cases, and 5 million infraction cases every year. There are currently 130,000 people in state prisons and 70,000 people in county jails. Of these, there are 746 people who have been sentenced to death.

=== Policing ===
In 2018, California had 531 state and local law enforcement agencies. Those agencies employed a total of 130,451 staff. Of the total staff, 79,038 were sworn officers (defined as those with general arrest powers).

==== Police ratio ====
In 2018, California had 200 police officers per 100,000 residents.

=== Capital punishment laws ===
The death penalty (also known as capital punishment) is still legal in California, although Governor Gavin Newsom issued a moratorium on the use on March 13, 2019. The last execution was issued for Clarence Ray Allen on January 17, 2006, through lethal injection.

== Organized crime ==
Organized crime in California involves the criminal activities of organized crime groups, street gangs, criminal extremists, and terrorists in California. Traditional organized crime are in the form of Cosa Nostra (LCN), Sicilian Mafia, and Camorra. Eurasian criminal networks specialize in white-collar crime, fraud, prostitution and human trafficking. Crime cells from Southeast Asia, Latin America, and Eastern Europe impact public safety and the state's economy.

=== Gangs ===
Gangs in California are classified into three categories: criminal street gangs, prison gangs, and outlaw motorcycle gangs. Gang operations usually include "assault, auto theft, drive-by shooting, illegal drug and narcotic manufacturing, drug and narcotic trafficking, forgery, fraud, home invasion robbery, identity theft, murder, weapons trafficking, witness intimidation, and violence against law enforcement."

=== Terrorism ===
Domestic criminal extremists include various racial supremacy groups. International terrorists include Al-Qaeda, Mujahedin-e-Khalq (MEK), and Jamaat ul-Fuqra (JUF).

== Notable incidents ==
- 1846–73: California genocide—non-Natives killed between 9,492 and 16,094 California Natives
- 1856–57: The Flores Daniel Gang.
  - Juan Flores—hanged for murder
  - Pancho Daniel—lynched by a citizen mob
- 1871: Los Angeles Chinese massacre of 1871
- 1877: San Francisco riot of 1877
- 1883: Lexington murders
- 1892: John and Charles Ruggles–hanged for robbing a Wells Fargo stagecoach
- 1899: J. Ellis Rodley—convicted of perjury; sentenced to 12 years in prison
- 1905–08: San Francisco graft trials
  - Abe Ruef—the only person convicted as part of the graft trials; pleaded guilty to bribery and sentenced to 14 years in prison
- 1910: Los Angeles Times bombing
- 1913: Wheatland hop riot
- 1917: 1917 Sacramento Governor's Mansion bombing
- 1923: Japanese mission school fire
- 1927: Murder of Marion Parker
- 1937: September 1937 Folsom escape attempt
- 1940–41: Sacramento Mad Killer
- 1942: Sleepy Lagoon murder
- 1943: Zoot Suit Riots
- 1946: Battle of Alcatraz
- 1947–56: Battle of Sunset Strip
- 1947: Black Dahlia murder
- 1951: Bloody Christmas (1951)
- 1958: Killing of Johnny Stompanato
- 1965:
  - 1965 Highway 101 sniper attack
  - Watts riots
- 1966:
  - Compton's Cafeteria riot
  - Shooting of Leonard Deadwyler
  - Murder of Cheri Jo Bates
- 1966–67: Sunset Strip curfew riots
- 1967: Murders of Theodore L. Newton Jr. and George F. Azrak
- 1968–69: Zodiac Killer murders five known victims
- 1968:
  - Shooting of William Leonard
  - Assassination of Robert F. Kennedy
- 1969:
  - Tate–LaBianca murders
  - Killing of Meredith Hunter
- 1970:
  - Newhall incident
  - Deaths of Guillermo Sanchez and Guillardo Sanchez
  - Marin County Civic Center attacks
- 1971–83: Randy Kraft sentenced to death for 16 counts of murder; suspected of killing as many as 61 people
- 1971: 1971 L.A. federal building bombing
- 1972: United California Bank burglary
- 1973–74: Zebra murders
- 1973: Assassination of Marcus Foster
- 1974:
  - Kidnapping of Patty Hearst
  - Assassination of William Cann
  - 1974 Los Angeles International Airport bombing
  - Murder of Arlis Perry
  - Murder of Betty Van Patter
- 1975: Assassination attempts of Gerald Ford in Sacramento and in San Francisco
- 1976:
  - California State University, Fullerton, massacre
  - Gypsy Hill killings
  - 1976 Chowchilla kidnapping
  - Andrew J. Hinshaw—indicted on charges of bribery, embezzlement and misappropriation of public funds while serving as Orange County assessor. Convicted of bribery and sentenced to two concurrent 1‐to‐14 years terms in prison
- 1977:
  - Kidnapping of Colleen Stan
  - Ventura Strangler
  - Golden Dragon massacre
  - Murder of Mary Quigley
- 1977–78: Hillside Strangler
- 1978:
  - Oxnard Klan Riot of 1978
  - Moscone–Milk assassinations
- 1978–79: Skid Row Stabber
- 1979:
  - Cleveland Elementary School shooting (San Diego)
  - White Night riots
- 1980:
  - Norco shootout
  - Murder of Suzanne Bombardier
  - Death of Susan Louise Jordan
- 1981:
  - Keddie murders
  - Wonderland murders
- 1984:
  - Killing of Marvin Gaye
  - Murder of Kirsten Costas
  - San Ysidro McDonald's massacre
  - Killing of Bibi Lee
- 1985:
  - Murder of Michele Avila
  - Murder of Alex Odeh
- 1986:
  - Murder of Sherri Rasmussen
  - 1986 San Francisco fireworks disaster
  - Murder of Cara Knott
- 1986–88: Bribery and Special Interest (BRISPEC) sting operation—led to the conviction and imprisonment of 12 public officials in the California State Legislature. Elected officials convicted were:
  - Paul Carpenter: sentenced to seven years for conspiracy, mail fraud and obstruction of justice
  - Frank Hill: sentenced to 46 months for extortion, money laundering and conspiracy
  - Joseph B. Montoya: served five years for extortion, money laundering, and racketeering
  - Pat Nolan: sentenced to 33 months for racketeering
  - Alan Robbins: sentenced to five years for racketeering and income tax evasion
- 1987: Hijacking of Pacific Southwest Airlines Flight 1771
- 1988:
  - Murder of Karen Toshima
  - Sunnyvale ESL shooting
  - Dan Montecalvo case
  - Kidnapping of Amber Swartz-Garcia
  - Disappearance of Michaela Garecht
- 1989: Cleveland Elementary School shooting (Stockton)
- 1991–2009: Kidnapping of Jaycee Dugard
- 1991:
  - Beating of Rodney King
  - Killing of Latasha Harlins
  - 1991 Sacramento hostage crisis
- 1992:
  - 1992 Coachella shooting
  - 1992 Los Angeles riots
  - Lindhurst High School shooting
  - Killing of Donald Scott
  - Murder of Stuart Tay
- 1993:
  - Harbor City serial shootings
  - Columbia Park gang shooting
  - 101 California Street shooting
  - Murder of Polly Klaas
  - Murder of Lea Mek
- 1994: O. J. Simpson murder case
- 1995:
  - Murder of Kelly Jamerson
  - 1995 San Diego tank rampage
  - Murder of Stephanie Kuhen
  - Walter R. Tucker III—convicted on seven counts of extortion and two counts of tax evasion; sentenced to 27 months in prison
- 1996:
  - Han twins murder conspiracy
  - Murder of Kristin Smart
  - Murder of Elyse Pahler
  - 1996 San Diego State University shooting
  - Lyle and Erik Menendez—sentenced to life in prison without parole for murdering their parents
- 1997–2005: Black Widow Murders
- 1997:
  - Murder of Ennis Cosby
  - North Hollywood shootout
  - Murder of the Notorious B.I.G.
  - Dunbar Armored robbery
- 1997–98: Rampart scandal
- 1999:
  - Costa Mesa school car attack
  - Sacramento synagogue firebombings
  - Murders of Gary Matson and Winfield Mowder
  - Los Angeles Jewish Community Center shooting
- 2000:
  - 2000 LAX bombing plot
  - Murder of Michelle O'Keefe
- 2001:
  - 2001 Isla Vista killings
  - 2001 Nevada County shootings
  - 2001 Jewish Defense League plot in California
  - Santana High School shooting
  - Stevenson Ranch shootout
- 2002:
  - 2002 Los Angeles International Airport shooting
  - Murder of Gwen Araujo
  - Murder of Laci Peterson
- 2003:
  - Murder of Lana Clarkson
  - Shooting of Deandre Brunston
  - Santa Monica Farmers Market crash
  - Murder of Yetunde Price
- 2004:
  - 2004 Jenner, California, double murder
  - Murders of Thomas and Jackie Hawks
  - Albert T. Robles—convicted of 30 counts of bribery, money laundering, and depriving the electorate; sentenced to 10 years and ordered to pay $639,000 restitution
- 2005: Randall Harold Cunningham—pleaded guilty to tax evasion, conspiracy to commit bribery, mail fraud and wire fraud; sentenced to 100 months. Conditionally pardoned in 2021
- 2006:
  - Goleta postal facility shootings
  - Paul Richards—sentenced to 16 years in federal prison on bribery and kickback charges
- 2007:
  - 2007 MacArthur Park rallies Incident
  - Hawthorne High School gang violence
  - Murder of Chauncey Bailey
  - 2007 De Anza College rape investigation
- 2008:
  - Murder of Larry King
  - Ed Jew—found guilty of extortion, bribery, and perjury
  - Murder of Jamiel Shaw II
  - Murder of the Bologna family
  - Murders of Jan Pietrzak and Quiana Jenkins-Pietrzak
  - SiPort shooting
  - Covina massacre
- 2009:
  - Shooting of Oscar Grant
  - Murder of Sandra Cantu
  - 2009 shootings of Oakland police officers
  - 2009 Richmond High School gang rape
- 2010:
  - Murder of Lydia Schatz
  - Oakland freeway shootout
  - Killing of Douglas Zerby
- 2011:
  - Murder of Jeff Hall
  - Murder of Michelle Le
  - Killing of Kelly Thomas
  - South East High School Stabbing incident
  - 2011 Seal Beach shooting
  - Southern California Edison shooting
- 2011–12 Los Angeles arson attacks
- 2012:
  - Lei family murders
  - 2012 Oikos University shooting
  - Murders of Ming Qu and Ying Wu
  - 2012 Anaheim, California police shooting and protests
  - Fresno meat plant shooting
- 2013:
  - Taft Union High School shooting
  - Christopher Dorner shootings and manhunt
  - 2013 shooting of Santa Cruz police officers
  - Murders of Claudia Maupin and Oliver Northup
  - Murder of Gabriel Fernandez
  - 2013 Santa Monica shootings
  - Kidnapping of Hannah Anderson
  - Killing of Andy Lopez
  - 2013 Los Angeles International Airport shooting
  - Shooting of Ricardo Diaz Zeferino
  - Bob Filner—pleaded guilty to charges of false imprisonment and battery.
- 2013–14: Interstate 80 rapist
- 2014–16: San Francisco Police Department text message scandal
- 2014:
  - 2014 Stockton bank robbery
  - Killing of Ezell Ford
  - Leland Yee—corruption and arms trafficking
  - Killing of Alex Nieto
  - 2014 Isla Vista killings
- 2015:
  - 2015 San Bernardino attack
  - Killing of Meagan Hockaday
  - Killing of Charley Leundeu Keunang
  - Murder of Madyson Middleton
  - Shooting of Kate Steinle
  - Matthew Muller sentenced to 31 and 40 years in prison after pleading guilty and no contest to charges of kidnapping, burglary, forcible rape, battery, assault, and false imprisonment.
- 2016:
  - Orange County Men's Central Jail escape
  - 2016 UCLA shooting
  - Killing of Joseph Mann
- 2017:
  - 2017 North Park Elementary School shooting
  - 2017 Fresno shootings
  - San Francisco UPS shooting
  - Rancho Tehama shootings
- 2017-19: Ed Buck—sentenced to 30 years in prison on 9 federal counts including providing fatal doses of methamphetamine to two men
- 2018:
  - Murder of Nia Wilson
  - Murder of Blaze Bernstein
  - Killing of Stephon Clark
  - Hart family murders
  - Yountville shooting
  - Murder of Anthony Avalos
  - Thousand Oaks shooting
  - Tulare County shootings
- 2019:
  - Poway synagogue shooting
  - Gilroy Garlic Festival shooting
  - Orinda shooting
  - 2019 Saugus High School shooting
  - 2019 Fresno shooting
  - Union City, California elementary school double murder
  - Normandie Burgos—sentenced to 255 years in prison on 60 counts of child molestation, including forcible sodomy and lewd conduct upon minors
- 2020–24: San Francisco Department of Public Works corruption scandal
- 2020:
  - 2020 boogaloo murders
  - Killing of Sean Monterrosa
  - Killing of Andres Guardado
  - Murder of Patricia Alatorre
  - Killing of Dijon Kizzee
  - Aguanga shooting
  - 2020 shooting of Los Angeles police officers
  - Anthony Levandowski—pleaded guilty to one count of trade secret theft. Pardoned in 2020.
  - José Huizar—pleaded guilty to charges of racketeering and tax evasion; sentenced to 13 years in prison and ordered to pay $443,905 in restitution to the City of Los Angeles and $38,792 in restitution to the Internal Revenue Service
- 2021–22: Stockton serial shootings
- 2021:
  - Killing of Vicha Ratanapakdee
  - 2021 Orange, California office shooting
  - 2021 San Jose shooting
  - Mitchell Englander–sentenced to 14 months in prison, three years of supervised release and a $15,000 fine after pleading guilty to falsifying material facts during interviews with federal investigators who were conducting a corruption probe at Los Angeles City Council
  - Torrance Police Department text message scandal
- 2022:
  - Murder of Brianna Kupfer
  - 2022 Sacramento shooting
  - 2022 Laguna Woods shooting
  - 2022 Brink's theft—$8.7–100 million worth of jewelry stolen from the back of a Brink's truck parked at a truck stop off I-5 near Lebec.
  - Killing of Rob Marquise Adams
  - Killing of Savannah Graziano
  - 2022 Oakland school shooting
  - Attack on Paul Pelosi
  - Elizabeth Holmes—found guilty of three counts of wire fraud, and one of conspiracy to commit wire fraud
  - Ramesh "Sunny" Balwani—found guilty of nine counts of wire fraud and two counts of conspiracy to commit wire fraud
  - Michael Avenatti—sentenced to 14 years in prison and ordered to pay nearly $11 million in restitution for embezzlement and fraud
- 2023:
  - 2023 Goshen shooting
  - 2023 Monterey Park shooting
  - 2023 Half Moon Bay shootings
  - 2023 Trabuco Canyon shooting
  - Harry Sidhu—pleaded guilty to one count of obstruction of justice, one count of wire fraud, and two counts of making false statements to the Federal Bureau of Investigation and the Federal Aviation Administration
  - Michelle and Kenneth Mack—sentenced to five years in prison for organized retail theft and conspiracy to commit organized retail theft
- 2024:
  - Easter Sunday heist
  - Alleged Assassination attempt on Donald Trump at a rally in Coachella
  - 2024 Santa Monica College shooting
  - Irma Olguin Jr. and Jake Soberal, co-founders and co-CEOs of Bitwise Industries plead guilty to wire fraud
  - Jorge Armando Contreras—sentenced to 70 months in federal prison for embezzlement
  - Leonard Glenn Francis ("Fat Leonard")—sentenced to 15 years in prison for bribery, fraud, and failure to appear in court
  - Ex-Congressman TJ Cox pleaded guilty to two fraud counts and agreed to pay up to $3.5 million in restitution
- 2025:
  - David Misch—sentenced to two 25-years-to-life terms in prison for the 1986 murders of Michelle Xavier and Jennifer Duey; following an earlier life sentence for the murder of Margaret Ball.
  - Ippei Mizuhara—sentenced to 57 months in federal prison and ordered to pay $17 million in restitution to Shohei Ohtani after pleading guilty to bank fraud and submitting a false tax return.
  - Thomas Girardi—sentenced to 87 months in prison, fined $35,000 and ordered to pay restitution of $2.3 million for wire fraud and embezzlement
  - Andrew Do—sentenced to five years in federal prison after pleading guilty to conspiracy to commit bribery.
  - 2025 Palm Springs fertility clinic bombing
  - Dan Serafini—found guilty of murder, attempted murder, and first-degree burglary
  - GirlsDoPorn
    - Michael James Pratt sentenced to 27 years in prison after pleading guilty to sex trafficking and conspiracy to commit the same crime
    - Matthew Isaac Wolfe sentenced to 14 years in prison after pleading guilty to conspiracy to commit sex trafficking
    - Ruben Andre Garcia sentenced to 20 years in prison after pleading guilty to conspiracy to commit sex trafficking
    - Theodore Gyi sentenced to four years in prison after pleading guilty to conspiracy to commit sex trafficking
  - 2025 Stockton shooting
  - Killing of Rob and Michele Reiner

== See also ==
- California locations by crime rate
- San Francisco crime family
- San Jose crime family
- Los Angeles crime family

General:

- Crime in the United States
- Criminal procedure in California
