= Alatorre =

Alatorre is a surname. Notable people with the surname include:

- Antonio Alatorre (1922–2010), Mexican writer, philologist and translator
- Gloria Rubio y Alatorre or Gloria Guinness (1912–1980)
- Javier Alatorre (born 1963), Mexican journalist
- Marcelo Alatorre (born 1985), Mexican football defender
- Patricia Alatorre (2007–2020), teenager murdered in California
- Richard Alatorre (1943–2024), member of the California State Assembly from 1973 to 1985

== See also ==
- Vega de Alatorre, municipality in the State of Veracruz, about 60 km from state capital Xalapa
- Aladore
- Alatri
- Alatyr (disambiguation)
- La Torre

Alatorre also comes from Spain and it also means that "At the tower" in ancestry.
