= Alatyr =

Alatyr may refer to:

- Alatyr (mythology), a rock in the middle of the world in Russian mythology
- Alatyr (river), a river in the Republic of Mordovia, Russia
- Alatyr, Chuvash Republic, a town in Russia
- Alatyr, Nizhny Novgorod Oblast, a village in Russia
- ALATYR, a French company, one of three customer payloads on KID (spacecraft)

== See also ==
- Alatyr (inhabited locality), a list of inhabited localities in Russia
- Alatyrsky District
