= List of killings by law enforcement officers in the United States, 2003 =

This is a list of people reported killed by non-military law enforcement officers in the United States in 2003, whether in the line of duty or not, and regardless of reason or method. The listing documents the occurrence of a death, making no implications regarding wrongdoing or justification on the part of the person killed or officer involved. Killings are arranged by date of the incident that caused death. Different death dates, if known, are noted in the description. The table below lists 145 people.

== 2003 ==
Date	Name (age) of deceased	Race	State (city)	Description
2003-12-31	David R.A. Scaringe (24)	White	New York (Albany)	Killed by bullets meant for a drunk driver. The bullets also injured a bystander.
2003-12-29	Justin Coates (23)	Black	Indiana (Indianapolis)	
2003-12-28	Diane Clough (42)	Race unspecified	New Jersey (Vineland)	
2003-12-27	Jonathan Ray Comick		Texas (Houston)	
2003-12-25	Armando Alvarado (28)	Hispanic/Latino	California (Hawthorne)	
2003-12-23	Darnell Lester (26)	Race unspecified	Ohio (Cleveland)	
2003-12-15	Kevin L. Lunsford (25)		Texas (Houston)	
2003‑12‑12	Kenneth Walker		Georgia (Columbus)	Shot during traffic stop on suspicion of drug possession.
2003-11-21	Eli Eloy Escobar II (14)	Hispanic	Texas (Houston)	
2003-11-18	Charlie E. Brown (47)		Texas (Houston)	
2003-11-15	Desean Cathcart (26)		New York (Brooklyn)	
2003-11-14	Stanley Strnad (26)		Ohio (Cleveland)	
2003-11-13	Alan Hoyos (18)	Hispanic/Latino	California (Lynwood)	
2003-11-13	Maximino Reyes (26)	Hispanic/Latino	California (Compton)	
2003-11-03	Russell Wimbush (43)		New York (Staten Island)	
2023-10-31	Jose D. Vargas Jr. (15)	Hispanic	Texas (Houston)	
2003-10-29	Renardo Powell (26)		New York (Brooklyn)	
2003-10-24	Piarre Reed		California (Meiners Oaks)	Shot in the head by a SWAT team sniper outside of his home. Police allege that Reed was armed, but no weapons were found.
2003‑10‑11	Billye Venable		California (San Diego)	Shot in the head while allegedly resisting arrest.
2003-10-11	Douglas Keith Smith (38)	White	California (Culver City)	
2003-09-19	Stephen Seignious (37)		New York (Bronx)	
2003-09-10	Steven Hanson (25)		Maine (Gray)	
2003-09-08	Gralynn K. Guillory (20)	Black	Texas (Houston)	
2003-09-02	Mary J. Beasley		Texas (Houston)	
2003-08-28	Shelvin Rowmane Williams (22)	Black	Texas (Houston)	
2003-08-27	Salvador Tapia (36)		Illinois (Chicago)	Tapia entered his workplace and shot and killed six co-workers. He was killed during an exchange of gunfire with police officers.
2003-08-24	Deandre Brunston		California (Compton)	Shooting of Deandre Brunston
2003-08-17	Karl B. Koch (24)		Texas (Houston)	
2003-08-13	Jimmie Jones (38)		Ohio (Cleveland)	
2003-08-08	Melvin Sylvester (65)		New York (Manhattan)	Shot when he did not drop the knife he was holding.
2003-08-05	Denise Washington (30)		Colorado (Aurora)	Washington was shot when she struck a policeman with a candlestick. She was off her mental illness meds.
2003-07-31	Terence Raibon (25)	Black	Texas (Tyler)	
2003-07-30	Anthony Minner (22)	Black	Nevada (Las Vegas)	
2003-07-30	Michael A. Newkirk (20)	Black	New Jersey (Newark)	Newark police officers responding to complaints of noise and public drinking at a North Ward barbecue. Police say Newkirk pointed a gun at officers, but family members say he was holding only a liquor bottle.
2003-07-29	Kyle Banks (25)		Ohio (Cleveland)	
2003-07-29	Daniel Bucci (19)	White	Ohio (Mayfield Heights)	
2003-07-28	David Alan Buchanan (35)	Race unspecified	North Carolina (Lillington)	
2003-07-28	Robert Duke (45)	Race unspecified	Florida (Gainesville)	
2003-07-28	Christopher Skwierc (18)	White	Florida (West Palm Beach)	
2003-07-27	Franciso Antonio Perez (22)	Hispanic/Latino	Maryland (Middle River)	
2003-07-26	Sammie Robinson (43)	Race unspecified	Illinois (Chicago)	
2003-07-25	Glennel Givens Jr. (28)	Black	California (Berkeley)	
2003-07-25	Julio Cesar Contreras (39)	Hispanic/Latino	Wisconsin (Madison)	
2003-07-24	Lennon Christopher "Chris" Johnson (27)	Race unspecified	Texas (Austin)	
2003-07-24	Tony Vernon (38)	Black	Texas (Dallas)	
2003-07-24	Terrance Devonny Griffin (30)	Black	Michigan (Detroit)	
2003-07-23	Othniel Askew (31)	Black	New York (Manhattan)	Shot and killed after he assassinated councilman James E. Davis.
2003-07-22	Michael John Sommers (31)	White	Michigan (Warren)	
2003-07-21	Eric Hudson (38)	Race unspecified	Alabama (Eufaula)	
2003-07-21	Eric Quick (31)	White	New Jersey (Bellmawr)	
2003-07-21	Willie Floyd Bailey (78)	Race unspecified	Alabama (Seale)	
2003-07-20	Brian R Swotek (30)	White	Nebraska (Omaha)	
2003-07-20	Jennifer L. Shepherd (31)	Race unspecified	Wisconsin (Turtle Lake)	
2003-07-20	Jose Antonio Rivera Robles	Hispanic	Puerto Rico (San Juan)	Two officers punched and kicked Rivera Robles while arresting him, resulting in his death. In 2009 the officers were convicted and sentenced to 10 and six and a half years in prison, respectively.
2003-07-19	David Sandoval Jr. (37)	Race unspecified	California (Merced)	An officer shot and killed David Sandoval Jr. when Sandoval allegedly became "aggressive" with the officer while wielding a pointed corn-dog stick during a domestic disturbance call.
2003-07-19	Michael Earl Crispin (28)	Race unspecified	Wisconsin (Onalaska)	
2003-07-18	James Paul Faulkner Jr. (54)	Race unspecified	Georgia (LaFayette)	
2003-07-18	Dennis G. Colombo Jr. (28)	White	Florida (Palm Beach Gardens)	
2003-07-17	Roy Lee White (52)	White	Oklahoma (Tishomingo)	
2003-07-16	Oscar Curtis Tilghman (44)	White	California (Fresno)	
2003-07-16	James Russell Leake (29)	Race unspecified	West Virginia (Falls Mill)	
2003-07-16	Maurice Cook (28)	Black	California (Mead Valley)	
2003-07-15	James Dwight Jr. (26)	Race unspecified	Florida (Jacksonville)	
2003-07-14	Joan McHugh (47)	Race unspecified	New York (Roslyn Heights)	Killed by her NYPD boyfriend, who then killed himself.
2003-07-13	Cau Bich Tran (25)	Asian/Pacific Islander	California (San Jose)	
2003-07-12	Chad E. Seymour (26)	White	Missouri (Kansas City)	
2003-07-12	Ralph "Steven" Burke (55)	Race unspecified	Arkansas (Elkins)	
2003-07-11	William Phillip Kellogg (21)	White	Texas (Roscoe)	
2003-07-09	Duc Minh Pham (34)	Asian/Pacific Islander	New Mexico (Albuquerque)	
2003-07-08	Randall N. Vergari (47)	Race unspecified	Illinois (Collinsville)	
2003-07-08	Sa'id Yusuf AKA Luke Rapp	Race unspecified	Idaho (Genesee)	
2003-07-07	Scott Allen Woodring (40)	White	Michigan (Fremont)	
2003-07-07	Anthony Brown (28)	White	New York (Buffalo)	
2003-07-06	Damien W. Morton (22)	Black	Nevada (Las Vegas)	
2003-07-06	Corey Graham (33)	Race unspecified	New Jersey (Camden)	
2003-07-06	Merrill Patten (38)	White	Vermont (Vergennes)	
2003-07-06	Mark Carlisle (22)	White	Indiana (Evansville)	
2003-07-06	Jermaine Timothy Simmons (21)	Race unspecified	South Carolina (Charleston)	
2003-07-05	Paul Nash Childs (15)	Black	Colorado (Denver)	
2003-07-05	Mark Armstead (31)	Black	Pennsylvania (Philadelphia)	
2003-07-03	Lonnie James Jefferson (25)	Race unspecified	Texas (Lufkin)	
2003-07-03	Claid Drew Bales (51)	White	Oklahoma (Meeker)	
2003-07-02	Juan Alberto Negron Gonzalez aka Ruddy Lora (23)	Hispanic/Latino	Connecticut (Hartford)	
2003-07-02	Jorge Sanchez-Mendoza (23)	Hispanic/Latino	California (Paso Robles)	
2003-07-01	Aaron Tackett (57)	White	Kentucky (Prestonsburg)	
2003-07-01	Efrain Cuenca Dimas (16)	Hispanic/Latino	Nevada (Las Vegas)	
2003-06-29	Sandra Wilson		Florida (North Miami Beach)	Shot by her police officer boyfriend on the same force. The boyfriend then killed himself.
2003-06-24	Harold McCord (36)		Washington (Monroe)	
2003-06-18	Calvin Washington (41)		New York (Brooklyn)	Died from a heart attack after his house was raided without warning.
2003-06-01	Unnamed man (33)		Texas (Dallas)	
2003-05-22	Ousmane Zongo		New York	Ousmane Zongo
2003-05-16	Alberta Spruill		Harlem (New York)	Died of heart failure due to the use of stun grenades when police raided the wrong apartment looking for drugs after a tip from an unreliable informant
2003-05-11	Steven M. Williams (26)	White	Utah (Herriman)	
2003-05-06	Christopher Pullen (36)		Maine (Poland)	
2003-05-05	Kendra James		Oregon (Portland)	Shot as a passenger in a car while trying to flee a traffic stop.
2003-05-04	Johnny J. Roth III (23)		Texas (Houston)	
2003-05-02	Gregory Herring		Colorado (Colorado Springs)	Died of "sudden cardiovascular collapse" during struggle with police. The police were responding to report of a naked and bleeding man in apartment parking lot who was yelling and banging on doors. City settled for $19,500 with Herring estate.
2003‑05‑01	Carlos Lopez (19)		New York (Brooklyn)	Lopez had allegedly just shot and killed a man and left in a van. Officers pulled him over & shot and killed him when he turned toward them.
2003‑04‑30	Floyd Quinones (28)		New York (Brooklyn)	Shot and killed after he fired 17 shots into the air to mark a friend's birthday.
2003‑04‑26	Charquissa Johnson (23)		Washington DC	Johnson was shot after she was ordered to drop the gun she was holding. But witnesses say Johnson was unarmed and had her hands raised when she was shot.
2003-04-26	Crystal Brame		Washington (Tacoma)	Wife of Tacoma Chief of Police David Brame, killed by her husband in a murder-suicide two months after she filed for divorce citing a long history of domestic abuse.
2003-04-23	Unnamed man (36)		Texas (Dallas)	
2003‑04‑16	Etzel Faulkner (43)		New York (Queens)	Shot and killed when he pulled out a pellet gun.
2003-03-31	Juan Lozano Jr. (31)	Hispanic	Texas (Houston)	
2003‑03‑24	Odell Smith (23)		Washington DC	Smith was killed when he allegedly turned around and pointed a gun at officers during a foot pursuit.
2003-03-18	Dale Pelletier (33)		Maine (Acton)	
2003-03-18	Unnamed man (36)		Texas (Dallas)	
2003-03-08	Michael Pleasance		Illinois (Chicago)	Shot in a subway terminal. An officer had broken up a fight involving another man and Pleasance was standing nearby when the officer shot him in the head. Pleasance's family was awarded $3 million for his death. The officer was suspended for 30 days and later promoted.
2003-03-02	Justin Fields		Wisconsin (Milwaukee)	
2003-02-24	Billy Dewayne Copeland (26)	Race unspecified	Alabama (Birmingham)	
2003-02-23	Ronnie James Chavez (22)	Hispanic/Latino	California (El Monte)	
2003-02-22	Demetrius Swift (21)	Black	California (Rialto)	
2003-02-22	Victor Martinez (27)	Hispanic/Latino	Pennsylvania (Lancaster)	
2003-02-20	Anthony Molette (25)	Black	Louisiana (Alexandria)	
2003-02-19	Thu Van Tran (48)	Asian or Pacific Islander	California (Garden Grove)	
2003-02-19	Michael Moll (18)	White	California (San Francisco)	
2003-02-18	Erick G. Causton (23)	Race unspecified	Arizona (Chandler)	
2003-02-18	Derrick Lamar Jenkins (34)	Black	California (Los Angeles)	
2003-02-16	Christopher St. Louis (18)	White	California (Santee)	
2003-02-15	Purnell "Rick" Cauley (35)	Race unspecified	Texas (Houston)	
2003‑02‑09	Jason Kanally (26)		New York (Lockport)	
2003-02-08	Fidencio Diaz Ramirez	Hispanic	Texas (Houston)	
2003-02-06	Willie B. Greene Jr. (39)	Black	Texas (Houston)	
2003‑02-05	Daniel Woodyard (34)		California (San Diego)	Woodyard was shot several times in the back by two SDPD officers. The shooting which occurred in a densely populated neighborhood, was witnessed by many community members. One community member asked to hold Danny as he lay bleeding from multiple gun shoot wounds. The request was denied. He died at the scene. A 500-person protest followed soon after this shooting. A month later the San Diego DA and Chief of Police released a report calling the shooting "justified".
2003-02-03	Joseph Bauschek		Wisconsin (Milwaukee)	
2003-02-02	Eric Estuardo Morales (26)	Hispanic	Texas (Houston)	
2003-02-02	Stanley Bates		Georgia (DeKalb County)	Shot after lunging at police with knife. Police were responding to report of a man attempting to enter his mother's home by force. The officer involved later lost a $7 million civil judgment in federal court for wrongful death in the incident.
2003-01-23	Jelani Manigault (24)	Black	New Jersey	Shot after lunging at police with a knife following a home invasion, during which he had stabbed the occupant. An excessive force claim was denied by a district court, and the appeal was rejected in 2009.
2003-01-09	Michael Ciacchi (38)		Cleveland (Ohio)	
2003-01-05	Truyen The Pham (23)	Asian	Texas (Houston)	
2003-01-05	Don Charles Eisfeld (37)	White	Oregon (Forest Grove)	
2003-01-05	James E. McNeal Jr. (29)	Race unspecified	Kansas (Kansas City)	
2003-01-05	Ronald Quaderer Jr. (24)	Native American/Alaskan	Wisconsin (New Post)	
2003-01-04	Robert Lee (57)	Race unspecified	Mississippi (Hermanville)	
2003-01-04	Casey Gordon Porter (30)	White	Alaska (Sterling)	
2003‑01‑04	Ana Lucia Rodriguez (63)	Hispanic/Latino	New York (Brooklyn)	Hit and killed by a speeding officer.
2003-01-03	Carlos Cabrera (32)	Hispanic	Texas (Houston)	
2003‑01‑02	John Lagattuta (35)	White	New York (Brooklyn)	
2003-01-02	Qing Chang (25)	Asian/Pacific Islander	Illinois (Forest Park)	
2003‑01‑01	Anthony Reid (21)	Black	New York (Brooklyn)	
2003‑01‑01	Jamal Nixon (19)	White	New York (Brooklyn)	
2003‑01‑01	Allen Newsome (17)	Black	New York City	
2003-01-01	Jesse Hernandez (22)	Hispanic/Latino	California (Los Angeles)	
2003-01-01	Erin Eckford (26)	Black	Arkansas (Little Rock)	
2003-01-01	Name withheld by police	Race unspecified	Georgia (College Park)	

== See also ==
- Death in custody § United States
- Henry A. Wallace Police Crime Public Database
- List of cases of police brutality
- List of countries with annual rates and counts for killings by law enforcement officers
- List of law enforcement officers killed in the line of duty in the United States
- List of law enforcement officers convicted for an on-duty killing in the United States
- List of shootings by US immigration agents
- List of police reforms related to the George Floyd protests
- List of unarmed African Americans killed by law enforcement officers in the United States
- Lists of killings by law enforcement officers
- Police brutality in the United States
- Police misconduct § United States
- Police riot § United States
- Police use of deadly force in the United States
