= Murder of Brianna Kupfer =

2022 stabbing murder of a university student in Los Angeles, California

- Publicity photo of Brianna Kupfer
- Location: 34.0772°N 118.3437°W; 326 North La Brea Avenue, Hancock Park, Los Angeles, California, U.S
- Date: January 13, 2022; 1:36—1:50 p.m. (GMT-7)
- Attack type: Crime of opportunity, murder by stabbing
- Weapon: Knife
- Victim: Brianna Kupfer
- Perpetrator: Shawn Laval Smith
- Motive: Unknown
- Charges: First-degree murder with special circumstances (Note: Special circumstances of lying in wait.); Use a deadly weapon during the commission of a crime.
- Verdict: Guilty of both charges
- Sentence: Life imprisonment without the possibility of parole

The murder of Brianna Kupfer occurred on January 13, 2022, in which a 24-year-old University of California, Los Angeles student was murdered by Shawn Laval Smith in Los Angeles, California. Smith, a 31-year-old man with an extensive criminal record, stabbed Kupfer to death in the Croft House store where she was working in the Hancock Park neighborhood. A few minutes later, a customer found Kupfer's stabbed body, covered in blood. Kupfer was pronounced dead that day.

The high-profile search for the murder suspect became one of the biggest in the Southern California region, with a $250,000 reward offered. On January 19, Smith was found and arrested in Pasadena, California, and charged with first-degree murder with special circumstances and use of a deadly weapon during the commission of the murder. The prosecutor in charge of the case said that Kupfer's murder was motivated by Smith's hatred of women.

In September 2024, a jury of the Los Angeles County found Smith guilty of both charges. In October 2024, Smith was sentenced to life imprisonment without the possibility of parole.

== Background ==
=== Brianna Kupfer ===
Brianna Nicole Kupfer was born on April 9, 1997, (Note: This reference states that Brianna Kupfer would have turned 25 years old on April 9, 2022, meaning she was born on April 9, 1997.) she was one of four children born to Todd and Lori Kupfer. Kupfer was born and raised in Pacific Palisades, a neighborhood of Los Angeles, California. Kupfer attended Brentwood High School, where she was a member of various sports teams, captain of the cheerleading team, and participated in other extracurricular activities. In 2019, Kupfer graduated from the University of Miami with a degree in public relations. She enrolled in a graduate program at the University of California, Los Angeles (UCLA), to study architectural design. Kupfer worked as a consultant at Croft House, a luxury furniture store in the neighborhood of Hancock Park.

=== Shawn Smith ===
Shawn Smith
- Mugshot of Shawn Smith
- Born: Shawn Laval Smith; May 13, 1990 (age 36)
- Convictions: First-degree murder with special circumstances; Use a deadly weapon during the commission of a crime
- Penalty: Life imprisonment without the possibility of parole

Details
- Victims: Brianna Kupfer

Shawn Laval Smith was born on May 13, 1990, making him a 31-year-old man at the time of Kupfer's murder. Smith has an extensive criminal record and he was a homeless man. At the time of the crime, Smith was out on bond awaiting trial in South Carolina with the charges of firing a flare gun at a vehicle with a child inside. Several of his crimes were committed in South Carolina and California.

Crimes committed by Smith include:

- In April 2010, Smith was arrested and charged with breach of trust in Charleston, South Carolina.
- In June 2013, Smith was charged with simple possession of marijuana in Charleston.
- In March 2016, Smith was arrested for assaulting a police officer in Charleston.
- In March 2019, Smith was arrested and charged with entering a premises after a warning in Charleston.
- In June 2019, Smith was arrested on a bench warrant and charged with entering a premises after receiving a warning in Charleston.
- In November 2019, Smith was charged with discharge of a firearm into a vehicle in Charleston.
- In October 2020, Smith was arrested with a misdemeanor charge in Covina, California.
- In 2021, Smith vandalized a car and was charged with assault on a police officer and resisting arrest in Daly City, California.

== Murder ==
Location of Hancock Park, Los Angeles

On the afternoon of January 13, 2022, Kupfer was working alone at Croft House. At some point, a man, identified as Shawn Smith, entered the store. Around 1:36 p.m., Kupfer texted her manager saying she was getting "bad vibes" from the man who entered the store. A few minutes later, Smith attacked Kupfer with a knife. Kupfer suffered 46 stab wounds, the autopsy revealed that 26 were stab wounds and 20 were incisions.

Twenty minutes after the attack, a customer found Kupfer's stabbed body, covered in blood. The Los Angeles Police Department described the murder as a "random attack of violence". The knife was recovered at the scene, the blade was bent. Smith's DNA was found on the knife. In a surveillance video, Smith was seen walking away from the Croft House store through the back door. Another surveillance video recorded Smith shopping at a nearby 7-Eleven store 30 minutes after Kupfer's killing.

== Criminal proceedings ==
=== Search and arrest ===
After Smith was identified, an extensive search began throughout the Southern California region. Surveillance videos showing Smith were widely shared with the news media and the public. The Los Angeles City Council offered a $50,000 reward for information leading to Smith's arrest. Kupfer's relatives and other private groups increased the reward to $250,000. Signs were made with Smith's photo so that anyone who saw him could call 911.

On January 19, in Pasadena, California, Smith was found and arrested in connection with the murder of Brianna Kupfer. Smith was charged with first-degree murder with special circumstances and use of a deadly weapon during the commission of the murder of Kupfer. Smith's bail was set at $2,000,000.

=== Trial ===
Smith had wanted to represent himself at his murder trial, but Judge Escobedo revoked Smith's right to act as his own attorney at a hearing in June 2023 for misconduct. Smith was represented by Defense Attorney Robert Haberer.

On August 29, 2024, the murder trial started in the Los Angeles County Superior Court with Judge Mildred Escobedo. Los Angeles County Deputy Attorney Habib Balian was in charge of the case. Deputy Attorney Balian said in opening statements that Smith posed as a client to gain Kupfer's trust and then stabbed her to death. Just when Smith took out his knife to attack Kupfer after initially gaining her trust, she texted her friend about getting "bad vibes" from Smith and told Smith that she called the police too. Smith ordered Kupfer to get on the floor, and then she begged him to let her help him instead of killing her. Smith then stabbed Kupfer repeatedly, saying: "It's over, [expletive]" before fleeing the scene, as Kupfer sobbed in defeat while lying on the ground, soon being pronounced dead. Prosecutor presented audio of Smith saying he "hated women". The Defense Attorney Haberer opted not to make an opening statement.

On September 10, 2024, the jury found Shawn Smith guilty of both charges in relation to the murder of Brianna Kupfer. In October 2024, Smith was sentenced to life imprisonment without the possibility of parole.

== Reactions ==
A memorial for Brianna Kupfer was held in January 2022 at Croft House.

The murder of Brianna Kupfer and the search for her killer were widely reported in the news media and attracted national public attention. The case was also highly publicized on social media.

At Croft House, the place where Kupfer worked and was murdered, a memorial was held for her with flowers, cards, and pictures.

Family members of Kupfer, founded the "Brianna Kupfer Foundation", a non-profit organization which aims to fight against violence against women and defend victims of violence.

== See also ==
- Crime in California
- Crime in Los Angeles
- List of homicides in California
