= List of killings by law enforcement officers in the United States, September 2022 =

This is a list of people reported killed by non-military law enforcement officers in the United States in September 2022, whether in the line of duty or not, and regardless of reason or method. The listing documents the occurrence of a death, making no implications regarding wrongdoing or justification on the part of the person killed or officer involved. Killings are arranged by date of the incident that caused death. Different death dates, if known, are noted in the description. The table below lists 112 people.

== September 2022 ==
Date	Name (age) of deceased	Race of deceased	Location	Description
2022-09-30	Jason Kilduff (41)	White	Plains Township, PA	
2022-09-30	Broderick Dunn (22)	Black	Atlanta, GA	
2022-09-30	Amarion Clotter (18)	Black	Atlanta, GA	
2022-09-29	Anthony Geovany Lainez (25)	Hispanic	Broomfield, CO	
2022-09-29	David Gerard Jones (51)	Black	Baker, LA	
2022-09-28	Jaime Naranjo Bautista (55)	Hispanic	Sacramento, CA	
2022-09-28	Darrell Hibbard (64)	Unknown race	Dallas, TX	
2022-09-28	Daniel Joseph Sangrey (49)	White	Great Falls, MT	
2022-09-28	Terrance Maurice Sligh (34)	Black	Taylors, SC	
2022-09-28	Everett M. Martin (43)	White	Mineral City, OH	
2022-09-27	Lee Roy Villarreal (36)	Hispanic	Edinburg, TX	
2022-09-27	Anthony John Graziano (45)	White	Hesperia, California	Anthony Graziano, a fugitive suspected of kidnapping his 15-year-old daughter Savannah Graziano and killing her mother in Fontana, was shot and killed during a shootout with police, after an Amber alert was issued for Savannah. When Savannah exited the vehicle, police opened fire on and killed her, as she followed their instructions to move toward them. She was unarmed. One day after the killings, the San Bernardino County sheriff Shannon Dicus said that "evidence suggests that Savannah Graziano was a participant in shooting at our deputies". Dicus also said that Savannah was shot when she ran towards police, but video eventually showed that she was walking. In the eighteen months following Savannah's death, officials did not reveal whether police or Anthony killed her; following public records requests by the media, officials in late March 2024 released video footage of the shooting and revealed that it was police that killed Savannah.
2022-09-27	Savannah Graziano (15)	White	Hesperia, California	
2022-09-27	Jesús Iván Sepúlveda (22)	Hispanic	Sierra Blanca, TX	
2022-09-26	Jose Villanueva (21)	Hispanic	Greenacres, FL	
2022-09-26	Jason Charles Dunkel (50)	White	Henderson, NV	
2022-09-26	Raymond Berry Twork II (42)	White	Rembert, SC	
2022-09-26	Jebb Muir (44)	White	South Salt Lake, UT	
2022-09-25	Jaylen Lewis (25)	Black	Jackson, Mississippi	A Mississippi Capitol Police officer shot Lewis following a traffic stop. Few details were released.
2022-09-25	Leroy Quick, Jr (71)	Black	Sumter, SC	
2022-09-24	Ali Osman (34)	Black	Phoenix, Arizona	A police vehicle was responding to a call when it was hit with a rock. When officers came back to investigate, Osman allegedly kept throwing rocks at police. Police shot Osman, who died at a hospital.
2022-09-24	Timothy W. Shafer (37)	Unknown race	Ozark, MO	
2022-09-24	Donna M. Bailey (23)	Unknown race	Ozark, MO	
2022-09-24	Marlon Bonds (34)	Unknown race	Rancho Cucamonga, CA	
2022-09-24	Darin Dyer (38)	White	North Las Vegas, NV	
2022-09-23	Henry Wilson Mercer (63)	White	Ocilla, GA	
2022-09-23	Amado Ramos (36)	Unknown	Wapato, Washington	Sheriff's deputies attempted to contact Ramos, a wanted suspect, which led to a pursuit. Ramos rammed a sheriff's vehicle as he fled the area and proceeded to drive the wrong way down on a freeway. Spike strips were set up and Ramos crashed his vehicle and ran into nearby cornfield where he was shot by police for reasons currently unknown. Deputies performed CPR, but Ramos died at the scene. The incident is under investigation.
2022-09-23	Timothy C. Connor (49)	Unknown	Jefferson County, Washington	Details of the shooting are not known - The Washington State Patrol will conduct an investigation. A handgun that did not belong to deputies was located near Mr. Connor. Connor was airlifted to a Medical Center where he was pronounced deceased.
2022-09-23	Antonio Gonzales (29)	Unknown race	Austin, TX	
2022-09-23	Darian Patrick Fisher (41)	Black	Chillicothe, TX	
2022-09-22	Terris Vincent Hetland (49)	White	Sequim, Washington	Law enforcement responded to a domestic violence call. A woman was hit over the head with an axe by her boyfriend. Officials found the woman and she was taken to a medical center where she was treated and later released with non-life threatening injuries. Deputies tried to make contact with the suspect, who was inside a shop building on the property. Additional agencies responded to the incident, and law enforcement continued to try and communicate with the man inside the shop and negotiate with him over the course of several hours. The suspect ended up coming out of the shop and fired a weapon at SWAT officers and they returned fire, and struck the suspect. The suspect died at the scene.
2022-09-22	Greg Hightower	Black	Houston, Texas	A military recruiter shot and killed his wife as she was speaking on the phone with Naval Criminal Investigative Service (NCIS) investigators, according to police. As the man ran away he fired at other NCIS investigators, wounding one. As he was driving to his mother's home the recruiter fired at deputies from the Harris County Constable's Office Precinct 4, who returned fire, killing him.
2022-09-21	Berlin Gonzalez (45)	Hispanic	Destin, FL	
2022-09-21	Doris Jean Taylor (39)	White	Powellsville, NC	
2022-09-20	Arlo "Amos" Campbell (34)	White	Hazelton, ID	
2022-09-20	Rock Jordan	Unknown race	Grants Pass, OR	
2022-09-20	Colby Atkins (45)	Native American	Albuquerque, NM	
2022-09-19	Bryan Coupal (75)	White	Riverdale Park, MD	
2022-09-19	Mark Barrett Caldwell (46)	White	Grants Pass, OR	
2022-09-19	Martin Camacho (26)	Hispanic	Earlimart, CA	
2022-09-18	Alejandro Vitela (29)	Hispanic	San Antonio, TX	
2022-09-18	Jeremiah James Johnson (39)	Native American	Adams, OR	
2022-09-17	Rito Paul Morales (51)	Hispanic	Elgin, TX	
2022-09-17	Luis Herrera (19)	Hispanic	Los Angeles, CA	
2022-09-17	Mathew Lopez (27)	Hispanic	Fresno, CA	
2022-09-17	Anthony Hopkins Sr. (48)	Unknown race	Harwood, MD	
2022-09-17	Name Withheld ()	Unknown race	Toppenish, WA	
2022-09-17	Name Withheld	White	Auburn, CA	
2022-09-16	Alexis Pulido (22)	Hispanic	Inglewood, CA	
2022-09-16	Colby Archer (39)	White	Weatherford, OK	
2022-09-15	Weston Cassody (35)	White	Covington, OK	
2022-09-15	Marcus Adam Fuentes (36)	Latino	Kingman, Arizona	Police attempted to arrest Fuentes for active warrants, causing a foot chase. According to police, Fuentes stated he had a gun and reached towards his waistband, after which an officer shot him. No weapons were found at the scene.
2022-09-14	Genesis Hicks (26)	Black	Frisco, Texas	Police approached Hicks after he allegedly purchased a vehicle from a car dealership with fake identification. When Hicks ran, an officer tased him, causing him to hit his head on the ground. He fell into a coma and died around two weeks later on September 29.
2022-09-14	Michael John De Ubl (25)	Unknown race	Flagstaff, AZ	
2022-09-14	Joe Pickett (64)	White	Gruetli-Laager, TN	
2022-09-14	Emanuel Padilla-Tirado (31)	Hispanic	Reading, PA	
2022-09-14	Anton Washington (22)	Black	Marietta, GA	
2022-09-14	Timothy Michael Randall (29)	White	Rusk County, Texas	A deputy pulled Randall over for a traffic violation. Randall allegedly tried to conceal "contraband" in his waistband and resisted attempts to be handcuffed, leading to a struggle. After Randall broke free and stood up while the deputy was still on the ground, the deputy shot him. A grand jury declined to indict the deputy.
2022-09-13	Sherman D. Solomon (40)	Black	Milwaukee, WI	
2022-09-13	Tyshawn Malick Benjamin (25)	Black	York County, South Carolina	Benjamin was shot and killed by a York County Deputy after a 30-minute high speed chase. The chase started after deputies tried to pull over a stolen vehicle driven by Benjamin. Deputies attempted to arrest Benjamin after boxing the vehicle in a parking lot. A deputy then shot and killed Benjamin after he rammed the stolen vehicle into the door of the deputy's car.
2022-09-12	David Litts (61)	White	Utica, NY	
2022-09-12	Dennis McCullers (63)	Unknown race	Monroe, GA	
2022-09-12	Robert Harris (50)	Unknown race	Springfield, OR	
2022-09-12	Anthony Maurice Tollison (39)	White	Mt Airy, GA	
2022-09-12	Cody Kiley (31)	Unknown race	St. Petersburg, FL	
2022-09-11	Igor Lanis (53)	White	Walled Lake, Michigan	Police responded after Lanis's daughter called 911 to report he had shot and killed his wife and dog and wounded her. When officers arrived Lanis allegedly fired at them with a shotgun and died when police returned fire.
2022-09-11	Darryl Ross (16)	Black	St. Louis, MO	
2022-09-11	James Edward Vought (49)	White	Clermont, FL	
2022-09-11	Giovanni Luna (35)	Hispanic	Los Angeles, CA	
2022-09-11	Unknown male (36)	Latino	Houston, Texas	
2022-09-10	Gabriel Herrera Charles (27)	Hispanic	Las Vegas, NV	
2022-09-10	Aaron Baughman (40)	White	Phoenix, AZ	
2022-09-10	Derrick Ameer Ellis-Cook	Black	Burien, WA	
2022-09-09	Edwin Medina Baires (40)	Hispanic	Elk City, OK	
2022-09-09	Daniel K. McAlpin (41)	White	Wawarsing, NY	
2022-09-09	James Preston Trexler Jr. (44)	White	Hudson, NC	
2022-09-08	Joshua Hagans (40)	Black	Lexington, Kentucky	Police responded to a hotel for reports of trespassing and assault, and when they attempted to contact Hagans, he denied them access to his room. When police gained access to Hagans' room, he fired his gun at officers, who returned fire. Following a 10-hour standoff, police entered Hagans' room and found him suffering from multiple gunshots. He was transported to hospital where he died. One officer sustained non-life-threatening injuries.
2022-09-08	Unnamed person (36)	Unknown race	Middle Smithfield Township, PA	
2022-09-08	George W Franklin (47)	Black	Zion, IL	
2022-09-08	John Stutts (28)	White	Springville, AL	
2022-09-07	Bade Ali Jabir (61)	Black	St. Louis, Missouri	When a fugitive apprehension team approached Jabir's apartment to serve warrants for resisting arrest, assault, and a weapons charge, Jabir barricaded himself inside, and a SWAT team was called. Police used tear gas and tasers in an attempt to remove Jabir, and when the SWAT team eventually broke the barricade and entered the apartment, they shot Jabir dead when he charged them with a knife.
2022-09-07	Reginald Grant (30)	Black	Columbus, GA	
2022-09-07	Donald Wayne Henry (51)	White	Flagstaff, AZ	
2022-09-07	Tyler Woodburn (30)	White	Waterboro, ME	
2022-09-07	Tyler Michael Gardner (27)	White	Jonesborough, TN	
2022-09-07	Benison Tran (57)	Asian	Dublin, California	An Alameda County Sheriff's deputy was accused of killing a married couple at their home. After several hours on the run the deputy turned himself into police.
2022-09-07	Maria Tran (42)	Asian	Dublin, California	An Alameda County Sheriff's deputy was accused of killing a married couple at their home. After several hours on the run the deputy turned himself into police.
2022-09-06	Bryon Childers (61)	Unknown race	Strongs Prairie, WI	
2022-09-06	Linda Childs (71)	White	Corinth, MS	
2022-09-05	Denise Blidy (66)	White	Burbank, Illinois	Blidy died after she was struck by a police car while bicycling. The Illinois State Police Public Integrity Unit is investigating.
2022-09-05	Darylray Charles Lopez (29)	Hispanic	Thornton, CO	
2022-09-05	Maalik Amir Roquemore (32)	Black	Cleveland, OH	
2022-09-04	Victor Escobar-Galdamez (38)	Hispanic	Webster, Texas	Decedent was shot and killed after threatening police with two steak knives.
2022-09-04	Robert Bradley (41)	White	Spokane, Washington	Bradley was unloading camping gear when he was approached by police officers. A neighbor called police and said Bradley was walking around with an AR-15 style rifle. Police approached Bradley and shot him within a few moments after arriving on the scene. Bradley's family has filed a lawsuit against the city.
2022-09-04	Name Withheld (54)	Unknown race	Federal Way, WA	
2022-09-03	Tommie Gilmore (77)	Black	Gordon, GA	
2022-09-03	Nikolas McPheter (27)	White	Needles, CA	
2022-09-03	Bernard Placide (22)	Black	Englewood, NJ	
2022-09-02	Joshua Butler (44)	Unknown race	Austin, TX	
2022-09-02	Ernest Terrell Blakney (47)	Black	Milwaukee, WI	
2022-09-02	Corey David Garriott (38)	White	Casper, WY	
2022-09-02	Joshua A. Michael (37)	White	Springfield, MO	
2022-09-02	Harrison Brown (32)	Unknown race	Houston, TX	
2022-09-02	Justin Livesay (40)	White	Fayetteville, NC	
2022-09-02	Jimmie Janeway (63)	Unknown race	Wasilla, AK	
2022-09-02	Rushdee Anderson (41)	Black	Los Angeles, CA	
2022-09-02	Kenneth Elonzo Marion, Jr. (68)	Black	Casper, WY	
2022-09-01	Peter J. Jaeger (57)	Unknown race	Rockford, IL	
2022-09-01	Jaiden Malik Carter (19)	Black	Woodbridge Township, VA	
2022-09-01	Jonathan May (31)	White	Rockwall, TX	
2022-09-01	Brian Fisher (43)	White	Pittsburgh, PA	
2022-09-01	Mark Leonard Lovato (59)	White	Salt Lake City, UT	

== See also ==
- Death in custody § United States
- Henry A. Wallace Police Crime Public Database
- List of cases of police brutality
- List of countries with annual rates and counts for killings by law enforcement officers
- List of law enforcement officers killed in the line of duty in the United States
- List of law enforcement officers convicted for an on-duty killing in the United States
- List of shootings by US immigration agents
- List of police reforms related to the George Floyd protests
- List of unarmed African Americans killed by law enforcement officers in the United States
- Lists of killings by law enforcement officers
- Police brutality in the United States
- Police misconduct § United States
- Police riot § United States
- Police use of deadly force in the United States
