= Harbor City serial shootings =

1993 series of shootings in Los Angeles, California, U.S.

Harbor City serial shooter
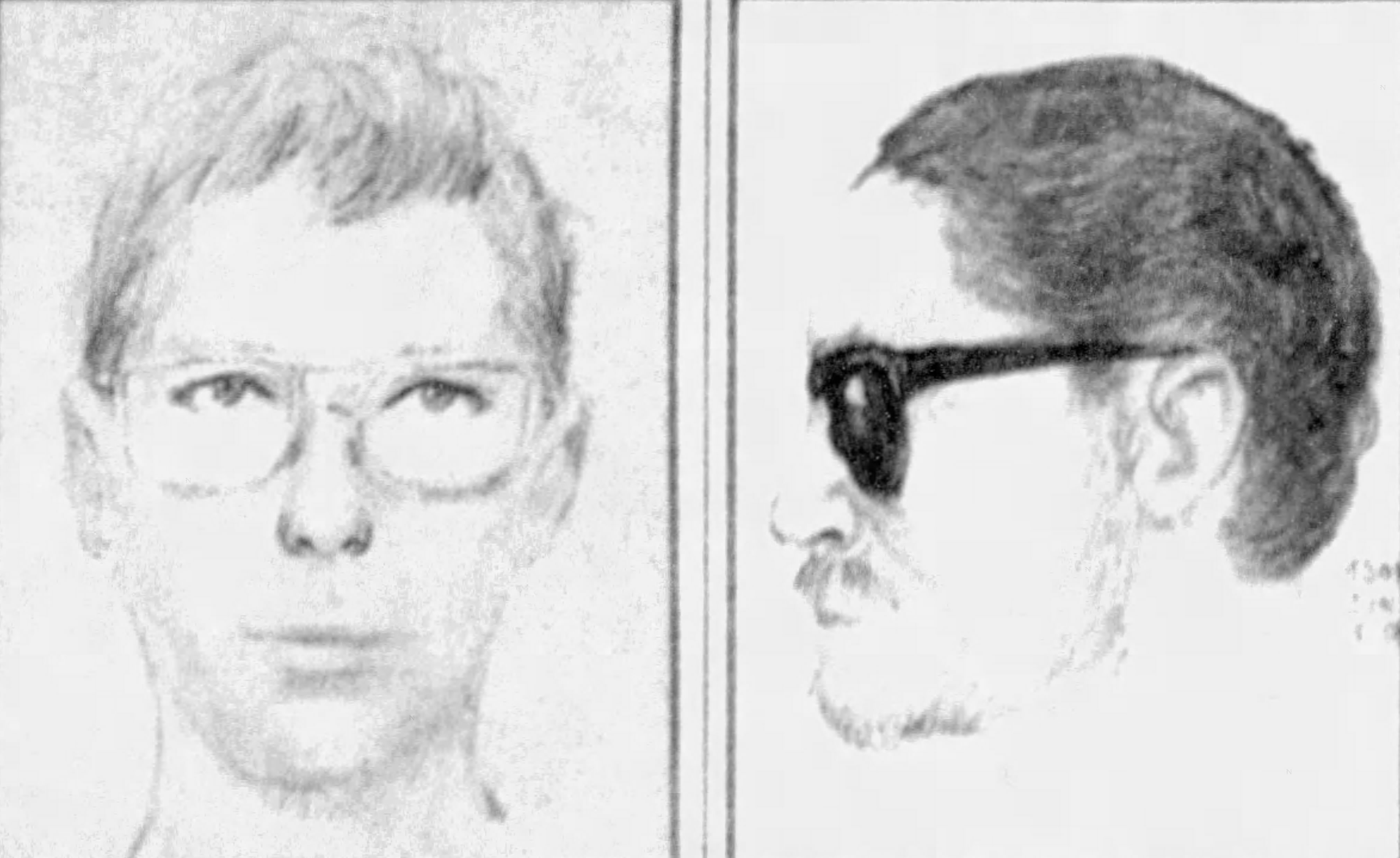
- Composite sketches of the shooter
- Wanted since: January 31, 1993; 33 years ago

Details
- Victims: 3 killed; 1 wounded
- Span of crimes: January 31 – May 22, 1993
- Country: United States
- State: California
- Weapon: Firearm
- Date apprehended: Never apprehended

The Harbor City serial shootings were an unsolved series of drive-by shootings committed in the Harbor City neighborhood of Los Angeles, California, United States, during the early months of 1993. A total of four black men were shot within a two-block radius, three of them fatally. Despite a detailed description of the perpetrator and his car given by the surviving victim and witnesses to the murders, he remains unidentified to date.

== Shootings ==
The first shooting occurred at about 9:00 p.m. on January 31, 1993, when 32-year-old Howard L. Campbell was fatally shot at 1087 W. 252nd Street.

The next victim was 35-year-old Michael Kevin Meador, who was shot to death during the night of February 14, 1993. Meador was murdered while standing in front of the same address as Campbell.

On April 15, 1993, 26-year-old Joseph Alexander Maxwell was shot and killed as he approached the perpetrator's vehicle at 1039 W. 254 Street, two blocks away from where the first and second murders occurred.

On May 22, 1993, an unnamed 38-year-old was shot three times at the 1100 block of West 253rd Street, a block away from where the first and second murders occurred. The man survived.

== Investigation ==
The surviving victim was able to give a description of a perpetrator and his vehicle: a red-haired white man between 25 and 35 years of age who drove a jeep. This description matched ones given by witnesses to the prior attacks. Other descriptions described the jeep in further detail, stating that the car was red and had a white top. Additionally, three of the four attacks occurred between 8:00 and 9:30 p.m. With this information, the police connected all of the murders to a single unknown suspect and created a composite sketch. Despite this, the murders remain unsolved, as does the motive. Although all of the victims were black, the police were unsure if the shootings were racially-motivated. Robbery is the only motive that was ruled out by investigators.

== See also ==
- Crime in Los Angeles
- Cold case
- Gun violence in the United States
- List of serial killers in the United States
