= Alatyr (inhabited locality) =

Alatyr (Russian: Алатырь) is the name of several inhabited localities in Russia.

Urban localities

- Alatyr, Chuvash Republic, a town in the Chuvash Republic

Rural localities

- Alatyr, Nizhny Novgorod Oblast, a village under the administrative jurisdiction of the town of oblast significance of Pervomaysk in Nizhny Novgorod Oblast

== See also ==
- Alatyrsky District
