= Easter Sunday heist =

2024 burglary in Los Angeles

- Date: March 31, 2024; 2 years ago
- Time: c. 11:30 p.m. – 4:30 a.m. (Note: It can't be certain that the first burglar alarm was when the heist began, however most sources cite the event happening in the early hours of March 31th, 2024.) (PDT)
- Location: Roxford Street, Sylmar, Los Angeles, California, United States; 34.3092904°N 118.4711922°W
- Type: Burglary
- Target: GardaWorld
- Perpetrator: Unknown (Note: LAPD captain Elaine Morales has said there is likely multiple perpetrators.)
- Outcome: Upwards of $20 million stolen

During the early morning hours of March 31, 2024—which fell on the Easter holiday—thieves broke into a GardaWorld facility in Sylmar, Los Angeles and stole upwards of around $20 million. It was one of the largest thefts ever perpetrated in the United States.

== Incident ==
At approximately 11:30 pm on March 30, 2024, a burglar alarm was triggered at the GardaWorld private security facility located on Roxford Street in Sylmar, Los Angeles. The Los Angeles Police Department (LAPD) service call for this alert—the latest in over a dozen similar calls from the previous twelve months at this location—was likewise dismissed as a false alarm. Three additional service calls were triggered beginning at 4:30 am the following morning, which corresponded with Easter Sunday. Upon investigation, no suspicious activity was detected. The break-in was first officially reported to the LAPD around noon. It was only determined the following day that around $30 million was missing from the safe, an amount that was later downgraded to upwards of $20 million. Initially, officials suspected that thieves had made attempts to enter the building by breaking holes through the walls and roof, the latter having later determined to be the point of entry. Upon entering the building, which involved the use of tunneling, the burglars were able to access the safe without triggering any alarms, with apparently no signs of forcible entry to the vault area.

The heist was one of the largest thefts in the history of the United States. It surpassed the Dunbar Armored robbery—also in Los Angeles—in which six men stole nearly $19 million in 1997.

== Investigation ==
The LAPD and the Federal Bureau of Investigation are jointly investigating the crime. A resident of the adjacent Tahitian Mobile Home Park said that she heard a mechanical whirring sound which lasted at least two hours emanating from the GardaWorld facility during the early morning of Easter Sunday. A nearby convenience store owner reported that his shop's WiFi signal was inoperable for most of that day, leading to suspicions that the burglars may have used jamming equipment in order to disable security cameras.

== See also ==
- Category:Robberies of armored vehicles
