= Ventura Strangler =

Unsolved serial murders

Details
- Victims: 3
- Span of crimes: May – December 1977
- Country: United States
- State: California
- Location: Ventura County
- Date apprehended: August 8, 2024

The Ventura Strangler is the name given to an American serial killer responsible for the murders of three sex workers in Ventura County, California, from May to December 1977. The killings occurred around the same time the Hillside Strangler was active in nearby Los Angeles, and at one point they were thought to be linked before it became evident that a separate killer was responsible.

In 2024, it was announced that Warren Luther Alexander, who at the time was awaiting trial for a 1992 murder in North Carolina, had been linked to the Ventura killings via DNA. He was extradited to California and is currently awaiting trial.

== Murders ==
On May 29, 1977, the body of 18-year-old Kimberly Carol Fritz was discovered lying on a bed in a motel in Port Hueneme. At the time, Fritz was under the alias "Carol Brown" and had engaged in prostitution in nearby Oxnard. She had been strangled to death, and although investigators located one witness that they used hypnosis on, the investigation brought very few leads.

On September 9, the body of 31-year-old Velvet Ann Sanchez was found on the floor of a hotel room in Oxnard. Similar with the Fritz case, Sanchez had been strangled to death.

On December 27, the body of 22-year-old Lorraine Rodriguez was found on a bridge in Oxnard. She too had been strangled to death.

== Investigation ==
At the time of Ventura killings, nearby Los Angeles was dealing with similar murders that were later attributed to a "Hillside Strangler", and the deaths of Fritz, Sanchez, and Rodriguez were suspected to be linked to that case. This suspicion only furthered after Richard Reynolds, a deceased man who became a suspect in the Los Angeles killings, was in Ventura County at the time of the killings there. However, Reynolds was later cleared in both cases. In 1979, Kenneth Bianchi and Angelo Buono were arrested for the Los Angeles killings.

=== 2024 arrest ===
In August 2024, investigators were notified when DNA in the Ventura killings was matched to a suspect, 73-year-old Warren Luther Alexander. Alexander, a native of Southern California, was a former truck driver who was arrested in 2022 for the 1992 murder of Nona Cobb in North Carolina. Alexander was subsequently indicted with the murders and extradited to California. He has pleaded not guilty and is slated for trial.

== See also ==
- List of serial killers in the United States
