= Dunbar Armored robbery =

1997 robbery in Los Angeles

On September 12, 1997, six men robbed the Dunbar Armored facility on Mateo St. in Downtown Los Angeles, California of US$18.9 million (equivalent to $37.9 million in 2025). The robbery was orchestrated by Allen Pace III, of Compton, with childhood friends Erik Damon Boyd, of Buena Park, Eugene Lamar Hill Jr., of Bellflower, Freddie Lynn McCrary Jr., of Arleta, Terry Wayne Brown Sr., of Los Angeles, and Thomas Lee Johnson, of Las Vegas, Nevada. It was the largest cash robbery to have occurred in the United States until the Easter Sunday heist on March 31, 2024 which was estimated at over $20 million.

While the group left almost no evidence, Hill was implicated two years later when he accidentally gave a real estate broker a stack of banknotes that were still secured in their original currency straps; the broker contacted the police. Hill confessed, implicating the five other robbers, and three other men who had assisted in laundering the money. Pace was sentenced to 24 years in prison in 2001; Boyd was sentenced to 17 years, and the other four robbers received sentences ranging from 8 to 10 years. Two of the men who assisted in money laundering were sentenced to 2.5 years.

== Robbery ==
The robbery was masterminded by Allen Pace III, who worked for Dunbar as a regional safety inspector. While on the job, Pace had time to photograph and examine the company's Los Angeles armored car depot. He recruited five of his childhood friends, providing them with detailed floor plans and camera locations, ski masks, pistols, a shotgun, and radio headsets. The day before the robbery, Pace was fired by Dunbar for tampering with company vehicles. On the night of Friday, September 12, 1997, the group of six assembled at a house party—‌to establish an alibi—‌before leaving, where Pace used his keys to gain admittance to the facility. Pace had timed the security cameras and determined how they could be avoided. Once inside, they waited within the staff cafeteria, ambushing the guards one by one as they took their lunch breaks at approximately 12:30 am.

Pace knew that on Friday nights, the vault was left open due to the large quantities of money being moved. Rushing the two vault guards, the robbers managed to subdue all employees with duct tape before they could signal any alarms and did not fire a shot. In 30 minutes, the robbers had loaded $18.9 million into a waiting U-Haul truck. Pace knew which bags contained the highest denominations and non-sequential bills. He also knew where the recording devices for the security cameras were located and took them. The group then returned to the house party.

The police immediately realized it was an inside job, and closely examined Pace—‌due to his recent firing—‌but could find nothing. Investigators at the depot only found a plastic taillight lens, matching a U-Haul truck. The gang worked hard to conceal their new wealth, waiting six months before attempting to launder the $18.9 million. They enlisted the help of David Matsumoto, a Los Angeles immigration attorney, paying him and his office manager Joaquin Bin $1 million each for their assistance. Matsumoto structured the transactions via buying property and cars, investing in companies, and writing checks and W-2 tax forms for the robbers to give the impression they were earning wages. Pace also created his own front companies to launder more money and enlisted another man's help to buy property, so they would not be listed under Pace's name. Boyd, through his father's company, laundered $177,000. Most or all of the robbers were laundering cash through real estate.

Two years after the robbery, Hill made a critical error when he paid one of his friends—‌a real estate broker—‌with a stack of cash bound together with the original branded currency straps; suspicious, the broker then went to the police. Detectives noticed Hill had rented a U-Haul on the day of the robbery. Arrested, Hill soon confessed and named all co-conspirators.

== Aftermath ==
Allen Pace, initially claiming innocence, was arrested and sentenced to 24 years in prison on April 23, 2001, and was incarcerated at a Federal Correctional Institution in Safford until his release on October 1, 2020. Another collaborator, Boyd, was sentenced to 17 years, due to his use of a gun and a prior criminal record. The four others, pleading guilty, received sentences between 8 and 10 years. Matsumoto was also implicated, resigning from the State Bar. He and Bin were indicted on 71 counts related to money laundering and sentenced to 2.5 years. Less than a third (US$5 million) of the money was ever recovered, with some US$13.9 million still unaccounted for.

In September 2020, Charm City Kings producer Caleeb Pinkett announced a film based on the robbery.

== See also ==
- List of bank robbers and robberies
