= Lynching of the Ruggles brothers =

1892 lynching in California, United States

Dead bodies of the Ruggles brothers discovered by Redding residents, 1892. John Ruggles on the left, Charles Ruggles on the right.

The lynching of the Ruggles brothers took place on July 24, 1892, in Redding, California, United States.

== History ==
Brothers John and Charles Ruggles thought that they could make some easy money by robbing a stagecoach. John, a sex addict and ex-convict, had lost his wife to illness and had left his young daughter to live with relatives while he went to live off the land in the Sierra Nevada mountains. Concerned about his brother's well-being, Charles sought him out in the mountains. John had been robbing stagecoaches throughout California and Nevada with a man called Arizona Pete, and talked Charles into joining him on the outlaw trail.

On May 10, 1892, the brothers robbed the Weaverville stage, but the take was small. The men settled on a location on top of a hill five miles north of Redding to pull off their next robbery. The stage would be moving slowly, and the horses would be tired from the uphill journey. The brothers stopped the stage on May 12, 1892, and everything went according to plan, until Charles was hit with buckshot fired by a guard riding inside the coach. More shots rang out, and soon passenger George Suhr, driver Johnny Boyce and guard Amos "Buck" Montgomery were all wounded. John Ruggles ran up to Montgomery and shot the seriously wounded man in the back, killing him.

Boyce regained control of his team and drove off as fast as the horses could run. John, thinking that Charles was mortally wounded, said goodbye to his brother, grabbed the money and fled the scene. A posse found Charles where he was shot and took him into custody. His wounds looked worse than they were, and he was soon recovering in the Redding jail.

Under questioning by Wells Fargo detective John Thacker, Charles admitted that the other robber was his brother John. A reward of eleven hundred dollars was placed on John's head. John Ruggles was arrested while eating a meal at a restaurant in his hometown of Woodland, California, by a Yolo County deputy sheriff. Taken by train to Redding, John was overcome with joy upon seeing that his brother was not dead.

== Support from women ==
"The recent sentimental attitude of a number of women toward the prisoners as well as the line of defense adopted by their counsel, who has been evidently endeavoring to implicate Messenger [Amos "Buck"] Montgomery [the dead victim] as a party to the crime, had been denounced by a number of persons in the county and it is believed the lynching was due to those causes." "While in jail, the handsome brothers were fed and pampered by local ladies who brought flower bouquets, cakes, fruits, and even offers of marriage, which supposedly prompted their speedy hanging by local jealous males."

== Lynching ==
A trial was set for July 28, 1892. On July 24, an armed mob of masked men (approximately 40-75 men) stormed the jail, blew open the safe that held the jail keys, dragged the brothers out of their cell, John Ruggles offered to reveal the stolen loot's location if the mob would spare his brother Charles but the mob refused and hanged them from a derrick at the corner of Shasta street. No one was ever prosecuted for the lynching.

== For further reading ==
- John Boessenecker, Shotguns and Stagecoaches: The Brave Men Who Rode for Wells Fargo in the Wild West (2018)
