= Skid Row Stabber =

Unidentified American serial killer

Details
- Victims: 11
- Span of crimes: 1978–1979
- Country: United States
- State: California
- Date apprehended: Suspect convicted 1979; exonerated 2017 but never knew as he suffered a heart attack and was in a coma until his death in 2019.

The Skid Row Stabber is an American serial killer, responsible for the murders of 11 people in the Los Angeles neighborhood known as Skid Row, which is notorious for housing a huge number of homeless people, who are regularly subjected to victimization. The criminal's signature weapon was a knife. While a suspect named Bobby Joe Maxwell was arrested, charged, and sentenced for the murders, his conviction was overturned in 2010.

== Murders ==
The murders began on the morning of October 23, 1978. As victims, the killer chose the homeless, whose corpses were dumped in the alleyways of the various streets, located close to each other. The first victim was 50-year-old Jesse Martinez. On October 29, the stabber killed his second victim, 32-year-old Jose Cortes, followed a day later by 46-year-old Bruce Emmett Drake. On November 4, 65-year-old J.P. Henderson was killed, and on November 9, 39-year-old David Martin Jones was attacked and brutally killed near the Los Angeles City Hall. Two days later, 57-year-old Francisco Pérez Rodriguez became the next victim.

The day after, the stabber committed a double murder, killing 36-year-old Frank Floyd Reed and 49-year-old Augustine E. Luna. On November 17, 34-year-old Milford Fletcher, a Native American, was killed. Three days later, the serial killer murdered 45-year-old Frank García, whose body was found on November 23 near City Hall. Despite the fact that this murder occurred in a prestigious area of the city, with a large crowd present, the killer managed to escape unnoticed. No witnesses were located, but an imprint of a man's hand was found next to García's body, which, according to the investigators, could've been left by the killer. The last confirmed victim of the Skid Row Stabber was 26-year-old Luis Alvarez, who was stabbed to death on January 21, 1979.

== Investigation ==
During the subsequent investigation, witnesses were found to David Jones' murder: Three friends of the deceased claimed that an unknown person had talked with them for several minutes before committing the murder, after which he stabbed Jones. According to the witnesses, the criminal was a 30-year-old black man, who spoke with a Puerto Rican accent and introduced himself as Luther. Three months later, in January 1979, the inscription "My name is Luther, I kill wine o’s. I put them out of their misery!" was found in the toilet of the Los Angeles Bus Terminal.

== Suspect ==
During the investigation, several people were suspected by authorities. In early 1979, a forensic examination of the fingerprints from the palm print found next to García's body were revealed to belong to 29-year-old Bobby Joe Maxwell, who had been released from prison in his native Tennessee and moved to Los Angeles in 1977. A casual worker, Maxwell spent a lot of his free time in the Skid Row area.

In December 1978, he demonstrated deviant behavior against sleeping homeless people, and he was arrested on charges of disturbing the public order. A knife was seized during his arrest. He was convicted and spent several weeks in the county jail, then he was released three days before, according to the investigators, the stabber committed his last murder. While Maxwell was in prison, the Skid Row Stabber didn't commit any murders, and based on these facts, he was arrested on suspicion of murder in April 1979.

After his arrest, Maxwell's apartment was searched, during which his shoes, clothes, diaries and letters were seized. After studying and analyzing the acquired content, the investigators stated that Maxwell was a satanist. The trial, for various reasons, was delayed for five years, opening in early 1984. The prosecution's key witness was 37-year-old Sidney Storch, a felon with an extensive criminal record, who in 1983 was Maxwell's cellmate for three weeks. At trial, Storch claimed that Maxwell repeatedly admitted to killing the homeless and described the murders in detail.

In addition to Storch's testimony and the witnesses to David Jones' murder, the investigation established that the knife found on Maxwell had the same width and length as the one used by the killer. A graphological examination was conducted, concluding that Maxwell had left the note in the Bus Terminal building and confessed to the murders. On the basis of these testimonies and the other evidence presented, Maxwell was found guilty of two murders at the end of 1984, and he was sentenced to life imprisonment without a chance of parole. Despite the fact that there was no material evidence found in the other murders, the public and media blamed all of the 11 murders on him, resulting in Maxwell being identified as the Skid Row Stabber for many years.

== Further developments ==
The debate over Bobby Joe Maxwell's guilt continued for several decades, and he pled not guilty and regularly lodged appeals over the next 30 years. In 2010, Maxwell's lawyers were able to prove that the witnesses to Jones' murder couldn't identify him as the killer and had given false testimonies in court because of pressure from the investigators. It was proven that Sidney Storch, a former police officer and an informant for many years, had begun abusing his position in 1980 and had given false testimony in a number of trials due to selfish interests. As a result, in at least six cases, his testimony was considered invalid or unreliable. Considering these facts, the appellate court overturned Maxwell's sentence in 2010 and appointed him a new trial.

At the end of 2017, Maxwell suffered from a severe heart attack, which caused him to fall into a coma. In a new trial, the Los Angeles County Prosecutor's Office dropped all charges against Maxwell, after which, in August 2018, he was found not guilty, and his conviction and prison sentence were ruled as miscarriages of justice. Maxwell himself died in April 2019, never regaining consciousness and unable to learn of his release. The identity of the Skid Row Stabber remains unknown.

== See also ==
- Vaughn Greenwood
- List of fugitives from justice who disappeared
- List of serial killers in the United States
