= Killing of William Leonard =

1968 police shooting in Los Angeles, California

- Date: March 9, 1968
- Location: 557 W Imperial Hwy Los Angeles, CA
- Type: Shooting

William Anthony Leonard (1949 – March 9, 1968) was a 19 year old African-American man who was shot and killed by an LAPD officer Larry N. Fultz.

== Shooting ==
Leonard had been babysitting for Augustus and Barbara Mallard at 557 W. Imperial Hwy., to earn extra money. Police showed up at the home in response to a call that August Mallard had been threatening to kill his wife Barbara. Upon arrival, officers found August Mallard waving a pistol, Fultz approached a back window to question Barbara Mallard when he saw Leonard opening a window in the bathroom of the home. Fultz shot and killed Leonard, who had his arms raised and was facing away from the window.

Following his death in 1968, Jeff and Josephine Leonard filed a lawsuit for $1,000,000 (equivalent to $9,923,077 in 2025). Los Angeles City Council recommended it be denied, but voted unanimously to award a $25,000 (equivalent to $248,077 in 2025) settlement 4 years later in 1972. It was the first settlement for police misconduct in Los Angeles' history.
