= Interstate 80 rapist =

American serial rapist

- Capture status: Convicted
- Wanted by: Sacramento County Sheriff's Department

Details
- Victims: 3 sexual assaults
- State: California

The Interstate 80 rapist, also known as the Clover Leaf Rapist, is an American serial rapist who was active in Sacramento, California, between 2013 and 2014. In 2021, JD Wallace Simien (born 1980/81) was arrested after genetic genealogy connected him to the case. He was convicted in October 2024 and sentenced to 82 years to life in February 2025.

== Crimes ==
While many have been convinced that other assaults took place by the same man, only three have been successfully linked by DNA:

- September 9, 2013 at 4:20am
- December 10, 2013 at 9:15pm
- January 8, 2014 at 4:30am

== Investigation ==
=== Suspects eliminated ===
- Robert Hill - Despite Hill being a convicted serial rapist, detectives from the Sacramento Sheriff's Department ruled him out and announced that he was not connected to the series of rapes.
- Kenneth Anderson - Victims of the I-80 Rapist were convinced, when shown Anderson, that he strongly resembled their attacker. However, Anderson gave DNA and he was cleared as a suspect in the rapes.

=== Arrest and conviction ===
The case became known as the Clover Leaf Rapist due to the attacks happening around the freeway entrances and exits that form a cloverleaf pattern. After it became a cold case, police used DNA from rape kits and clothing to find a match. As with the Golden State Killer, police used genetic genealogy to connect him to DNA samples. JD Simien was arrested in November 2021 on suspicion of serial rape. He lived in Sacramento County, where the attacks happened, with his family. He was convicted in October 2024 of forcible rape and oral rape, sexual battery, kidnapping, and assault. He was sentenced on 21 February 2025 to 82 years to life.

The case was presented at the California Association of Criminalists meeting in 2025 by TeriAnn Grimes of the DA's office.
