= Killing of Meagan Hockaday =

African American killed by police officer in Oxnard, California

Death of Meagan Hockaday
- Date: March 28, 2015
- Time: 1:00 a.m.
- Location: West Vineyard Avenue, Oxnard, California, U.S.
- Participants: Meagan Hockaday; Roger Garcia (Oxnard Police Department officer)
- Outcome: Under investigation
- Deaths: 1

Meagan Hockaday was a 26-year-old African American resident of Oxnard, California who was shot and killed by police officer Roger Garcia in the early hours of Saturday, March 28, 2015.

Garcia responded to a 911 call made by Hockaday's fiancé, Luis Morado, reporting a domestic dispute at The Timbers, an apartment complex in Oxnard. Within twenty seconds of officers arriving at the family's apartment, Hockaday, who was wielding a knife and apparently advanced at the officers, was fatally shot by Garcia. The couple's three children were in the apartment at the time. They were subsequently evaluated by Child Protective Services and released to family.

== Aftermath ==
=== Investigation ===
While the case remains under investigation, Roger Garcia has been placed on administrative leave. As is standard with officer-involved shootings, the Oxnard Police Department will complete an investigation that will then be submitted to Ventura County District Attorney's Office. Following this, the District Attorney's Office will conduct its own investigation. A second officer who responded to the call with Garcia remains on duty. Garcia's name was released the Tuesday following the shooting, along with the 911 call made by Morado. Roger Garcia was involved in another, non-fatal, shooting of an Oxnard resident in February 2014. He had reportedly completed Crisis Intervention Team training after the February shooting. It was reported that August 18 The D.A.'s office found the shooting justified as Hockaday was charging at both the officer and her husband Luis Morado.

=== News coverage ===
The case was covered by local newspapers, and national magazines and entertainment outlets that are directed toward African American markets, such as Ebony and BET. The #SayHerName protest, created to raise awareness about police shootings of African American women and girls, renewed interest in Hockaday's case. Her death was mentioned in The Nation, Boing Boing, and The Independent.

=== Protests ===
On April 11, 2015, a peaceful march in honor of Meagan Hockaday took place primarily on Oxnard Boulevard. The march was broken up by police for disrupting traffic at the intersection of Oxnard Boulevard and Vineyard Avenue. A vigil was also held to commemorate Hockaday on the one-month anniversary of her death on April 28, 2015. It coincided with an Oxnard City Council meeting where supporters of Hockaday spoke out against police brutality in Oxnard. Speakers included Meagan Hockaday's sister. A benefit concert for Hockaday's family was held in Oxnard on May 9, 2015. Meagan Hockaday's name has also been included in lists of black women killed by police, read out during protests connected to the Black Lives Matter movement in 2015.
