= Murder of Mary Quigley =

Solved missing person's case in California

Mary Elizabeth Quigley
- Born: Mary Elizabeth Quigley; February 28, 1960; Tucson, Arizona, United States
- Died: September 10, 1977 (aged 17); Santa Clara, California, United States 37.341714, -121.943551 (crime scene and location of memorial)

Mary Elizabeth Quigley (February 28, 1960 – September 10, 1977) was an American murder victim whose death was a cold case for nearly 30 years before it was finally solved.

Mary was a senior at Santa Clara High School in California. She had attended a beer party and left late in the evening of Friday, September 9, 1977. Her body was found the next day approximately 300 yards away, hanging from a chain-link fence in Washington Park (now War Memorial Park) in Santa Clara. Coroner's evidence indicated that she had been raped and strangled.

Prosecutors were eventually able to use DNA profiling to identify her killer, Richard Archibeque, because of California's Proposition 69 which allowed the state to collect Archibeque's DNA for inclusion in its DNA Database as a result of his conviction two years later for the rape of another teenage girl.

== Discovery of the crime ==
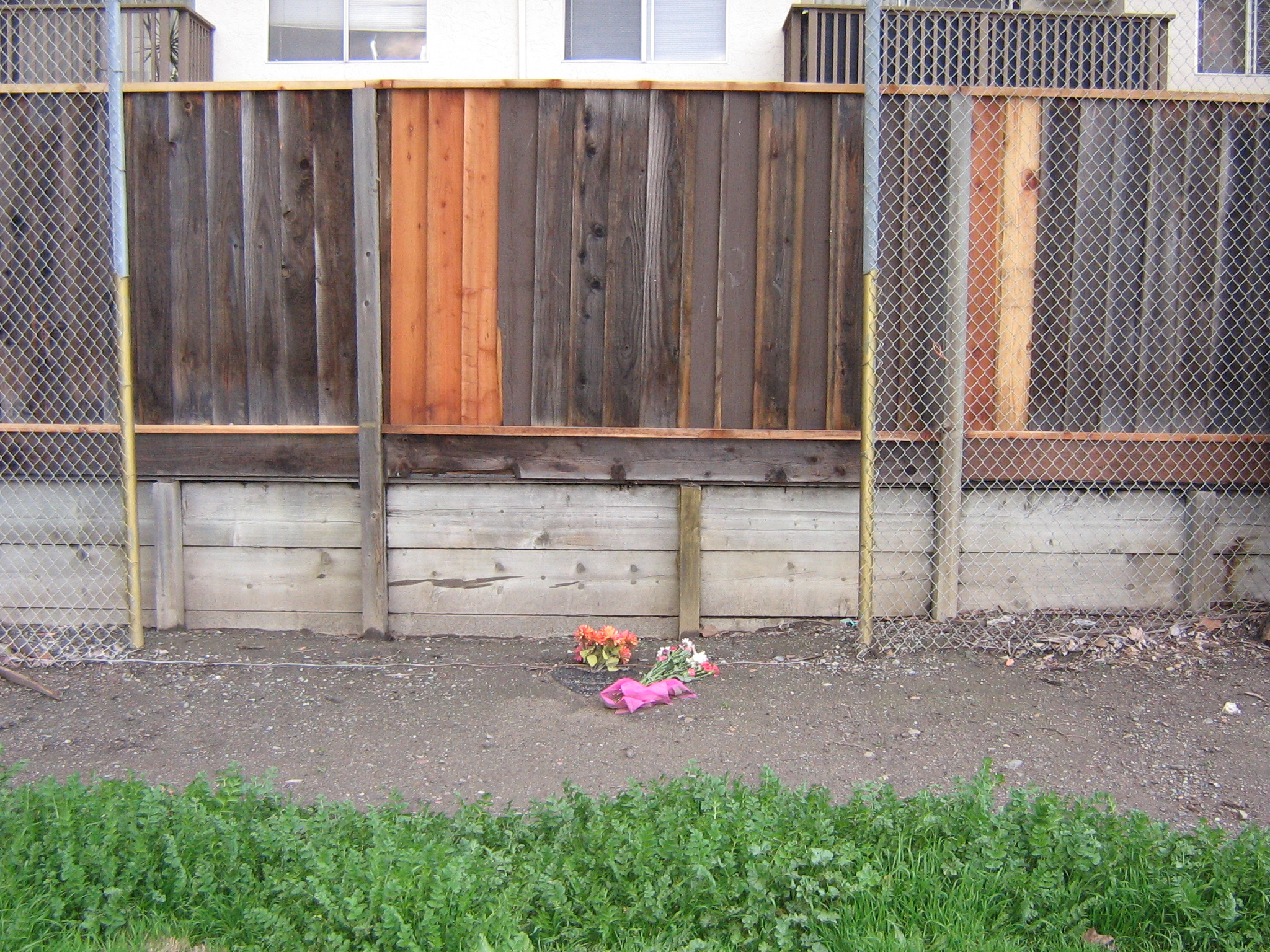
The crime scene in 2009

On the night of Friday, 9 September 1977, Quigley, a student at Santa Clara High School, attended a back-to-school beer party at a house near the corner of Monroe and Market Streets in Santa Clara, California.

An acquaintance had given her a ride to the party on the back of his motorcycle and had promised to offer her a ride home. However, he left the party and did not return until after Quigley had departed. Witnesses at the party last saw Quigley leaving the event around 11:45 p.m. alone and on foot, headed toward the house of a friend who lived nearby.

In the early daylight hours of the following morning, a groundskeeper noticed, at a distance, an object up against a fence that separated some apartments from the Santa Clara High School athletic field. Around noon of that same day the groundskeeper investigated further and discovered that the "object" was in fact the body of Mary Quigley.

Quigley's body was discovered nude. Debris on the body suggested that she had been dragged to the fence. She had been hung by the neck to the fence. An item of her clothing had been used to fasten her there.

== Aftermath ==
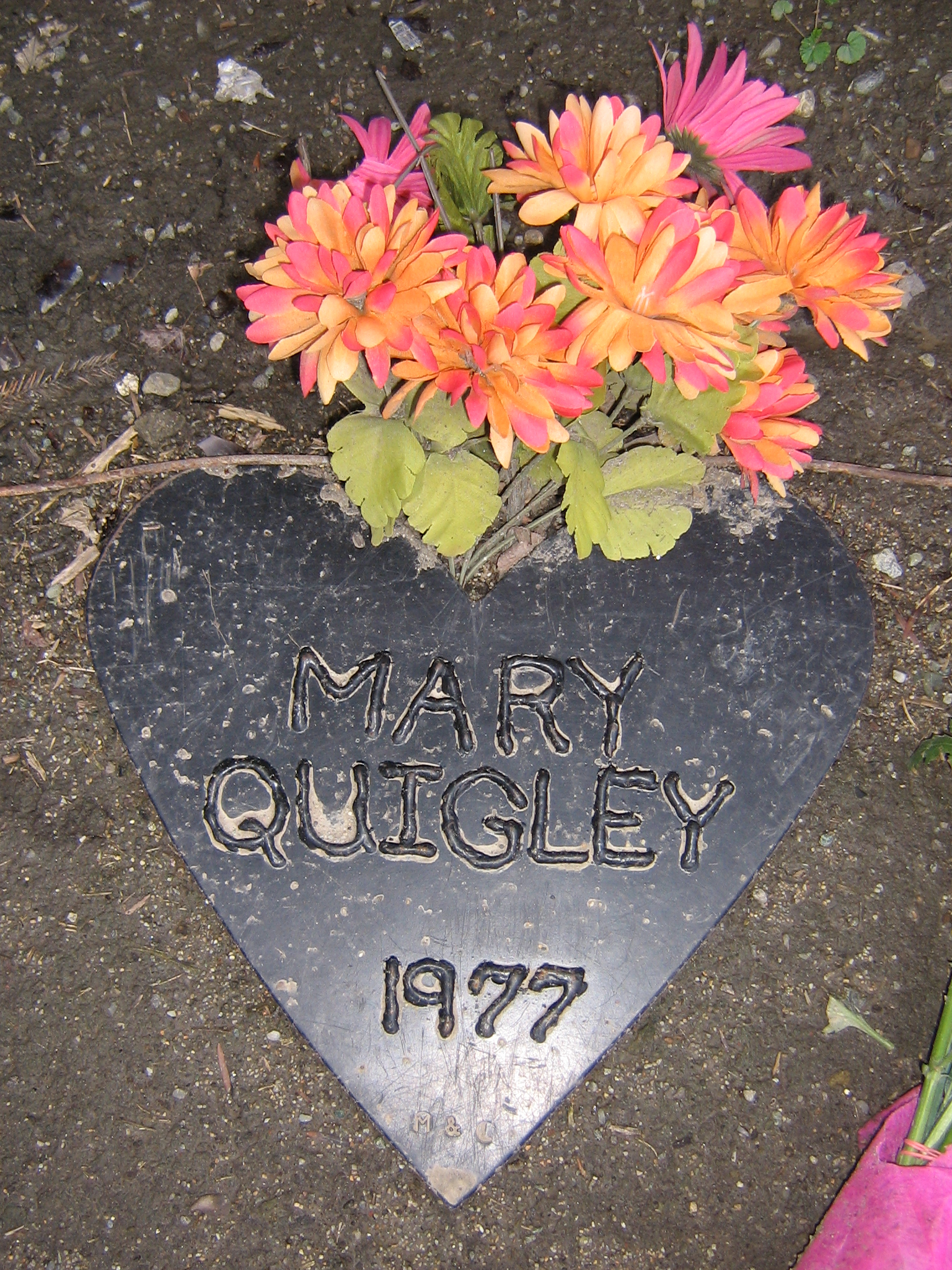
A plaque placed by friends at the crime scene

No immediate suspect was identified, and the murder eventually became a cold case. In 2005, Detective Sergeant Kazem resubmitted evidence from the Quigley homicide investigation to the Santa Clara County Crime Laboratory for DNA analysis. On December 27, 2006, the Crime Lab informed Sergeant Kazem that a computer database search of DNA profiles of known offenders identified a Santa Clara resident, Richard Armand Archibeque (age 47, DOB 01/26/59, a classmate of Quigley's), as the suspect. Later that day, Archibeque was arrested by detectives.

Archibeque was convicted of first degree murder in San Jose, California, on March 2, 2009 and was sentenced to 7 years to life in prison.

The immediate crime scene remains largely unchanged. The entire fence panel has been removed and a small plaque has been placed there. Quigley's friends and classmates have lobbied the City of Santa Clara for a memorial bench and plaque to be placed in her honor at War Memorial Playground. They also intend to rename the park Mary Quigley Memorial Playground.

=== Media coverage ===
Quigley's case was featured on the Investigation Discovery television show Murder Book on December 10, 2014.
