= Sacramento Mad Killer =

Unsolved serial murder case in the United States

- Other name: Sacramento-Sutter Mad Killer
- Years active: 1940–1941

Details
- Victims: 5–6+ killed 1 survived
- Country: United States
- State: California
- Date apprehended: N/A

Between 1940 and 1941, a series of unsolved murders occurred in the Sacramento metropolitan area, in which a minimum of five middle-aged men were killed. The "Mad Killer" responsible was never identified.

== Murders ==
In June 1940, an unidentified murder victim was found in a field in Sutter County. The exact cause of death was not known due to the body's advanced decomposition. Another unidentified body was found a few hundred yards away on August 31 the following year. It was believed that they were both murdered at the same time. Although it was speculated that these murders were connected to those committed in 1941, this was never proven.

On August 18, 1941, two men were found badly beaten in a field in Sacramento. One, Alfred Reed (Note: One source names him as "Frank Reed") of Davis, died eight days later in the hospital of a skull fracture. The other, John Saunders of Santa Barbara, was hospitalized with a pelvic fracture. Saunders later recovered but claimed to have no knowledge of what had happened or who his attacker was.

On August 27, the battered remains of 41-year-old Raymond Rivas were discovered in a Natomas basin. His head had been crushed, and his pockets were turned inside out. A close friend of Rivas, Tony Ochoa, was announced missing on September 3. Rivas and Ochoa had worked together on a farm in Clarksburg and recently moved to Sacramento together. Ochoa's last known contact with anyone was an interaction with detective A. J. Soulies, in which he informed Soulies that he would notify Rivas' parents in Mexico of his death. Contrary to this, another source claimed Ochoa was last seen on August 24, 1941, three days prior to the discovery of Rivas' remains. Investigators stated that there was no evidence of Ochoa being involved in Rivas' death.

On September 21, a body was recovered from the Sacramento River in Hood. The chin of the man's skull had a hole, which was either a bullet wound or a result of decomposition. Due to the flesh of his face being eaten away by fish, the cause of death and identity of the decedent were not able to be determined. It was estimated that the man was about 55 years old and had been in the water for two weeks.

According to authorities, the victims had each been picked up at bars (or in Sacramento's West End) and driven to isolated locations, where they were subsequently robbed and murdered. However, robbery was not suggested as a primary motive; authorities stated that it was more likely that the attacks were the works of an "insane murderer or a degenerate". Law enforcement investigated a lead that the perpetrator may have been a paroled convict from Oakland, though it is unknown if anything came of this. Several other suspects, including one arrested for severely beating an elderly man, were questioned and let go. In September 1941, reporting on the investigation abruptly stopped, and the perpetrator was never identified.

== See also ==
- List of serial killers in the United States
