= Murder of the Bologna family =

Murder of American family by Salvadoran gang member

The murder of the Bologna family occurred on June 22, 2008, when Tony Bologna and his sons, Michael and Matthew, were shot dead near their residence in the Excelsior district of San Francisco, California, United States, by Edwin Ramos, who mistook the victims as rival gang members for whom he wanted retaliation.

After news reports revealed that Ramos was living in the U.S. illegally and was not deported despite a prior criminal conviction, this murder became an example of criticisms of San Francisco's sanctuary city policy and U.S. immigration policy in general.

== Murder ==
On June 22, 2008, Tony Bologna (age 49) and his sons, Michael and Matthew (ages 20 and 16, respectively), were shot dead near their residence in the Excelsior district of San Francisco as they returned home in the afternoon from a family barbecue in Fairfield. Bologna was on his way home to rest before reporting to his job as night manager at a supermarket later that afternoon. Another one of Tony's sons was critically injured. Jaxon Van Derbeken of the San Francisco Chronicle reported the incident initially as one of road rage where the shooter reacted to the Bolognas' car blocking his own. Tony and Michael died at the scene; Matthew died June 24 at San Francisco General Hospital. Then on June 25, Edwin Ramos (age 21) was arrested at his home in El Sobrante and booked without bail.

== Perpetrator ==
Edwin Ramos
- Born: Edwin Ramos Umaña; October 12, 1986 (age 40); El Salvador
- Occupation: Gang member
- Motive: Retaliation for an unrelated attack earlier that day on MS-13 members in San Francisco’s Mission District. An attack allegedly perpetrated by Norteno street gang members, a known MS-13 rival. Despite significant and obvious evidence suggesting the family was unaffiliated with any gang or criminal syndicate, Ramos claimed after apprehension that he saw the family and believed them to be active Norteno gang members.
- Convictions: assault (2003), attempted robbery (2004); triple murder and attempted murder (2012)
- Criminal charges: murder (with enhancement for multiple victims and gang membership)
- Penalty: probation for both 2003 and 2004 crimes; held in a shelter from late 2003 to April 2, 2004 and released to parent's custody, put back in shelter after conviction for second crime from June 2004 to February 2005; three life terms without parole starting June 11, 2012

Edwin Ramos was born in 1986 in El Salvador, where he was raised by his grandmother. In 2000, Ramos entered the United States on a temporary visa to live with his mother and two siblings; however, Ramos stayed in the U.S. after the visa expired. On April 2, 2004, San Francisco Juvenile Court sentenced Ramos to probation, after convictions on assault and street gang membership for beating and kicking a man on a Muni bus on October 22, 2003. Four days after sentencing, he assaulted a pregnant woman and her brother. Ramos was convicted of attempted robbery and served probation at the city-run Log Cabin Ranch from June 2004 to February 2005.

After his release, he lived with his mother's sister. He applied for temporary residency but was declined; by then federal authorities had learned that Ramos was in the U.S. illegally. Ramos then married a woman who was a U.S. citizen, applied for permanent resident status, and took a job in construction.

In 2006, former MS-13 leader turned informant Jaime Martinez told the FBI that Ramos killed 21-year-old Norteño gang member Rolando "Chino" Valldares in the Mission District of San Francisco.

Having been a member of the 20th Street MS-13 gang in San Francisco, Ramos later moved to El Sobrante and joined MS-13 ally Pasadena Loco Sureños (PLS). On March 30, 2008, Ramos was arrested after police discovered his car had illegally tinted windows, no license plate, and a passenger named Erick Lopez who tried to conceal a gun that police found was used in a double killing. According to the police report, Ramos cooperated with police, but Lopez ran away but was later caught and arrested. Police had "numerous documented contacts" with Ramos and Lopez and identified both as active MS-13 gang members. Prosecutors declined to charge Ramos due to lack of evidence that he knew about the gun. San Francisco sheriff's deputies called Immigration and Customs Enforcement (ICE) to determine if the department wanted to hold Ramos in custody, but ICE declined.

== Victims ==
Anthony "Tony" Bologna (April 26, 1960 – June 22, 2008) was an Italian American native of San Francisco who graduated from Balboa High School. At the time of his murder, Tony Bologna worked as a night shift supervisor at Draeger's, a supermarket in San Mateo, and was a youth basketball and baseball coach.

His widow, Danielle Bologna, was also from San Francisco. Her father was an undocumented immigrant from Mexico who gained legal authorization from the 1986 amnesty, and her mother was an immigrant from Nicaragua.

Tony and Danielle Bologna married in 1987 after a six-year relationship. They had four children. Their eldest son, Michael, was a student at College of San Mateo on his death, having earlier graduated from Abraham Lincoln High School.

Placed in a witness protection program, Danielle Bologna and her surviving children moved away from San Francisco and were given new identities.

In 2023, Danielle Bologna, now 62, and her 25-year-old daughter Francesca were killed in an automobile accident.

== Trial ==
Preliminary hearings were held in June 2009. The only survivor of the shooting identified Ramos as the shooter. In September 2009, the San Francisco Chronicle reported that Douglas Largaespada, an alleged MS-13 member, claimed that Ramos killed the Bolognas. Marvin Medina, who was injured in a shooting hours before the Bolognas were shot, testified in court in exchange for prosecutorial immunity. He repeatedly denied knowing Ramos or other MS-13 gang members; prosecutors questioned Medina to determine whether Ramos was seeking retaliation for the shooting of Medina in killing the Bolognas. However, Medina could not explain text messages sent from his phone to Ramos.

On June 24, Sergeant Mario Molina, a San Francisco police officer who was an expert on Latino gangs, testified that Ramos thought the Bolognas were rival Norteños gang members. San Francisco Superior Court Judge Teri Jackson ruled on June 29 that Ramos would stand trial for three counts of murder, and Ramos pleaded not guilty on July 13. According to Sgt. Molina, Ramos stated that his friend Wilfredo "Flaco" Reyes, whom police identified as a leader of MS-13, shot the Bolognas. San Francisco District Attorney Kamala Harris sought a maximum sentence of life in prison without parole rather than the death penalty should Ramos be convicted. Mayor Newsom supported Harris's decision.

Harry Dorfman and George Butterworth represented the prosecution; Marla Zamora represented Ramos in court. Judge Jackson removed Ramos's previous lead defense attorney Robert Amparan on January 7 because Amparan was representing Douglas Largaespada at the time.

Marvin Medina admitted on December 1, 2009, that he had lied on the stand six months earlier and could not explain how Ramos obtained his cell-phone number. Additionally, Medina identified Reyes as the shooter of the Bolognas. When prosecutors attempted to check for a gang-related tattoo, Medina admitted that he was a former MS-13 member. As a result, Medina pleaded guilty to three counts of perjury regarding his claims that he had not known Reyes, that he had met Ramos only once before the preliminary hearings, and that he was alone when he was shot in 2008. Having been in jail since the preliminary hearings ended, Medina was sentenced to three years of probation on January 12, 2010, with credit for time served but remained held on $1 million bail as a material witness.

In May 2012, a jury in San Francisco convicted Ramos of killing the Bolognas and attempting to murder a surviving member of the family. Judge Charles Haines sentenced Ramos to 183 years to life without parole on June 11, 2012.

Ramos appealed his case. "On appeal, he contends the court erred by admitting the following evidence at trial: (1) defendant’s allegedly involuntary incriminating statements made during extended police interrogation, (2) the lay opinion of the investigating police officer that defendant, rather than an accomplice, was the shooter, and (3) excessive, cumulative and prejudicial testimony about defendant’s membership and participation in a criminal street gang." The California Court of Appeal for the First District upheld Ramos's convictions but ordered a sentencing correction on August 20, 2014.

Reyes was arrested in Salisbury, North Carolina, and extradited to California in 2012. Initially, he pleaded not guilty. However, in 2015, Reyes pleaded guilty to criminal street gang membership and firing at an occupied vehicle. On July 10 that year, San Francisco Superior Court sentenced Reyes to ten years in state prison as part of this plea deal.

== Aftermath ==
=== Effects on sanctuary city policy ===
Tony Bologna's widow Danielle and other relatives of the slain family members blamed San Francisco's sanctuary city policies for the crime. The policy "bars city officials from cooperating with federal crackdowns on illegal immigrants." On July 2, nearly a week after the murder of the Bolognas, San Francisco Mayor Gavin Newsom amended the sanctuary city policy to allow the city to refer juvenile illegal alien felons to federal authorities for deportation. Members of the Minuteman Project, a group of private citizens who patrol the Mexico – United States border against illegal aliens, held a protest at San Francisco City Hall on July 30 denouncing the sanctuary city policy and calling for Mayor Newsom to resign. Jesse McKinley of The New York Times cited the Ramos case as among several negative consequences of San Francisco's sanctuary policy. Danielle Bologna advocated for District Attorney Kamala Harris to seek the death penalty for Ramos, but Harris pledged never to seek capital punishment for any criminal case.

=== Bologna's civil suit against San Francisco ===
On August 22, 2008, Danielle Bologna and other family members sued San Francisco, claiming that its sanctuary city policy contributed significantly to the three deaths. The city removed Bologna's civil suit to federal court because Bologna's case involved violations of federal constitutional rights, and Judge Susan Illston ruled on September 14, 2009, that Bologna could sue San Francisco in state court. Judge Charlotte Woolard of San Francisco Superior Court ruled on February 22, 2010, that the city couldn't be liable for any crimes that Edwin Ramos committed post-release because the city had no information that Ramos posed a specific threat to the Bolognas and that the sanctuary city policy was intended "to improve immigration controls" rather than prevent crime.

=== Use in political campaigning ===
Harris would eventually be elected as Vice President of the United States in 2020 and nominated as the Democratic Party candidate for the 2024 United States presidential election. In August 2024, a video ad by the Make America Great Again Inc. political action committee, in support of Republican challenger Donald Trump, criticized Harris for not seeking the death penalty against Ramos and for declining to prosecute Ramos on gun charges in the months before the murder.

Then on September 12, 2024, at a fundraising event in Rancho Palos Verdes, California, Trump criticized Harris's prosecutions of Ramos and other undocumented immigrants.
