= Killing of Deandre Brunston =

2003 police shooting in Compton, California

Shooting of Deandre Brunston
- Date: August 24, 2003
- Time: 9:00 p.m.
- Location: 2431 E. 126th St, Compton, California, U.S.
- Participants: Deandre Brunston (fatality); Glenn Emery, Lt. Patrick Maxwell and Sgt. Earnest Burwell (police officers)
- Outcome: No charges
- Litigation: $340,000 settlement from Los Angeles County for Brunston's family

The shooting of Deandre "Trey" Brunston, a 24-year-old African-American, occurred in Compton, Los Angeles County, California, on August 24, 2003. He was shot 22 times by Los Angeles County Sheriff's deputies, who fired 81 rounds. In 2006, Brunston's family settled with the county for $340,000 after filing a lawsuit, accusing the sheriff's deputies of causing wrongful death.

== Incident ==
At the time he was being sought for questioning from an alleged domestic abuse incident after his girlfriend called 9-1-1. After initially evading the police, Brunston was cornered in a nearby doorway where he and the officers tried to negotiate. He repeatedly told the officers he was wanted for murder (which was false), would rather die right there than go back to prison, and that he was armed and would shoot a police dog and the deputies if the dog was released or they fired first. However he had no gun but had a flip-flop sandal in his right hand hidden under his T-shirt. Brunston repeatedly stated that he would throw the "gun" down and surrender if he were allowed to speak to his girlfriend, Fonda Brown, who he said was pregnant with his child, but his request was never granted.

At this point, many officers had their guns drawn and trained on Brunston. Lt. Patrick Maxwell had been contacted via cell phone while he was at a party in a drunken state. He ordered the dog to be released to attack Brunston. The senior K9 officer on the scene, Sgt. Earnest Burwell, refused to release the dog, claiming that releasing under those circumstances would violate the existing use-of-force policy. Burwell was replaced with a rookie K9 unit who made no such claims. The dog was released and Brunston refused to put the "gun" down when ordered to do so, instead yelling back to officers. He later threw it down when the dog was within a few feet of him, however the police had already decided to fire at that point and he was shot at less than a second afterwards. Before the dog reached Brunston, deputies opened fire. The dog was hit by police bullets and fell a split second before it reached Brunston, who had taken one step in retreat from the dog. Within the next five seconds, deputies had discharged 81 shots, seriously wounding Brunston, who later died of his injuries. The dog was also killed during the incident.

Adding to the controversy of this shooting is the disparity in medical treatment—the wounded police dog received an emergency helicopter airlift from the scene to a veterinary center in Norwalk (where it died later) -- while Brunston was left bleeding to death on the concrete steps, leading to allegations of Brunston receiving sub-par treatment as compared to the dog.

No gun was found on or near Brunston. The incident was captured on police video and posted on numerous websites. The videotape was used in the lawsuit to support that the police had acted in haste.

== Aftermath ==
Deandre Brunston's aunt, Keisha Brunston, brought a wrongful death lawsuit against the Los Angeles County Sheriff's Department in response to the killing. They alleged the deputies could have easily prevented the death, were poorly trained in these situations and were 'trigger-happy'. Charges against the deputies were dropped and the suit focused on the supervisors and training. The judge ruled that suit could still charge against the animal's handler and supervisors including civil rights violations, false arrest and "negligent hiring, training and supervision." An order to release the police dog was allegedly given over a phone from an off-duty supervisor, who had been drinking. The family's attorney noted that the officers present seemed to act in haste as a crisis team with a trained negotiator was en route to the scene and would have determined whether the young man was bluffing. The family later settled with the county for $340,000 in March 2006. Brunston's mother, Brenda Gaines, was awarded $122,500 with his three children also receiving sums. The county also was ordered to pay $105,000 in legal fees. Several deputies were also given two- to five-day suspensions for shooting when not designated as on-site shooters.

Deandre Brunston has become a symbol against police brutality. Keisha Brunston spoke at a War and Racism Forum in 2005 in Los Angeles. His picture was held in a march in Atlanta, GA in 2007 for the U.S. Social Forum. Brunston's family also spoke at a 2008 vigil for Muhammad Usman Chaudhry, an autistic Pakistani American, who was wrongfully killed by an LAPD officer.
