= Alatyr, Nizhny Novgorod Oblast =

Rural locality in Nizhny Novgorod Oblast, Russia

Coordinates: 54°49′38″N 43°43′32″E

Alatyr (Russian: Ала́тырь) is a rural locality (a village) under the administrative jurisdiction of the town of oblast significance of Pervomaysk of Nizhny Novgorod Oblast, Russia.
