= Killing of Savannah Graziano =

2022 police killing in California, United States

- Date: September 27, 2022
- Time: ≈ 11:00 a.m. (PST)
- Location: Hesperia, California; 34.4266°N 117.3820°W
- Deaths: 3 total; 2 during the shootout and 1 prior

On September 27, 2022, 15-year-old Savannah Graziano and her 45-year-old father Anthony were shot and killed by deputies from the San Bernardino County Sheriff's Department during a shootout in Hesperia, California. A day prior, Anthony Graziano had killed his estranged wife, Savannah's mother. Video of the shooting showed deputies shooting Savannah, who was unarmed, as she followed a deputy's instructions to move towards him. She was wearing body-armor at the time of the shootout, which was unclear at the time of the original video’s release.

== Events ==
=== Murder of Tracy Martinez ===
On September 26, Anthony Graziano fatally shot Tracy Martinez, his estranged wife and Savannah's mother, outside her house in Fontana, California. Witnesses reported seeing Savannah sitting in the back of her father's pick-up truck during the shooting. After killing Martinez, Anthony fired at a vehicle outside a nearby school, then drove north with Savannah. An Amber alert was issued for Savannah Graziano following Martinez's murder.

=== Shootout ===
A 911 caller reported seeing Anthony Graziano's vehicle in the Barstow area the morning of September 27. Deputies pursued the truck on the highway for around 45 minutes, during which several shots were fired from it towards officers. The sheriff's department stated that Anthony fired at police, and that Savannah may also have. Anthony's vehicle became disabled in the Hesperia area and a shootout began. During the shootout, Savannah, who was unarmed, exited the vehicle from the passenger's side and ran towards deputies. A deputy yelled for Savannah to come towards him, but upon doing so several other deputies fired at her. The first deputy yelled "Hey! Stop! Stop shooting her! He's in the car!" Anthony was also killed in the shootout.

Following the shootout, San Bernardino Sherriff Shannon Dicus said Savannah Grazino was a "participant in shooting at our deputies." Police also claimed Savannah was wearing what looked to be a helmet and body armor, but video footage of the incident was unclear.

== Investigation ==
The California Department of Justice investigated the shooting per a state law that requires the agency to investigate all police shootings where unarmed civilians are killed. In 2025, California Attorney General Rob Bonta cleared the San Bernardino County Sheriff’s Department of any wrongdoing.

== See also ==
- 2014 Stockton bank robbery
- 2018 Los Angeles hostage incident
- 2019 Miramar shootout
