= Crime in Los Angeles =

Los Angeles
- Crime rates* (2022)

Violent crimes
- Homicide: 9.9
- Rape: 36.2
- Robbery: 236.2
- Aggravated assault: 519.1
- Total violent crime: 801.5

Property crimes
- Burglary: 380.9
- Motor vehicle theft: 669.8
- Total property crime: 3,434.6
- Note: Reported crimes per 100,000 population Source: LAPD COMPSTAT

Crime in Los Angeles has varied throughout time, reaching peaks between the 1980s and 1990s.

In 2012, the Los Angeles Police Department reported that crime had declined in the city for the 10th consecutive year.

In 2014, there were 260 homicides, at a rate of 6.7 per 100,000 people.

In 2015, it was revealed that the LAPD had been under-reporting crime for eight years, making the crime rate in the city appear much lower than it really is. Approximately 14,000 assaults went unreported as "minor offenses" rather than violent crimes. However, these inaccuracies do not affect the general downward trend in crime in Los Angeles.

The city is patrolled by the Los Angeles Police Department. California Highway Patrol and Los Angeles County Sheriff's Department also assist.

== Zoot Suit Riots (1943) ==
The Zoot Suit Riots were a series of riots on June 3–8, 1943 in Los Angeles, California, United States, involving American servicemen stationed in Southern California and young Latino and Mexican American city residents. American servicemen and white Angelenos attacked and stripped children, teenagers, and youths who wore zoot suits, ostensibly because they considered the outfits, which were made from large amounts of fabric, to be unpatriotic during World War II. Rationing of fabrics and certain foods was required at the time for the war effort. While most of the violence was directed toward Mexican American youth, African American, and Filipino American youths who were wearing zoot suits were also attacked. The Zoot Suit Riots were related to fears and hostilities aroused by the coverage of the Sleepy Lagoon murder trial, following the killing of a young Latino man in what was then an unincorporated commercial area near Los Angeles.

== Battle of Sunset Strip (1947–1956) ==
After the death of Benjamin "Bugsy" Siegel, his chief lieutenant Mickey Cohen took over his remaining gambling and loan shark operations in Los Angeles. Cohen refused to fall in line behind reigning crime boss Jack Dragna and Dragna saw this as an opportunity to eliminate him as Cohen began to create his own crime family that quickly began to rival Dragna's. Dragna first began recruiting Cohen's Italian men such as Dominic Brooklier to his family and killing his other men such as David Ogul, Frank Niccoli, Neddie Herbert, and Harold "Hooky" Rothman. However, through sheer luck, Cohen survived many attempts on his life (John Roselli compared Cohen to Bugs Moran). In 1951, Cohen was imprisoned for tax evasion and the L.A. family moved in on his gambling business.

The number of high-profile murders and gangsters moving into the West Coast, combined with the recall of Mayor Frank L. Shaw because of corruption charges related to organized crime, caused law enforcement to stop accommodating the Mafia. In the late 1930s, California Attorney General Earl Warren took command of a tough assault on Dragna's empire, most notably shutting down the gambling ships run by Anthony Cornero. On February 14, 1950, the California Commission on Organized Crime singled out Dragna as the head of a crime syndicate that controlled crime in Southern California. Soon after, several of his family members were arrested for the bombing of Mickey Cohen's home. Dragna fled the state and was wanted for questioning. He later surrendered, and was questioned in the Kefauver hearings along with Roselli and Bompensiero, but denied all accusations against him. Dragna's family however, remained strong throughout the early 1950s.

== Watts Riots (1965) ==
The Watts riots, sometimes referred to as the Watts Rebellion or Watts Uprising, took place in the Watts neighborhood and its surrounding areas of Los Angeles from August 11 to 16, 1965.

On August 11, 1965, Marquette Frye, a 21-year-old African American man, was pulled over for drunken driving. After he failed a field sobriety test, officers attempted to arrest him. Marquette resisted arrest, with assistance from his mother, Rena Frye, and a physical confrontation ensued in which Marquette was struck in the face with a baton. Meanwhile, a crowd of onlookers had gathered. Rumors spread that the police had kicked a pregnant woman who was present at the scene. Six days of civil unrest followed, motivated in part by allegations of police abuse. Nearly 14,000 members of the California Army National Guard helped suppress the disturbance, which resulted in 34 deaths and over $40 million in property damage. It was the city's worst unrest until the Rodney King riots of 1992.

== The crack epidemic (1984–1990) ==
Crack cocaine first began to be used on a massive scale in Los Angeles in 1984. Between February and July 1984 cocaine abuse and related violence had exploded to unprecedented levels throughout the city, and by 1985, crack was available in most major American cities. South Central, where the crack cocaine epidemic was among the worst in the country, became the site of numerous police raids. Previously unknown gangs were growing and new ones were emerging. The rap music genre, TV shows and movies portrayed that part of Los Angeles as a no-go zone and a highly violent area.

== 1992 Riots ==
The 1992 Los Angeles riots, sometimes called the 1992 Los Angeles uprising, were a series of riots and civil disturbances that occurred in Los Angeles County in April and May 1992. Unrest began in South Central Los Angeles on April 29, after a jury acquitted four officers of the Los Angeles Police Department (LAPD) charged with using excessive force in the arrest and beating of Rodney King. This incident had been videotaped and widely shown in television broadcasts.

The rioting took place in several areas in the Los Angeles metropolitan area as thousands of people rioted over six days following the verdict's announcement. Widespread looting, assault, and arson occurred during the riots, which local police forces had difficulty controlling due to lack of personnel and resources. The situation in the Los Angeles area was resolved only after the California National Guard, United States military, and several federal law enforcement agencies deployed more than 5,000 federal troops to assist in ending the violence and unrest.

When the riots ended, 63 people had been killed, 2,383 had been injured, more than 12,000 had been arrested, and estimates of property damage were over $1 billion. Koreatown, where the bulk of the rioting in South Central Los Angeles occurred, received disproportionately more damage than surrounding areas. LAPD Chief of Police Daryl Gates, who had already announced his resignation by the time of the riots, was attributed with much of the blame for failure to de-escalate the situation and overall mismanagement.

== North Hollywood shootout (1997) ==
The 1997 North Hollywood shootout was an armed confrontation between two heavily armed and armored bank robbers, Larry Eugene Phillips, Jr. and Emil Mătăsăreanu, and patrol and SWAT officers of the Los Angeles Police Department in North Hollywood, California on February 28, 1997. It occurred when responding patrol officers engaged Phillips and Mătăsăreanu leaving the robbed bank. Seventeen officers and civilians were wounded before both robbers were killed. Phillips and Mătăsăreanu had previously robbed several banks prior to their attempt in North Hollywood and were notorious for their heavy armament, which included automatic rifles.

== C.R.A.S.H. and the Rampart Scandal (1997/1998) ==
The Community Resources Against Street Hoodlums (C.R.A.S.H.) was a specialized unit of the Los Angeles Police Department (LAPD) tasked with combating gang-related crime. CRASH was established in South Central in 1979 to combat the rising problem of gangs in the city. Each of the LAPD's 21 divisions had a CRASH unit assigned to it, whose primary goal was to suppress the influx of gang-related crimes in Los Angeles, which came about primarily from the increase in illegal drug trade.

The Rampart scandal involved widespread police corruption in CRASH in the late 1990s. More than 70 police officers either assigned to or associated with the unit were implicated in various forms of misconduct, including unprovoked shootings, unprovoked beatings, planting of false evidence, stealing and dealing narcotics, bank robbery, perjury, and the covering up of evidence of these activities.

The scandal constituted one of the most widespread cases of documented police corruption in U.S. history. The investigation, based mainly on statements of admitted corrupt CRASH officer Rafael Pérez, initially implicated over 70 officers in wrongdoing. Of those officers, enough evidence was found to bring 58 before an internal administrative board. However, only 24 were actually found to have committed any wrongdoing, with twelve given suspensions of various lengths, seven forced into resignation or retirement, and five terminated.

As a result of the probe into falsified evidence and police perjury, 106 prior criminal convictions were overturned. The scandal resulted in more than 140 civil lawsuits against the city of Los Angeles, California, costing the city an estimated $125 million in settlements.

== The Los Angeles May Day mêlée (2007) ==
The 2007 MacArthur Park rallies were two May Day rallies demanding amnesty for undocumented immigrants which occurred on May 1, 2007, at MacArthur Park, in Los Angeles. When the protest overflowed onto city streets, police drove motorcycles through the crowd, then ordered the crowd to disperse. Some people began throwing plastic bottles and rocks at officers. Members of the Los Angeles Police Department in riot gear then used batons and rubber bullets in a manner later found by the LAPD's own investigation, as well as by the courts, to be excessive. After community mobilization, pressure from the Mayor, and an extensive internal review, LAPD Chief William Bratton apologized, the commanding officer was demoted, seventeen other officers faced penalties, and the LAPD paid more than $13 million in damages.

== South Central L.A. ==
South Los Angeles, formally known as South Central Los Angeles is a notoriously dangerous region of the City of Los Angeles which has had an extensive history of gang violence started in the 1920s with white gangs being replaced by black and Hispanic gangs for decades. However gang activity and crime did rapidly decline in the entire South Los Angeles region during the late-2000s-2010s until more recently in 2021, Los Angeles recorded the most homicides they’ve ever had in the city since 2006. The COVID-19 crisis was predominantly a reason for a spike in gang warfare and violent crime across South LA and other U.S. cities.

South Central had become a byword for urban decay; its former bad reputation was spread by numerous movies such as Colors, South Central, Menace II Society, Poetic Justice, Friday, Training Day, Baby Boy, Dirty, Gridiron Gang, Waist Deep, Street Kings, End of Watch, and in particular, South Central native John Singleton's Boyz n the Hood, including drama series such as Southland and Snowfall had continued the poor image. Those images of South Central; along with Long Beach, Compton, and even Watts; had been portrayed in West Coast Gangsta Rap and G-Funk songs, as well as in video games such as Grand Theft Auto: San Andreas and Grand Theft Auto V.

=== Crips and Bloods feud ===
After the FBI cracked down on black political organizations in the late 1960s, a social vacuum formed among black adolescents living in former South Central Los Angeles. Into this vacuum came two new gangs: the Crips and the Bloods. Conflict immediately arose between the two rival gangs. In the next 40 years, fighting between the two gangs took more than 15,000 lives to date. The cause of the feud is best expressed as a "kill or be killed" culture described by T. Rodgers of the Black P Stones, as "You better respect me. You better fear me." Speaking in a 2007 film documentary, a former Crip, named Pete, who survived to his middle years, said,

These wars go farther back than most of these kids been around. A lot of 'em [are] not sure about why the war was goin' on. They [simply] STARTED DOIN' WHAT WAS BEIN' DONE.

The problem began with poverty and segregation, but had worsened with drugs, family separation and parental incarceration. The key to improving things, according to former LA mayor Antonio Villaraigosa, is education.

=== Social impact ===
A 2003 comparison of twin psychological studies by the Lancet and Rand corporations discovered that the average child in South Los Angeles exhibits greater levels of post-traumatic stress disorder than children of a similar age in war-torn Baghdad, Iraq.

== San Fernando Valley ==
Although not as well documented as other regions of Los Angeles, the San Fernando Valley minority community has been plagued by gang-related crime and violence. Crimes related to gang violence have generally declined over the mid-2000s however, since 2014, gang-related crime has increased in the west San Fernando Valley by 63% according to Charles Crumpley, publisher and editor of the San Fernando Valley Business Journal. In order to combat the gang violence, the Los Angeles Police Department launched a campaign of gang injunctions across the Valley. Gang injunction is a variation of a restraining order issued by U.S. courts that prohibits gang members in a certain area from participating in specific activities.

=== Early '90s to Mid 2000s: Gang Injunctions and its Implications ===
At the turn of the century, gang-related crime that includes murder, robbery, rape, burglary, aggravated assault, larceny and theft, were a frequent occurrence in the San Fernando Valley. In order to combat the increase in violent crimes, the Los Angeles Police Department's Foothill Division deployed a campaign of gang injunction across the Valley. In April 1993, the department embarked on the Blythe Street gang injunction that encompassed sections of the Devonshire and Van Nuys police divisions. Although not made permanent until February 2000, between 1993 and 2001, there have been a total of 60 arrests; 40 of which were related to a direct violation of the injunction and the rest were indirect arrests due to the discovery of another crime while investigating a violation of the injunction. The gang injunctions in the early 2000s were successful in reducing violent crimes in the San Fernando Valley however, many are convinced that the injunctions against the gangs of the Valley are the reason for the expansion of gang-related crimes in surrounding areas.

After the injunction of the Blythe Street Gang in April 1993, a 45-page report released by the American Civil Liberties Union of Southern California stating that even though the rate of violent crimes were reduced in the Blythe Street neighborhood, the injunction had contributed to the spread of gang-related crime in the surrounding neighborhoods of the San Fernando Valley. The critics of gang injunctions argued that these procedures ultimately created a stronger sense of gang cohesiveness, a heightened resentment toward law enforcement, and spread gang members into surrounding neighborhoods resulting in higher violent crime rates in those neighborhoods. However, these reports were met by a cold shoulder from law enforcement, especially from Assistant City Attorney, Martin Vranicar Jr., the city's top gang prosecutor at the time. Los Angeles Police Lt. Fred Tuller further shut down the reports by expressing to the media that these methods had worked in the Valley and the crimes associated with the Blythe Street Gang had decreased in the area. Since the mid-2000s, gang-related crime has decreased 5–10% without major spill-over into other neighborhoods but has spiked since 2014 according to the Los Angeles Police Department.

=== 2014 to 2016 ===
After a period of steady declines in gang-related crime during the 2000s, the San Fernando Valley experienced one of the lowest periods of violent crimes from 2012 to 2014. However, the Los Angeles Police Department has reported that violent, gang-related crimes has increased by 63% from 2014 to 2015. The cause for the cycle of crime might be attributed to a number of different factors that may include money, narcotics sales, or the release of a prolific gang member from prison looking to recruit members for his crew. Gang-related murders in LAPD's Devonshire, Topanga and West Valley's division more than doubled from 3 in 2014 to 8 in 2016 with the Topanga division experiencing the sharpest increase. The Topanga division reported 0 homicides in 2014 compared to 5 gang-related homicides reported in 2015. In the West San Fernando Valley, there were a total of 848 gang-related crimes in 2016, which is a 33% increase from crimes reported in 2014.

== Smuggling ==
During the prohibition era the waters of the South Coast were a popular smuggling route in for alcohol. Largely forgotten in the later parts of the 20th Century, with increased security at the Mexico–United States border smuggling has increased; during the 2011 fiscal year, more than 200 smuggling vessels were observed. Most of the vessels attempt to off load their cargo of drugs and/or illegal immigrants in San Diego County, however destinations are as far north as the California Central Coast. Often, vessels used for smuggling operations are abandoned upon making landfall.

== Homicides per year ==
Year	Murders
1991	1025
1992	1092
1993	1077
1994	850
1995	838
1996	709
1997	576
1998	426
1999	425
2000	550
2001	588
2002	654
2003	515

Year	Murders
2004	518
2005	489
2006	480
2007	395
2008	384
2009	312
2010	293
2011	297
2012	299
2013	251
2014	260
2015	283
2016	294

Year	Murders
2017	282
2018	258
2018	258
2020	355
2021	402
2022	382
2023	327

== See also ==
- Crime in California
- List of California street gangs
- List of criminal gangs in Los Angeles
- Los Angeles County Sheriff's Department
- Los Angeles Police Department
