= Murder of Patricia Alatorre =

California murder case

- Date: July 2, 2020
- Cause: Strangulation
- Perpetrator: Armando Cruz
- Deaths: Patricia Alatorre
- Burial: Greenlawn Cemetery, Bakersfield, California; July 25, 2020
- Charges: 12 charges including first-degree murder, kidnapping, rape and aggravated sexual assault of a minor
- Trial: July 7, 2020 – October 4, 2022
- Verdict: Pleaded guilty
- Sentence: Life imprisonment without possibility of parole

Patricia Jocelyn Alatorre (May 14, 2007 – July 2, 2020) was a teenager from Bakersfield, California, who was raped and murdered after disappearing on July 1, 2020. Alatorre and her killer met through social media and shared explicit photos of themselves, with the suspect convincing Alatorre to meet up on two occasions. On the second meeting, Alatorre was raped and strangled to death, with the killer having sex with the body before burning it. Armando Cruz was arrested after police found a white pick up truck similar to the one used during the kidnapping. Alatorre's rape and death has been described by the Bakersfield Police Department as one of the worst missing children cases they have ever had.

After the murder, residents near the area held a vigil and memorial for Alatorre, raising money for her family and campaigning for her killer's indictment. A mural was unveiled in downtown Bakersfield on October 12, 2020. Cruz pleaded guilty to kidnapping, raping, and murdering Alatorre. On November 1, 2022, he was sentenced to life in prison without the possibility of parole.

== Background and murder ==
For a week before her death, Alatorre and Inglewood native Armando Cruz communicated through social media, sharing explicit photos of themselves with each other. Alatorre and Cruz then met, where Cruz convinced Alatorre to perform oral sex.

Alatorre disappeared from her home on July 1, 2020, around 11:00 p.m., entering a white pickup truck near Wible Road and Hosking Avenue which was captured on camera. Cruz drove around the area with Alatorre screaming and saying that she didn't want to go with him as he forced himself onto her, sexually assaulting her while strangling her until her death. He then had sex with the body before burning it in an industrial area in Inglewood.

== Investigation ==
The Bakersfield Police Department initially believed Alatorre ran away from home, but released more information about her disappearance, including an image of a white pickup truck near where Alatorre was last seen on July 4. The investigation turned into a homicide investigation, and on July 6, the police tracked down the pick-up truck, naming 24-year-old Armando Cruz as a person of interest. Cruz was arrested after police located a vehicle matching the white pickup truck seen on the surveillance video.

== Judicial process ==
On July 7, the Kern Country District Attorney Cynthia Zimmer filed 12 felony charges against Cruz, including aggravated sexual assault. Cruz pleaded not guilty to all 12 felony charges. On July 30, Cruz did not appear at the court hearing, with district attorney Zimmer stating that he did not want to leave his cell and wanted to talk to his lawyer before going to court. The next day, court documents described Alatorre's murder with Cruz admitting he had sex with Alatorre against her will, and later murdered her before dumping her cellphone on California State Route 99.

On August 14, 2020, Cruz's defense sought to exclude media and the public from all pretrial hearings to give a "fair trial" for Cruz and due to the COVID-19 pandemic. A month later, on September 28, 2020, the First Amendment Coalition asked the court to reject the request with executive director David Snyder stating that "absent extraordinary circumstances not present in the Cruz case, the public has the right to see how their judicial system works." On October 22, the hearings were postponed until December as the Coalition motioned for the trial to be public. In December, the trial was once again postponed to February 2021.

In the February hearing, Cruz did not appear in court while his attorney attempted to change the venue of the trial, but this was declined by the judge. On April 21, 2021, the preliminary hearing was postponed to August 12. The multiple postponements of the pre-trial hearings was criticized by locals. Cruz's hearing was pushed back to October 22, and was subsequently pushed to November 4 after presiding judge Charles R. Brehmer reprimanded the defense team for not appearing. On November 4, Cruz was arraigned on indictment where he pled not guilty, with his next hearing on December 14. On December 14, 2021, the attorneys representing Cruz withdrew from the case, with a public defender appointed to represent him.

On January 25, 2022, the hearing for Cruz was postponed to March 2022, with Cruz arraigned on a new indictment on February 24, 2022. On March 1, 2022, a hearing for Cruz was continued to June 15, 2022. On June 15, 2022, Cruz was ordered to stand trial on October 17. On October 4, Cruz pleaded guilty to the rape and murder of Alatorre, with Cruz sentenced to life imprisonment.

== Reactions ==
=== Memorials and vigils ===
On the day Cruz was apprehended, the family and community held a vigil for Alatorre near the neighborhood where she was last seen. The Greenfield Union School District issued a response to her death, offering grief counseling services at McKee. The family planned to hold a vigil every day until she was found and laid to rest. The vigil site continued to be visited by mourners, which prompted concerns for the neighborhood as people mistook the neighbor's houses as her home. A memorial service was held on July 25. On May 15, 2021, the community gathered for a vigil celebrating her 14th birthday. On May 27, the Greenfield Union School District posthumously awarded Alatorre a graduation diploma. On October 12, community members gathered for a "Day of Kindness" in honor of Alatorre, which was also aiming to educate the public about online predators.

=== Cruise for Patty ===
On July 10 and 11, residents conducted a car cruise in remembrance of Alatorre, who was a fan of cars. The next day, more than 100 people came to the event to honor Alatorre and raised money for her family.

=== Mural ===
Local artists from the group The Next Steps wanted to paint a mural for Alatorre to recognize her as "Bakersfield’s Daughter." On October 12, the group unveiled a mural between 19th and L street. The mural was installed after a ceremony, with participants bringing either a red rose or a sunflower, Alatorre's favorite flower.
