= California Correctional Center =

Former state prison in Susanville, California

California Correctional Center (CCC)
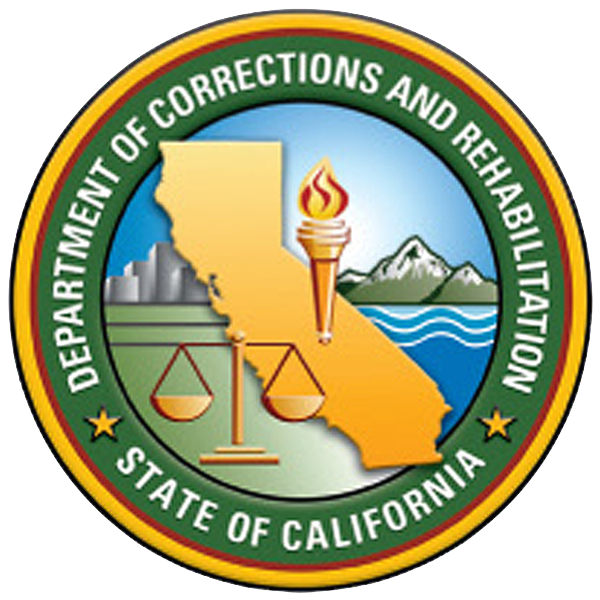
- Aerial View
- Interactive map of California Correctional Center (CCC)
- Location: Susanville, California; 40.405°N 120.512°W
- Status: Deactivated
- Security class: Minimum-medium
- Capacity: 3,883
- Population: 2,308 (59.4%) (July 31, 2022)
- Opened: 1963
- Closed: June 30, 2023
- Managed by: California Department of Corrections and Rehabilitation
- Warden: Suzanne Peery

California Correctional Center (CCC) was a state prison in the city of Susanville in Northern California. It was a minimum-security facility.

Also located in Susanville is the High Desert State Prison (California) (maximum security), and nearby the Federal Correctional Institution, Herlong. Lassen County has a concentration of prisons, which employ half of the adult population of Susanville. The state facilities prisons were severely overcrowded until 2012, when legislation was passed requiring reduction in prison populations. Many facilities are still above design capacity, increasing risk to correction officers and inmates.

== Facilities ==
CCC's missions are "to receive, house, and train minimum-custody inmates for placement into one of the institution's 18 Northern California conservation camps" and "to provide meaningful work, training, and education programs for inmates who do not meet the criteria for assignment to a conservation camp." It has 1,100 acres (450 ha) including Level l ("Open dormitories without a secure perimeter") housing, Level ll ("Open dormitories with secure perimeter fences and armed coverage") housing, Level lll ("Individual cells, fenced perimeters and armed coverage") housing, and camps. As of Fiscal Year 2006/2007, CCC had 1,184 staff and an annual budget of $139 million.

As of September 2007, it had a design capacity of 3,883 but a total institution population of 6,093, for an occupancy rate of 156.9 percent. Due to AB109, the inmate population was reduced to 2889 as of March 13, 2012.

== History ==
Location of Susanville within Lassen County, and Lassen County within California

The prison was built in 1963 as a minimum-security facility. It was expanded in 1987 to include facilities to accommodate medium-security inmates.

Among the vocational programs at CCC, the "certified 90-day horse gentling program" for wild horses, begun in 1987, has received much attention. The federal Bureau of Land Management supplies wild horses captured from the "high desert border country of northeastern California and western Nevada"; inmates "are not paid for their participation." After the program, the horses "become candidates for the periodic public horse adoptions held at the prison." The program is thought to benefit inmates; as one participant said, "it teaches you patience and teaches you that if you want something, you have to work at it."

In 2004, the anti-prison political action group Californians United for a Responsible Budget coalition (which advocates for "lowering the number of inmates and prisons") suggested that CCC and three other prisons be closed as a cost-cutting measure, but CCC continued to operate. Advocates wanting to improve prison conditions gained passage of legislation in 2012 requiring reduction in the severe overcrowding in state prisons.

In October 2007 Governor Arnold Schwarzenegger "directed inmate firefighters and staff from the California Department of Corrections and Rehabilitation," including those from CCC, to help fight the California wildfires.

On December 20, 2016, a riot erupted at the prison involving approximately 100 prisoners.

The prison was scheduled to close in June 2023. However, defenders of the California Correctional Center sued the state, which prompted a judge in rural Lassen County to issue a temporary restraining order which halted the closure.

The California Correctional Center was fully deactivated as of June 30, 2023.

A side effect of the prison closing is the impact on the local economy as the prison system in remote areas like Susanville relied on the prison for jobs. From the announcement of the closure in 2021, the population dropped from a peak of 16,000 to 14,000 in 2024. The elementary school in the area lost 10% of enrolled students from 2021 to 2025-2026 school year.

== Notable inmates ==
- Brandon Mclnerney (born 1994), murderer of Larry F. King Now located in Folsom State Prison.
- Hugo Pinell (born 1945), member of the San Quentin Six; was sentenced for assault in 1970

== In popular culture ==
The documentary film Prison Town, USA, was shown as part of the P.O.V. series on PBS television in July 2007. It explores the effects upon the residents of rural Susanville of living near the CCC, High Desert State Prison, and the nearby Federal Correctional Institution, Herlong, which was opening when the film was made. In "job-starved rural America, ... residents see them as the last and only chance for employment after work at the lumber mill or the dairy dries up."

== See also ==
- List of California state prisons
