= California State Prison, Centinela =

Male-only state prison in Imperial County, California, US

California State Prison, Centinela (CEN)
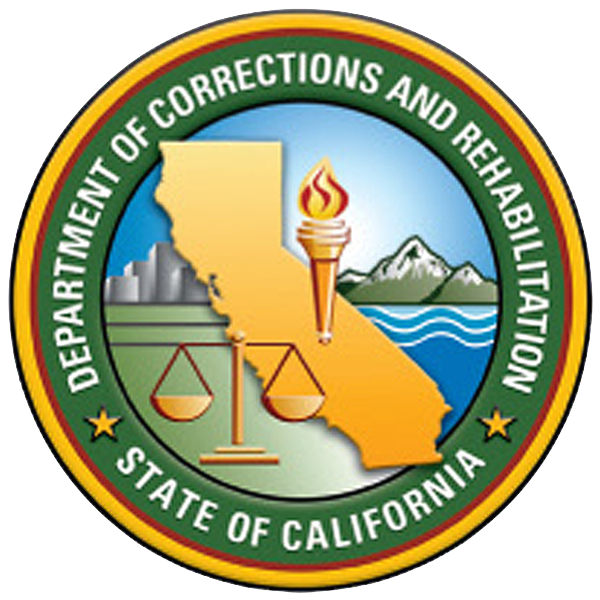
- Aerial View
- Interactive map of California State Prison, Centinela (CEN)
- Location: Imperial County, California; 32.823°N 115.789°W
- Status: Operational
- Security class: Minimum-Maximum
- Capacity: 2,308
- Population: 2,773 (120.1% capacity) (January 31, 2023)
- Opened: October 1993
- Managed by: California Department of Corrections and Rehabilitation
- Warden: Raymond Madden

California State Prison, Centinela (CEN) is a male-only state prison located in Imperial County, California, approximately 20 miles (32 km) from Imperial and El Centro. The facility is sometimes referenced Centinela State Prison.

== Facilities ==
CEN is situated on 2,000 acres (810 ha). Of its housing units, 1 Level IV GP, 2 Level III GP, 1 Level III SNY yards ("5 two tier buildings on each yard, 100 Double occupancy cells per building, razor wire cinder block/ chain link fenced perimeters and armed coverage") all surrounded by an additional electrified fence protected by two razor wire atop chain link fences and 1 Level I yard (2 buildings, open dormitory, maximum capacity of 200 inmates each, with secure chain link fence perimeter).

The facility also includes a "CTC" ("Correctional Treatment Center", treating medical, dental, and mental health issues with an integrated hospital type area/ department)."ADSEG" (administrative segregation) has a maximum occupancy of 175, and a Firehouse (Centinela Fire Department, CEP is the three letter identifier) that houses 8 Level I inmates actively trained as structural/ wildland firefighters. Centinela Fire Department is part of the institutions rehabilitation program. It provides rigorous and accelerated training meeting state fire certification, equivalent to a volunteer structural/ wildland firefighter. A library facility was established in 2016.

== Population and staffing ==
As of Fiscal Year 2007/2008, CEN had a total of 1,266 staff and an annual institutional operating budget of $161 million. As of December 2008, it had a design capacity of 2,383 but a total institution population of 5,097, for an occupancy rate of 213% percent.

As of April 30, 2020, CEN was incarcerating people at 142.3% of its design capacity, with 3,284 occupants.

== History ==
CEN was named after Cerro Centinela, the Spanish name for Mount Signal which straddles the U.S.-Mexico border. The prison opened in October 1993, approximately 22 months after Calipatria State Prison located approximately 40 miles (64 km) north.

A 1994 statute "require[d] the U.S. attorney general either to agree to compensate a state for incarcerating an illegal immigrant or to take the undocumented criminal into federal custody." In January 1996, the administration of Governor Pete Wilson "tested the law" by asking Immigration and Naturalization Service agents "to take custody of a 25-year-old illegal immigrant serving time in Centinela State Prison for drug offenses"; however, the agents refused. Therefore, in March 1996 Wilson sued the federal government to enforce the 1994 law.

As of 1997, CEN was the "most overcrowded prison in the state" as it ran at "259 percent of designed capacity." By 2007, however, Avenal State Prison was the California state prison system's "most overcrowded facility."

In August 2006, a quadriplegic inmate died after the air conditioning failed in a van carrying him and another inmate from California Substance Abuse Treatment Facility and State Prison, Corcoran to CEN. According to a reporter's summary of statements by "the federal official now in control of medical care in the state's prison system," the death was "proof of a broken system"; according to the reporter's summary of statements by representatives of the California Department of Corrections and Rehabilitation, the death was "a terrible event caused by happenstance."

== Notable prisoners ==
- Cimarron Bell (born 1974) - Serial killer. Currently at California State Prison, Corcoran
- Michael Carson- Serial killer, spent time here before being moved to another prison.
- Blake Leibel - Perpetrator of the 2018 murder of Iana Kasian
- Loi Khac Nguyen (born c. 1974) - One of several perpetrators of the 1991 Sacramento hostage crisis. Currently at Valley State Prison, Chowchilla.
- John Leonard Orr (born 1949) - Serial arsonist and mass murderer
- Sanyika Shakur (1963-2021) - Gang member; transferred elsewhere and released on parole
- Genaro Villanueva (born c. 1969) - Convicted of murdering actor David Huffman
- Damian M. Williams (born 1973) - One of several attackers of Reginald Denny in 1992; was released but reincarcerated for murder in 2000
- Earlonne Woods - Podcaster and author convicted of attempted second-degree robbery; later transferred to San Quentin State Prison and released
