= List of killings by law enforcement officers in the United States, November 2022 =

This is a list of people reported killed by non-military law enforcement officers in the United States in November 2022, whether in the line of duty or not, and regardless of reason or method. The listing documents the occurrence of a death, making no implications regarding wrongdoing or justification on the part of the person killed or officer involved. Killings are arranged by date of the incident that caused death. Different death dates, if known, are noted in the description. The table below lists 112 people.

== November 2022 ==
Date	Name (age) of deceased	Race of deceased	Location	Description
2022-11-30	Delfino Avila	Unknown	San Bernardino, California	Police shot Avila after he allegedly set a palm tree on fire and charged at officers holding a piece of wood after a stun gun was ineffective. Police did not specify what object Avila was holding.
2022-11-30	David Orlando Andrade Gomez	Unknown	Columbus, Ohio	
2022-11-30	Joshua Antelope (24)	Unknown	Mariposa County, California	
2022-11-30	Watts Williams II (25)	Unknown	Mesa, Arizona	
2022-11-29	Reymundo Ricardo Flores (33)	Latino	Floresville, Texas	
2022-11-29	Enrique Alcarez (34)	Latino	Phoenix, Arizona	
2022-11-29	Francis Englebright (46)	Native American	Locust Grove, Oklahoma	
2022-11-29	Kenneth Knotts (41)	Black	Dallas, Texas	Police took Knotts to the University of Texas Southwestern Medical Center after he told police government agents were trying to kill him and his son. At the hospital Knotts escaped his room and tried to run away. Officers with the hospital's police department tased Knotts several times, and his condition worsened and he died. His death was later ruled a homicide.
2022-11-29	Raul Cuen (48)	Latino	Susanville, California	Two correctional officers shot and killed Cuen and Nunez, both serving sentences for separate murders, after they allegedly began stabbing another inmate at the High Desert State Prison.
2022-11-29	Frank Nanez (32)	Latino	Susanville, California	Two correctional officers shot and killed Cuen and Nunez, both serving sentences for separate murders, after they allegedly began stabbing another inmate at the High Desert State Prison.
2022-11-29	Aaron Mensah (23)	Black	Frederick, Maryland	
2022-11-27	Unnamed man (36)	Unknown	Stafford County, Virginia	
2022-11-27	Robert Duncan (41)	Unknown	Cordelia, California	
2022-11-27	Gus Spanoudis (63)	White	St. Petersburg, Florida	
2022-11-27	Ricardo Almons Gary (32)	Black	Auburn, AL	
2022-11-27	Calvin L. Brown Jr (61)	Unknown race	Longview, TX	
2022-11-26	Jose Soliz (29)	Unknown	Madera, California	
2022-11-26	Jorge Martinez-Sanchez (42)	Unknown	Caldwell, Idaho	
2022-11-25	Mark Winek (69)	White	Riverside, California	Austin Lee Edwards, a former Virginia State Trooper and current law enforcement officer in Washington County, Virginia, drove across the country to meet a teenage girl he catfished online, before killing her mother and grandparents and kidnapping the girl. When police found his vehicle in San Bernardino County a shootout occurred, and Edwards shot himself.
2022-11-25	Sharie Winek (65)	White	Riverside, California	Austin Lee Edwards, a former Virginia State Trooper and current law enforcement officer in Washington County, Virginia, drove across the country to meet a teenage girl he catfished online, before killing her mother and grandparents and kidnapping the girl. When police found his vehicle in San Bernardino County a shootout occurred, and Edwards shot himself.
2022-11-25	Brooke Winek (38)	White	Riverside, California	Austin Lee Edwards, a former Virginia State Trooper and current law enforcement officer in Washington County, Virginia, drove across the country to meet a teenage girl he catfished online, before killing her mother and grandparents and kidnapping the girl. When police found his vehicle in San Bernardino County a shootout occurred, and Edwards shot himself.
2022-11-25	Austin D. Wellott (30)	White	McKinney, Texas	
2022-11-25	Jose Torres (46)	Latino	Corpus Christi, Texas	
2022-11-25	Angela Nuckols (58)	White	Round Rock, Texas	
2022-11-25	Ross Milton Floersheim (41)	White	Fountain, Colorado	
2022-11-25	Blaine Denetdele (30)	Native American	Albuquerque, New Mexico	
2022-11-24	Sunshine Foy (42)	White	Hubert, North Carolina	
2022-11-24	Shane Michael Boston (41)	White	Litchfield, IL	
2022-11-24	Unnamed man (30)	Unknown	Buffalo, Oklahoma	
2022-11-23	Jesse Hall (26)	White	Putnam County, West Virginia	
2022-11-23	Cody Smestad (30)	White	Chandler, Arizona	
2022-11-22	Kevin Dizmang (63)	White	Colorado Springs, Colorado	A mental health team was called after Dizmang was reported walking into traffic. Police and a paramedic handcuffed Dizmang and restrained him. He stopped moving and fell unconscious. An autopsy found Dizmang died from cardiac arrest due to physical restraint with methamphetamine use, asthma, and obesity as contributing factors. His death was ruled a homicide.
2022-11-22	Travis Fields (39)	White	Washington County, Virginia	
2022-11-22	Tyree O'Neal (29)	Black	Jacksonville, Florida	
2022-11-21	Lerelle Chatman (23)	Black	Redan, Georgia	
2022-11-21	Eric Holmes (19)	Black	Morrow, Georgia	An officer was investigating a stolen vehicle found in a parking lot when Holmes approached him and began a conversation, giving no indication of any connection to the vehicle. While speaking to the officer, Holmes walked away and entered the vehicle before starting the engine. As Holmes drove away, the officer shot him in the back, and Holmes crashed nearby. Two guns were found inside the vehicle, although the Georgia Bureau of Investigation did not state who they belonged to. The officer resigned before he could be terminated.
2022-11-21	Justin Anderson (51)	White	Loveland, Colorado	
2022-11-20	Alma Worthington (38)	White	Herriman, Utah	
2022-11-20	Ruben Dorado (31)	Hispanic	Port Allen, Louisiana	
2022-11-20	Billy Denton (36)	White	Dallas, Georgia	
2022-11-20	Martin Bradley (65)	White	Round Rock, Texas	
2022-11-19	Taylor Shomaker (32)	White	O'Fallon, Missouri	
2022-11-19	Immanuel Clark-Johnson (30)	Black	Portland, Oregon	Police approached Clark-Johnson's vehicle in connection with an armed robbery, though Clark-Johnson was not one of the people involved. As Clark-Johnson ran away an officer shot him with an AR-15 rifle when he reached into his pocket, later saying he believed Clark-Johnson was reaching for a gun.
2022-11-19	Miguel Romero (47)	Hispanic	Uniondale, NY	
2022-11-19	Daniel Kachinoski (48)	White	Niagara, New York	
2022-11-19	Lucas Christenson (46)	White	Shawano, Wisconsin	
2022-11-18	Neil Alexander Costin (32)	White	Lacey, Washington	Costin allegedly carjacked a semi truck and crashed it. After a standoff, police say he came towards them with a box cutter. They shot and killed him.
2022-11-18	Manuel Medina (24)	Black	New York City, New York	
2022-11-18	James Murphy (58)	White	Rapid City, South Dakota	
2022-11-17	Unknown	Unknown	Cabo Rojo, Puerto Rico	A suspected drug smuggler on a ship was killed during a shootout with Customs and Border Protection (CBP) agents off the coast of Puerto Rico. A CBP agent was also killed in the shootout.
2022-11-17	Roberto Armijo (34)	Latino	Albuquerque, New Mexico	
2022-11-17	Tristan Melton (26)	White	Uniontown, Alabama	
2022-11-17	Nicholas Mitchell (42)	White	Chillicothe, Ohio	
2022-11-16	Thomas Phan (40)	Asian	Santa Ana, California	
2022-11-16	Alejandro Montes (41)	Hispanic	Santa Ana, CA	
2022-11-16	Joe Williams (31)	Black	Fort Worth, Texas	
2022-11-16	John Wells (49)	White	Chattanooga, Tennessee	
2022-11-16	Unnamed person	Unknown	Albuquerque, New Mexico	
2022-11-15	Abran Gutierrez (36)	Latino	Redwood City, California	
2022-11-15	Rajan Moonesinghe (33)	South Asian	Austin, Texas	Police were called by a neighbor who reported Moonesinghe pointed a rifle into his home and fired. Relatives stated Moonesinghe believed there was a burglar in his home. When police arrived, an officer ordered Moonesinghe to drop his weapon, then immediately fired.
2022-11-15	Jesse Minton (29)	White	Miramar Beach, Florida	
2022-11-15	Timothy "Sammy" Johnson (38)	White	Oklahoma City, Oklahoma	
2022-11-14	Matthew Teears (31)	White	Spokane County, Washington	Deputies shot and killed Teears after a lengthy standoff. The Spokane County Sheriff's Office say several Deputies were involved in the shooting. Three deputies shot a man who was running away while wearing a gas mask and allegedly holding a handgun. Police claim the man started a fire inside a home he was barricaded in, and also fired several shots inside the home.
2022-11-14	Angely Solis (27)	Hispanic	Rochester, New York	An off-duty Greece Police Officer shot two women, killing Solis and wounding the other, before killing herself.
2022-11-14	Phymor Tenry (21)	Asian	Tenino, Washington	Officials said two men, who were wanted in Oregon, were spotted in a stolen car in Lewis County, Washington. Law enforcement officers attempted to stop the vehicle which resulted police pursuit. After the pursuit concluded, one man from the stolen vehicle allegedly fired shots at deputies. Deputies returned fire and shot and killed Tenry.
2022-11-14	Jerrionte Gibson (22)	Black	West Palm Beach, Florida	
2022-11-13	Marcus Allen (38)	Black	Forest Hills, Pennsylvania	
2022-11-13	Unnamed man (24)	Unknown	Federal Way, Washington	
2022-11-12	Gary Schryver (61)	White	Spring Hill, Florida	
2022-11-12	Kenneth Scott Wallis (38)	White	Cabazon, California	
2022-11-12	Adam Romero (26)	Latino	Goodyear, Arizona	
2022-11-12	Senquarius Williams (26)	Black	Madison, Tennessee	
2022-11-12	Drandon Brown (64)	White	Nashville, Tennessee	
2022-11-11	Prince Jones (24)	Black	Toledo, Ohio	
2022-11-11	Name Withheld	Unknown race	San Antonio, TX	
2022-11-11	Payton Masterson (22)	White	Tell City, Indiana	
2022-11-10	Jermaine Hickson (42)	Black	Brooklyn, New York	Hickson was shot and killed by Brooklyn police officers after he fired at them following a domestic dispute report. The bodycam footage was released and all the officers were cleared.One of the officer involved, Colin Rossiter, shot and killed himself a few months after this incident due to phycological impact.
2022-11-10	Ki'Azia Miller (27)	Black	Detroit, Michigan	Miller's mother called police to report that her daughter, who had schizophrenia, was having a mental health crisis and had hit her child. Police surrounded Miller's home and two officers entered. One officer shot Miller, saying she reached for his gun. The two officers who entered Miller's home were suspended without pay.
2022-11-10	Reginald Bethea (62)	Latino	Pueblo, Colorado	
2022-11-10	Jesus Crosby (41)	Latino	Albuquerque, New Mexico	
2022-11-09	Hugo Corral-Velasco (32)	Latino	Kansas City, Kansas	
2022-11-09	William Fairweather (39)	White	Catoosa, Oklahoma	
2022-11-08	Benjamin Weise (33)	White	Greeley, Colorado	
2022-11-08	Jorge Lopez (17)	Latino	Jacksonville, North Carolina	
2022-11-08	Ethan Huiras (20)	White	Lafayette, Colorado	
2022-11-07	Kenneth Collins (44)	White	Johnson City, Tennessee	
2022-11-06	Tyree Moorehead (46)	Black	Baltimore, Maryland	Police responded to reports of a man assaulting a woman with a knife. Police say they saw Moorehead lying on top of a woman while holding a knife, and an officer shot him. Moorehead was an activist known for spray-painting “No Shoot Zones” at shooting scenes.
2022-11-06	Kenneth Vineyard (48)	White	Monaca, Pennsylvania	After a man was shot and wounded in the parking lot of a Walmart, Vineyard went to the man's side to deliver aid. When paramedics arrived, a man in plainclothes told Vineyard to step away from the victim, then shoved him backwards, causing his head to hit the pavement. Vineyard was found with no pulse and sent to a hospital, where he died. According to an attorney hired by Vineyard's family and Pennsylvania State Police, the man who shoved Vineyard is an off-duty Center Township Police officer.
2022-11-06	Derrick Kittling (45)	Black	Alexandria, Louisiana	A deputy pulled Kittling over for a window tint and modified exhaust. After ordering Kittling to stand outside his vehicle, the deputy grabbed Kittling's arm, before pulling out his taser. Following a struggle over the taser, in which it was fired twice, the deputy shot Kittling.
2022-11-06	Pascal Perez Brossard (37)	Black	Missouri City, Texas	
2022-11-05	Javon Jones (37)	Black	Jacksonville, Florida	
2022-11-05	Brian Taylor (54)	White	Jordan Township, Pennsylvania	
2022-11-05	Julian Sanchez (21)	Latino	Albuquerque, New Mexico	
2022-11-05	John File (28)	White	Dripping Springs, Texas	
2022-11-04	Tye Sutherland (30)	White	Lawrenceburg, Kentucky	
2022-11-04	Kelvontae Zikel Banks (24)	Black	Riverdale, Georgia	An officer responding to a call without his emergency equipment activated crashed into Bank's car as he was driving to pick up his child's mother.
2022-11-04	Rodney Finch (63)	White	Las Vegas, Nevada	
2022-11-04	Jose Cabrera Hernandez (49)	Latino	Las Vegas, Nevada	
2022-11-04	Marando Salmon (36)	Black	Stone Mountain, Georgia	
2022-11-04	Timothy Hodges (32)	White	Winnsboro, Texas	
2022-11-04	Sergio Gomez (52)	Latino	Gwinnett County, Georgia	
2022-11-03	Ramiro Lozano (46)	Latino	Compton, California	
2022-11-03	Tyler Nastazio (26)	White	Tehachapi, California	
2022-11-03	Kyle Styles Loverna Lockett (21)	Black	New York City, New York	
2022-11-03	Krysten Pretlor (35)	Black	Derry Township, Pennsylvania	
2022-11-02	Leontae Kirk (29)	Black	Phoenix, Arizona	
2022-11-02	Wyatt Maxwell Beckler (18)	White	Fort Wayne, Indiana	Fort Wayne officers responded to an armed disturbance call. When the officers arrived on scene, they found a man who matched the caller's description. He was later identified as Wyatt Beckler. Beckler did not comply with the officer's verbal commands, and then brandished a weapon. This prompted officer Andrew Fry to shoot Beckler. Beckler was taken to Lutheran Hospital where he later died.
2022-11-02	Matthew Orlando Dilworth (50)	Black	Jacksonville, Florida	
2022-11-02	Eric Allen (39)	Black	Mount Juliet, Tennessee	
2022-11-01	Raymundo Duran III (30)	White	Fort Worth, Texas	
2022-11-01	Eugene Elliot Reed (69)	White	Sherwood, AR	
2022-11-01	Jerry Terry (62)	Black	Springfield, TN	

== See also ==
- Death in custody § United States
- Henry A. Wallace Police Crime Public Database
- List of cases of police brutality
- List of countries with annual rates and counts for killings by law enforcement officers
- List of law enforcement officers killed in the line of duty in the United States
- List of law enforcement officers convicted for an on-duty killing in the United States
- List of shootings by US immigration agents
- List of police reforms related to the George Floyd protests
- List of unarmed African Americans killed by law enforcement officers in the United States
- Lists of killings by law enforcement officers
- Police brutality in the United States
- Police misconduct § United States
- Police riot § United States
- Police use of deadly force in the United States
