= Borden, California =

Unincorporated community in California, United States

Borden
- Unincorporated community
- Location in California Borden (the United States)
- Coordinates: 36°55′48″N 120°01′36″W
- Country: United States
- State: California
- County: Madera
- Elevation: 272 ft (83 m)

Borden (formerly Alabama Settlement and Arcola) is an unincorporated community in Madera County, California, United States. It is located on the Southern Pacific Railroad, 3 miles (4.8 km) southeast of Madera, at an elevation of 272 feet (83 m).

The first settlers came from Alabama in 1858, whence its original name. The name Arcola comes from the plantation in Alabama owned by one of the settlers. The current name was bestowed by the railroad for civic leader, Dr. Joseph Borden. The Borden post office operated to 1873, closed for a time in 1896, and closed permanently in 1907.

On December 2, 2010, the California High-Speed Rail Authority Board voted to start construction of the first part of the California High-Speed Rail line at Borden and continue it to Corcoran. Construction was expected to begin in 2012. As of 2024, the project had yet to make any significant progress.
