= California State Prison, Los Angeles County =

State prison in Lancaster, California

California State Prison, Los Angeles County (LAC)
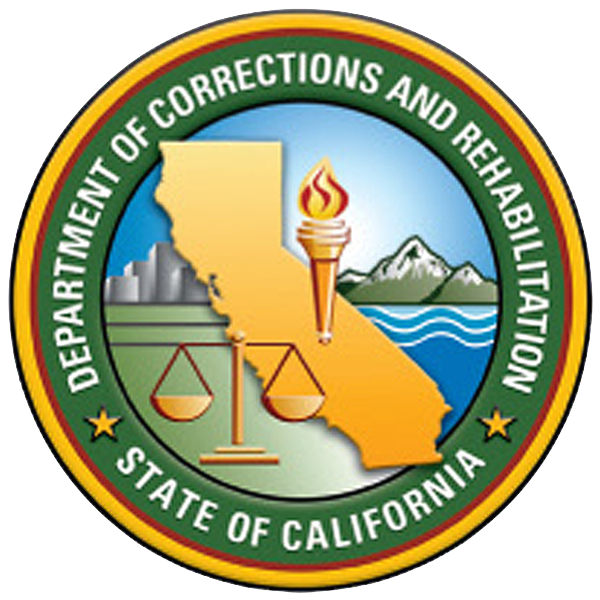
- Interactive map of California State Prison, Los Angeles County (LAC)
- Location: Lancaster, California; 34.694°N 118.228°W
- Status: Operational
- Security class: Minimum–maximum
- Capacity: 2,300
- Population: 2,503 (108.8% capacity) (January 31, 2023)
- Opened: February 1993
- Managed by: California Department of Corrections and Rehabilitation
- Warden: Raybon C. Johnson Jr.

California State Prison, Los Angeles County (LAC) is a male-only state prison located in the city of Lancaster, in Los Angeles County, California. The only state prison located in the county, it is also referenced as Los Angeles County State Prison, CSP-Los Angeles County, and CSP-LAC. Only occasionally is the prison referred to as Lancaster State Prison, which was particularly avoided in 1992 partly to ease the stigma for Lancaster.

== Facilities ==
As of Fiscal Year 2006/2007, LAC had a total of 1,519 staff and an annual operating budget of $100 million. As of September 2007, it had a design capacity of 2,300 but a total institution population of 4,976, for an occupancy rate of 216.3 percent.

As of April 30, 2020, LAC was incarcerating people at 137.3% of its design capacity, with 3,158 occupants.

LAC's 262 acres (106 ha) include the following facilities:

- Level I housing: Open dormitories without a secure perimeter
- Level IV housing: Cells, fenced or walled perimeters, electronic security, more staff and armed officers both inside and outside the installation
- Reception Center (RC): provides short term housing to process, classify and evaluate incoming inmates

== History ==
Before the prison opened in 1993, Los Angeles County hosted no prisons but accounted for forty percent of California's state-prison inmates. "Most of Lancaster's civic leaders and residents" opposed the building of the prison, and four inmates escaped from LAC in its first year of operation. Nevertheless, by 2000 city residents' opinions of the prison had improved so much that a proposal to increase the proportion of maximum-security inmates received little criticism.

A 2006–2007 conversion "of roughly half of" LAC's facilities decreased the number of maximum-security inmates and increased the number of reception center inmates. Since reception center inmates are at the prison for shorter times than maximum-security inmates, the conversion may "reduce the number of families that will relocate to the region to be near a family member who is in the prison" and "reduce the number of prisoners who will want to relocate to the area after serving their sentences or after being released on parole".

In March 2021, Canadian singer Justin Bieber visited the prison with his wife Hailey and pastor Judah Smith at the invitation of Scott Budnick. Justin Bieber spoke to inmates about their faith and listened to their stories. In a statement on April 1, 2021, Bieber recounted his visit, saying "It was such an honor listening to their stories and seeing how strong their faith is."

== Notable inmates ==
=== Current ===
Inmate Name	Register Number	Status	Details	
Kori Ali Muhammad	BM7920	Serving a life sentence.	Perpetrator of the racially motivated 2017 Fresno shootings which began with the murder of security guard Carl Williams. Days later, he murdered a further three people, with Zachary Randalls, Mark Gassett, and David Jackson being killed by Kori.	
Joshua Graham Packer	AV8165	Serving three life sentences without parole.	Jeffrey Malcom Ferguson	Convicted of murdering Brock Husted, and his pregnant wife, Davina.

- Joe Son: Actor and former mixed martial artist.
- Ali Abulaban, TikToker and convicted murderer
- Chester Turner- Serial killer sentenced to death for sexually assaulting and murdering 14 women and an unborn baby. Transferred to CSP-LAC due to the abolishment of death row.

=== Former ===
- Scott Erskine: Serial killer sentenced to death in 2003 for the 1993 murders of two California boys. Spent time in CSP-LAC in the early 2000s. Died in 2020 while on death row due to COVID-19.
- Loi Khac Nguyen: One of the perpetrators of the 1991 Sacramento hostage crisis for which he was convicted of killing three people. Currently at California State Prison, Solano.
- Big Lurch: Rapper and convicted murderer.
- Robert John Bardo: Murdered actress Rebecca Schaeffer in 1989. Currently at Avenal State Prison.
- Lawrence Phillips: Former professional football player.
- Rene Enriquez: Mobster.
- Robert Rozier: Former American football defensive end. Currently at Mule Creek State Prison.
- Craig Coley: Wrongfully convicted of the 1978 murder of his ex girlfriend and her son before being pardoned and exonerated by CA governor Jerry Brown in 2017.
- Samuel Little: Serial killer convicted of killing eight women, though he is suspected of killing as many as 90 in total.

== See also ==
- List of California state prisons
