= High Desert State Prison (California) =

State prison in Leavitt, California

High Desert State Prison (HDSP)
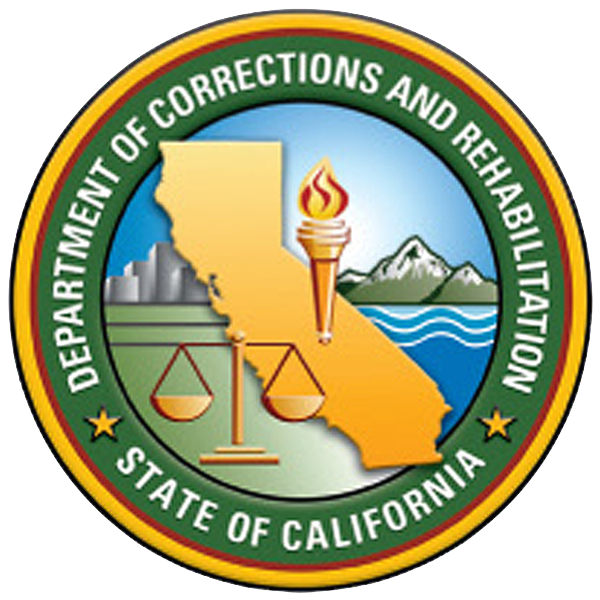
- Aerial View
- Interactive map of High Desert State Prison (HDSP)
- Location: Susanville, California; 40.4084°N 120.5139°W
- Status: Operational
- Security class: Maximum-Supermax
- Capacity: 2,324
- Population: 2,083 (89.6% capacity) (January 31, 2023)
- Opened: August 1995
- Managed by: California Department of Corrections and Rehabilitation
- Warden: Fred Foulk

High Desert State Prison (HDSP) is a high-security state prison that houses level IV inmates located in Leavitt in Lassen County, California. Opened in 1995, it has a capacity of 2,324 persons.

As of January 31, 2023, High Desert was incarcerating people at 101.6% of its design capacity, with 2,362 occupants.

A second prison facility, the Federal Correctional Institution, Herlong, is also located within Lassen County, California. The prisons and their effects on the community, including as a source of much needed jobs, were explored in the documentary Prison Town, USA (2007), aired on PBS.

== Investigation ==
Location of Susanville within Lassen County, and Lassen County within California

In December 2015, after the allegations regarding misconduct by officers and abuse of prisoners came to light, the State Office of the Inspector General carried out a six-month inquiry on the situation at the prison and published its findings. Although there are buildings to house certain inmates in protective custody, such as sex offenders, officers put other prisoners near them. The prison has had a rapid turnover in top management for nearly a decade, with seven wardens in eight years. In their report investigators wrote there was a "perception of insularity and indifference to inmates" at High Desert, exacerbated by its remoteness and "a labor organization that opposes oversight to the point of actively discouraging members from coming forward with information that could … adversely affect another officer."

== Notable inmates ==
- Terry Peder Rasmussen, serial killer, died in the prison in 2010
- David Alan Westerfield, murderer of 7-year-old Danielle van Dam
- Joseph Fiorella, one of the murderers of Elyse Pahler
