= Sierra Conservation Center =

State prison in Tuolumne County, California

Sierra Conservation Center (SCC)
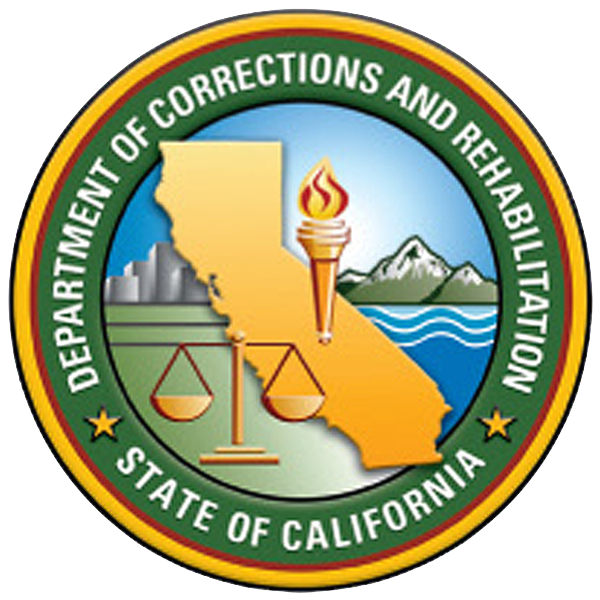
- Aerial View
- Interactive map of Sierra Conservation Center (SCC)
- Location: Tuolumne County, near Jamestown, California (also near Copperopolis); 37.8906°N 120.5378°W
- Status: Operational
- Capacity: 3,404
- Population: 4,461 (131.1%) (January 31, 2023)
- Opened: 1965
- Managed by: California Department of Corrections and Rehabilitation
- Warden: Hunter Anglea

Sierra Conservation Center (SCC) is an American 420-acre (170 ha) state prison located in Tuolumne County, California, near the unincorporated community of Jamestown. Programs offered to prisoners include education, firefighting training, and sewing.

Location of Jamestown in Tuolumne County, and Tuolumne County in California

As of July 31, 2022, SCC was incarcerating people at 65.9% of its design capacity, with 2,528 occupants.
