= Tim DeChristopher =

American environmentalist (born 1981)

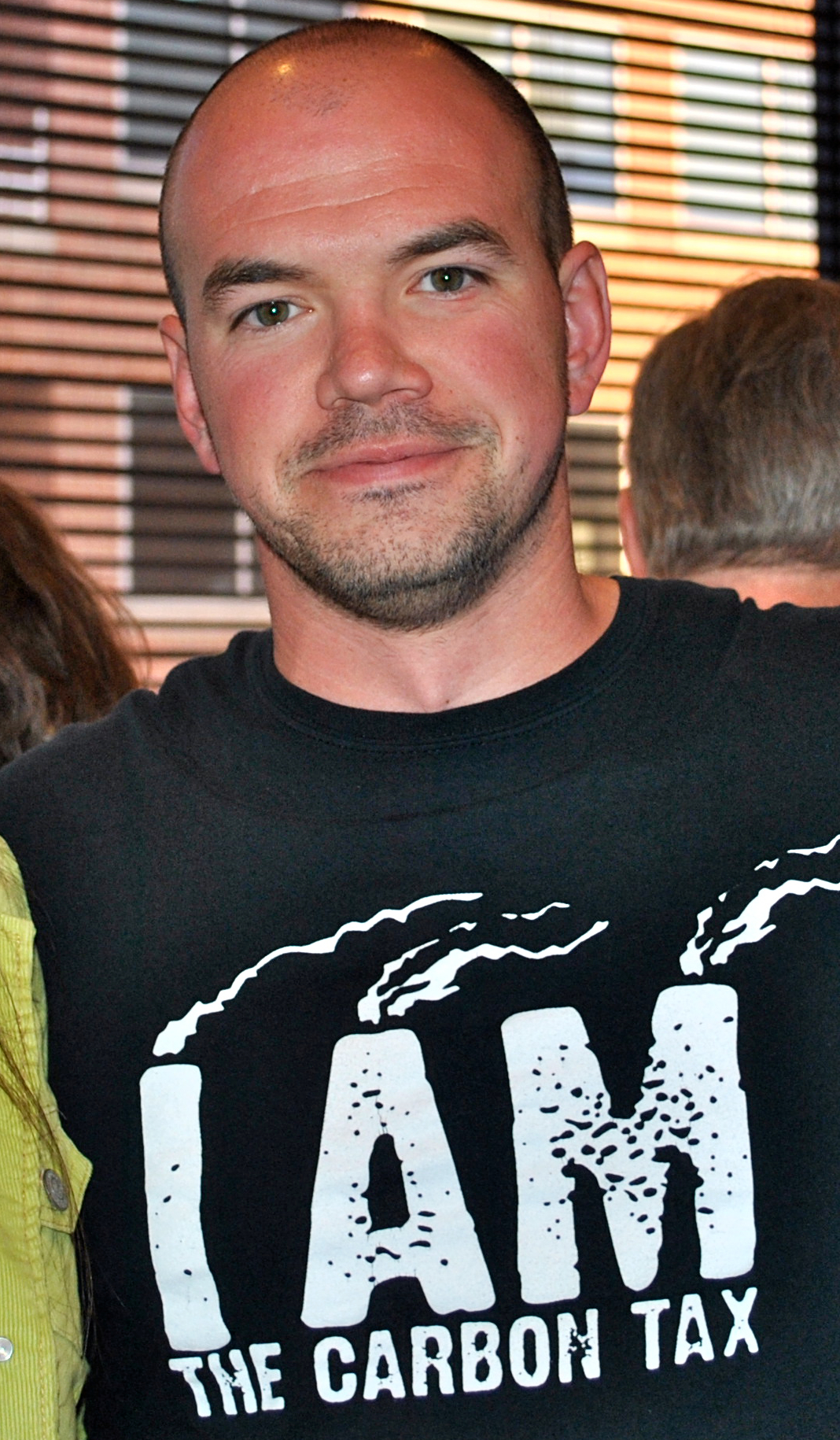
- Tim DeChristopher in 2011
- Born: Timothy Mansfield DeChristopher; November 18, 1981 (age 44); West Milford, West Virginia, United States
- Education: University of Utah
- Known for: Climate change activism
- Website: timdechristopher.org

Timothy Mansfield DeChristopher (born November 18, 1981) is an American climate activist and co-founder of the environmental group Peaceful Uprising. In December 2008, he protested a Bureau of Land Management (BLM) oil and gas lease auction of 116 parcels of public land in Utah's redrock country by successfully bidding on 14 parcels of land (totaling 22,500 acres) for $1.8 million with no intent to pay for them. DeChristopher was removed from the auction by federal agents and taken into custody, eventually serving 21 months in prison.

Saying they had been rushed into auction with insufficient environmental and scientific review, the United States Department of the Interior canceled many of the leases shortly after the auction and a subsequent court injunction.

== Early life ==
DeChristopher was born on November 18, 1981, in West Milford, West Virginia and grew up in Pittsburgh. After graduating from Shady Side Academy, he attended Arizona State University, and moved to Utah in 2005 where he worked as a wilderness guide for troubled and at-risk youth. As a guide, DeChristopher emphasized self-reliance skills and respect for the natural world. His interaction with at-risk youth groups led him to reject what he viewed as a political and economic system that concentrates wealth in the hands of a privileged few while ostracizing vulnerable and impoverished citizens in the U.S. This conviction later inspired him to study economics at the University of Utah, where he received a bachelor's degree in 2009.

== Activism ==
As an avid reader, DeChristopher developed an interest in the writers and philosophies that have shaped U.S. and global social movements. His perspective on the American environmental movement highlights the critical role that civil disobedience has played in social movements throughout history, including the civil rights and women's suffrage movements. DeChristopher's acts of civil disobedience have been compared to those of Rosa Parks by the media, but DeChristopher has said that his actions are more comparable to those of Alice Paul, who escalated the women's rights movement by forcing the government to publicly arrest women protesting on the steps of the capitol and lending visibility to an obscured social movement.

DeChristopher's actions garnered national attention for later government auctions of public land leases in the final days of the Bush administration. In January 2009, Judge Ricardo Urbina of the District of Columbia federal district court temporarily halted the sale of 77 parcels, citing BLM violations of environmental laws protecting air quality and historic preservation. In February 2009, Interior Secretary Ken Salazar shelved 77 disputed lease parcels – including some on which DeChristopher had bid in 2008 — and criticized Bush administrators for conducting a "rush review" of the contested lands.

DeChristopher has expressed the need for similar tactics to end mountaintop removal mining in his home state of West Virginia. In 2013, he and numerous other celebrities appeared in a video showing support for Chelsea Manning, and DeChristopher spoke in the University of Vermont's Ira Allen Chapel. In a 2014 climate change protest on Wall Street, DeChristopher expressed his view that "[b]eing serious about tackling the climate crisis means we have to be willing to confront corporate capitalism and the system that is driving that crisis."

After his release from jail in 2013, DeChristopher attended Harvard Divinity School and obtained a graduate degree. He settled with his family in Rhode Island. DeChristopher is a founder of the Climate Disobedience Center which provides advice and assistance to climate activists engaged in civil disobedience. He participated in the No Coal, No Gas direct action campaign to hasten the end of fossil fuel usage in New England. DeChristopher advocates for non-violent direct action to address environmental issues.

== Trial ==
In a 2009 indictment DeChristopher was charged with two felonies: violations of the Federal Onshore Oil and Gas Leasing Reform Act and making false statements. He faced a maximum sentence of 10 years in prison and $750,000 in fines.

DeChristopher's defense team sought to rely on a necessity defense, which required proof that DeChristopher was forced to choose between two evils and that his actions resulted in the lesser of the two to avoid imminent harm where no legal alternative was available. U.S. District Judge Dee Benson prohibited the defense, precluding any evidence that might have supported it. The court also barred evidence that the lease auction was deemed unlawful, that DeChristopher had raised sufficient funds for an initial payment to the BLM (which the BLM refused to accept), or that DeChristopher's motives were grounded in moral convictions related to climate change.

Prosecutor John W. Huber told the media that DeChristopher was looking for "a prominent venue for his global-warming show — a platform from which he could educate the masses," and asserted that DeChristopher had overlooked legal methods of protest. DeChristopher responded in court to the assertion that he could have filed written protests against certain parcels:

[T]wo months prior to this auction, . . . a congressional report . . . by the House committee on public lands[] stated that it had become common practice for the BLM to take volunteers from the oil and gas industry to process those permits. The oil industry was paying people specifically to volunteer for the industry that was supposed to be regulating it, and it was to those industry staff that I would have been appealing.

DeChristopher also tried to rely on a selective prosecution defense, citing "political machinations" behind the indictment and requesting information from federal prosecutors on instances in which individuals or companies reneged on bids for public land but were not prosecuted. Judge Benson denied that request as well.

DeChristopher was convicted on both felony counts.

=== Sentencing ===
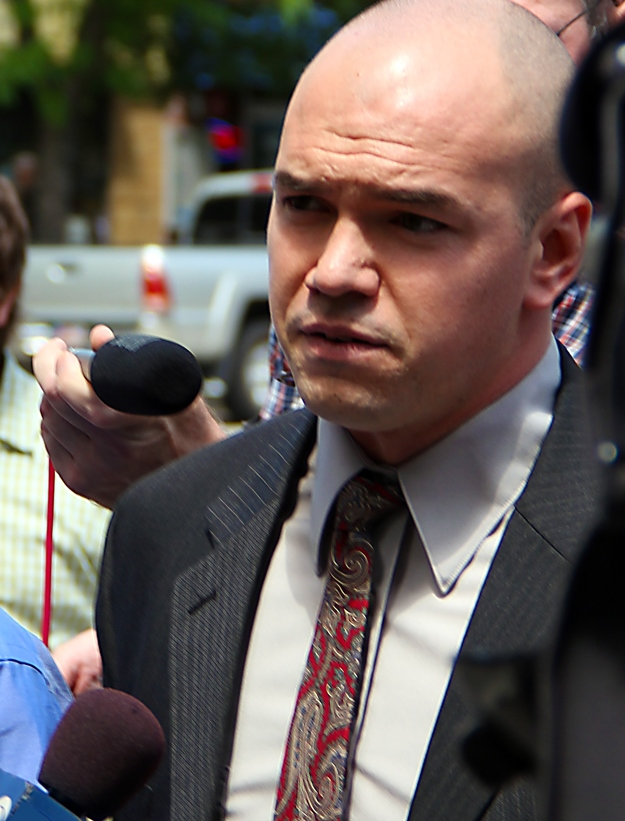
DeChristopher entering Frank E. Moss United States Courthouse, July 26, 2011

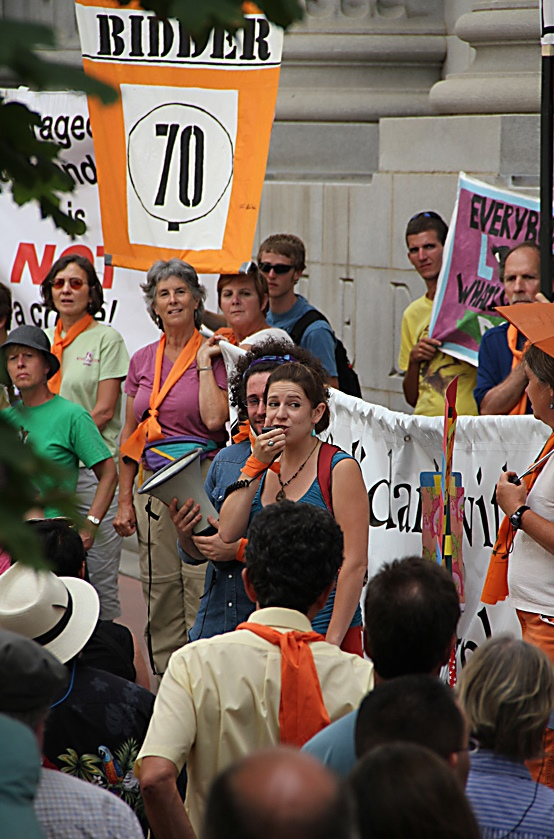
Protesters from Peaceful Uprising at Tim DeChristopher's sentencing, July 26, 2011

In his pre-sentencing statement, DeChristopher said:

[The prosecutor] wrote that 'The rule of law is the bedrock of our civilized society, not acts of "civil disobedience" committed in the name of the cause of the day'. That's an especially ironic statement when he is representing the United States of America, a place where the rule of law was created through acts of civil disobedience. Since those bedrock acts of civil disobedience by our founding fathers, the rule of law in this country has continued to grow closer to our shared higher moral code through the civil disobedience that drew attention to legalized injustice.

The U.S. Attorney's office had also argued that "a federal prison term here will deter others from entering a path of criminal behavior." DeChristopher responded:

The certainty of this statement not only ignores the history of political prisoners, it ignores the severity of the present situation. Those who are inspired to follow my actions are those who understand that we are on a path toward catastrophic consequences of climate change. They know their future, and the future of their loved ones, is on the line. And they know we are running out of time to turn things around. The closer we get to that point where it's too late, the less people have to lose by fighting back. The power of the Justice Department is based on its ability to take things away from people. The more that people feel that they have nothing to lose, the more that power begins to shrivel. The people who are committed to fighting for a livable future will not be discouraged or intimidated by anything that happens here today. And neither will I. I will continue to confront the system that threatens our future. Given the destruction of our democratic institutions that once gave citizens access to power, my future will likely involve civil disobedience. Nothing that happens here today will change that. I don't mean that in any sort of disrespectful way at all, but you don't have that authority. You have authority over my life, but not my principles. Those are mine alone.

Judge Benson imposed a sentence of two years in prison and a $10,000 fine, saying that were it not for his "continuing trail of statements" post-auction, DeChristopher might have avoided prosecution and prison. According to the judge, "The offense itself, with all apologies to people actually in the auction itself, wasn't that bad."

The sentencing was followed by protests in Salt Lake City, where 26 people were arrested, and other U.S. cities.

=== Incarceration ===
DeChristopher was initially held at Federal Correctional Institution, Herlong and was later transferred to Federal Correctional Institution, Englewood.

According to a Peaceful Uprising press release, in March 2012 DeChristopher was moved from a minimum security camp to a restrictive "special housing unit" because an email he sent to a friend contained the word "threaten," triggering an alert from the inmate correspondence monitoring system. DeChristopher was released on April 21, 2013, a day before Earth Day, after 21 months in prison.

=== Appeal ===
DeChristopher appealed to the United States Court of Appeals for the Tenth Circuit, which affirmed the convictions.

== In popular culture ==
Edward Sharpe and the Magnetic Zeros singer Alex Ebert recorded a music video "Let's Win" showcasing popular support for DeChristopher and scenes from a Salt Lake City protest in March 2011.

Author Chris Guillebeau's book, The Art of Non-Conformity, supports DeChristopher's actions as "creative acts of protest" in times when "morality and law are on opposite sides."

Rolling Stone magazine journalist Jeff Goodell wrote an article on DeChristopher calling him "America's Most Creative Climate Criminal."

American author and environmentalist Terry Tempest Williams published an op-ed piece in The Salt Lake Tribune following DeChristopher's sentence.

DeChristopher was named an Utne Reader visionary in 2011.

TreeHugger named DeChristopher 2011 Person of the Year on December 16, 2011.

A December 17, 2011 article in The Salt Lake Tribune named DeChristopher as one of 16 candidates selected by their Editorial Board to be named 2011 Utahn of the Year.

Bidder 70, a documentary film about DeChristopher directed by Beth Gage and George Gage, was released in 2012.

A "Special Treat" Q&A session was held following the 7:10pm May 17, 2013 "Theatrical Opening" of Bidder 70 at Quad Cinema in NYC. DeChristopher spoke on topics relevant to activist causes, his prison experience, and why he planned to attend Harvard Divinity School in the Fall. DeChristopher notably described himself as an "anti-government activist". Notable among the questioners was Gasland director Josh Fox. A complete video of the session was published on YouTube on May 20, 2013.

DeChristopher was interviewed on television by David Letterman on the Late Show on June 25, 2013.

DeChristopher visited Wendell Berry at his home in Kentucky in summer 2019. Their conversation appeared in Orion Magazine in March 2020 entitled "To Live and Love with a Dying World."
