= Kings Lake Shore Railroad =

Overview
- Headquarters: Hanford, California
- Locale: Corcoran, Kings County, California
- Dates of operation: 1910–1934

Technical
- Track gauge: 4 ft 8 1/2 in (1,435 mm) standard gauge

The Kings Lake Shore Railroad was a 19.4-mile (31.2 km) common carrier railroad that operated in Kings County, California from 1910 to 1934. The line primarily hauled agricultural products that grew in this region of the San Joaquin Valley. The line originated with a connection with the Atchison, Topeka and Santa Fe Railway at Corcoran and then ran south-southwest to its terminus at Liberty Farms.

Grading for the railroad commenced in 1910 as the Kings River Railroad. The Kings River Railroad was organized to build from the Santa Fe at Corcoran to Tulare Lake. The Kings River constructed 10.05 miles (16.2 km) of track.

In May 1917, the Kings Lake Shore Railroad was incorporated and took over the Kings River Railroad. The railroad extended the line another 9.4 miles (15.1 km). In 1923, the railroad acquired Santa Fe Railway's #27, a 4-4-0 American-type Schenectady Locomotive Works (Builder No. 2373) steam locomotive. Abandonment of the line was authorized during the Great Depression on January 22, 1934, and the tracks were removed the same year.

== Route ==
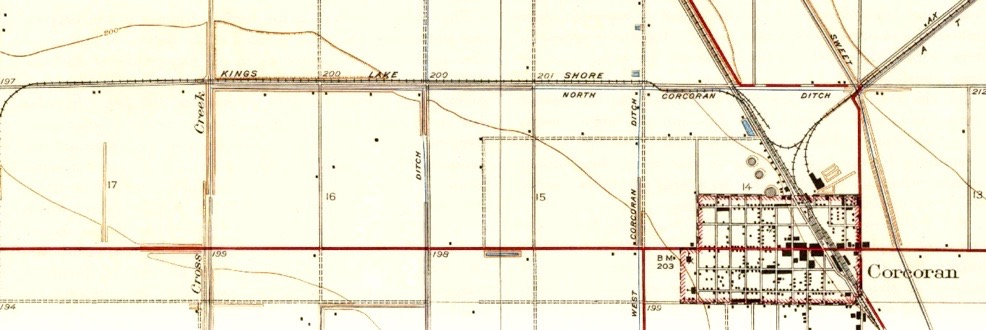
Northern terminus at Corcoran in 1928

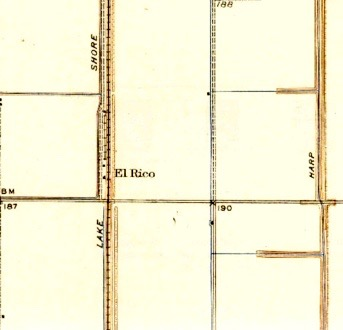
El Rico siding in 1928

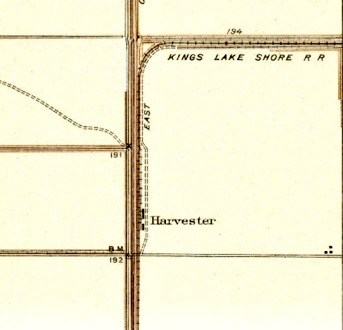
Harvester siding in 1935

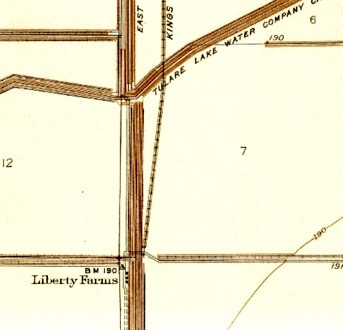
Southern terminus at Liberty Farms in 1935

- Corcoran
- El Rico
- Harvester
- Liberty Fields
