= List of California state prisons =

This is a list of state prisons in California operated by the California Department of Corrections and Rehabilitation (CDCR). CDCR owns and operates 31 adult prisons in California, with a design capacity of 85,083 incarcerated people.

CDCR operates a variety of other incarceration facilities, including fire camps and California Division of Juvenile Justice facilities.

== Facilities ==
Prison	Acronym	County	Opened	Reception center?	Reentry hub?	Design capacity	Incarcerated population	Percent occupied	Notes
Avenal State Prison	ASP	Kings	1987		Yes	2,920	4,197	143.7%	
California Correctional Institution	CCI	Kern	1954			2,783	3,516	126.3%	Opened in 1954 on the site of the former California Institute for Women, which opened in 1932 and closed in 1952 after the 1952 Kern County earthquake.
California Health Care Facility	CHCF	San Joaquin	2013			2,951	2,751	93.2%	Opened in 2013 on the site of the former Karl Holton Drug and Alcohol Abuse Treatment Center, which opened in 1968 and closed in 2003 as part of consolidation efforts in response to a decline in youth incarceration.
California Institution for Men	CIM	San Bernardino	1941	Yes	Yes	2,976	3,357	112.8%	
California Institution for Women	CIW	San Bernardino	1952	Yes	Yes	1,398	1,553	111.1%	The original California Institution for Women was opened in 1932 on the site of the current California Correctional Institution. That facility was closed in 1952 after the 1952 Kern County earthquake, and the women incarcerated in that facility were moved to the current CIW location, which had just opened.
California Medical Facility	CMF	Solano	1955			2,361	2,396	101.5%	
California Men's Colony	CMC	San Luis Obispo	1954	Yes	Yes	3,838	3,727	97.1%	
California Rehabilitation Center	CRC	Riverside	1962	Yes		2,491	3,341	134.1%	The facility, formerly a Naval hospital, was donated by the federal government in 1962. Women were incarcerated at CRC until 2007.
California State Prison, Centinela	CEN	Imperial	1993			2,308	3,284	142.3%	
California State Prison, Corcoran	COR	Kings	1988			3,116	3,719	119.4%	
California State Prison, Los Angeles County	LAC	Los Angeles	1993		Yes	2,300	3,158	137.3%	
California State Prison, Sacramento	SAC	Sacramento	1986			1,828	2,363	129.3%	
California State Prison, Solano	SOL	Solano	1984			2,610	3,752	143.8%	
California Substance Abuse Treatment Facility and State Prison, Corcoran	SATF	Kings	1997		Yes	3,424	4,844	141.5%	
Calipatria State Prison	CAL	Imperial	1992			2,308	2,935	127.2%	
Central California Women's Facility	CCWF	Madera	1990	Yes	Yes	2,004	2,640	131.7%	California's only death row for women is at CCWF.
Correctional Training Facility	CTF	Monterey	1948		Yes	3,312	4,801	145.0%	
Folsom State Prison	FSP	Sacramento	1880		Yes for women	2,066 men, 403 women	2,694 men, 276 women	130.4% capacity (men's facilities), 68.5% capacity (women's facilities)	FSP is the only California State Prison currently housing men and women.
High Desert State Prison	HDSP	Lassen	1995		Yes	2,324	3,286	141.4%	
Ironwood State Prison	ISP	Riverside	1994		Yes	2,200	3,203	145.6%	
Kern Valley State Prison	KVSP	Kern	2005			2,448	3,534	144.4%	
Mule Creek State Prison	MCSP	Amador	1987			3,284	3,948	120.2%	
North Kern State Prison	NKSP	Kern	1993	Yes		2,694	3,630	134.7%	
Pelican Bay State Prison	PBSP	Del Norte	1989			2,380	2,608	109.6%	
Pleasant Valley State Prison	PVSP	Fresno	1994			2,308	3,062	132.7%	
Richard J. Donovan Correctional Facility	RJD	San Diego	1987	Yes		2,992	3,806	127.2%	
Salinas Valley State Prison	SVSP	Monterey	1996			2,452	2,877	117.3%	
San Quentin State Prison	SQ	Marin	1852	Yes	Not formally designated, but has substantial reentry programming	3,082	3,776	122.5%	California's only death row for men is at San Quentin. The prison was constructed by incarcerated men on the Waban, a ship anchored in San Francisco Bay and California's first prison.
Sierra Conservation Center	SCC	Tuolumne	1965	Yes		3,836	4,012	104.6%	
Valley State Prison	VSP	Madera	1995		Yes	1,980	2,971	150.1%	
Wasco State Prison	WSP	Kern	1991	Yes		2,984	4,121	138.1%	
System-wide						91,967	114,654	124.7%	

Reception centers house incarcerate people incoming to the state prison system while they complete an evaluation and receive a custody score. After that, they may be transferred to another prison for longer-term confinement.

While all facilities have some level of education, treatment, and pre-release programs, reentry hubs provide specific reentry support to incarcerated people within 4 years of release, including cognitive behavioral therapy, job search skills, and financial literacy.

== Retired facilities ==
=== Prisons in California ===
- Eagle Mountain Community Correctional Facility, Eagle Mountain, California (owned and operated by Management and Training Corporation, closed in 2003)
- Deuel Vocational Institution, San Joaquin County, California, (closed in 2021)
- California Correctional Center, Lassen County, California, (closed March 30, 2023)
- Chuckawalla Valley State Prison, Riverside County, California (1988 to November 4, 2024)
- California City Correctional Facility, Kern County, California, (operated from 2013 to 2024, owned by and leased from CoreCivic)

=== Out of State Facilities ===
In an effort to relieve California prison overcrowding that peaked in 2006, CDCR began housing California prisoners in prisons in other states. In 2009, CDCR began to phase out its use of out-of-state facilities, and it stopped incarcerating people in out-of-state facilities in 2019. The facilities were:

- West Tennessee Detention Facility, Tennessee (owned and operated by CoreCivic, exited in March 2009)
- North Lake Correctional Facility, Michigan (owned and operated by Geo Group, operated by the Michigan Department of Corrections, exited October 2011)
- Red Rock Correctional Center, Arizona (owned by CoreCivic, operated by the Arizona Department of Corrections, exited in October 2013)
- North Fork Correctional Facility, Oklahoma (owned by CoreCivic, operated by the Oklahoma Department of Corrections, exited in November 2015)
- Florence Correctional Facility, Arizona (owned and operated by CoreCivic, exited in Feb. 2016)
- Tallahatchie County Correctional Facility, Mississippi (owned and operated by CoreCivic, exited in July 2018)
- La Palma Correctional Facility, Arizona (owned and operated by CoreCivic, exited in June 2019)

== See also ==
- Prisons in California
- Incarceration in California
