= Corcoran, California =

City in California, United States

- City
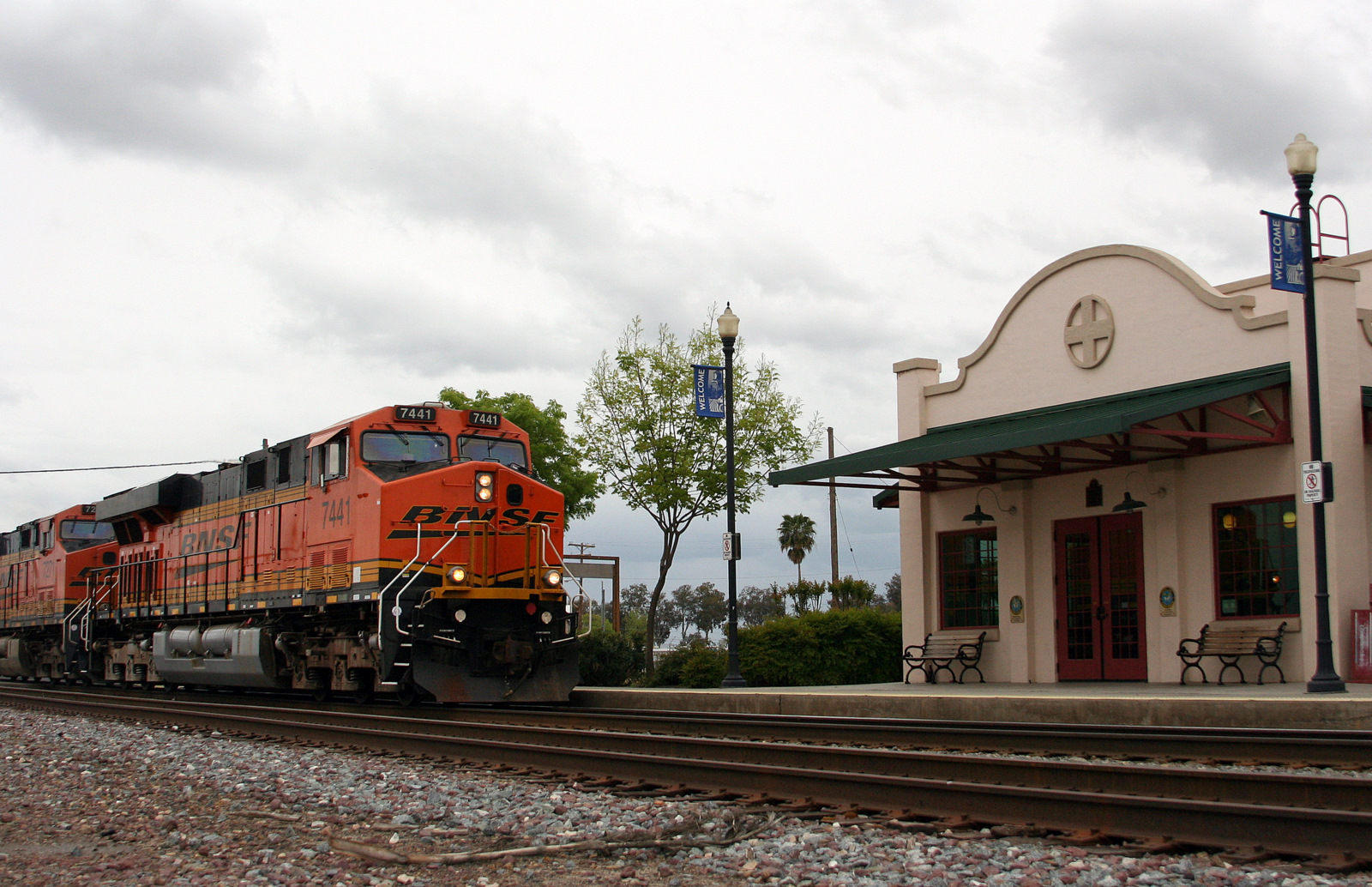
- Amtrak station in Corcoran (2010)

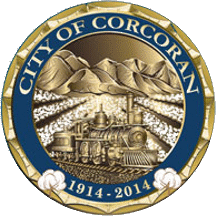
- Seal
- Interactive map of Corcoran, California
- Coordinates: 36°5′52.83″N 119°33′37.45″W
- Country: United States
- State: California
- County: Kings
- Incorporated: 1914

Government
  - Mayor: Sidonio "Sid" Palmerin
  - City Manager: Greg Gatzka

Area
  - Total: 7.46 sq mi (19.32 km^{2})
  - Land: 7.46 sq mi (19.32 km^{2})
  - Water: 0 sq mi (0.00 km^{2}) 0%
- Elevation: 207 ft (63 m)

Population (2020)
  - Total: 22,339
  - Density: 2,995.5/sq mi (1,156.55/km^{2})
- Time zone: UTC-8 (Pacific (PST))
  - Summer (DST): UTC-7 (PDT)
- ZIP code: 93212
- Area code: 559
- FIPS code: 06-16224
- GNIS feature ID: 1652690
- Website: cityofcorcoran.ca.gov

Corcoran is a city in Kings County, California, United States. As of the 2020 census, its population was 22,339, down from 24,813 (2010 census). Corcoran is located 17 miles (27 km) south-southeast of Hanford, at an elevation of 207 ft (63 m).

Corcoran is most notable as the site of the California State Prison, Corcoran. The California Substance Abuse Treatment Facility and State Prison, Corcoran is a separate facility that is also located in the city. As of January 1, 2015, the two prisons held a combined total of 9,592 inmates. Inmates are counted as city residents by both the United States Census and the California Department of Finance. Thus, the incarcerated people in the two prisons comprise just over 43% of the total population of Corcoran.

== History ==
Corcoran was founded by Hobart Johnstone Whitley, a prominent land developer from southern California, who took the lead in building Corcoran (the main street of the community is named in his honor). Liking what he saw during a visit to the area in 1905 (a blacksmith shop, small store, scattered homes and a lush, untapped vista with herds of grazing wild hogs, horses and steers) Whitley purchased 32,000 acres (130 km^{2}) to start development. Much like in the San Fernando Valley (Van Nuys and Canoga Park his "creations"), Whitley "leveraged" his holdings with the support of important Los Angeles businessmen. Whitley first intended the town be named "Otis", after Harrison Gray Otis of the Los Angeles Times, and streets as Otis, Sherman, Letts (the Broadway store) and Ross (after his son, Ross Whitley) show the connections. Whitley, it is claimed, purchased and platted some 150 towns over the American West—and Corcoran is one of his last.

Whitley moved a member of his real estate firm, J. W. Guiberson, to the area. Guiberson became one of the many pioneers of the community, building the first home and business structure in Corcoran. His family also helped establish the first church in the community, an event which helped lead to the town's incorporation on August 14, 1914.

The basis of Corcoran's economy then and now is agriculture. Initially, the most successful crops were grains, alfalfa and sugar beets.

In 1933, more than 12,000 workers went on strike against cotton farmers, one of the largest California agricultural strikes of 1933. Strikers in Corcoran created a tent city that eventually held more than 3,000 people, more than double the town's population. Its lack of water or sewage systems created waves of illness. Streets were staked out in the tent city, and committees of workers governed the camp.

The J. G. Boswell Company was established in Corcoran in 1921 and remains a major employer in the city.

The first post office opened in 1901.

== Geography ==
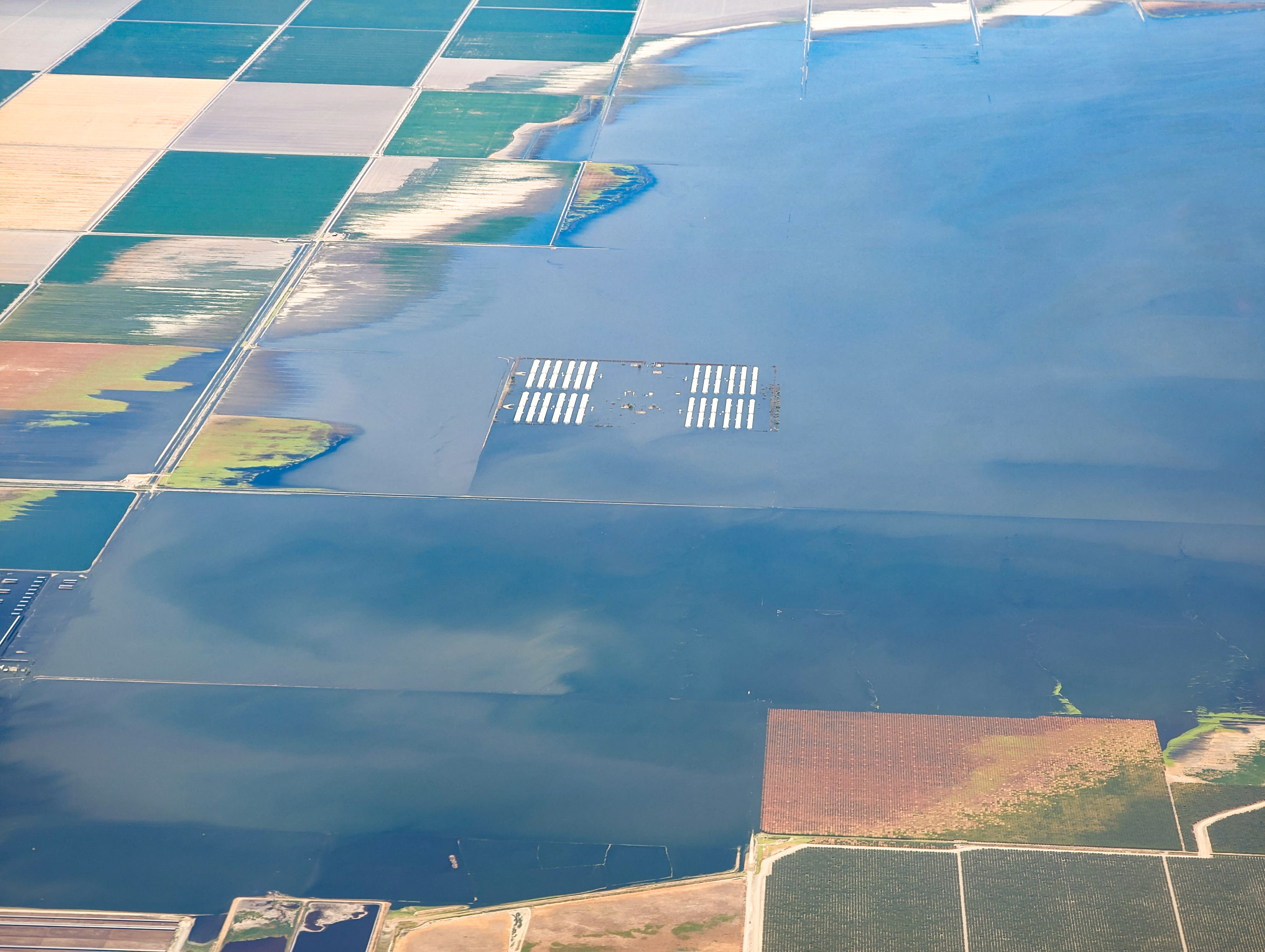
2023 flooding, showing inundated farmland and a flooded CAFO (animal feeding) facility.

Corcoran is located at 36°05′53″N 119°33′37″W.

According to the United States Census Bureau, the city has a total area of 7.5 square miles (19 km^{2}), all land.

The ground under Corcoran is subsiding due to withdrawal of groundwater by agricultural interests. There had been up to 11.5 feet (3.5 meters) of subsidence over a fourteen-year period.

Soils around Corcoran are somewhat poorly drained to poorly drained loam or fine sandy loam which is often saline as in the widespread Lakeside series. Other important soil series include the Armona, Gambogy, Grangeville, Kimberlina, and Lemoore. Corcoran is occasionally subject to areal flooding due to its position in a basin. Notable flood years include 1983 and 2023.

=== Climate ===
Corcoran

Climate chart (precipitation, max. and min. temperature)
| J | F | M | A | M | J | J | A | S | O | N | D |
| 1.5 54 38 | 1.5 62 41 | 1.4 68 44 | 0.5 76 47 | 0.2 85 53 | 0.1 93 59 | 0 98 63 | 0 96 62 | 0.2 91 59 | 0.4 81 51 | 0.8 65 41 | 0.9 54 36 |
- █ Average max. and min. temperatures in °F
- █ Precipitation totals in inches
- Source: US Climate Data
Metric conversion
| J | F | M | A | M | J | J | A | S | O | N | D |
| 38 12 3 | 39 17 5 | 36 20 7 | 13 24 8 | 6.1 29 12 | 2 34 15 | 0 37 17 | 0 36 17 | 6.1 33 15 | 9.9 27 11 | 19 18 5 | 24 12 2 |
- █ Average max. and min. temperatures in °C
- █ Precipitation totals in mm

== Demographics ==
Historical population
| Census | Pop. | Note | %± |
|---|---|---|---|
| 1920 | 1,101 | | — |
| 1930 | 1,768 | | 60.6% |
| 1940 | 2,092 | | 18.3% |
| 1950 | 3,150 | | 50.6% |
| 1960 | 4,976 | | 58.0% |
| 1970 | 5,249 | | 5.5% |
| 1980 | 6,454 | | 23.0% |
| 1990 | 13,364 | | 107.1% |
| 2000 | 14,458 | | 8.2% |
| 2010 | 24,813 | | 71.6% |
| 2020 | 22,339 | | −10.0% |
| 2025 (est.) | 22,358 | ▲ | 0.1% |
U.S. Decennial Census

Corcoran is part of the Hanford-Corcoran metropolitan area.

=== 2020 census ===
As of the 2020 census, Corcoran had a population of 22,339. The population density was 2,995.3 inhabitants per square mile (1,156.5/km^{2}). The median age was 35.6 years. 19.8% of residents were under the age of 18, 8.5% were aged 18 to 24, 38.9% were aged 25 to 44, 25.1% were aged 45 to 64, and 7.8% were 65 years of age or older. For every 100 females, there were 224.2 males, and for every 100 females age 18 and over, there were 281.4 males.

The census reported that 60.6% of the population lived in households and 39.4% were institutionalized. 99.6% of residents lived in urban areas, while 0.4% lived in rural areas.

There were 4,033 households, out of which 49.4% included children under the age of 18, 44.4% were married-couple households, 9.1% were cohabiting couple households, 28.6% had a female householder with no spouse or partner present, and 17.9% had a male householder with no spouse or partner present. 17.6% of households were one person, and 8.0% were one person aged 65 or older. The average household size was 3.35. There were 3,104 families (77.0% of all households).

There were 4,249 housing units at an average density of 569.7 units per square mile (220.0 units/km^{2}), of which 94.9% were occupied. Of occupied housing units, 51.4% were owner-occupied and 48.6% were occupied by renters. 5.1% of housing units were vacant. The homeowner vacancy rate was 1.7% and the rental vacancy rate was 2.6%.

Racial composition as of the 2020 census
| Race | Number | Percent |
|---|---|---|
| White | 5,931 | 26.5% |
| Black or African American | 2,914 | 13.0% |
| American Indian and Alaska Native | 420 | 1.9% |
| Asian | 195 | 0.9% |
| Native Hawaiian and Other Pacific Islander | 39 | 0.2% |
| Some other race | 10,411 | 46.6% |
| Two or more races | 2,429 | 10.9% |
| Hispanic or Latino (of any race) | 15,538 | 69.6% |

=== 2010 census ===
The 2010 United States census reported that Corcoran had a population of 24,813. The population density was 3,323.2 inhabitants per square mile (1,283.1/km^{2}). The racial makeup of Corcoran was 8,940 (36.0%) White, 3,725 (15.0%) African American, 349 (1.4%) Native American, 193 (0.8%) Asian, 17 (0.1%) Pacific Islander, 10,979 (44.2%) from other races, and 610 (2.5%) from two or more races. Hispanic or Latino of any race were 15,545 people (62.6%).

The Census reported that 12,573 people (50.7% of the population) lived in households, 116 (0.5%) lived in non-institutionalized group quarters, and 12,124 (48.9%) were institutionalized.

There were 3,594 households, out of which 1,981 (55.1%) had children under the age of 18 living in them, 1,737 (48.3%) were opposite-sex married couples living together, 781 (21.7%) had a female householder with no husband present, 376 (10.5%) had a male householder with no wife present. There were 384 (10.7%) unmarried opposite-sex partnerships, and 19 (0.5%) same-sex married couples or partnerships. 556 households (15.5%) were made up of individuals, and 214 (6.0%) had someone living alone who was 65 years of age or older. The average household size was 3.50. There were 2,894 families (80.5% of all households); the average family size was 3.84.

The population was spread out, with 4,434 people (17.9%) under the age of 18, 2,695 people (10.9%) aged 18 to 24, 10,203 people (41.1%) aged 25 to 44, 6,163 people (24.8%) aged 45 to 64, and 1,318 people (5.3%) who were 65 years of age or older. The median age was 35.0 years. For every 100 females, there were 294.8 males. For every 100 females age 18 and over, there were 398.0 males.

There were 3,958 dwelling units at an average density of 530.1 per square mile (204.7/km^{2}), of which 1,851 (51.5%) were owner-occupied, and 1,743 (48.5%) were occupied by renters. The homeowner vacancy rate was 1.7%; the rental vacancy rate was 11.8%. 6,607 people (26.6% of the population) lived in owner-occupied housing units and 5,966 people (24.0%) lived in rental housing units.

== Economy ==
At the time of the 2000 census, the median income for a household in the city was $30,783, and the median income for a family was $32,852. Males had a median income of $30,787 versus $21,792 for females. The per capita income for the city was only $13,458. It is noteworthy that about 23.4% of families and 26.9% of the population were below the poverty line, including 36.4% of those under age 18 and 10.6% of those age 65 or over.

Many local residents are employed in agriculture. However, the community has been affected by the Great Recession as well as the decline of the cotton industry, the California drought and restrictions on pumping from the Sacramento River delta to protect endangered species. In November 2016, the unemployment rate was 11.1%.

The largest employers in Corcoran include the California State Prison, Corcoran, the California Substance Abuse Treatment Facility and State Prison, Corcoran, the Corcoran Unified School District, and the J. G. Boswell Company.

== Government ==
Corcoran employs 21 full time personnel including 15 uniformed officers, two detectives, one evidence technician, one community service officer, five clerk-dispatchers, two reserve officers, and Animal Control Services. Kings County Fire Department provides firemen who provide services with the assistance of volunteers. Industrial sites—There are approximately 320 acres in the city limits zones for light and heavy industry with two industrial parks included in this total.

=== Politics ===
Corcoran is located within California's 22nd congressional district, and is represented by Democrat Randy Villegas.

In the California State Legislature, Corcoran is located within:

- 16th California State Senate District, which is represented by Democrat Melissa Hurtado
- 33rd California State Assembly District, represented by Republican Alexandra Macedo.

Corcoran is represented on the Kings County Board of Supervisors by Richard Valle of Corcoran.

== Education ==
Corcoran Unified School District is the public organization responsible for education in the town of Corcoran. The school district has seven schools.

- Bret Harte
- John C. Fremont
- Mark Twain
- John Muir Middle School
- Corcoran High School
- Corcoran Academy
- Kings Lake Educational Center

== Infrastructure ==
=== Railroads ===
Corcoran is served by the BNSF Railway, which is the successor to the Santa Fe Railway. The mainline track through Corcoran was part of a route connecting the San Francisco Bay Area to Bakersfield, California. The track was constructed by the San Francisco and San Joaquin Valley Railway about 1898.

Corcoran was the southern terminus of the Visalia District, a branch line running to Calwa via Tulare, Visalia, and Reedley. This line was abandoned and the rails pulled up in the 1990s. Only the wye and a short section of track remain to serve a lineside industry.

Today, Amtrak California's Gold Runner stops at Corcoran station.

From 1910 to 1934, the Kings Lake Shore Railroad operated a line that ran southwest from Corcoran to what is the now-extinct Tulare Lake.

On December 2, 2010, the California High-Speed Rail Authority Board voted to start construction of the first part of the California High-Speed Rail line at Borden near Madera and continue it to Corcoran. Construction began in 2012.

== See also ==
- Corcoran Prisoner of War Branch Camp
