= 1991 Sacramento hostage crisis =

Fatal hostage crisis in California

Coordinates: 38.499852°N 121.431832°W

- Hostages lined up at the front doors
- Location: Sacramento County, California, U.S.
- Date: April 4, 1991; 35 years ago 2:00 p.m. – 10:00 p.m.
- Attack type: Hostage-taking, siege, mass shooting, mass murder
- Weapons: Three pistols; shotgun
- Deaths: 6 (including 3 suspects)
- Injuries: 14 (11 by gunfire, including 1 perpetrator)
- Perpetrators: Loi Khac Nguyen, Pham Khac Nguyen, Long Khac Nguyen, and Cuong Tran

On April 4, 1991, 41 employees and customers were taken hostage by four gunmen and held at a Good Guys! electronics store at the corner of 65th Street and Stockton Boulevard in Sacramento, California, near Florin Mall (now Florin Towne Centre) for approximately eight hours. Near the end of the hostage crisis, six were killed: three hostages and three of the four hostage-takers. The fourth hostage-taker was captured by authorities, and an additional 14 hostages were injured during the crisis. To this day, the hostage crisis remains the largest hostage rescue operation in US history, with over 40 hostages having been held at gunpoint.

== Event ==
=== Background ===
The four gunmen were all Vietnamese immigrants: brothers Loi Khac Nguyen, 21; Pham Khac Nguyen, 19; and Long Khac Nguyen, 17; and their friend, Cuong Tran, 17. The Nguyens had fled Vietnam as a family of eight in 1979 at the start of the second wave of Vietnamese refugees, first sailing to Malaysia and remaining anchored there for the first seven months, then waiting for four more months in an Indonesian refugee camp before they arrived in California in 1980. The entire family lived in a two-bedroom apartment not far from the Good Guys! store. Cuong Tran had moved with his parents into a new home in Elk Grove 15 months before the hostage crisis.

Tran and Long Nguyen were friends and classmates at Florin High School; both had been expelled in March 1991 after stealing athletic equipment and attempting to set fire to the building. Loi Nguyen had attended Valley High School but dropped out during his senior year. Pham Nguyen was attending William Daylor High School (a continuation school) after having transferred from Valley following attendance issues.

On the day of the hostage crisis, Pham Nguyen briefly came to school and asked to be excused with a toothache. The Nguyen brothers told their parents they were going fishing at the Sacramento River.

=== Start of the siege ===
At approximately 1:00 p.m., on April 4, 1991, the four perpetrators drove into the parking lot of the Good Guys! electronics store, in the South Area of Sacramento County. The group left their vehicle, a 1982 Toyota Corolla, and entered the store armed with three pistols and a shotgun. Loi Nguyen had purchased the guns legally at a local sporting goods store the prior week, following a background check and waiting period. Although reported, the gunmen were not members of the Oriental Boys gang, and the hostage-taking and subsequent crisis were not considered to be gang-related.

They herded customers and staff into a group, including a shoplifter attempting to leave the store, and began shooting at the ceiling of the store. One employee escaped after being ordered to lock the doors. Although initial reports indicated they had taken the hostages after a failed robbery attempt, subsequent statements to hostages and negotiators instead proved "they were attempting to gain notoriety," according to Sacramento County Sheriff Glen Craig. They were frustrated with their lives in the United States since it was difficult to find good jobs and expressed a desire to travel to Thailand and fight the Viet Cong, according to two of the hostages.

=== Law enforcement and media response ===
When the 9-1-1 call came in at 1:33 p.m., the Sacramento County Sheriff's Department Special Enforcement Detail (SED) was already in the process of gearing up in anticipation of executing a previously planned drug raid. They immediately paged off-duty team members and began preparations to rush to the scene along with the Department's Critical Incident Negotiations Team (CINT) and other local and state law enforcement agencies.

As the situation developed, the local media descended on the area in force, broadcasting the unfolding incident. They were able to get footage of the event because of the store's huge glass front doors, which allowed video crews to see into the store where the hostage-takers lined up some of the hostages in front of the entrance as human shields.

=== Surveillance and negotiation ===
Following the standard operating procedure, the team obtained a floor plan of the building, which was copied and distributed to team members. The SED team was told that there was only one entrance to the store that was not alarmed: a freight entrance located at the rear of the store. Their only option would be to enter the store's showroom, where the hostages were being held, through a fabrics store on the north side of the building. The entry team gained entrance to the fabric store and slowly moved into position. The criminals apparently heard movement by the police amid shouts of "stay away from the door" coming from inside the store itself.

One of the entry team members removed a ceiling panel in the hallway between the two buildings and inserted a pole-mounted mirror. He was able to observe the subjects directing hostages to place large boxes against the back door to block entry. Once the door was barricaded, the area was abandoned. A fisheye camera was installed by the team but was of limited use because of the design of the store, showing only a portion of the showroom near the door. By this time, the hostages had been tied up with speaker wire and had been arranged inside the store's glass front entrance doors in standing and kneeling positions.

For more than two hours, the department's CINT tried to end the incident peacefully by negotiating with the hostage-takers. Negotiations were initially conducted from police headquarters, and a special negotiation team took over on-site after a few hours from a bank that had been evacuated. The hostage-takers demanded $4 million, forty 1,000-year-old ginseng roots, four bulletproof vests, a 50-troop military helicopter, and transportation for everyone to Thailand after a refueling stop in Alaska. Throughout the incident, the hostage-takers did not present a consistent set of demands to the negotiators.

One demand that remained constant was for bulletproof vests. During early negotiations, one of the requested vests was exchanged for what was to be the release of nine hostages, although only three were released initially; the police officer who took the first vest to them stripped to his underwear to prove he was unarmed. Loi Nguyen sent a woman to retrieve the vest and threatened to shoot her children if she did not return; after she retrieved the vest, they were the first three hostages to be released. In addition to the hostage exchange, another benefit was that it allowed police to gain information on the current situation in the store. One of the released hostages revealed that the shots heard earlier had been the hostage-takers shooting at the store's security cameras and that none of the hostages had been harmed up to this point. Soon thereafter, more shots were heard, but this was the hostage-takers testing the vest. Approximately an hour later, another woman and her three children were released; an eighth hostage was released at 8:20 p.m., bearing a message that they would start to shoot the other hostages shortly.

At one point during the negotiations, the leader of the hostage-takers, who called himself "Thai" (later shown to be Loi Nguyen), agreed to surrender to the police but only if they were allowed to retain their bulletproof vests and weapons while in prison. The police negotiator informed Loi Nguyen that he would have a short sentence and his vest and guns would be returned upon his release. He set down the phone and began to discuss the situation with his partners. At that point, many of the officers involved felt the exchanges might lead to a negotiated settlement; when he returned to the phone, Loi Nguyen stated that while he accepted those terms, his partners did not. Suddenly, the phone went dead, and the CINT immediately tried to re-establish contact with the store. On the first attempt, the phone was busy, and on the second attempt, a suspect calling himself "Number One" (later shown to be Long Nguyen) answered the phone, informing everyone that he was now in control. From that point on, the situation began to rapidly deteriorate. Shots were once again fired at the store's security cameras.

=== Entry ===
Audio of the SCSD's SED entering the store and engaging in a shootout with the gunmen

At approximately 9 p.m., Long Nguyen shot a twenty-year-old male hostage named Sean McIntyre in the leg and then released McIntyre as the ninth and final hostage to be released with the instruction to deliver their message and plight to the local media. They claimed they were trying to draw attention to the troubles of their home country and that they were on a suicide mission. At that point, the police attempted to distract the gunmen by putting the hostage on the news, which would also move them to the television area of the store, but this tactic did not work. The police team was finally given the "green light" to enter the store. Sniper Jeffrey Boyes would issue the signal to execute the assault. Boyes had received permission to fire on any subject on whom he could obtain a clear line of sight.

After McIntyre was shot and released, another hostage was shot just before 10 p.m.; the gunmen had told the hostages to select the next victim from among themselves, causing an elderly hostage, Harold Brooks, to faint. According to Sheriff Craig, the gunmen joked "he just decided he was going to be our next person shot." Long Nguyen attempted to shoot Brooks, but his gun misfired, and Loi Nguyen shot Brooks in the leg. The surviving hostages stated the gunmen divided them into two groups and had begun flipping a coin to decide their fates. Guns were placed to the hostages' heads. Several hostages were placed on the phone, and they informed the police the gunmen were going to begin executing hostages.

Hey, listen, I'm a hostage ... [The police] have a whole force full of jackets ... What's three more (expletive) jackets? Someone's going to die here because you guys are stupid.

— Fernando Gutierrez, a 28-year-old hostage who was killed, police negotiator recording, quoted in AP News story (December 19, 1991)

A second bulletproof vest was delivered to the front door shortly after Brooks was shot, which was to be exchanged for nine more hostages, but no one was released. Another hostage, Priscilla Alvarez, was sent out to recover the second vest with her wrists tied behind her and harnessed with more speaker cord. As the door was opened and Alvarez was halfway down the path to retrieve the vest, Boyes took a shot at one of the gunmen, but the sniper's bullet was deflected by the glass door as it swung shut, and it hit the target's ear.

Immediately, the hostage-takers ran back and forth, and Long Nguyen started to shoot the seated hostages who were tied down in a row behind the glass door, in full view of the news cameras broadcasting the event live. At the same time, Boyes radioed "Go", and the SED entry team immediately hit the door at 9:51 p.m. A stun grenade was tossed into the store from outside, and Curt Warburton, one of the Good Guys employees, managed to scramble to safety through the now shattered glass door. "Number One" (Long Nguyen), now stunned and disoriented, managed to stagger out of Boyes's sights and take cover behind a large pillar. He then immediately began firing his weapon at more bound hostages.

It took the seven-person entry team two to three seconds to get through the back doors from where they had been hiding (a storage space in the rear of the store) because of the "barricades" erected earlier. They then had to contend with the 100-foot (30 m) distance to the front of the store. The team was armed with a variety of weapons for the entry. Sergeants Don Devlin, Charles Price, and Gordon Smith were armed with SiGARMS Sig P220 pistols, Sergeant Bill Kelly carried a laser-sighted HK MP5, investigators Mike Hammel and Greg Peterson carried H&K MP5SD3 submachine guns, and investigator Roger Stanfill was armed with his AR-15.

Hammel and Price cleared the west side of the store, Peterson and Kelly the east side, and Devlin and Smith went straight up the middle. Stanfill took up a rearguard position. As the team began its movement toward the front of the store, the remaining hostage-takers immediately began to fire on the entry team and hostages. Peterson stepped on the wire that had been used to tether the female hostage sent out to recover the second vest. At that moment, she was snatched to safety by officers outside the store, causing Peterson's feet to fly out from under him, forcing him to fall backward, just as a shotgun blast immediately blew through the area where he was standing. His fellow team members mistakenly believed he had been struck in the face by the blast. As Peterson began to rise to his feet, Devlin and Kelly tried to flank the shotgun-wielding suspect, who fired on them once again, before being taken under fire by the team.

=== Suspects shot ===
Simultaneously, on the west side of the store, the team shot one of the suspects (Cuong Tran) before he could react. Then they spotted a second armed suspect (Pham Nguyen) and fired on him, but he disappeared into the chaos of the screaming and panicking crowd of hostages. Then, "Number One" (Long Nguyen) was shot.

At this point, the team could only account for three of the suspects and immediately began a systematic search for the fourth. Price and Hammel discovered an unarmed Asian male (Loi Nguyen) lying on the floor, wearing the sole bulletproof vest that had been provided earlier. Once he was rolled over, they discovered he had a .223-caliber entrance wound, accounting for all four suspects.

It took only 30 seconds from the initial police entry until the gunfire ceased, bringing an end to the hostage crisis.

== Aftermath ==
=== Casualties ===
During the assault, the suspects wounded eleven hostages and killed three. Of the eleven wounded, ten were shot, and one suffered a miscarriage. Others shot at were Bret Soren, Chris Lauretzen, Curt Warburton, and many others who suffered both physical and extreme emotional consequences including brutal bodily injuries, trauma, and severe ongoing symptoms of post-traumatic stress disorder (PTSD). Of the four suspects, three were killed by the entry team and one, "Thai" (Loi), was wounded. None of the SED entry team was wounded. The hostages killed were store employees Kris Edward Sohne and John Lee Fritz and customer Fernando Gutierrez.

Gutierrez's two nieces were also hostages. One of the nieces, Lisa Joseph, later wrote the book Heads or Tails: A True Hostage Story of Terror, Torture and Ultimate Survival about her ordeal. Two employees hid in a computer closet during the hostage crisis.

The Good Guys! announced they would set up trust funds for the two slain employees and would pay for the funerals of all three murder victims.

=== Trial and prosecution ===
Loi Nguyen was arraigned from his hospital bed shortly after the crisis ended and charged with 54 felonies, including murder. Nguyen's attorney, Sacramento public defender Linda Parisi, argued that Loi Nguyen was trying to make peace, based on witness testimony and recorded audio, and did not deserve the death penalty; she pointed to Long Nguyen as the leader. However, Rebecca Moore, a sheriff's detective, pointed out that Loi Nguyen had purchased the guns, driven the group to the store, and handled most of the negotiations: "In my opinion he is the most responsible party for this thing going down." Because of pre-trial publicity, the trial was moved to San Francisco. He was convicted on February 8, 1995, on 51 felony counts: three for murder, eight for attempted murder, two for assault with a firearm, and 38 for kidnapping, after two days of jury deliberation. On March 28, the jury recommended a life sentence in prison rather than the death penalty, after four more hours of deliberation.

At the sentencing hearing in Sacramento, Judge W.J. Harpham said, "It's hard to find the adjectives for the terror the defendant put these hostages through." He sentenced Loi Khac Nguyen to 49 life terms in prison, 41 to be served consecutively without the chance of parole. Information that surfaced at Nguyen's trial revealed the men's motivation for committing the crime was that they were frustrated by their inability to learn English and find jobs. Nguyen initially served his sentence at the California State Prison, Lancaster. he was later transferred to California State Prison, Centinela, then California State Prison, Solano. As of October 2026, he is housed at Valley State Prison, Chowchilla. His CDCR number is J69791.

The former Good Guys! building later became a Dollar Tree store, which was modified to move the main entry doors from the front (south facade) to the side of the building (east facade). This Dollar Tree still stands and remains in business.

== In popular culture ==
- In 2000, a play titled The Good Guys: An American Tragedy was created by Michael Edo Keane and Miko Lee and presented by Theater of Yugen, a theatre group that presents work relating to the Pan Asian Diaspora, at the Theater Artaud in San Francisco, California.
- The hostage crisis was examined in detail in the first season of the documentary series Shootout!, aired on the History Channel, for the first time in September 2005.
- Footage of the event was featured in World's Scariest Police Shootouts in 1997.
- In March 2015, the crisis was the focus of an episode of ABC's In an Instant.
- In 2019 a movie called A Clear Shot, based on the incident, was released. It starred Hao Do as Loi, Kevin Bach as Pham, Tony Dew as Long, and Dang Tran as Cuong.

== See also ==
- List of homicides in California
- 1996 Honolulu hostage crisis
