= Susanville Municipal Airport =

- IATA: SVE; ICAO: KSVE; FAA LID: SVE

Summary
- Airport type: Public
- Owner: City of Susanville
- Serves: Susanville, California
- Elevation AMSL: 4,149 ft / 1,265 m
- Coordinates: 40°22′32″N 120°34′22″W
- Interactive map of Susanville Municipal Airport

Runways
Direction	Length		Surface
Direction	ft	m	Surface
11/29	4,051	1,235	Asphalt
7/25	2,180	664	Dirt

Helipads
Number	Length		Surface
Number	ft	m	Surface
H1	120	37	Asphalt
H2	65	20	Asphalt

Statistics (2011)
- Aircraft operations: 12,470
- Based aircraft: 47
- Source: Federal Aviation Administration

Susanville Municipal Airport (IATA: SVE, ICAO: KSVE, FAA LID: SVE) is a city-owned, public-use airport located five nautical miles (6 mi, 9 km) southeast of the central business district of Susanville, a city in Lassen County, California, United States. It is included in the National Plan of Integrated Airport Systems for 2011–2015, which categorized it as a general aviation facility.

== Facilities and aircraft ==
Susanville Municipal Airport covers an area of 130 acres (53 ha) at an elevation of 4,149 feet (1,265 m) above mean sea level. It has two runways: 11/29 is 4,051 by 75 feet (1,235 x 23 m) with an asphalt surface and 7/25 is 2,180 by 60 feet (664 x 18 m) with a dirt surface. It also has two helipads: H1 is 120 by 120 feet (37 x 37 m) and H2 is 65 by 65 feet (20 x 20 m).

For the 12-month period ending December 31, 2011, the airport had 12,470 aircraft operations, an average of 34 per day: 93% general aviation, 6% air taxi, and <1% military. At that time there were 47 aircraft based at this airport: 81% single-engine, 11% multi-engine, 2% helicopter, and 6% ultralight.
