= Craig Coley =

American man wrongfully convicted of double homicide

Craig Richard Coley (born June 7, 1947 in Los Angeles County, California) is an American man who was wrongfully convicted of a double murder in Simi Valley, California, and spent 39 years in prison. He was pardoned by the governor of California in 2017 because DNA testing, not available at his original trial, did not support his conviction.

== Early life ==
Coley was born in June 1947 and was in the United States Navy during the Vietnam War. His service included several deployments to Vietnam aboard USS Enterprise and USS Bainbridge.

== Wicht murder case ==
On November 11, 1978, 24-year-old Rhonda Wicht and her 4-year-old son, Donald Wicht, were found dead in her apartment in Simi Valley, a suburb of Los Angeles, California. Donald Wicht had been suffocated and Rhonda Wicht had been raped, beaten and strangled. The police suspected Coley was the murderer because he had been Rhonda Wicht's boyfriend for two years and the couple had recently broken up, and because a neighbor also claimed to have seen him and his truck at the apartment after hearing commotion.

Coley was arrested the same day as the murders and charged with the double murder. The first trial resulted in a hung jury. The second trial in 1980 led to his conviction. The jury deliberated 80 minutes before recommending a sentence of life without parole instead of execution. After Coley lost his final appeal to his conviction, the judge ordered all evidence to be destroyed. During his imprisonment, Coley was incarcerated in the California State Prison, Los Angeles County and the Folsom State Prison.

== New investigation ==
Michael Bender, a serving detective with Simi Valley Police Department, started to re-investigate Coley's case in 1989 and discovered there were problems with it. Until their deaths, Coley's father and mother, a retired police officer and teacher respectively, had been trying to free their son. Simi Valley Police Chief Dave Livingstone requested a new investigation by cold case Detective Dan Swanson. Det. Swanson located missing evidence, and had it forensically examined. DNA testing, not available at the original trial, showed there was no trace of Coley's DNA on the evidence, but that there was the DNA of an unknown suspect. Investigators also disproved the testimony of a witness from the original trial who claimed to have seen Coley at the scene of the crime. In a report to the local police, three former and current police officers testified that the detective at the time of Coley's trial had “mishandled the investigation or framed Mr. Coley.” The local prosecutor felt the original detectives decided Coley was guilty too quickly and as a result had "tunnel vision".

== Pardon ==
California governor Jerry Brown pardoned Coley on November 22, 2017, because the evidence showed he was innocent of the murders. In February 2018, the California Victims Compensation Board awarded Coley almost $2 million in compensation for his wrongful imprisonment for almost 40 years.

On February 23, 2019, Coley received a $21 million settlement from the city of Simi Valley. City Manager Eric Levitt said of the case that "While no amount of money can make up for what happened to Mr Coley, settling this case is the right thing to do for Mr Coley and our community. The monetary cost of going to trial would be astronomical and it would be irresponsible for us to move forward in that direction". Of the $21 million that Coley would be awarded, Simi Valley city said they will pay about $4.9 million, with the remainder to be made up by other sources, including insurance.

Coley’s prison term, at nearly 39 years, is the longest in California for someone whose conviction had been overturned. Coley’s time behind bars is the 14th-longest nationwide for a proven wrongful conviction case.

After Coley's release and the subsequent arrest of serial killer Joseph James DeAngelo, DNA testing was conducted to see if he was the real murderer. DNA testing subsequently cleared both Coley and DeAngelo and the actual killer remains unknown.
