= Susanville, California =

City in California, United States

- City
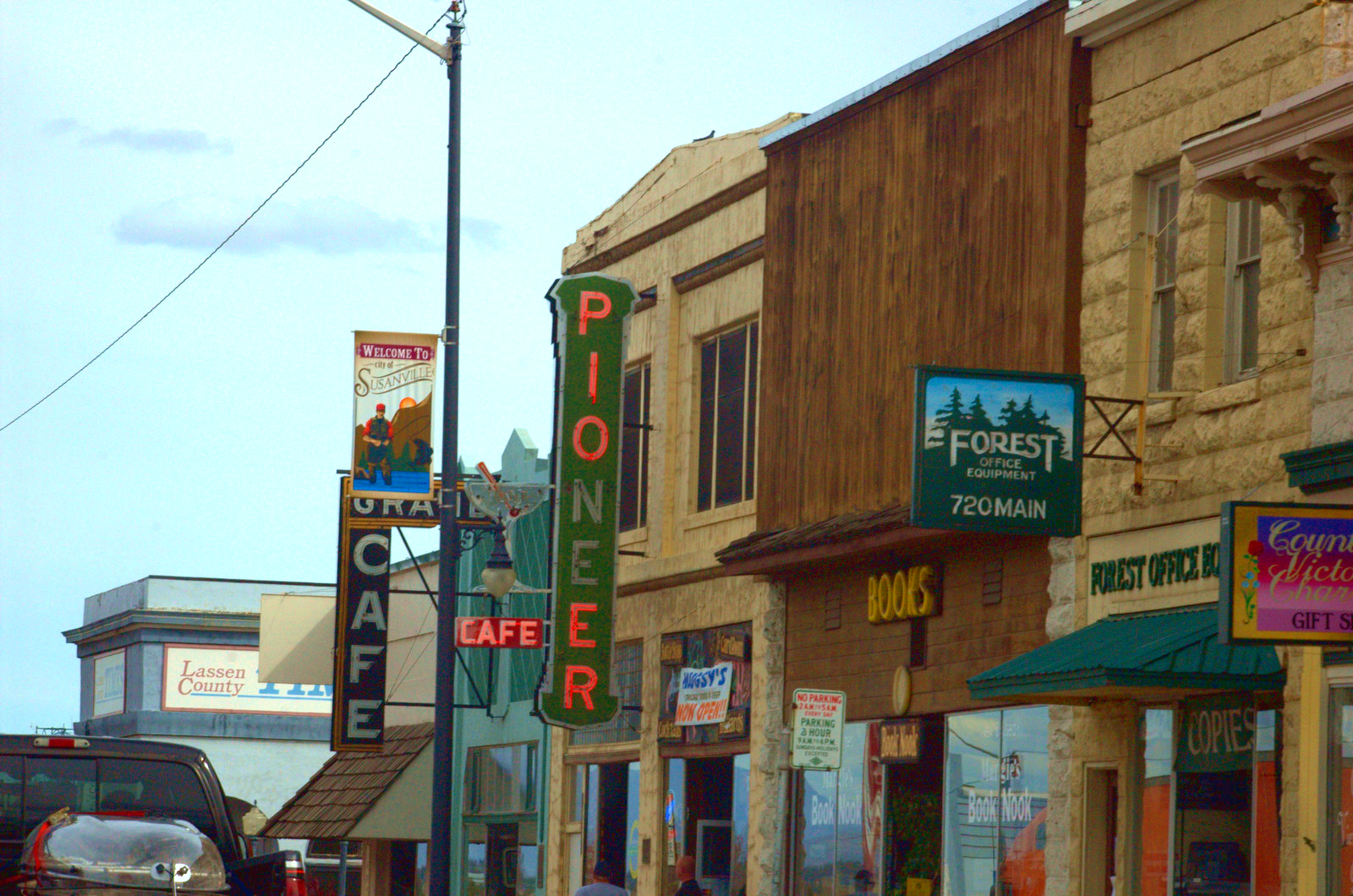
- Historic Uptown Susanville
- Nickname: The Hub of Northeastern California
- Interactive map of Susanville, California
- Location within California Location within the United States
- Coordinates: 40°24′59″N 120°39′11″W
- Country: United States
- State: California
- County: Lassen
- Incorporated: August 24, 1900
- Named for: Susan Roop

Government
  - Mayor: Mendy Schuster

Area
  - Total: 8.00 sq mi (20.73 km^{2})
  - Land: 7.92 sq mi (20.51 km^{2})
  - Water: 0.085 sq mi (0.22 km^{2}) 1.06%
- Elevation: 4,186 ft (1,276 m)

Population (2020)
  - Total: 16,728
  - Density: 2,105.2/sq mi (812.83/km^{2})
- Demonym: Susanvillain
- Time zone: UTC-08:00 (PST)
  - Summer (DST): UTC-07:00 (PDT)
- ZIP codes: 96127, 96130
- Area codes: 530, 837
- FIPS code: 06-77364
- GNIS feature IDs: 277619, 2412017
- Website: cityofsusanville.gov

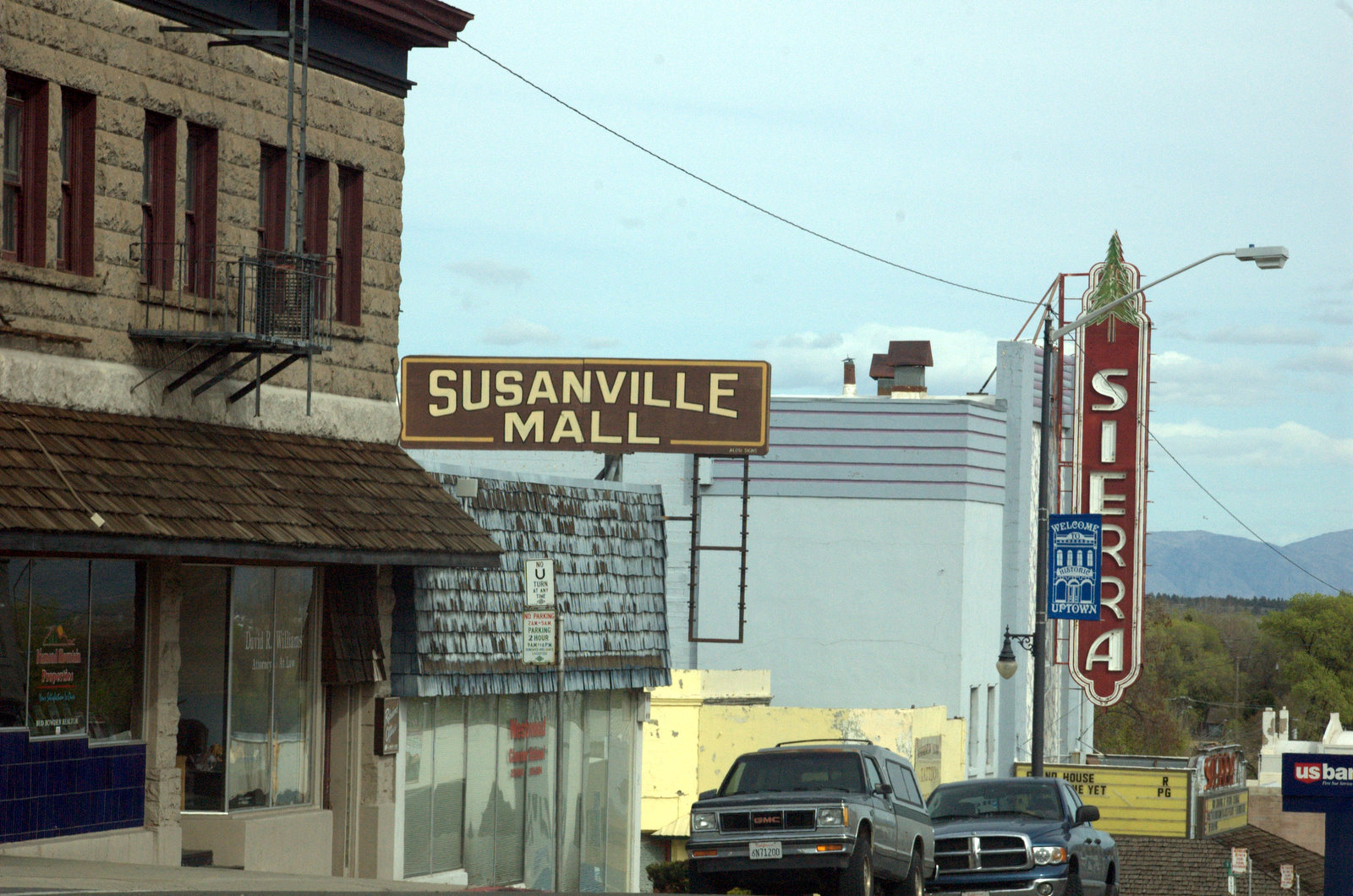
Another view of Uptown Susanville

Susanville (formerly known as Rooptown) (Northeast Maidu: Pam Sewim K'odom, bush creek country) is the only incorporated city in Lassen County, California, United States, of which it is also the county seat. Susanville is located on the Susan River in the southern part of the county, at an elevation of 4,186 feet (1,276 m). Its population is 16,728 as of the 2020 census, down from 17,947 from the 2010 census. The Susanville urban area contains 8,995 people and 4,233 households.

Susanville, a former logging and mining town, is the site of the High Desert State Prison, California (not to be confused with High Desert State Prison, Nevada), which opened in 1995. The Federal Correctional Institution, Herlong is nearby, having opened in 2001.

The prisons and their effects on the community, including the addition of local jobs, were explored in the documentary Prison Town, USA (2007), aired on PBS. Nearly half the adult population of Susanville works at the three prisons in the area, where 6,000 people are incarcerated.

== Etymology ==
It was originally known as Rooptown, named for Isaac Roop, a pioneer of the Honey Lake District. Roop later renamed the town Susanville in honor of his daughter, Susan Roop Arnold (1841-1921) in 1857.

== History ==
The Susanville US post office was established in 1860. Early in its history, Susanville was a hub for overland freight transit, as it marked the meeting point of Nobles Emigrant Trail from Nevada and the Humboldt Wagon Road leading west to Chico. Susanville was incorporated in 1900.

Formerly the center of farming, mining and the lumber industry, Susanville suffered from the loss of jobs as these industries changed or declined in the 20th century. Since the late 20th century, the only area of growth in the economy has been associated with the construction and operation of two state prisons in the city and one federal prison in the area. In 2007, half of the adult population of Susanville worked in the prisons: the California Correctional Center, a minimum-medium security facility, which opened in 1963; the High Desert State Prison, California (not to be confused with High Desert State Prison, Nevada), which opened in 1995; and the Federal Correctional Institution, Herlong, which opened in 2007.

== Geography ==
Susanville is located at the head of Honey Lake Valley, 40 miles (64 km) east of Lassen Peak. The elevation is approximately 4,186 feet (1,276 m) above sea level. It is considered a gateway city to Reno on U.S. Route 395.

According to the United States Census Bureau, the city has a total area of 8.02 square miles (20.7 km^{2}), of which 7.94 square miles (20.51 km^{2}) or 98.94% is land and 0.08 square miles (0.22 km^{2}) or 1.06% is water.

=== Geology ===
Susanville is underlain by igneous rock, which provides the parent material for its well-drained brown stony to gravelly sandy loams or loams. On the western outskirts under forest cover, the soils are often reddish brown. The most common soil series in Susanville's urban area is Springmeyer gravelly fine sandy loam.

=== Climate ===
Susanville has a cool Mediterranean climate (Köppen Csb) bordering on a continental Mediterranean climate (Dsb) with cool winters and hot, mostly dry summers, except for occasional afternoon thunderstorms. Records have been kept at several stations since 1895, including Susanville Airport and Susanville 2 SW, southwest of the town center. There are two other area stations with shorter records.

Temperatures reach 90 °F (32.2 °C) or higher on an average of 30.8 afternoons annually, and drop to 32 °F (0 °C) or lower on an average of 148.7 mornings annually. Freezing temperatures have been recorded in every month of the year, and summer nighttime temperatures are usually cool, but extreme cold is rare: 0 °F (−17.8 °C) was not reached between 2014 and 2020 and fewer than two mornings on average reach that temperature. The highest recorded temperature in Susanville was 106 °F (41.1 °C) on July 25, 1928, and July 19–20, 1931, and the lowest recorded temperature was −23 °F (−30.6 °C) on February 1, 1956.

Annual precipitation averages 13.02 inches (331 mm), with an average of 38.7 days with measurable precipitation. The wettest calendar year has been 1907 with 33.51 inches (851.2 mm) and the driest 1976 with 5.33 inches (135.4 mm), though the wettest rain year was from July 1937 to June 1938 with 33.01 inches (838.5 mm) as against 32.42 inches (823.5 mm) between July 1906 and June 1907 and 4.36 inches (110.7 mm) in the driest rain year from July 1975 to June 1976. The most precipitation in one month was 12.30 inches (312.4 mm) in March 1907, and the most in 24 hours 5.04 inches (128.0 mm) on January 31, 1897. The most snowfall in one year was 114 inches (2.9 m) in 1937, with the most in one month being 65.5 inches (1.7 m) in January 1895.

Climate data for Susanville, California, 1991–2020 normals, extremes 1895–present
Month	Jan	Feb	Mar	Apr	May	Jun	Jul	Aug	Sep	Oct	Nov	Dec	Year
Record high °F (°C)	68 (20)	69 (21)	81 (27)	90 (32)	96 (36)	102 (39)	106 (41)	105 (41)	101 (38)	90 (32)	83 (28)	65 (18)	106 (41)
Mean maximum °F (°C)	54.4 (12.4)	59.6 (15.3)	69.4 (20.8)	76.9 (24.9)	85.1 (29.5)	92.2 (33.4)	96.8 (36.0)	95.2 (35.1)	90.4 (32.4)	79.9 (26.6)	67.7 (19.8)	55.6 (13.1)	97.8 (36.6)
Mean daily maximum °F (°C)	42.7 (5.9)	47.6 (8.7)	54.2 (12.3)	60.5 (15.8)	69.3 (20.7)	78.9 (26.1)	88.0 (31.1)	86.6 (30.3)	80.0 (26.7)	67.0 (19.4)	51.9 (11.1)	42.6 (5.9)	64.1 (17.8)
Daily mean °F (°C)	32.5 (0.3)	36.6 (2.6)	41.9 (5.5)	47.1 (8.4)	54.8 (12.7)	62.9 (17.2)	70.6 (21.4)	69.3 (20.7)	62.7 (17.1)	51.5 (10.8)	40.0 (4.4)	32.4 (0.2)	50.2 (10.1)
Mean daily minimum °F (°C)	22.3 (−5.4)	25.6 (−3.6)	29.6 (−1.3)	33.8 (1.0)	40.2 (4.6)	47.0 (8.3)	53.1 (11.7)	52.0 (11.1)	45.3 (7.4)	35.9 (2.2)	28.1 (−2.2)	22.3 (−5.4)	36.3 (2.4)
Mean minimum °F (°C)	9.0 (−12.8)	11.5 (−11.4)	16.8 (−8.4)	22.4 (−5.3)	28.7 (−1.8)	34.3 (1.3)	43.5 (6.4)	42.4 (5.8)	32.5 (0.3)	23.6 (−4.7)	14.5 (−9.7)	8.1 (−13.3)	4.4 (−15.3)
Record low °F (°C)	−22 (−30)	−23 (−31)	−4 (−20)	10 (−12)	20 (−7)	25 (−4)	30 (−1)	31 (−1)	18 (−8)	12 (−11)	−1 (−18)	−22 (−30)	−23 (−31)
Average precipitation inches (mm)	2.44 (62)	2.31 (59)	1.67 (42)	0.49 (12)	0.82 (21)	0.37 (9.4)	0.21 (5.3)	0.11 (2.8)	0.24 (6.1)	0.97 (25)	1.49 (38)	1.90 (48)	13.02 (330.6)
Average snowfall inches (cm)	4.1 (10)	3.6 (9.1)	0.7 (1.8)	0.4 (1.0)	0.0 (0.0)	0.0 (0.0)	0.0 (0.0)	0.0 (0.0)	0.0 (0.0)	0.0 (0.0)	0.6 (1.5)	2.1 (5.3)	11.5 (28.7)
Average precipitation days (≥ 0.01 in)	5.8	4.9	4.6	3.9	3.4	2.0	0.9	0.5	1.0	2.1	3.9	5.7	38.7
Average snowy days (≥ 0.1 in)	1.5	1.5	0.4	0.2	0.0	0.0	0.0	0.0	0.0	0.0	0.5	1.2	5.3
Source 1: NOAA
Source 2: National Weather Service

== Demographics ==
Historical population
Census	Pop.	Note	%±
1890	882		—
1910	688		—
1920	918		33.4%
1930	1,358		47.9%
1940	1,575		16.0%
1950	5,338		238.9%
1960	5,598		4.9%
1970	6,608		18.0%
1980	6,520		−1.3%
1990	7,279		11.6%
2000	13,541		86.0%
2010	17,947		32.5%
2020	16,728		−6.8%
2024 (est.)	12,359	▼	−26.1%
U.S. Decennial Census

=== 2020 census ===
As of the 2020 census, Susanville had a population of 16,728. The population density was 2,112.7 inhabitants per square mile (815.7/km^{2}). The age distribution was 14.0% under the age of 18, 10.9% aged 18 to 24, 47.0% aged 25 to 44, 19.7% aged 45 to 64, and 8.5% aged 65 or older. The median age was 33.7 years. For every 100 females, there were 250.5 males, and for every 100 females age 18 and over, there were 298.3 males.

The census reported that 54.4% of the population lived in households, 0.2% lived in non-institutionalized group quarters, and 45.4% were institutionalized.

There were 3,841 households, of which 32.9% had children under the age of 18 living in them. Of all households, 38.0% were married-couple households, 9.6% were cohabiting couple households, 22.8% were households with a male householder and no spouse or partner present, and 29.6% were households with a female householder and no spouse or partner present. About 32.9% of all households were made up of individuals, and 13.0% had someone living alone who was 65 years of age or older. The average household size was 2.37. There were 2,281 families (59.4% of all households).

There were 4,277 housing units at an average density of 540.2 units per square mile (208.6 units/km^{2}). Of these, 3,841 (89.8%) were occupied, and 10.2% were vacant. Of occupied units, 50.1% were owner-occupied and 49.9% were occupied by renters. The homeowner vacancy rate was 3.4%, and the rental vacancy rate was 8.3%.

53.4% of residents lived in urban areas, while 46.6% lived in rural areas.

Racial composition as of the 2020 census
Race	Number	Percent
White	8,253	49.3%
Black or African American	1,937	11.6%
American Indian and Alaska Native	536	3.2%
Asian	325	1.9%
Native Hawaiian and Other Pacific Islander	257	1.5%
Some other race	4,271	25.5%
Two or more races	1,149	6.9%
Hispanic or Latino (of any race)	5,299	31.7%

=== 2023 ACS estimates ===
The median household income in 2023 was $57,607, and the per capita income was $20,764. About 12.9% of families and 16.9% of the population were below the poverty line.

=== 2010 census ===
At the 2010 census Susanville had a population of 17,947. The population density was 2,238.7 inhabitants per square mile (864.4/km^{2}). The racial makeup of Susanville was 11,269 (62.8%) White, 2,249 (12.5%) African American, 212 (1.2%) Native American, 198 (1.1%) Asian, 111 (0.6%) Pacific Islander, 2,928 (16.3%) from other races, and 580 (3.2%) from two or more races. There were 4,259 people (23.7%) of Hispanic or Latino ancestry.

The census reported that 9,439 people (52.6% of the population) lived in households, 108 (0.6%) lived in non-institutionalized group quarters, and 8,400 (46.8%) were institutionalized.

There were 3,833 households, 1,357 (35.4%) had children under the age of 18 living in them, 1,645 (42.9%) were opposite-sex married couples living together, 499 (13.0%) had a female householder with no husband present, 233 (6.1%) had a male householder with no wife present. There were 327 (8.5%) unmarried opposite-sex partnerships, and 16 (0.4%) same-sex married couples or partnerships. 1,161 households (30.3%) were one person and 405 (10.6%) had someone living alone who was 65 or older. The average household size was 2.46. There were 2,377 families (62.0% of households); the average family size was 3.05.

The age distribution was 2,559 people (14.3%) under the age of 18, 2,547 people (14.2%) aged 18 to 24, 7,633 people (42.5%) aged 25 to 44, 4,024 people (22.4%) aged 45 to 64, and 1,184 people (6.6%) who were 65 or older. The median age was 33.6 years. For every 100 females, there were 273.7 males. For every 100 females age 18 and over, there were 327.3 males.

== Government ==
United States presidential election results for Susanville, California
Year	Republican		Democratic		Third party(ies)	
Year	No.	%	No.	%	No.	%
2000	2,106	63.88%	1,029	31.21%	162	4.91%
2004	2,532	68.03%	1,139	30.60%	51	1.37%
2008	2,330	62.79%	1,291	34.79%	90	2.43%
2012	2,200	64.71%	1,089	32.03%	111	3.26%
2016	2,286	67.47%	865	25.53%	237	7.00%
2020	2,814	70.37%	1,092	27.31%	93	2.33%
2024	2,698	71.28%	972	25.68%	115	3.04%

=== Local government ===
The current city council members are:

Position	Name
Mayor	Mendy Schuster
Mayor Pro Tem	Russ Brown
City Councilor	Patrick Parrish
City Councilor	Curtis Bortle
City Councilor	Dawn Miller

=== List of mayors ===
This is a list of Susanville mayors by year.

- 1975 Jim Chapman
- 2016 Kathie Garnier
- 2018 Kevin Stafford
- 2020 Mendy Schuster
- 2022 Quincy McCourt
- 2024 Mendy Schuster

=== State and federal representation ===
In the California State Legislature, Susanville is in the 1st senatorial district, represented by Republican Megan Dahle, and the 1st Assembly district, represented by Republican Heather Hadwick.

In the United States House of Representatives, Susanville is in California's 1st congressional district, represented by Republican James Gallagher.

== Transportation ==
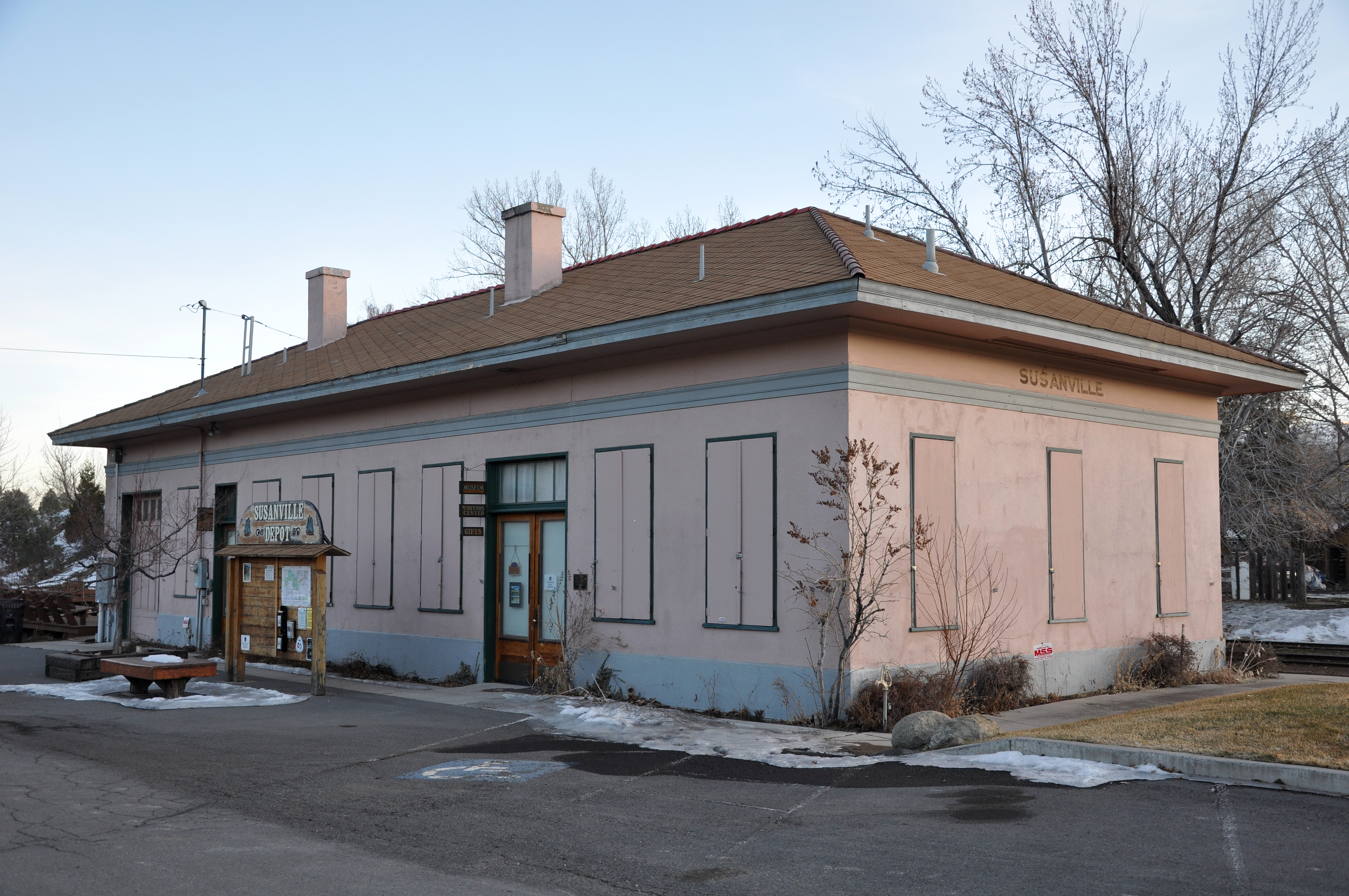
Susanville Railroad Depot, on the National Register of Historic Places, in 2013

Susanville lies at the junction of California State Routes 36 and 139. Highway 139 heads north to the Oregon border as a direct route to Klamath Falls. Highway 36 runs west to Red Bluff, and east to where it terminates with U.S. Route 395 just outside Susanville's city limits. U.S. 395 connects Alturas to the north and Reno to the south. California State Route 44 has its eastern terminus a short distance west of town, at an intersection with Highway 36. It runs west to Redding.

Susanville Municipal Airport, 5 miles (8 km) southeast of Susanville, serves as a public, general aviation airport. Lassen Rural Bus, operated by the Lassen County Transportation Commission, provides bus service within the city. Sage Stage, operated by Modoc County, connects Alturas, Susanville, and Reno, Nevada, with connections to Redding, California, and Klamath Falls, Oregon, as well as connections to/from Reno International Airport.

The Quincy Railroad stopped serving Susanville on the former Southern Pacific Railroad line in 2004. A Union Pacific Railroad caboose is on an intact section of track next to the rail depot.

== Economy ==
One California Department of Corrections and Rehabilitation facility, High Desert State Prison, is in Susanville.

=== Top employers ===
According to Susanville's 2014 Comprehensive Annual Financial Report, the top employers in the city are:

#	Employer	# of Employees
1	High Desert State Prison	1,250
2	Lassen County	441
3	Susanville Indian Rancheria	295
4	Lassen College	267
5	Banner Lassen Medical Center	197
6	Diamond Mountain Casino	179
7	Walmart	150
8	Susanville School District	101
9	Lassen Nursing & Rehabilitation Center	101
10	Lassen Union High School District	85
11	Northeastern Rural Health	81
12	Safeway	80
13	City of Susanville	62
14	Susanville Supermarket IGA	48

== Notable people ==
- Dugan Aguilar (1947–2018), Maidu/Achomawi/Northern Paiute photographer
- Hardin Barry, baseball player and lawyer, returned to practice law after a one-season career in professional baseball
- Frank Cady, actor (Petticoat Junction, Green Acres, and The Beverly Hillbillies).
- Aaron Duran, writer, media producer grew up in Susanville.
- Jack Ellena, former Los Angeles Rams player, born and raised in Susanville and ran a summer camp near town
- Mike Leach, former Texas Tech, Washington State, and Mississippi State head football coach was born in Susanville.
- Mitch Lively, former player for the San Francisco Giants, was born in Susanville
- Kevin Mangold, professional jockey, stunt double, actor, author
- Freddy Nagel, bandleader
- Ryan O'Callaghan, NFL player (Kansas City Chiefs, New England Patriots).
- Frank Shamrock, mixed martial artist
- Ken Shamrock, mixed martial artist and professional wrestler
- Helen Sharsmith taught at Lassen High School and Junior College for 3 years in the early 20th century.
- Mike Skinner, NASCAR driver
- Benjamin "Coach" Wade, reality television contestant
