= Cimarron Bell =

American serial killer

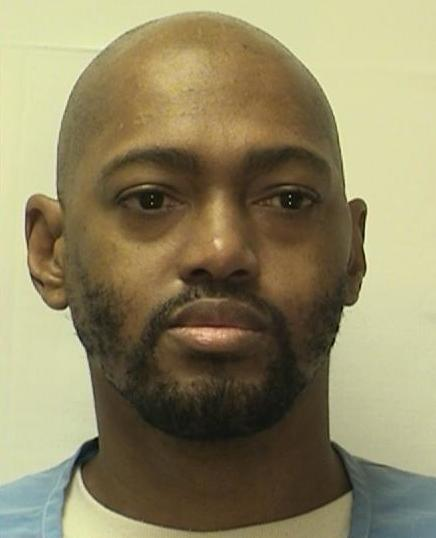
- Born: Cimarron Bernard Bell; April 7, 1974 (age 52); South Whittier, California, U.S.
- Conviction: First degree murder with special circumstances (4 counts)
- Penalty: Death

Details
- Victims: 4
- Span of crimes: 2003–2004
- Country: United States
- State: California
- Date apprehended: February 14, 2004
- Imprisoned at: California State Prison, Corcoran, Kings County, California

Cimarron Bernard Bell (born April 7, 1974) is an American serial killer who was convicted for the murders of his girlfriend and three men in California, committed during separate incidents in 2003 and 2004. Sentenced to death for the killings, he remains on death row awaiting execution.

== Murders ==
Around 2003, Bell, then working as a janitor at the Morgan Metals industrial park in La Habra, was involved in a check-cashing scheme involving several individuals, one of whom was his girlfriend, 22-year-old Ineka Edmondson. The operation eventually fell through, and one of the accomplices was arrested, leading Bell to believe that Edmondson had reported them to the police so only she could have access to the bank accounts and steal money from him. To get rid of her, he arranged a meeting with her at his workplace on November 11, 2003, where, after kissing her hello, he pulled out a gun and shot her three times in the head. Edmondson's body was found on the following day, but at the time, no conclusive evidence linked her boyfriend to the crime.

Not long after, Bell and a 21-year-old accomplice, Briaell Michael Lee, hatched a scheme to gather more money. This involved luring unsuspecting victims to the former's house in South Whittier, under the premises of selling them his modified Chevrolet Monte Carlo for a price of $8,500, which was substantially lower than what the car was worth. The first potential buyer was 23-year-old Mario Larios, who decided to go to the house in the company of his 25-year-old cousin, Mexican national Fernando Pina, as well as his 22-year-old friend Edgar Valles. On January 27, 2004, the trio were lured to Bell's house, where they were subsequently shot to death by both him and Lee. To hide the bodies, the two men shoved Larios and Valles inside the former's Mercedes-Benz, while Pina's body was locked in the car's trunk. Shortly afterward, Bell and Lee drove to a parking lot in La Mirada, where they abandoned the car and left. Later in the day, a curious passerby found the bodies after noticing a foul smell coming from the vehicle.

== Arrest, trial, and imprisonment ==
After the police were contacted, they started retracing the final steps of the victims, learning that on the day of their deaths, Larios and Valles, both of whom worked at the National Fence in Santa Fe Springs, were last seen leaving their workplace in the morning. Despite this, it was not until the arrest of another girlfriend of Bell during a credit card fraud scheme that led to their capture, as the woman informed police that he had told her that he had killed four people and had even taken her to see where he had shot Edmondson. Bell was held on $1 million bail, while Lee was held without bail on murder charges.

Subsequently, the District Attorney's Office announced their intention to seek death sentences against both defendants for the aggravated circumstances, as well as for Bell's murder of Edmondson. Bell and Lee each pleaded not guilty to the triple murder charges.

After a several months-long trial, the jury found Bell guilty of all four murders, at which point his defense attorney filed a motion for a new trial. This request was rejected, and on April 19, 2011, Bell was officially sentenced to death for the murders, with the verdict welcomed by the victims' family members. Since his incarceration, he has repeatedly attempted to appeal his sentence, but so far, his attempts have been unsuccessful, and he remains on death row.

Lee was only convicted of one count of second-degree murder, being acquitted of the other charges. The lesser conviction spared him from execution, and he was sentenced to 40 years to life in prison. Over the following years, Lee's attorneys attempted to have his convictions overturned, arguing that there were procedural errors in their client's trial. These claims were rejected by the District Court of Appeal, which upheld his convictions in 2014.

== See also ==
- Capital punishment in California
- List of death row inmates in the United States § California
- List of serial killers in the United States
