= California Substance Abuse Treatment Facility and State Prison, Corcoran =

Male-only state prison in California, US

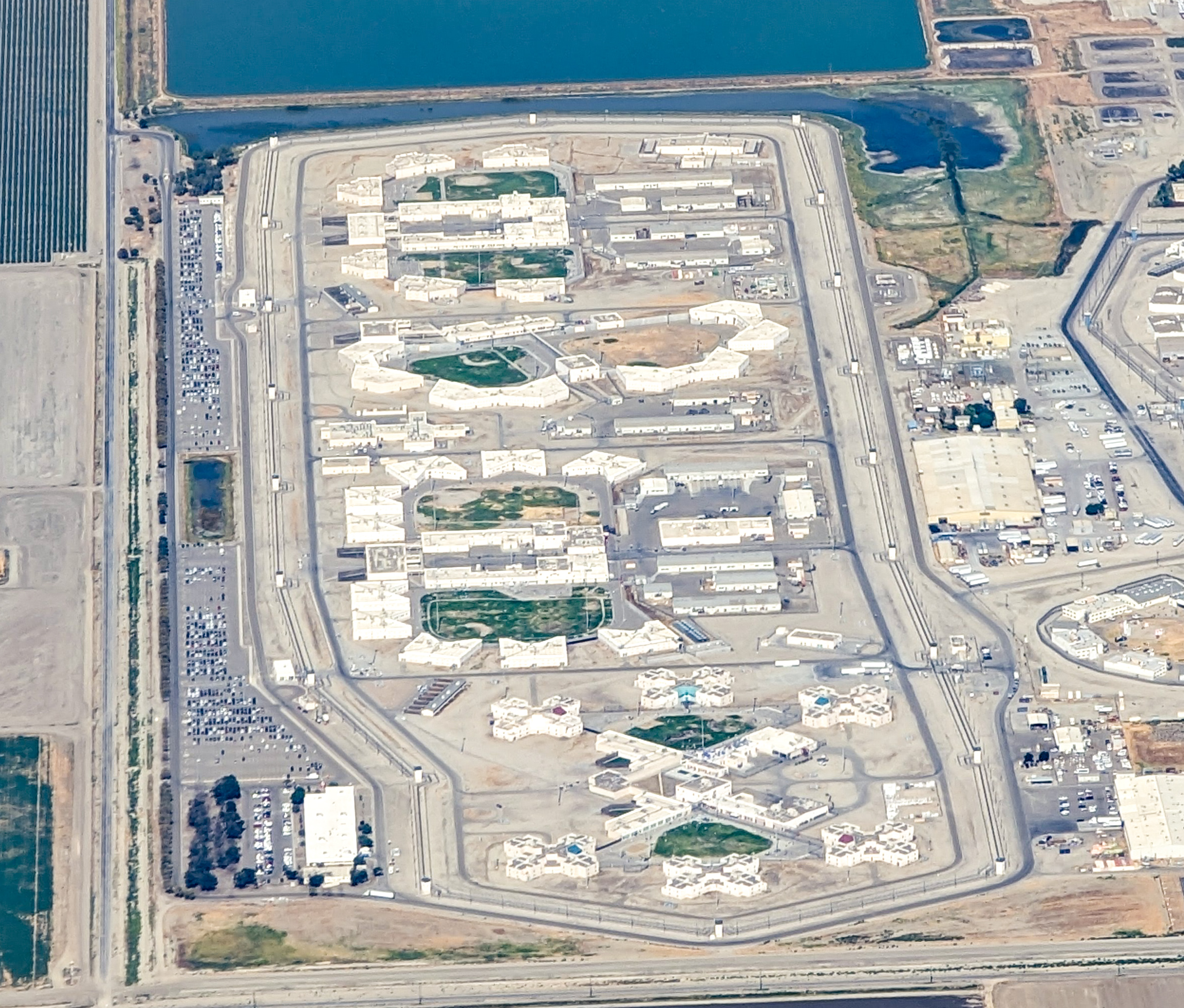
- A view of the state treatment hospital
- Interactive map of California Substance Abuse Treatment Facility and State Prison, Corcoran
- Location: Corcoran, California; 36.053°N 119.549°W
- Status: Operational
- Security class: Medium-maximum
- Capacity: 3,424
- Population: 4,650 (135.8%) (January 31, 2023)
- Opened: August 1997
- Managed by: California Department of Corrections and Rehabilitation

California Substance Abuse Treatment Facility and State Prison, Corcoran (SATF) is a male-only state prison located in the city of Corcoran, in Kings County, California, It is sometimes referred to as California Substance Abuse Treatment Facility, and New Corcoran.

== Facilities ==
As of fiscal year 2005–2006, SATF had a total of 1,786 staff and an annual operating budget of $230 million. As of September 2007, it had a design capacity of 3,424 but a total institution population of 7,459, for an occupancy rate of 217.8 percent.

As of July 31, 2022, SATF was incarcerating people at 134.4% of its design capacity, with 4,603 occupants.

SATF's 280 acres (110 ha) include the following facilities, among others:

- Level II housing ("Open dormitories with secure perimeter fences").
- Level III housing ("Individual cells, fenced perimeters and armed coverage").
- Level IV housing ("Cells, fenced or walled perimeters, electronic security, more staff and armed officers both inside and outside the institution").

SATF's most well-known program involves "two self-contained treatment facilities (739 beds each)... [which] were specifically designed to provide housing and residential substance abuse treatment for minimum security offenders with substance abuse problems." The program uses a "therapeutic community" model which had produced low recidivism rates at Richard J. Donovan Correctional Facility at Rock Mountain and California Institution for Women, and which had also been used at California Rehabilitation Center. In the program, inmates "undergo at least 20 hours a week of individual and group substance abuse counseling, addiction education, relapse prevention, living skills workshops, anger management, conflict resolution, and even a class called 'identification and change of criminal thought processes'." SATF has been described as "the largest addiction treatment center in the world."

== History ==
Having been "authorized by legislation approved in 1993," SATF opened in August 1997.

The California Office of the Inspector General issued a January 2003 report on health care at SATF that "suggest[ed] three inmate deaths in the previous two years could be attributed in part to negligent medical treatment." Per a newspaper article on the report before its public release, the problems at SATF "ranged from lax oversight that has led to the wasting of millions of taxpayer dollars to full-time doctors who see only a handful of patients and continually sleep on the job." The report was publicly released only in March 2004, and is available only in a version "heavily redacted" by lawyers of the administration of Governor Arnold Schwarzenegger.

In February 2007, the California Office of the Inspector General concluded "Numerous studies show that despite an annual cost of $36 million, the Department of Corrections and Rehabilitation’s in-prison substance abuse treatment programs [such as those at SATF] have little or no impact on recidivism." The report characterized the cumulative amount spent by the California Department of Corrections and Rehabilitation on substance abuse programs for inmates and parolees as "a $1 billion failure — failure to provide an environment that would allow the programs to work; failure to provide an effective treatment model; failure to ensure that the best contractors are chosen to do the job at the lowest possible price; failure to oversee the contractors to make sure they provide the services they agree to provide; failure to exert the fiscal controls necessary to protect public funds; failure to learn from and correct mistakes—and most tragically, failure to help California inmates change their lives and, in so doing, make our streets safer." In response, the Schwarzenegger administration reorganized the California Department of Corrections and Rehabilitation and named a new head of its Division of Addiction and Recovery Services.

== Notable inmates ==
The prison's notable inmates include:

=== Current ===
Inmate Name	Register Number	Status	Details
Wilson Chouest	B90861	Serving a life sentence.	While already in prison for other crimes, was convicted for the murder of two people, one of them being Shirley Soosay.
Colton Simpson	F94793	Serving a 126-year sentence.	Former Crips member who was convicted on charges of robbery after describing his crimes in a book.

- Efren Saldivar – Convicted angel of death serial killer.
- William Suff- Serial Killer known as the Riverside Prostitute Killer. Sentenced to death for murdering 12 women in Riverside County. Transferred to SATF/SP from San Quentin State Prison due to the abolishment of death row.
- Scott Pettigrew- Sentenced to 25 years to life for the murder of Anita "Mimie" Cowen. Case was featured on the Netflix series Worst Roommate Ever.

=== Former ===
- Robert Downey Jr. – Actor who entered SATF in August 1999 to serve a three-year sentence for a "parole violation that stemmed from a 1996 drug conviction." In August 2000, he was released early "on orders from the 2nd District Court of Appeal in Los Angeles" because he had received credit for "time served on related misdemeanor charges and for time already served in drug rehabilitation programs."
- Phil Spector – Music producer convicted of murder in 2009 and serving 19 years to life; transferred to Corcoran in mid-2009. Died in 2021
- Gregory Matthews Miley – Accomplice of serial killer William Bonin; later transferred to and died at Mule Creek State Prison.
- Scott Evans Dekraai – 2011 Seal Beach shooter. Currently located at California Correctional Institution.
- Cameron Hooker – Convicted for the sexual assault and kidnapping of Colleen Stan (also known as "the girl in the box"). Hooker was sentenced to 104 years' imprisonment for holding Stan as his "sex slave", his parole was denied in 2015, but a hearing was held in September 2021 to decide if he should be classified as a Sexually Violent Predator, which resulted in his civil commitment to a state hospital.
