= Prison Town, USA =

- Directed by: Katie Galloway; Po Kutchins
- Written by: Katie Galloway; Po Kutchins
- Produced by: Katie Galloway; Po Kutchins
- Cinematography: Ben Kutchins; Evan Eames
- Edited by: Beth Segal
- Music by: JJ McGeehan
- Distributed by: Docurama
- Release date: April 15, 2007 (Ashland International Film Festival)
- Running time: 87 minutes
- Country: United States
- Language: English

Prison Town, USA is a 2007 documentary film about Susanville, California, a small, rural town in the northeastern part of the state that tries to resuscitate its economy by accepting construction of a state prison. The economy had formerly depended on agriculture, mining and timber, but since the late 20th century has been increasingly dependent on prisons.

The city now has two state prisons and a federal prison has opened nearby in Herlong, also in Lassen County. Half of the adults in Susanville work in these facilities, and 11,000 people are incarcerated in the rural county.

The film follows four men, their families, and how they react to the new institution: Lonnie Tyler, a prisoner; Dawayne Brasher and Gabe Jones, guards; and Mike O'Kelly, a dairyman threatened by how the prison could affect the community's buy-local policy.

Prison Town, USA was written, produced, and directed by Katie Galloway and Po Kutchins. It was aired in 2007 as part of the POV series on PBS.
