= Federal Correctional Institution, Herlong =

Medium-security prison in California, US

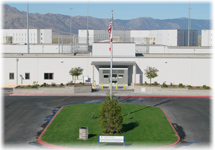
- Interactive map of Federal Correctional Institution, Herlong
- Location: Lassen County, near Herlong, California; 40.150°N 120.168°W
- Status: Operational
- Security class: Medium-security (with minimum-security prison camp)
- Population: 1,640 (145 in prison camp)
- Opened: 2005
- Managed by: Federal Bureau of Prisons

The Federal Correctional Institution, Herlong (FCI Herlong) is a medium-security United States federal prison for male inmates in California, opened in 2007. It is operated by the Federal Bureau of Prisons, a division of the United States Department of Justice. The facility also includes a satellite prison camp that houses minimum-security male offenders.

FCI Herlong is located in Lassen County, in northeastern California near the Nevada border, approximately 60 miles northwest of Reno, Nevada, and 190 miles northeast of Sacramento, California, the state capital. It is one of three prisons in the county; the other two are state prisons located in the county seat of Susanville. In 2007 half the adults in Susanville worked in one of the three facilities; together the three prisons hold approximately 11,000 inmates. Prisons are the major employers in the area since the timber industry declined.

== Notable incidents ==
In 2009, a joint investigation conducted by the Bureau of Prisons, the FBI and the IRS uncovered a scheme in which three inmates at FCI Herlong: Scott Whitney, Diego Paucar and Erik Alexander, filled out false tax returns for other inmates seeking refunds. In order to portray the inmates as taxpayers, they made false W-2 forms using the names of real employers, but none of the inmates had actually worked for them. The IRS discovered the scheme and no refunds were actually paid. If the scheme had been successful, the three co-conspirators would have obtained $93,950 from the IRS. Whitney, Paucar and Alexander subsequently pleaded guilty to conspiring to defraud the IRS and had seven, four, and three years added to their original sentences, respectively.

== Notable inmates (current and former) ==
Inmate Name	Register Number	Photo	Status	Details
Tre Arrow	70936-065		Released in 2009 after serving 5 years in Canada and the United States.	Member of the ecoterrorist group Earth Liberation Front and a former FBI Ten Most Wanted fugitive; pleaded guilty to arson in 2008 for setting fire to cement trucks and logging trucks in Oregon in 2001.
Tim DeChristopher	16156-081		Released from custody in April 2013; served a 2-year sentence.	Co-founder of the environmental group Peaceful Uprising; convicted in 2012 of false representation for registering for a 2008 federal land auction and bidding on land worth $1.8 million in order to prevent it from being used for oil and gas exploration.
Tyler Barriss	29381-031		Serving a 20 year sentence; scheduled for release in 2035.	Caller during a swatting incident that resulted in the fatal shooting of Andrew Finch, an uninvolved third party.
Christopher "B.G." Dorsey	31969-034		Released on September 5, 2023.	Better known by his stage name B.G. (acronym for Baby Gangsta), is an American rapper from New Orleans, Louisiana. On July 18, 2012, B.G. was sentenced to 14 years in a federal prison for gun possession and witness tampering.
TJ Cox	16598-510		Serving a 1 year sentence; scheduled for release in 2027.	Former U.S. representative for California's 21st congressional district; later pleaded guilty to fraud charges.

== See also ==
- List of U.S. federal prisons
- Federal Bureau of Prisons
- Incarceration in the United States
