= California Men's Colony =

American male-only state prison

California Men's Colony (CMC)
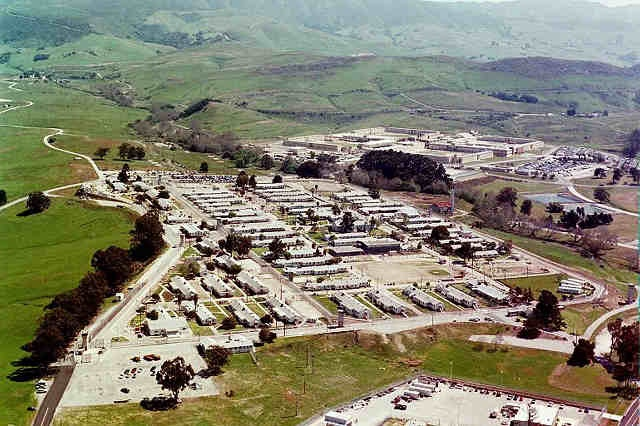
- Interactive map of California Men's Colony (CMC)
- Location: San Luis Obispo County, near San Luis Obispo, California; 35.325°N 120.698°W
- Status: Operational
- Security class: Minimum to medium (With Maximum on Override)
- Capacity: 3,816
- Population: 3,254 (85.3% capacity) (January 31, 2023)
- Opened: 1954
- Managed by: California Department of Corrections and Rehabilitation
- Warden: Nathan Gaughan

California Men's Colony (CMC) is an American male-only state prison located northwest of the city of San Luis Obispo in unincorporated San Luis Obispo County, California, along the central California coast approximately halfway between Los Angeles and San Francisco.

== Facilities ==
CMC has two separate facilities on its 356 acres (144 ha): East and West. The minimum-security West facility includes Level I open dormitories. The medium-security east facility has level II and level III with individual cells, fenced perimeters and armed coverage, with housing divided into four quadrangles, as well as a licensed hospital and mental health delivery system.

As of Fiscal Year 2006/2007, CMC had a total of 1,870 staff and an annual operating budget of $151 million.

As of January 31, 2023, CMC had an inmate population of 3,254, or 85.3% of its design capacity.

== Programs ==
CMC has been called a "country club" and "garden spot" among California prisons because of its wide variety of vocational, educational and psychological-treatment programs. Notable CMC programs include:

- Arts in Corrections, "designed to rehabilitate inmates through art".
- A "Level I camp program for fire suppression, conservation and other community service work." The jobs include "trash pickup and removal" at Port San Luis Harbor District properties, including Avila Beach.
- Central Coast Adult School, which "aims to reduce the recidivism rate and help inmates rejoin the work force".
- Prison Industry Authority, which "manufactures and ships millions of dollars of prison-made products annually".
- Prisoners Against Child Abuse, which "donates more than $100,000 a year to local children's organizations".
- Narcotics Anonymous.
- Alcoholics Anonymous.

== History ==
The West Facility opened in 1954 and the East Facility opened in 1961. Three female former CMC workers won a 1998 settlement for $4.3 million as a result of a sexual harassment lawsuit, which was "the largest such settlement ever for the Department of Corrections." A San Luis Obispo County grand jury produced a 2005 report observing that "while old and overcrowded, CMC was well maintained." The West facility is slated for closure.

== Notable inmates ==
- Joseph Naso, Convicted serial killer sentenced to death for the murders of four women. Spent brief time here before being transferred to the California Healthcare Facility due to the abolishment of death row.
- Rodney Alcala, Serial killer known as the Dating Game Killer. Served time here in 1974–1977 for selling marijuana to a minor and violating parole. Paroled in 1977.
- Bobby Beausoleil, convicted murderer associated with the Manson Family (though convicted of a crime pre-dating the Tate/LaBianca murders), was incarcerated at CMC during the 1990s. His wife, Barbara, lived nearby for years.
- Lawrence Bittaker and Roy Norris, serial killers known as "the Tool Box Killers", met at CMC in 1978, before they committed their crime spree.
- Christian Brando, son of actor Marlon Brando, convicted in 1991 for the killing of his half-sister's boyfriend and released in 1996 after serving half of a 10-year sentence
- Bruce McGregor Davis, convicted Manson Family murderer serving two life sentences for his parts in two Manson Family murders.
- Richard Allen Davis was paroled from CMC in June 1993 "after serving half of a 16-year sentence" for kidnapping.
- Tracy Lamar Davis, better known by his rapper name Big Tray Deee, was convicted for attempted murder in 2005 for firing at rival gang members. He was sentenced to twelve years in prison but was released after nine years on April 3, 2014.
- John Timothy Earnest, perpetrator of the Poway synagogue shooting where he murdered one and injured three.
- Jim Gordon, drummer for Derek and the Dominos, convicted in 1983 for the murder of his mother
- Thomas Henderson, NFL football linebacker, incarcerated in CMC between 1984 and October 1986 "for sexually assaulting two teenage girls and then trying to bribe them not to testify against him."
- Maulana Karenga, founder of Kwanzaa, was incarcerated in 1971 after being convicted of felony violence against a woman victim who testified he tortured her.
- Charles Keating Jr., key figure in the S&L crisis, convicted in 1992 to serve a 12^{1}/_{2} year sentence for fraud, racketeering and conspiracy. Released in 1996, when his state and federal convictions were overturned.
- Suge Knight, rap music producer, was incarcerated at CMC beginning in February 1997 but was later transferred to Mule Creek State Prison.
- Timothy Leary, psychologist known for his support of psychedelic therapy, was imprisoned at CMC after being sentenced in March 1970 for possession of marijuana, but escaped from the West facility in September 1970 with the assistance of the Weatherman organization. He had been placed in "the least security-rated institution in the state" because "he did not 'represent either violence potential or serious escape risk'." After spending time with Eldridge Cleaver in Algeria and attempting to "gain political asylum" in Switzerland, Leary was arrested in Afghanistan in January 1973. After being convicted of "escape from a minimum security prison," he was sent to California Medical Facility.
- Danny Masterson, actor best known for his work on the sitcom That '70s Show (1998–2006), is currently incarcerated at CMC as of February 2024 after being convicted of rape. Masterson was sentenced to 30 years to life in prison, which means he might be eligible for parole after serving 25½ years. His lawyers have said they will appeal the conviction.
- Richard Allen Minsky, convicted serial rapist.
- Demetrius "Hook" Mitchell was at CMC between 2000 and 2004. Much of the film documentary Hooked: The Legend of Demetrius "Hook" Mitchell was filmed while Hook was at CMC.
- Herbert Mullin, serial killer, "spent nearly 20 years" at CMC "before being transferred to Mule Creek in 1993."
- Huey P. Newton, founder of the Black Panther Party, was at CMC between 1968 and 1970. He was confined to his cell because he refused to work.
- Craig Peyer, former police officer convicted for the murder of Cara Knott while on duty. His next parole hearing will be in 2027.
- Mark Rogowski, former professional skateboarder, pleaded guilty on March 20, 1991 to the murder (first-degree) and rape of Jessica Bergsten.
- Lawrence Singleton in 1987 "earned an early release [from CMC] through a work program and good behavior" after having served 8 years of a 14-year sentence for the rape and mutilation of Mary Vincent.
- Edgar Smith, now at High Desert State Prison (California), had a parole hearing in March 2007.
- Ike Turner served 18 months of a four-year sentence at CMC between March 1990 and September 1991 for cocaine possession offenses.
- Charles "Tex" Watson, convicted Manson Family murderer, was at CMC between the early 1970s and 1993, where he "married and fathered three children during conjugal visits" and "began operating a nonprofit Christian ministry that distributed audio tapes and solicited donations." He was then transferred to the medium-security Mule Creek State Prison. A spokesman for the prison stated that the move was "part of the routine shuffling of inmates around the state"; however, others said that it was related to pressure from the family of Sharon Tate, recommendations of the state Board of Prison Terms, and the actions of a state senator.
- Jean-Pierre Wehry was arrested in the 2006 Riverside, California To Catch a Predator sting. He received the longest sentence in To Catch a Predator history (75 years to life) due to California's three-strikes law and remains incarcerated. In 2017, he released an autobiography titled In For Life: Confessions of a Three-Strikes Prisoner under the pen name Damien Lartigue.
- Rapper Tory Lanez was transferred to CMC in May 2025 after being stabbed at California Correctional Institution earlier that month. Lanez was sentenced to 10 years imprisonment for the 2020 shooting of Megan Thee Stallion.

== See also ==
- List of California state prisons
