= Born to Kill? =

- Genre: True crime documentary
- No. of series: 7
- No. of episodes: 54

Production
- Running time: 45 mins (each episode)
- Production company: Twofour

Original release
- Network: Sky One (2005–2011); Channel 5 (2012–2016)
- Release: October 13, 2005 – September 7, 2016

Born to Kill? is a British true crime television series, made by Twofour Productions. Each episode is an in-depth look at the childhood, and formative years of serial killers in an attempt to find out whether the individuals were born killers, or created by the environments they found themselves in.

A book to accompany the series, How to Make a Serial Killer: The Twisted Development of Innocent Children, has been written by Christopher Berry-Dee and Steven Morris.

In 2013 TwoFour Productions sold the fifth series of Born to Kill? in Canada, the United States and Latin America.

In the show there were regular participants criminal psychologists/experts, like: Louis Schlesinger, Helen Morrison, Katherine Ramsland, David Wilson and Robert Ressler.

== Episodes ==
=== Series 1 ===
- S01E01 Fred West
- S01E02 Harold Shipman
- S01E03 Jeffrey Dahmer
- S01E04 Myra Hindley
- S01E05 The Washington Snipers
- S01E06 Ivan Milat

=== Series 2 ===
- S02E01 Ted Bundy
- S02E02 Charles Starkweather
- S02E03 John Wayne Gacy
- S02E04 Aileen Wuornos
- S02E05 Richard Chase
- S02E06 Albert DeSalvo

=== Series 3 ===
- S03E01 Gary Ridgway
- S03E02 Edmund Kemper
- S03E03 Richard Ramirez
- S03E04 Donald Henry Gaskins
- S03E05 David Berkowitz
- S03E06 Dennis Nilsen

=== Series 4 ===
- S04E01 Charles Manson
- S04E02 Dennis Rader
- S04E03 Beverly Allitt
- S04E04 Hillside Stranglers (Kenneth Bianchi and Angelo Buono)
- S04E05 Colin Ireland
- S04E06 Herbert Mullin

=== Series 5 ===
- S05E01 Peter Sutcliffe
- S05E02 Donald Nielson
- S05E03 Patrick Mackay
- S05E04 John Linley Frazier
- S05E05 Cary Stayner
- S05E06 The Briley Brothers
- S05E07 Hadden Clark
- S05E08 Paul Bernardo and Karla Homolka
- S05E09 Thor Christiansen
- S05E10 Dale Hausner and Samuel Dieteman
- S05E11 Wesley Shermantine and Loren Herzog
- S05E12 Douglas Clark and Carol Bundy

=== Series 6 ===
- SE06E01 Robert Napper
- SE06E02 John Duffy and David Mulcahy
- SE06E03 Gerald and Charlene Gallego
- SE06E04 Levi Bellfield
- SE06E05 Tony Costa
- SE06E06 Richard Cottingham
- SE06E07 Cleophus Prince Jr.
- SE06E08 Sean Gillis
- SE06E09 Timothy Wilson Spencer
- SE06E10 David Alan Gore and Fred Waterfield
- SE06E11 David Carpenter
- SE06E12 Bobby Joe Long

=== Series 7 ===
- SE07E01 Peter Moore
- SE07E02 Trevor Hardy
- SE07E03 William Suff
- SE07E04 Charles Albright
- SE07E05 Allan Legere
- SE07E06 Robert Reldan

== Born to Kill? Class of Evil ==
The series received a sequel in 2017. As usual, one new killer is investigated in each episode, but this series delved into the extensive 'Born To Kill?' archive, to draw comparisons with some of the most infamous serial killers in history. The new series lasted only one season.

=== Series 1 ===
- SE01E01 Peter Tobin
- SE01E02 Altemio Sanchez
- SE01E03 Alton Coleman and Debra Brown
- SE01E04 Stephen Griffiths
- SE01E05 Graham Young
- SE01E06 Joanna Dennehy

== Killing Spree ==
In 2014 TwoFour Productions started a new show named Killing Spree with the same crew and narrator. The show followed the same pattern as Born to Kill? by looking at their childhood and the police investigation after them. The only difference that they examine cases of spree and rampage killers rather than serial killers. The show lasted two seasons.

=== Series 1 ===
- SE01E01 Suffolk Strangler
- SE01E02 Terror in Paradise
- SE01E03 Northumbria Rampage
- SE01E04 The Miami Murders
- SE01E05 Horror at the Mall
- SE01E06 Columbine Massacre

=== Series 2 ===
- SE02E01 The Hungerford Massacre
- SE02E02 Soho Nail Bomber
- SE02E03 New York Knifings
- SE02E04 Revenge Cop Killer
- SE02E05 The Family Slayer
- SE02E06 Woman On The Rampage

== Related programs ==
- Crime Investigation Australia
- Crimes That Shook the World
- Most Evil Killers
