= John Linley Frazier =

American mass murderer

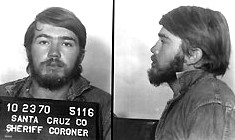
- Born: January 26, 1946; Hayward, California, U.S.
- Died: August 13, 2009 (aged 63); Mule Creek State Prison, Ione, California, U.S.
- Cause of death: Suicide by hanging
- Other name: The Killer Prophet
- Conviction: First degree murder (5 counts)
- Penalty: Death; commuted to life imprisonment

Details
- Country: United States
- State: California
- Location: Santa Cruz
- Killed: 5
- Weapon: .38 Smith & Wesson revolver
- Imprisoned at: October 23, 1970

John Linley Frazier (January 26, 1946 – August 13, 2009), also known as The Killer Prophet, was an American mass murderer who killed five people in Santa Cruz County, California. He was the first of three men who would embark on killing sprees in Santa Cruz County in the 1970s; he was followed by Herbert Mullin and Edmund Kemper.

== Biography ==
John Linley Frazier was born on January 26, 1946, to Patricia Irene (née Adams) and William B. Frazier.

After his mother remarried to Santa Cruz resident Pierre Pascal, Frazier attended elementary and middle school in Capitola, followed by Santa Cruz High School, where he dropped out in 1961 as a freshman. Frazier's "first brush" with the juvenile justice system was at age 15, and he was held in police custody again some years later. Following a car accident in the late 1960s, he had become a religious fanatic who obsessively studied the Bible. He believed the voice of God was telling him to commit homicides in order to prevent the environment from being destroyed by rich men like Victor Ohta. God, Frazier told friends, had chosen him to save the environment.

== Murders ==
=== Background ===
The murders took place a little over a year after the Tate–LaBianca murders by Manson Family members in Los Angeles as well as the Zodiac Killer murders in San Francisco.

Frazier had convinced himself that he was the John referred to in the New Testament’s Book of Revelation, and efforts by his wife and mother to get Frazier to seek therapy were unsuccessful. A week before the murders, he told his wife that "some materialists might have to die" for him to fulfill his destiny.

=== Day of the murders ===
On October 19, 1970, Frazier entered the home of wealthy ophthalmologist Victor Ohta in the oceanfront resort area of Soquel, a few miles south of Santa Cruz. Perched atop a hilltop overlooking Monterey Bay, the mansion had been designed by a disciple of Frank Lloyd Wright. Frazier proceeded to murder Ohta, his wife, their two sons, and Ohta's medical secretary. He shot the five of them with a .38 caliber revolver and pushed their bodies into the home's swimming pool.

After the killings, Frazier typed a note on a typewriter owned by Ohta, which he left on the window of Ohta's Rolls-Royce. The note read:

Halloween, 1970. Today World War III will begin, as brought to you by the People of the Free Universe. From this day forward, anyone and/or everyone or company of persons who misuses the natural environment or destroys same will suffer the penalty of death by the People of the Free Universe. I and my comrades from this day forth will fight until death or freedom against anyone who does not support natural life on this planet. Materialism must die, or Mankind will stop.

KNIGHT OF WANDS KNIGHT OF CUPS Night(sic) OF PENTACLES KNIGHT OF SWORDS

He set fire to the home and blocked the roads to the property with the doctor’s car and the secretary’s car. Frazier fled in Virginia Ohta’s station wagon, which he later abandoned and burned in a railroad tunnel.

=== Arrest ===
Neighbors informed police that they had seen Frazier patrolling Soquel, California, armed with a gun. The firearm, a .38 caliber revolver, was believed to have been used in the slayings. There were also reports of Frazier being seen driving the Ohtas' missing station wagon.

Two sheriff's deputies, Bradley Arbsland and Rodney Sanford, went into the woods and found the cabin reported to be where Frazier lived. Upon entering the cabin they found it to be empty but noticed signs of recent activity. The two deputies staked out the vicinity of the cabin for 20 hours, hiding in some nearby brush. The next morning, October 23, at 7:30 A.M., the two deputies captured Frazier while he slept. He was captured four days after murdering the Ohta family.

== Trial and aftermath ==
The jury found Frazier to be legally sane, and he was tried and convicted of five counts of murder.

On the trial's first day, Frazier appeared in court with a new look representing the two sides of a hippie. One side had long hair and a long beard and the other side was totally bald with no beard, hair or eyebrow. He later shaved his head completely on advice from his attorney. Frazier was sentenced to death on November 29, 1971. However, in 1972 the death penalty statute was ruled unconstitutional in California and his sentence was commuted to life imprisonment.

The Ohta family's two daughters, 18-year-old Taura and 15-year-old Lark, were away at boarding school during the murders. However, Taura died by suicide seven years afterwards.

== Death ==
On August 13, 2009, aged 63, Frazier hanged himself in Mule Creek State Prison in Ione, California.

== See also ==
- Charles Manson
- Edmund Kemper
- Herbert Mullin

== In popular culture ==
=== Literature ===
- Ward Damio: Urge to Kill. Pinnacle Books, 1974, ISBN 0-523-00380-3.
- David Everitt: Human Monsters. Contemporary Books, New York 1993 ISBN 9780809239948
- Donald T. Lunde: Murder and Madness. San Francisco Book Co., San Francisco, CA 1976 ISBN 9780913374320

=== Music ===
- Doom Metal band Church of Misery, released a track in 2013 called "All Hollow's Eve" about Frazier on their album, Thy Kingdom Scum

=== Television ===
- The case was the subject of a 2014 episode of British tv series Born to Kill?
- The case was the subject of a 2017 episode of Investigation Discovery's series A Crime to Remember (Season 4 Episode 7, "Killer Prophet")
