= Kemper: The CoEd Killer =

- Directed by: Rick Bitzelberger
- Written by: Jack Perez
- Produced by: Jamie Elliott; Ralph E. Portillo
- Starring: Christopher Stapleton; Robert Sisko
- Cinematography: Hank Baumert, Jr.
- Edited by: Ron McRae
- Music by: Geoff Levin
- Release date: November 25, 2008 (United States)
- Running time: 88 minutes
- Country: United States
- Language: English

Kemper: The CoEd Killer is a 2008 American direct-to-video horror film directed by Rick Bitzelberger, and written by Jack Perez. The film is loosely based on the murders committed by California serial killer Edmund Kemper.

== Plot ==
In Santa Cruz, the police department is under pressure to solve a series of murders which appear to be the work of two independent serial killers. To help with the cases, Detective Tom Harris turns to his best friend, Edmund Kemper, a genius, but psychopathic, house painter who lives with his abusive mother, and who had previously helped Harris capture another criminal named John Linley Frazier. Together, Ed and Tom decipher a message sent by one of the killers, who they discover taking pictures at the latest crime scene while they are staking it out. During the ensuing confrontation, the delusional man, Herbert McCormack, opens fire on the two, but is shot to death by Tom. Upon returning home after the encounter with McCormack, Ed bludgeons his mother with a hammer, and kills a female hitchhiker he had taken captive, revealing that he is the second killer.

While inspecting the abandoned pool where the hitchhiker's body was dumped, Tom receives a call from Ed, who reveals his involvement in the girl's death. While rushing to the Kemper residence, Tom gets another call from Ed, who instructs him to go into the kitchen, where Tom discovers Mrs. Kemper's vocal cords in the garbage disposal, and her severed head pinned to the wall with several darts protruding from it. Ed is eventually traced to a motel, but manages to escape, wounding an officer in the process. This, coupled with his past association with Ed coming to light, results in Tom being suspended from the force by the mayor, though he is quickly placed back on duty when Ed abducts a woman named Brandi, and threatens to kill her and one other person a day if Tom is not rehired.

As the investigation continues (with Ed shooting his grandparents at a young age coming to light, and a number of his previous victims being found in his backyard) a weary Ed ultimately allows the police to trace him to an abandoned hospital, where the mutilated Brandi is rescued. When Tom finds him wandering the building, Ed tells him that he was born there, and that his mother viewed him as nothing more than a burden forced upon her, a toxin spawned from the poisoned seed of a man who did not even bother to stick around. After apologizing for everything he has done, Ed tries to commit suicide, but is wounded by a sniper, and arrested. The film ends with Tom visiting Ed on death row.

== Cast ==
- Christopher Stapleton - Detective Tom Harris
- Robert Sisko - Edmund Kemper
- Sean Thomas - Detective Bill Ross
- Jordan Blanchard - Young Edward Kemper
- Andy E. Horne - Herbert McCormack
- Zarah Mahler - Peggy Marshall
- Samantha Colburn - Alice Samuels
- Robin DeMarco - Carol Harris
- Ken Weiss - Mayor Al Turner
- Patricia Place - Alma Kemper
- Kate Danson - Annie
- Paul Speckman - Officer Phil
- Nancy Harding - Josie Murrow
- Zoe Canner - Brandi (Goth Girl)
- Missy Hairston - Margaret

== Reception ==
A negative review was given by Concise Cinema, which criticized every aspect of the film, and gave the closing statement, "It isn't the worst serial killer film I've seen but it is probably the dullest." Bums Corner opened its review with, "You'd expect a film called Kemper to be really dark and grim, and possibly hard to watch, but this loosely fact-based tale plays more like an episode of some really low-budget made-for-cable cop show. It's not as bad as it could've been, but nowhere near as good as it should've been" and went on to criticize the acting (though Robert Sisko's performance was deemed "interesting") and script and direction, though admitted they had some "moments of inspiration".

Critical Condition lambasted the film as "lazy" for transplanting Kemper's story to the present day, and making it almost "totally fictitious". The site gave the closing statement, "It's not as bad as the recent Ulli Lommel serial killer crap, but not as professional-looking as the recent Michael Feifer stuff. As a straight-ahead thriller, it is just simply awful and contains some of the worst police procedurals I've ever seen in a movie. Any episode of CSI (take your choice of Las Vegas, Miami or New York) contains more depth, gore and excitement. Stay away from this one."

A lukewarm score of four out of ten was given by Home Theater Info, which stated "The film is entertaining if your expectations are not too high". Horror Movie a Day found Kemper frustratingly inaccurate and uninteresting, and the characters dull and "stupid".

The World According to Dave (which gave a grade of six out of ten) said Kemper was not "too bad" and "Some of the acting isn't spectacular here and a film closer to the facts would have been better but as general viewing I could name many films that are vastly inferior to this."
