= Investigation Discovery =

American television channel dedicated to true crime

- Country: United States
- Broadcast area: Nationwide
- Headquarters: New York City, U.S.

Programming
- Picture format: 1080p HDTV

Ownership
- Owner: Discovery, Inc. (1996–2022); Warner Bros. Discovery (2022−2026); Skydance Corporation (2026−present)
- Parent: Skydance TV
- Sister channels: list of assets owned by Skydance

History
- Launched: October 7, 1996; 30 years ago
- Former names: Time Traveler (prelaunch, 1994–1996); Discovery Civilization Network; (1996–1998); Discovery Civilization Channel; (1998–2003); Discovery Times; (2003–2008)

Links
- Website: investigationdiscovery.com

Availability

Streaming media
- Affiliated Streaming Service: HBO Max/Discovery+
- Service(s): Philo, YouTube TV, DirecTV Stream, Vidgo, Sling TV, Hulu + Live TV

Investigation Discovery (ID) is an American cable television network. Owned by Skydance Corporation, ID primarily broadcasts true crime programming, including documentaries and anthology series.

The channel was established in 1996 as Discovery Civilization Network (later Discovery Civilization Channel), which focused on world history. In 2002, the channel was relaunched as Discovery Times as a joint venture with The New York Times Company, with a focus on programming related to the culture of the United States. The Times divested their stake to Discovery in 2006, and the channel took its current name and format two years later.

As of November 2023, ID is available to approximately 69 million pay television households in the United States-down from its 2015 peak of 86 million households.

== History ==
=== 20th century ===
The channel launched in 1996 under the name Discovery Civilization Network: The World History and Geography Channel. It was one of four digital cable companion networks; Discovery Travel & Living Network (now Destination America), Discovery Science Network (now Science Channel) and Discovery Kids (now Discovery Family, which has been a joint venture with Hasbro since 2010) were rolled out by Discovery Communications simultaneously in October 1996. Plans for the channel had surfaced in November 1994, when its working name was Time Traveler.

=== 21st century ===
In April 2002, The New York Times Company and Discovery Communications announced a joint venture to run the Discovery Civilization Channel. By then, it was available in 14 million households. The partnership aimed to complement the historical shows, with programming about current events and contemporary history. On March 25, 2003, the channel was rebranded as Discovery Times, focusing more on the culture of the United States, as well as other miscellaneous programming. The previous name was described as "a little off-message" by executives.

In April 2006, The New York Times sold its stake in Discovery Times back to Discovery Communications, ending its ownership in the channel. Despite the sale of the Times stake in the channel, the "Times" was kept in the name until January 27, 2008 when the network was rebranded as Investigation Discovery (ID), shifting its programming focus on true crime documentaries.

In 2016, owing to a growth in popularity in true crime among the demographic, ID was the second-highest-rated cable network among women 25–54. In 2018, ID was the sixth-highest-rated basic cable network in full-day viewership.

On April 12, 2020, Investigation Discovery introduced a new logo, placing a greater focus on the "ID" initialism to make it better-suited for multi-platform use.

In December 2022, the team responsible for ID also took over responsibility for HLN, which became a sibling channel following the merger of Discovery, Inc. with WarnerMedia to form Warner Bros. Discovery earlier that year. That channel had gradually shifted to a similar true crime-focused format since the mid-2010s after having primarily been a rolling news sister channel to CNN, dropping its last original news programs at the same time as the management change, and had already begun airing repeats of ID programming such as Hometown Homicide shortly after the WBD merger.

== Programming ==
Most of ID's programs are original productions, but it also airs re-titled off-network reruns, including ABC's 20/20, CBS' 48 Hours, and NBC’s Dateline.

ID's longest-running series is On the Case with Paula Zahn which debuted in 2009. Other long-running shows on the network include Disappeared and Homicide Hunter: Lt. Joe Kenda.

On June 7, 2015, ID aired its first ever scripted mini-series; Serial Thriller: Angel of Decay chronicled the investigation of convicted (and later executed) serial killer Ted Bundy. A second installment, Serial Thriller: The Chameleon, premiered as a two-part miniseries in December 2015, chronicling the crimes that resulted in the execution of American serial killer Stephen Morin. A third installment, Serial Thriller: The Headhunter, about serial killer Edmund Kemper (which possibly includes the story of serial killer Herbert Mullin), premiered on February 20, 2016.

== International versions ==
- Canada (Rogers Media-operated; since January 1, 2025)
- Europe
- Latin America
- India (Asia Pacific) (Closed on February 1, 2018, relaunched on January 13, 2020)
- Australia and New Zealand
- France (as Discovery Investigation)
- Italy
- South Africa
- Vietnam (2005–2007)

=== Former ===
- Russia (closed on March 9, 2022)
- Canada (Bell Media-operated; formerly Court TV Canada; relaunched as Oxygen on January 1, 2025)
