= Richard Allen Minsky =

American criminal

- Born: March 15, 1944 (age 82); Danvers, Massachusetts
- Other names: The Con Artist Rapist, Dennis, Paul Davidson, Kenneth Miller, Robert Miller, Richard Alan Minsky
- Occupation: Used car salesman
- Status: Serving life sentence at California Men's Colony in San Luis Obispo, California
- Convictions: Rape, assault, battery, extortion, grand theft, indecent assault, larceny, lewd and lascivious behavior, oral copulation, sexual assault, sexual battery, sodomy, escape
- Penalty: 146 years to life imprisonment

Richard Allen Minsky (born March 15, 1944), also known as Richard Alan Minsky, is an American former used car salesman who was convicted of multiple charges of rape, assault, battery, extortion, grand theft, larceny, lewd and lascivious behavior, oral copulation, sexual assault, sexual battery, sodomy, and escape. He was charged over 80 times and convicted in more than a dozen trials over a series of scams committed in the states of California, Florida, Georgia, Massachusetts, and Pennsylvania.

A registered sex offender, Minsky was featured on the television shows America's Most Wanted and Fox Files several times in 1999 and arrested in Tampa, Florida on September 15 of that year. After extradition to California, Minsky was sentenced to 146 years to life in prison by the Superior Court of Los Angeles County on November 30, 2001.

== Background ==
Richard Allen Minsky was born in Danvers, Massachusetts in 1944. He was a used car salesman who lived in the nearby towns of Brookline and Winthrop. According to police, his hobbies included smoking, gambling and betting on horse races.

== Sex scam ==
Los Angeles Police Department detective John Metcalf first investigated Minsky in 1982 for the same M.O. involving 4 victims. Metcalf again ran across Minsky in 1998, after his release from a 2-year sentence in Massachusetts. According to Metcalf's testimony, Minsky preyed on women randomly selected from a phone book. He was able to imitate voices of various people to aid in the deception. Minsky would start cold calls by whispering at a barely audible level until the victim called out a name, giving him the information needed to continue the ruse. He would then pose as an attorney to convince them that the aforementioned loved one was in legal trouble. In variations of the scam, he would say that the loved one was involved in a hit and run accident that carried a mandatory two-year sentence. He would tell the victim that a witness would have to be bribed with sex or money in order to drop charges so that their loved one would be released from jail. Minsky met with the women as the so-called witness at various locations such as hotels, and sexually assaulted some of them. In some of the cases, he urged the victim to dress provocatively for the meeting. In the 1982 cases Minsky was difficult to prosecute because there was no weapon or threat of bodily injury.

== Arrests and incarceration ==
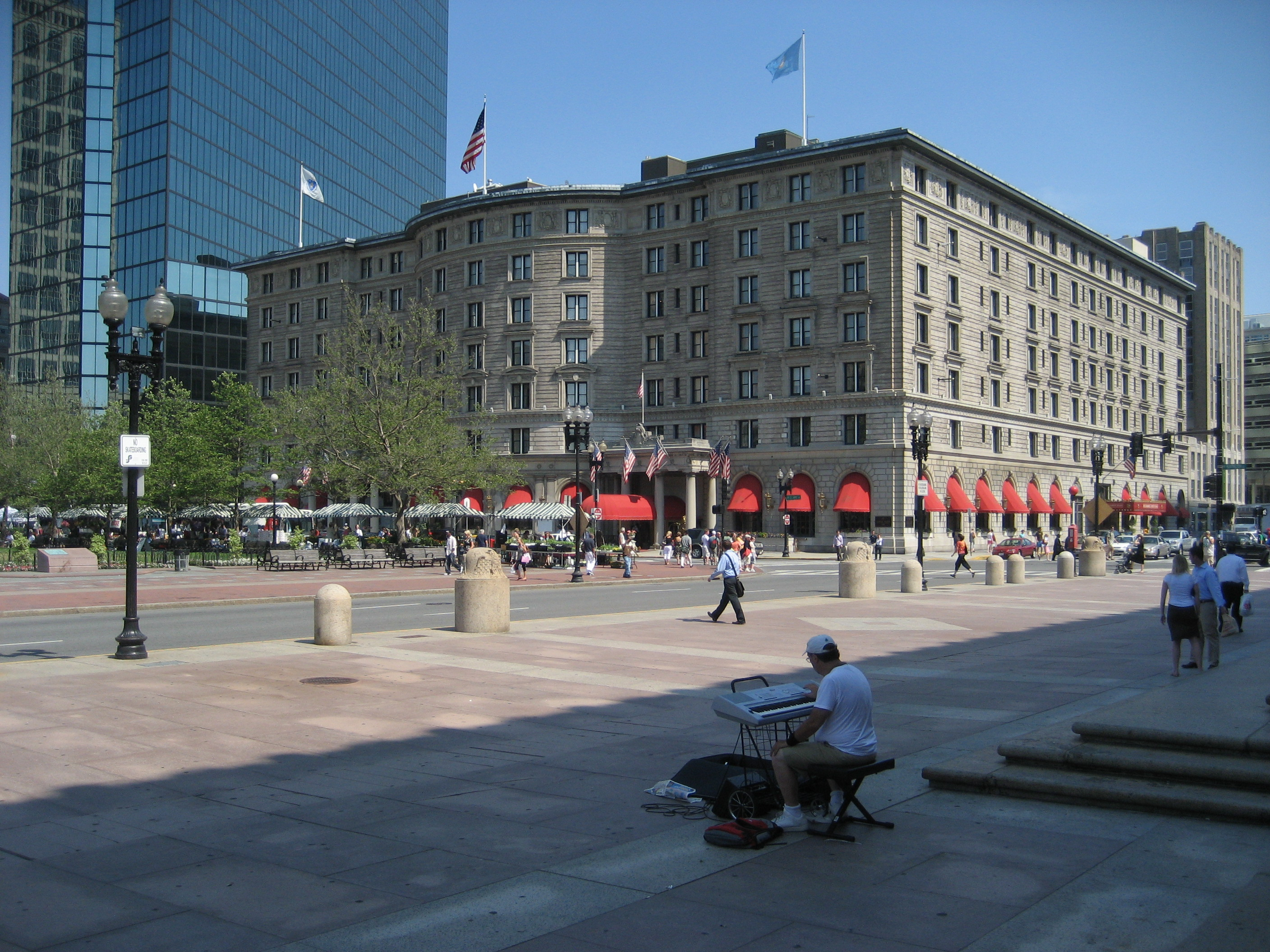
Copley Plaza, where Boston Police arrested Minsky after observing him calling women randomly from a payphone.

Metcalf eventually counted hundreds of victims across California, Florida, Georgia, Massachusetts, North Carolina, Pennsylvania, Virginia, and Washington. Because of Minsky's arrests in 1983, in Georgia and conviction of sodomy, sexual assault, and extortion in Georgia and Florida, Metcalf's arrest warrant was recalled in the interest of justice. In January 1985, Minsky pleaded no contest in a trial for the September 1982 rape of a Fort Lauderdale woman. In exchange for the plea bargain, Assistant Florida State Attorney John Jolly dropped related charges of extortion and grand theft. Broward County Circuit Judge Patti Henning sentenced Minsky to fifteen years in prison for the rape, of which he served about 11 years including time served.

In 1994, Minsky posed as a lawyer named Dennis to lure a woman from the town of Haverhill, Massachusetts to Plum Island with information supposedly exposing an extramarital affair her husband was having. After he brought the victim to the island, he beat her with a plank and raped her. Minsky was interviewed by Detective Metcalf, during Minsky's extradition to California on their charges, regarding his involvement in the Plum Island rape. Minsky denied any involvement and local authorities declined to prosecute based partially on the victim's previous false police reports, according to local authorities. On December 7, 1996, Minsky was arrested in Boston, Massachusetts and charged with three counts each of attempted extortion and assault, and one count of failing to register as a sex offender. Minsky was wrapped in a windbreaker to hide his identity during a court hearing where his bail was set at $13,000. Boston Police detective William Hartford stated that Minsky spent over 90 minutes at a payphone with a bag of dimes at the Copley Plaza Hotel, randomly calling women from the Boston and Cambridge phone books. Minsky told the women that he was holding their friends or family hostage and demanded sex as ransom. One of the women called contacted the police from her car phone. He was convicted of indecent assault and battery. He was released from a Massachusetts Correctional Institution in June 1998, but again failed to register as a sex offender and skipped probation. Within two weeks, Minsky struck again in Los Angeles and was sought for parole violations in connection with crimes against eleven women in Southern California and stealing approximately $50,000. Metcalf sought help in finding Minsky by profiling him on Fox Files in April and June 1999. According to Metcalf, during this time Minsky shared photos of two of his puppies with an acquaintance by mail. In the background of photo of the puppies were a newspaper and the apartment building of Minsky's residence. Cindy Smith, a producer with America's Most Wanted, recognized the newspaper as from Raleigh-Durham, North Carolina. Copies of the photos containing the picture of the apartment building, believed to be Minsky's residence, were sent to the Raleigh-Durham Police Department and there an officer recognized it as an apartment he had lived at. Officers responding to the location discovered that Minsky had abandoned the unit after America's Most Wanted had profiled him again on July 31. When officers arrived, they discovered he had left behind his belongings and puppies and the television was still turned to the station that showed America's Most Wanted.

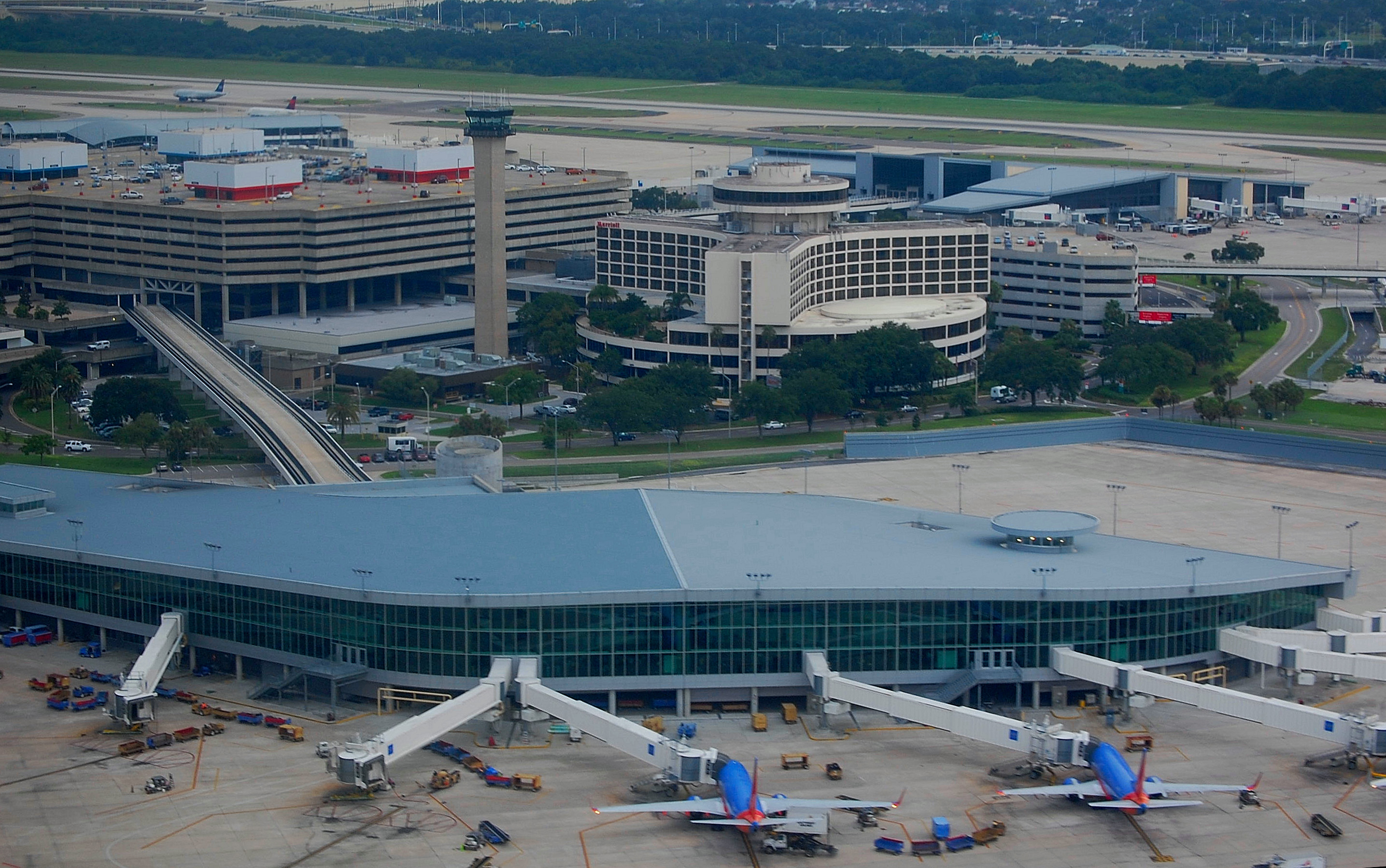
Minsky was arrested at a Tampa International Airport terminal during his final scam attempt in 1999.

On September 15, 1999, at 9:50 p.m., Minsky was arrested at Tampa International Airport by airport police officers. Minsky attempted to scam another woman the previous day by asking her to bring $5,000 to the airport. His bail was set at $1 million and he was extradited to California. During an interview with America's Most Wanted, Minsky, when asked if he had any remorse for his crimes, stated, "Of course I do now that I'm caught, but what am I supposed to do; I'm a parolee. Work for $10 an hour?" At Minsky's trial the segment containing his statement was played for the jury, sealing his fate.

=== Life sentence ===
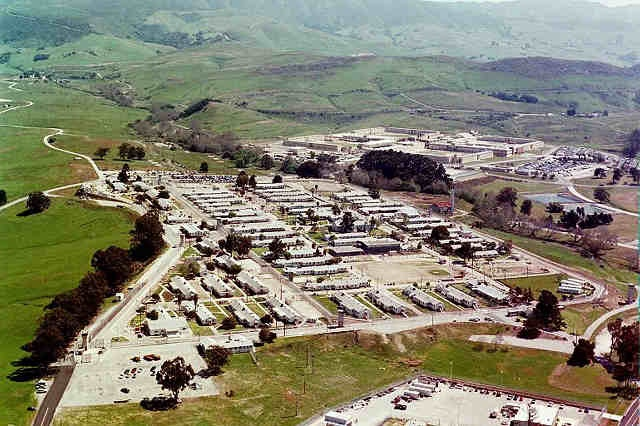
Minsky is serving a life sentence at California Men's Colony in San Luis Obispo.

On March 29, 2001, the Superior Court of Los Angeles County charged Minsky with offenses committed against eight women between June and October 1998. Deputy District Attorney Linda Loftfield said that Minsky committed "one of the cruelest crimes that anyone could contemplate." Minsky's defense attorneys argued that his actions may have been morally wrong, but that he broke no law. In October 2000, the jury convicted Minsky of multiple charges of rape, oral copulation, and grand theft. On November 30, 2001, he was sentenced to 146 years to life in prison by Superior Court Judge Marsha N. Revel, who stated: "Thankfully, there aren't many Mr. Minskys in the world; this is just pure evilness and sadisticness." Eight of Minsky's victims were present in the courtroom and applauded or wept when the sentence was announced.

Minsky appealed the verdict in 2003, but the 2nd District Court of the California Courts of Appeal rejected Minsky's argument that the threat of jail time used in his scam did not meet the definition of duress required in a rape conviction. Minsky was assigned inmate number T39189 and is incarcerated at California Men's Colony in San Luis Obispo.

== See also ==
- Impostor
- Spanish Prisoner
