= Survivors Guide to Prison =

- Theatrical release poster
- Directed by: Matthew Cooke
- Written by: Matthew Cooke
- Produced by: Christina Arquette; David Arquette; Gina Belafonte; Matthew Cooke; Steve De Vore; Evan Ferrante; Robin C. Garvick; Adrian Grenier; Christina McDowell; Bryn Mooser; Susan Sarandon
- Cinematography: Matthew Cooke; Steve Minor
- Edited by: Matthew Cooke
- Music by: Sebastian Robertson
- Production company: Saturday Entertainment
- Distributed by: Gravitas Ventures
- Release date: 23 February 2018 (United States)
- Running time: 102 minutes
- Country: United States
- Language: English

Survivors Guide to Prison is a 2018 documentary film directed by Matthew Cooke exploring the United States prison system, largely through the lens of two wrongly convicted men, Reggie Cole and Bruce Lisker. The film, narrated by Cooke and Susan Sarandon, focuses on problems one might face against the prison system via segments covering topics such as plea bargains, solitary confinement, and the difficulties of life after prison. The movie features interviews with former prison inmates, police officers, court officials, lawyers, and journalists, as well as many appearances by celebrities such as Danny Glover, B-Real, Macklemore, Deepak Chopra, RZA, Busta Rhymes, Q-Tip, Quincy Jones, Tom Morello, Wayne Kramer, Ice-T, and Danny Trejo. Some of the celebrities interviewed are themselves former prison inmates. The film was executive produced by Adrian Grenier and Susan Sarandon.

== Production ==
The film was partly crowdfunded, raising nearly $29,000 via an Indiegogo campaign. Organizations such as the ACLU and the Innocence Project also were involved with production.

== Release ==
Survivors Guide to Prison premiered on February 20, 2018, at The Landmark in Los Angeles. The film was subsequently released in theaters and on streaming platforms on February 23, 2018.

== Reception ==
On review aggregator Rotten Tomatoes, the film holds an approval rating of 100%, based on 14 reviews with an average rating of 7.9/10. Metacritic gives the film a weighted average score of 66 out of 100, based on 5 critics, indicating "generally favorable reviews".

Critics generally praised the film, especially its subject matter and statistics, with Joe Leydon at Variety calling it "surprisingly potent." For the LA Weekly, Paul Rogers spoke of the movie's "impassioned interviews" and "harrowing" score, while Simon Abrams at the Village Voice criticized its "eclectic group of celebrity experts", calling it overall "messy but compelling". The Los Angeles Times' Michael Rechtshaffen also compared it to Ava DuVernay's documentary 13th.
