= Louis Schlesinger =

American psychologist

- Born: August 19, 1949 (age 77)
- Occupation: Professor of Psychology
- Awards: NJPA Psychologist of the Year Karl F. Heiser Presidential Award Distinguished Researcher Award

Academic background
- Education: New School of Social Research

Academic work
- Discipline: Psychologist
- Institutions: John Jay College of Criminal Justice at the City University of New York (CUNY)

Louis Schlesinger is a Professor of Psychology at John Jay College of Criminal Justice at the City University of New York (CUNY). Schlesinger's areas of research focus on Forensic Psychology; focusing on extraordinary crimes including but not limited to serial and non-serial murder, rape, homicide, mass murder, and crime scene behavior. Schlesinger has written numerous books and journal articles. He has also participated in a number of podcasts, documentaries, and TV shows to discuss his work. Across his career, Schlesinger has been the recipient of the New Jersey Psychological Association Psychologist of the Year award, the Karl F. Heiser Presidential Award, and the Distinguished Researcher Award.

== Career ==
Louis Schlesinger received his PhD in 1975 through The New School of Social Research in New York. He began working with sex offenders at the New Jersey State Forensic Facility for adult services and treatment after being appointed as a member and eventual chair member of the Special Classification Review Board. In 2001, Schlesinger served as a member of a Senate Task Force that re-wrote Megan's Law. Currently, Schlesinger is a Professor of Psychology at John Jay College of Criminal Justice at the City University of New York (CUNY) and is working with the Federal Bureau of Investigation's (FBI) Behavioral Analysis Unit (BAU) in a joint research project to study sexual and serial murder.

== Research ==
Schlesinger's research focuses on extraordinary crimes; actions considered to be violations of human rights such as terrorism, sexual abuse, rape, and corruption. Schlesinger's research focuses on extraordinary crimes; crimes that involve a "gross violation of human rights, corruption, terrorism, or child sexual abuse offenses" His research dives into the psychological, behavioral, and forensic aspects of the afore mentioned crimes, as he examines the underlying motivations, personality traits, and psychopathologies of offenders. Schlesinger is currently working with the Federal Bureau of Investigation's (FBI) Behavioral Analysis Unit (BAU) to study such crimes.

He has published numerous articles and books on such topics over the years including his most recent publications Sexual Assault/Rape and Serial Sexual Homicide: Clinical and Investigative Considerations (2024). and Serial Offending (2022). Some of Schlesinger's most notable publications focus on sexual homicide and deviance, offender profiling and crime scene behavior, psychopathy and personality disorders in violent offenders, and serial killer's behavioral patterns.

Schlesinger has distinguished the concept of catathymic crisis from that of compulsive murder.

== Awards and accolades ==
- 1990 - NJPA Psychologist of the Year (New Jersey Psychological Association)
- 1993 - Karl F. Heiser Presidential Award (American Psychological Association)
- 1996 - Distinguished Researcher Award (New Jersey Psychological Association)

== Documentary and film ==
The most notable documentary and film appearance that Schlesinger has appeared in was through Born to Kill?. Schlesinger provides expert psychological opinion and insight into serial killers and their behaviors. He seeks to explain criminal behavior, analysis of crime scenes, and the use of psychological profiling in solving such cases.

The following is a list of documentaries and films Schlesinger has appeared and/or been featured in:

- Born to Kill?
- The Killer Speaks?
- Most Evil Killers
- Very Scary People
- Psycho: The Lost Tapes of Ed Gein
- Born to Kill? Class of Evil

== Publications ==
=== Books ===
- Schlesinger, Louis B., ed. (2022). Serial Offenders
- Revitch, E.; Schlesinger, L.B., ed., (2017). Psychiatric Aspects of Criminal Behavior: The Collected Papers of Eugene Revitch.
- Schlesinger, Louis B., ed. (2007). Explorations in Criminal Psychopathology: Clinical Syndromes With Forensic Implications
- Schlesinger, L.B. (2004). Sexual Murder: Catathymic and Compulsive Homicides.
- Revitch, E.; Schlesinger, Louis B. (1989). Sex Murder and Sex Aggression: Phenomenology, Psychopathology, Psychodynamics and Prognosis
- Schlesinger, L.B. (1983). Sexual Dynamics of Anti-Social Behavior
