= Cave dwellers (Washington, D.C.) =

In 20th century Washington, D.C. society, "cave dwellers" were the elite families who had lived in and enjoyed influence in Washington for many generations. Most traced their ancestry to the families that established Washington or nearby communities, such as Georgetown and Alexandria.

Cave dwellers were typically unconcerned with or actively disinterested in the comings and going of politicians, and chiefly concerned themselves with quiet assistance to charities, private clubs such as the Chevy Chase Club, Cosmos Club, Metropolitan Club, and with other exclusive activities. Families associated with the cave dweller milieu include Beall, Belin, Claggett, Glover, Grosvenor, Leiter, Peter, Randolph, Riggs, Taft and Willard. Many of these names are attached to local places. Shared ties to a small set of schools are also prominent. Many have attended the Madeira School, Sidwell Friends School, Holton-Arms School, St. Albans School or Landon School.

The term dates to about the turn of the 20th century, and was discussed as early as 1902. Its use had started to decline by the 1950s.

== In literature ==
The Cave Dwellers, a 2020 novel by Christina McDowell, is a fictional portrayal of cave dweller life in the early 21st century.
