= Hans W. Maier =

German-Swiss psychiatrist (1882–1945)

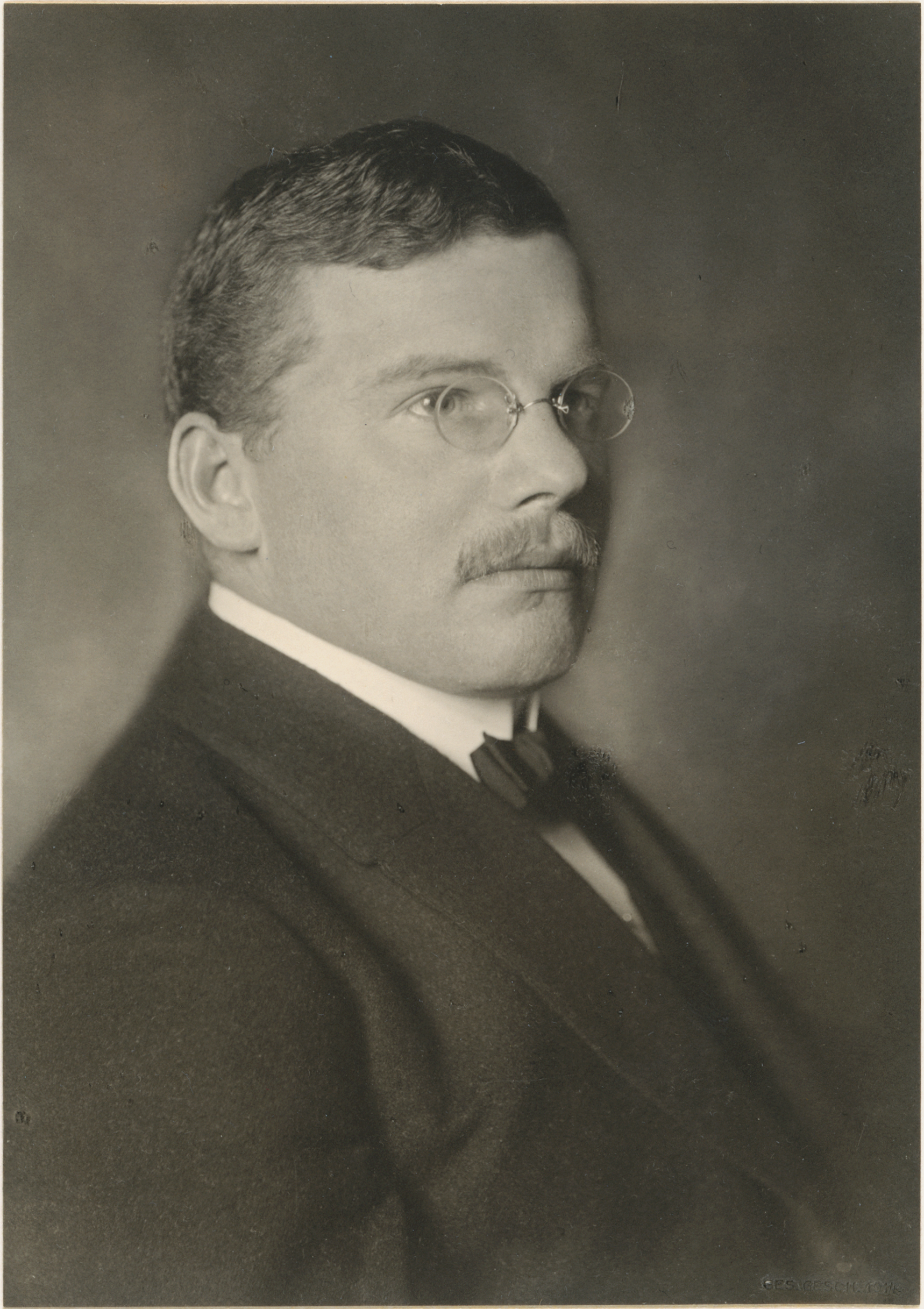
- Hans W. Maier, 1914
- Born: July 26, 1882; Frankfurt am Main, Kingdom of Prussia, German Empire
- Died: March 25, 1945 (aged 62); Zurich, Canton of Zurich, Switzerland
- Education: University of Zurich
- Occupation: Psychiatrist
- Spouse(s): Leonie Laissle (until 1909); Elena Schauffele (from 1919 onwards)

Hans Wolfgang Maier (26 July 1882 – 25 March 1945) was a German-Swiss psychiatrist and a worldwide known specialist of cocaine addiction (Kalant JO. Maier’s Cocaine Addiction (Der Kokainismus). Addiction Research Foundation, Toronto, 1987). His dissertatio,n under the direction of Eugen Bleuler, was on the topic of "moral idiocy". i.e. about the question whether there could be an inherited moral defect underlying criminality (Maier HW. Über moralische Idiotie. J. Psychol. Neurol. 13, 1908).

In 1912, he introduced the term catathymic crisis in his paper "Über katathyme Wahnbildung und Paranoia".

== Biography ==
Maier was the son of Jewish parents, the banker, pacifist and ethicist Gustav Maier and Regina Friedlaende). His parents' conversion to the Reformed Church in 1893 also affected him ., although the family had escaped from antisemitism in Germany and was not religious (www.themaierannerfiles.ch).

Maier was naturalized in Zurich in 1900. He completed his secondary education in Zurich and studied medicine at the Universities of Zurich, Vienna, and Strasbourg. He received his doctorate in Zurich in 1905 and subsequently worked as an assistant and attending physician at the Burghölzli Psychiatric Clinic. In 1912, he qualified as a university lecturer in psychiatry and was appointed to a full professorship in 1916. He founded and directed the Psychiatric Polyclinic and the Stephansburg Children's Psychiatric Ward. In 1927, Maier succeeded Eugen Bleuler as director of the Burghölzli and became a full professor of psychiatry at the University of Zurich.

Around 1940, during a paternity suit, it came to light that he had maintained a relationship for years with a volunteer entrusted to his care at Burghölzli and who claimed that he had fathered a child with her in 1939. Maier demanded disciplinary proceedings against himself, which were opened in January 1941. In June 1941, the investigating commission exonerated Maier to the extent that it denied criminal responsibility and rejected disciplinary measures, but noted that confidence in him had been shaken. Maier then resigned immediately. Even during the disciplinary proceedings, the lawyer Karl Scherrer had stirred up sentiment against Maier. In 1942, he launched a nationwide smear campaign by publishing a pamphlet entitled "The Case of Prof. Dr. Hans W. Maier" on behalf of an anonymous "action committee." An antisemitic motive likely played a role here. Maier sued Scherrer for defamation and was successful; in 1944 the further distribution of the pamphlet was banned. Note that at the same clinic the young physician Carl Gustav Jung had an intimate relationship with a young patient withour any consequences.

Maier was involved in drafting the Swiss Penal Code of 1942. He authored numerous works on social psychiatry, forensic psychiatry, and psychiatry and the military, and was also active as an expert witness. Maier reformed the medical corps in the Swiss military.

Like his two predecessors, Maier espoused eugenic ideas. Together with Alfred Glaus and Hans Binder, he standardized the "Zurich practice" of marriage prohibition, abortion regulations, sterilization and castration already established by his predecessors, which had an impact far beyond the Burghölzli.

He was buried in the Rehalp Cemetery in Zurich.

== Personal life ==
His first wife, Leonie Laissle, disappeared under mysterious circumstances in 1915, leaving Maier a single father. In 1919, he married Elena Schauffele (1889–1969). One son was the psychiatrist Gerhard Maier (1910–1988), who was married to Emmi Meierhofer (1911–1992). She was a sister of Marie Meierhofer. Maier's granddaughter, the natural scientist Beatrice Maier Anner (born 1942), has published numerous books about her family history.
