= Bruce Lisker =

American wrongfully convicted of murder

Bruce E. Lisker
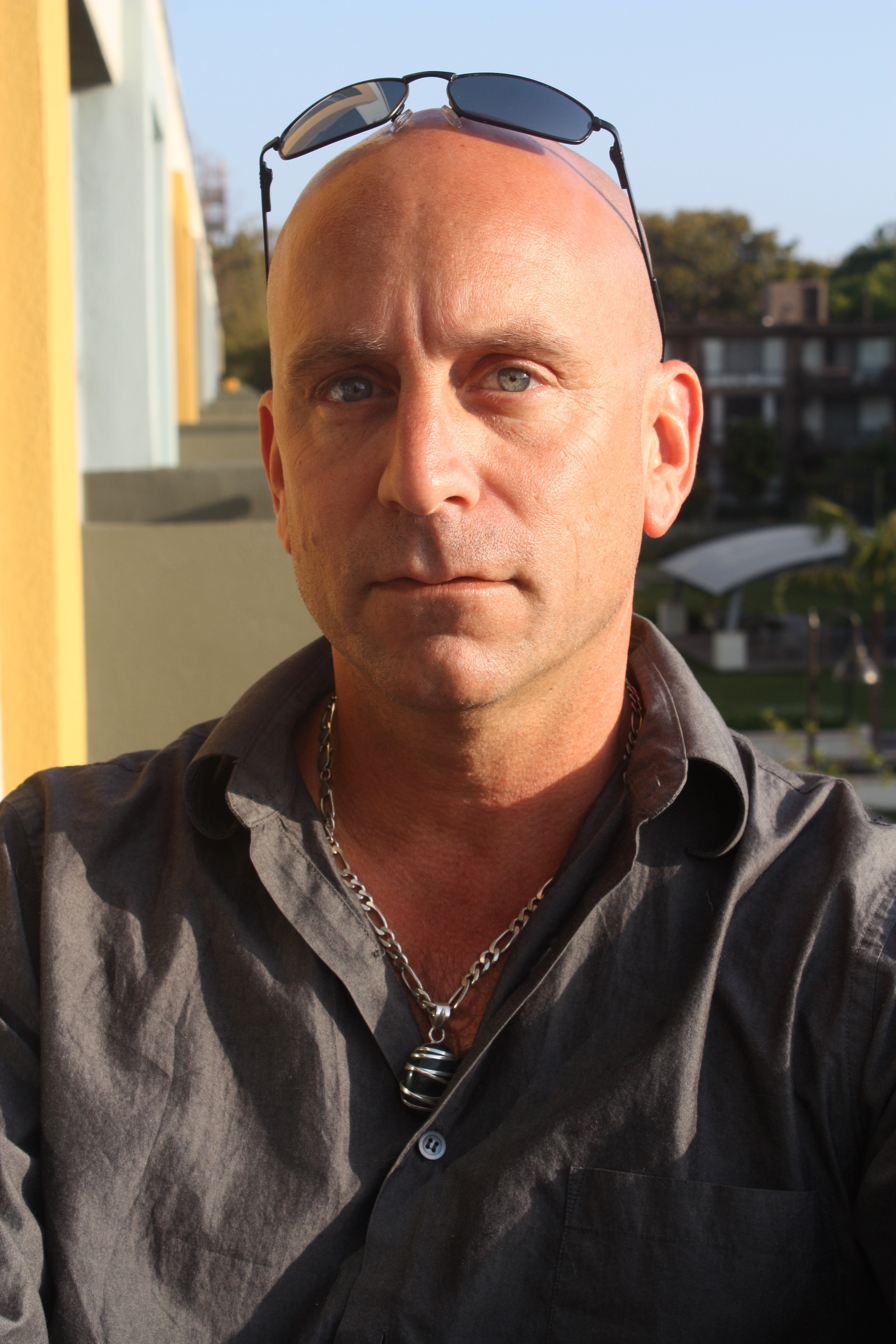
- Born: Baby Boy Johnson (adopted at 2 days); 1965 (age 60–61); Valley Presbyterian Hospital, Van Nuys, California
- Occupations: Motivational speaker; Volunteer at The Freedom to Choose Project
- Known for: Wrongfully convicted of the 1983 murder of his adoptive mother, Dorka; exonerated and released in 2009
- Notable work: Survivors Guide to Prison (2018)
- Television: 48 Hours Mystery (CBS) "The Whole Truth" (2010)
- Height: 5 ft 6 in (1.68 m)
- Criminal charge: CA Penal Code § 187; Murder, Second Degree
- Criminal penalty: 16 years to life
- Criminal status: Arrested 1983; Convicted 1985; Conviction overturned 2009
- Website: brucelisker.com

Bruce Lisker (born 1965) is an American who was wrongfully convicted of the 1983 murder of his adoptive mother, Dorka Lisker. Arrested in 1983 at age 17 and convicted of second-degree murder in 1985, he served more than 26 years of a 16-years-to-life sentence before a United States district court overturned the conviction in 2009 and all charges were dismissed later that year.

== Conviction and imprisonment ==
Dorka Lisker, 66, was beaten and stabbed on March 10, 1983, at the family's Sherman Oaks home. Lisker, then 17, was arrested and, in 1985, convicted of second-degree murder.

He served more than 26 years of a 16-years-to-life sentence in California prisons, including the California Youth Authority (now the California Division of Juvenile Justice; 1986–87), San Quentin State Prison (1987–89), and Mule Creek State Prison (1989–2009).

In 2009, United States district court judge Virginia A. Phillips overturned the conviction, finding that it had been obtained through the use of false evidence and ineffective assistance of counsel. Lisker was freed on August 13, 2009. On September 21, 2009, the Los Angeles County District Attorney dropped all charges, citing a lack of evidence.

== Compensation ==
On October 15, 2015, a settlement was reached in a lawsuit Lisker filed against the City of Los Angeles in which he accused police detectives of fabricating the evidence that put him behind bars. Lisker was awarded $7.6 million in compensation. Confidential memos from the City Attorney to the L.A. City Council, obtained by the Los Angeles Times, called Lisker's case "extremely dangerous" for the city should it have gone to trial, declaring that the potential results of such a trial could be "financially devastating" to the city.

== Publicity ==
Lisker's case has been featured in numerous Los Angeles Times articles, the first of which earned its authors, investigative reporters Matt Lait and Scott Glover, the prestigious Heywood Broun award on behalf of the Times. The case was also featured in an hour-long episode of the CBS News television program 48 Hours Mysteries, entitled "The Whole Truth" (2010) and hosted by correspondent Erin Moriarty, as well as the documentary film Survivors Guide to Prison (2018).

His time in the California Youth Authority is documented in an interview with Gladiator School, Stories from Inside YTS.

His case was dramatized in the CBS All Access series Interrogation.
