= Catathymic crisis =

Concept in the psychology of violence

The concept of catathymic crisis is an old idea in psychiatry, dating back to the 20th century. The theory posits that in a catathymic crisis the perpetrator of a violent crime is overwhelmed by emotion to commit acts of violence, without any reasoned element.

The term was introduced in 1912 by the Swiss–German psychiatrist Hans W. Maier in his paper "Über katathyme Wahnbildung und Paranoia" ("On catathymic delusional formation and paranoia"). The German–American psychiatrist Frederic Wertham used the concept in 1937 in his theory for the motivation of serial killers.

Louis Schlesinger has published extensively on the concept, and has distinguished the concept of catathymic crisis from that of compulsive murder.

== See also ==
- Berserker
- Crime of passion
