= Billy Lee Chadd =

American serial killer (born 1954)

- Chadd in 1979
- Born: December 14, 1954 (age 71); San Diego, California, U.S.
- Children: 1
- Status: Incarcerated
- Convictions: First-degree murder (3 counts); Rape (4 counts)
- Penalty: Death; commuted to 3 life sentences + 13 years

Details
- Victims: 3–4 killed; 4 survived
- Span of crimes: 1974–1978
- Country: United States
- States: California, Nevada (confirmed); Kansas (confessed)
- Date apprehended: April 1978
- Imprisoned at: Mule Creek State Prison

Billy Lee Chadd (born December 14, 1954) is an American serial killer and rapist. Raised by two alcoholics, he began committing crimes at a young age, first getting into trouble with the law for a rape he committed when he was 15. Between 1974 and 1978, he raped and fatally stabbed two women in California. After being arrested for those crimes, he confessed to murdering a man at an apartment in Nevada and a male hitchhiker in Kansas, the latter claim never being verified. Initially sentenced to death for one of his murders, his sentence was appealed, and he was sentenced to life imprisonment at his retrial. He is now serving his sentences at a California state prison.

== Early life ==
Billy Lee Chadd was born in San Diego in 1954. His mother and stepfather were both alcoholics. At an early age, his friends taught him how to steal, and he got away with multiple car thefts. When he was 15, he met his future wife.

In July 1970, Chadd was arrested for rape. He was found guilty and sentenced to two years in juvenile detention based on the victim's testimony and a partial footprint found in her driveway. He escaped from the California Youth Authority (CYA) twice. After his second escape, he knocked on the door of a house. When a woman answered the door, Chadd claimed that his car had broken down and requested to use her phone. The woman refused, explaining that her husband was at work, and she never let strangers into her house while she was alone. When Chadd heard that she was home alone, he decided to break into her home through the front door using a brick he retrieved earlier. Once inside, he found the woman in her bathroom and grabbed her by the hair, dragging her into her bedroom. There, he pushed the victim onto her bed and took off her clothes at knifepoint. After pulling his own pants down, he froze, dropping his knife. A few seconds later, he picked up his knife, told her to stay on the bed, and left the house.

A short time later, he was transferred to CYA's Youth Training School, where he attempted suicide by hanging. He was subsequently sent to Atascadero State Hospital, where he claimed to have had his first homosexual experience. He also first used drugs there.

== Later crimes ==
=== Murders ===
On the evening of July 27, 1974, Chadd broke into a residence in Linda Vista, intending to burglarize it. However, after noticing the home's occupant, 30-year-old Patricia Franklin, in her bathtub, he became aroused. He proceeded to bind Franklin's hands and feet with a drapery cord, blindfolded her with a towel, and forced her into her bedroom. There, he raped her multiple times vaginally, anally, and orally. During the ordeal, Chadd nearly bit off one of her nipples. He later strangled Franklin and stabbed her 15 times with a steak knife, killing her. Afterwards, he ransacked the home before leaving. Franklin's body was soon discovered by her roommate. Investigators found one fingerprint at the crime scene, but unable to connect it to Chadd, the case became inactive.

On August 7, 1975, Chadd met Delmar Bright, a 29-year-old busboy for a hotel in Las Vegas. Chadd stated that Bright offered him $20 and a six-pack of beer in exchange for Chadd posing nude. Chadd agreed, and the two went to Bright's apartment. Once they arrived, Bright asked Chadd to tie him up with extension cords. He obliged, telling Bright to lie on his stomach, after which he tied the man's hands together. He then retrieved another cord and wrapped it around his neck in a slip knot. Chadd asked Bright for one reason not to kill him. Bright thought he was joking until Chadd showed him his knife. Chadd proceeded to cut the victim's throat and strangled him to death. Afterwards, he masturbated before cleaning the apartment in an attempt to get rid of forensic evidence. Then, he left the apartment and hailed a taxi.

On February 15, 1978, Chadd raped and murdered Linda Hewitt at the house she was babysitting for in National City. He bound Hewitt, who was with her 9-month-old son, with a drapery cord, and raped her. At one point, he picked up her son by the hair, threatening to harm him if Hewitt did not sexually satisfy him. He then stabbed her several times, the fatal wound being to her throat. One hour later, shortly after noon, the two kids she was babysitting returned home and discovered her body. They alerted their neighbor, who called the police. Hewitt was last seen alive at a drugstore. The store's clerk witnessed a man with her, who he described as a short, clean shaven man with short hair in his early 20s who had a medium-build. He also wore a t-shirt and jeans.

=== Rapes ===
Chadd, a member of the Marine Corps, was working as an orderly attendant, tasked with collecting background information on Marine patients, at the Balboa Hospital in San Diego. While on the job, he noticed a wife and daughter visiting their father, a patient with a terminal illness. After sifting through medical records, he found their address. On the night of March 31, 1978, Chadd, armed with a bowie knife, broke into their Chula Vista home by cutting through a screen window. Once inside, he made his way to the wife's bedroom and demanded that the woman take off her bathrobe. He proceeded to tie her up with a drapery cord and cut off her underwear with his knife. Over the course of three hours, he raped the victim twice as her family slept upstairs. He eventually allowed her to dress, and left the knife on the dresser. The woman lunged for the knife and screamed for her family. The first to enter the room was her 17-year-old daughter. Chadd had already wrestled his knife away from the woman, and ordered the daughter to bring the rest of the family into the bedroom. After the woman's mother, father, and three youngest children went into the bedroom, Chadd ordered them to sit on the bed, and ordered the 17-year-old girl to tie them up. Afterwards, he forced the girl into the living room, where he raped her. He later cut lamp cords and returned to the bedroom to bound the feet of the family members. He then raped the girl a second time. At approximately 5 a.m., Chadd forced the mother and daughter into his car parked in front of the house. Planning to kill them, he drove to a secluded dirt road near Route 94. However, the road became muddy due to rain, making him unable to drive along it. Because of this, he let the victims go.

== Arrest ==
On the same week as the Chula Vista rapes, Chadd was arrested in Lafayette, Louisiana. He became a suspect after his two rape victims recalled seeing their attacker, who they recognized as a marine, at Balboa Hospital before they were attacked. Chadd had once approached the mother and asked her to fill in her name and address for a benefits form. Fingerprints subsequently connected him to the murders of Franklin and Hewitt. When detectives presented the evidence to him, he confessed to their murders, Bright's murder – who authorities previously charged serial killer Wayne Donald Horton with – and a fourth murder of a male hitchhiker in June 1974. Chadd claimed to have bludgeoned the hitchhiker to death with a rock in Ellsworth, Kansas, before throwing him and his dog into a nearby creek. Although Chadd was able to identify the creek on a map, a search of the area yielded no results, and police were unable to find any matching homicides or missing person reports to Chadd's confession.

== Legal proceedings ==
While imprisoned, he wrote, "Dark Secrets," a 57-page autobiography detailing his life and crimes. Chadd intended to profit from the manuscript's publication, but instead it was taken as evidence for his trial. In 1979, Chadd changed his plea from innocent to guilty, and was sentenced to death for Hewitt's murder and received a life sentence for Franklin's murder, as the death penalty was deemed unconstitutional at the time of that crime. Although Chadd had originally been adamant about receiving the death penalty, he decided that he wanted to live after being convicted. The California Supreme Court ordered a retrial because Chadd changed his plea against his lawyer's wishes, and the court deemed that defendants can not plead guilty to capital crimes if their lawyers object. After receiving a life sentence in Nevada for murdering Delmar Bright, he again pleaded guilty to Franklin and Hewit's murders in exchange for the prosecution not to seeking a death sentence. In all he received three life sentences in prison for the murders and an additional 13 years for the Chula Vista rapes and kidnappings. He is now imprisoned at Mule Creek State Prison.

== See also ==
- Capital punishment in California
- List of serial killers in the United States
