= Christina McDowell =

American author (born 1985)

Christina Grace (nee Prousalis) McDowell
- Born: Christina Grace Prousalis; March 14, 1985 (age 41); Washington, D.C., U.S.
- Occupations: Author; actress; filmmaker
- Website: https://www.christinamcdowell.com/

Christina McDowell (born March 14, 1985) is an American author, actress, and filmmaker, best known for her debut book, After Perfect.

== Early life ==
McDowell was born on March 14, 1985, in Washington, D.C., to Gayle L. (née McDowell) Prousalis and Thomas T. Prousalis, Jr., a prominent Washington, D.C., securities attorney and former decorated Air Force fighter pilot. McDowell had a privileged upbringing as the middle of three sisters, and the family resided in the wealthy Washington, D.C., suburb of McLean, Virginia around the corner from "Hickory Hill," the well-known Kennedy Estate. McDowell was an honors graduate of St Andrew's Episcopal High School a private school in suburban Washington, D.C. McDowell attended Loyola Marymount University in Los Angeles, but did not graduate, withdrawing from the university after her freshman year due to her father's legal troubles, resulting in her family's financial collapse.

== Writing ==
On December 26, 2013, McDowell penned an op-ed for the LA Weekly criticizing the Hollywood film The Wolf of Wall Street and lambasting Leonardo DiCaprio and Martin Scorsese for glorifying greed and "psychopathic behavior" that destroyed families like her own. Her LA Weekly op-ed went viral receiving more than 3.7 million page views and generating international coverage, including a piece in The Guardian. Less than a month after McDowell's op-ed was initially published, publishing houses expressed interest in McDowell writing a book about the events of her life, her father's legal troubles, and her subsequent downward spiral.

Her 2015 memoir, After Perfect, details her family's implosion and her personal experience with poverty, depression, drug addiction, and redemption. People magazine wrote that it was "a brutally honest, cautionary tale about one family's destruction in the wake of the Wall Street implosion." The book was listed as a must-read in publications and digital journals including the Village Voice, PopSugar, Oprah's O magazine, and People Magazine. In interviews, McDowell has discussed the transformative power of writing and how crafting her memoir was a form of catharsis.

McDowell's second book, The Cave Dwellers, about high society in Washington, D.C., was released by Simon and Schuster in 2020.

== Awards and accolades ==
- The Village Voice: 15 Books You Need to Read in 2015
- PopSugar: Best of June
- O Magazine: Season's Best Biography and Memoir
- People Magazine: Twelve Best Summer Beach Books
- Bliss, Beauty, and Beyond: Bachelorette Poolside Picks
- Brit and Co: 15 Must Read Books Coming Out This June

== Other work ==
In the years since her author debut, McDowell has become an advocate for restorative justice and criminal justice reform. McDowell is the co-producer (with Matthew Cooke) of the 2018 documentary, Survivor's Guide to Prison about mass incarceration in America. Additionally, she is involved with the non-profit InsideOUT Writers (a creative writing organization for incarcerated youth), and POPS (an LA-based non-profit that provides support for kids and teens with family members in prison).

In 2004, McDowell featured as the love interest in the music video for the song ”Pain” by Jimmy Eat World.

== Miscellaneous ==
McDowell owned a small Havanese dog named Zelda Fitzgerald.
