= Mule Creek State Prison =

California State Prison for men

Mule Creek State Prison (MCSP)
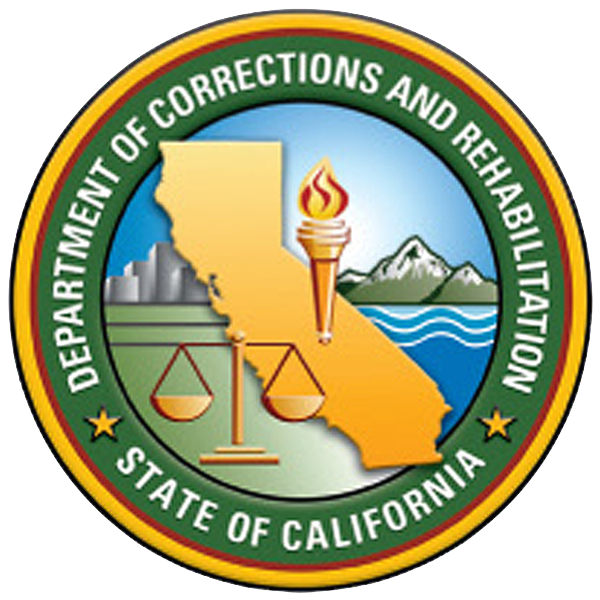
- Interactive map of Mule Creek State Prison (MCSP)
- Location: Ione, California; 38.3703°N 120.9532°W
- Status: Operational
- Capacity: 3,284
- Population: 3,824 (116.4% capacity) (January 31, 2023)
- Opened: June 1987
- Managed by: California Department of Corrections and Rehabilitation
- Warden: Luis Garnica

Mule Creek State Prison (MCSP) is a California State Prison for men. It was opened in June 1987, and covers 866 acres (350 ha) located in Ione, California. The prison has a staff of 1,242 and an annual operating budget of $157 million.

As of July 31, 2022, MCSP was incarcerating people at 115.2% of its design capacity, with 3,785 occupants.

== SNY facility ==
Location of Ione in Amador County and Amador County in California

In 2005, MCSP became the only California state prison exclusively for Sensitive Needs Yards (SNY) inmates. SNY inmates are segregated from the general prison population for their own safety. Many are gang dropouts, informants, sex offenders, and former law enforcement officers.

== 2024 conjugal visit incidents ==
In July 2024, Tania Thomas, a 47-year-old woman, was killed by her husband, Anthony Curry. In November 2024, Stephanie Diane Brinson was killed by her husband, David Brinson. Officials announced that conjugal visits were suspended. Curry's representatives have said that they will appeal. An independent investigation is ongoing as of March 2025, and no charges have been filed pending the results of the independent investigation.

== Notable inmates ==
=== Current notable inmates ===
Inmate Name	Register Number	Status	Details
Michael Carson	C88665	Serving a 75-to-life sentence; has been eligible for parole, which has been rejected.	Serial killer who, along with his wife, Susan Barnes Carson, murdered three people between 1981–1983.
Billy Lee Chadd	C05801	Serving three life sentences.	Murdered three people between 1974–1978.
Steven Carrillo	BU0189	Serving a 41-year to life sentence.	Main perpetrator of the 2020 boogaloo murders in which he killed security guard David Patrick Underwood at the Ronald V. Dellums Federal Building on May 29, and then killed sergeant Damon Gutzwiller on June 6.
Charley Charles	V79696	Serving a life sentence.	Attempted murder of his son David in 1983 by trying to burn him alive.
John Albert Gardner III	AD5185	Serving a life sentence without parole.	Perpetrator of the rape and murders of 14-year-old Amber Dubois and 17-year-old Chelsea King.
Luis Reynaldo "Tree Frog" Johnson	C79631	Serving a 527-year sentence.	Sexually abused a 3-year-old girl and 11-year-old boy.
Patrick Kearney	B88913	Serving 21 life sentences.	Serial killer who murdered at least 21 people from 1962–1977.
Scott Peterson	V72100	Serving a life sentence.	Convicted in the murder of his wife, Laci Peterson, and her unborn child.
Robert Rozier	P99863	Serving a life sentence.	Currently serving time for check fraud. Had been originally sentenced to 22 years for murder as part of a deal with the court to build a case against the Nation of Yahweh.
Rollen Stewart	H87708	Serving three life sentences.	Originally a well-known sports attendee, who always showed up with a colorful wig, was later convicted on kidnapping charges.
Scott Avery Fizzell	P42992	Serving 31 years.	
Anthony Wimberly	E76231	Serving three life sentences.	Murdered three people in 1984.

=== Former notable inmates ===
- Robert John Bardo – Stalker and killer of Rebecca Schaeffer, transferred to Avenal State Prison in Avenal, California
- John Linley Frazier – Mass murderer; committed suicide by hanging in 2009
- Roger Kibbe – Serial killer and rapist; killed at Mule Creek in 2021
- Suge Knight – Record producer, music executive, former American football player released in 2004, later charged with manslaughter
- Bruce Lisker – Wrongfully convicted of murder; released in 2009
- Big Lurch – Former rapper convicted of killing and cannibalizing his roommate, transferred to California Health Care Facility in Stockton, California
- Andrew Luster – Rapist, transferred to Valley State Prison
- Lyle Menendez – Killed his parents alongside his brother, transferred to Richard J. Donovan Correctional Facility in San Diego
- Gregory Matthews Miley – Accomplice of serial killer William Bonin; murdered in 2016
- Herbert Mullin – Serial killer and mass murderer, died in prison in August 2022
- Gregory Powell – Kidnapped two police officers and killed one of them; died of prostate cancer in 2012
- Geronimo Pratt – Military veteran wrongfully convicted of murder; released in 1997 and died of a heart attack in 2011
- Hans Reiser – Former computer programmer and entrepreneur convicted of killing his wife, transferred to Correctional Training Facility in Soledad, California
- David Turpin – Convicted of kidnapping and torturing his own children, transferred to California State Prison, Corcoran
- Charles 'Tex' Watson – Manson family cult member; later transferred to Richard J. Donovan Correctional Facility
