= Demetrius "Hook" Mitchell =

American basketball player

Demetrius "Hook" Mitchell, also known as Waliyy Abdur Rahim, (born September 10, 1968) is an American former streetball player from Oakland, California. He was well known among San Francisco Bay Area basketball players in the late 1980s, but in spite of his considerable talents, he did not reach the National Basketball Association (NBA). Among the NBA players who grew up with Mitchell, and now speak of his talent with great admiration, are Brian Shaw, Antonio Davis, and All-Stars Jason Kidd and Gary Payton. Many have suggested he had the ability to become one of the greatest NBA stars of all time. He attended McClymonds High School and played for local college teams, but is best known for his dominance in local streetball tournaments. Mitchell was listed in Complex magazine as #11 on a list of the "20 Greatest Basketball Players to Never Play in the NBA."

== Early life ==
Mitchell grew up in the Lower Bottoms in West Oakland, living at least for a time across from South Prescott Park. According to his childhood friends, Mitchell had an unstable home as a child, and was driven to the streets by a longing for community. He described the challenges of resisting drug dealers as a child, while his family struggled financially. He played for McClymonds High School, along with Antonio Davis, in the 1980s. His academic struggles initially prevented him from attending college; he excelled in local 3-on-3 basketball tournaments, and would impress audiences by dunking over cars.

He played one season for Merritt College, and two seasons at Contra Costa College. The highest level he reached was playing for what was then known as Cal State Hayward, though he later conceded that he had not enrolled as a student. The playground basketball star's descent into drugs and crime destroyed any chance he had of becoming a professional athlete. In 1999, he was convicted of armed robbery of a video store; he spent the next five years in prison, during which time he converted to Islam, changed his name to Waliyy Abdur Rahim, and competed in prison games. Much of the footage for the documentary Hooked was shot during visits with him in prison.

== Recent life ==
Mitchell was released from prison on April 4, 2004. He had served 51 months in prison after being charged with an armed robbery at a Blockbuster store. Mitchell went to training camp with the Golden State Warriors but was cut. Most notably, he did a photo shoot for Dime Magazine. Mitchell signed a contract with Reebok and his biography is out on video and DVD. He was incarcerated again, and released in May 2011. Mitchell is also said to have joined the YPA (Young Players Association) mixtape squad. Demetrius is the coach and founder of the Oakland Mountain Dew Xtreme, a well known AAU basketball team in California.

== Hooked documentary ==
The documentary Hooked: The Legend of Demetrius "Hook" Mitchell, released in 2003, traces the life of Demetrius Mitchell, who, at 5-feet-10, built his legendary playground status because of his amazing hops that enabled him to dunk 360 degrees over a late model Honda Accord car. Milwaukee Bucks forward Drew Gooden credits Demetrius with the feat of a 360 degree dunk over a car. Mitchell says his best dunk ever was a backboard-shattering dunk off an alley-oop. The "Hook" says that he has been playing above the rim since he was 5'3", but did not dunk in organized games until he had attained the height of 5'5".

Filmmakers Michael Skolnik and William O'Neill interviewed Mitchell in prison, where he described his rough upbringing on the streets of Oakland, and his struggle to survive. The filmmakers also interviewed several NBA stars who also grew up in Oakland, including Gary Payton, Jason Kidd, Antonio Davis, Drew Gooden, and Brian Shaw, all of whom played with Mitchell on the streets and were astonished by his skills. Mitchell himself is shown playing prison league games and is surprisingly still able to play above the rim. The film's soundtrack was produced by DJ Premier. Hooked had its world premiere at the 2003 Tribeca Film Festival.

Hooked was released on DVD by Razor & Tie in October 2004 and was previewed at more than 20 film festivals in the U.S., including the Tribeca Film Festival, and garnered awards in 2003, ranging from "Best Documentary" to bronze medal at the Rhode Island Film Festival, San Francisco Black Film Festival, San Francisco World Film Festival and Worldfest Houston.

Mitchell was also a primary subject, along with Leon Powe, of the 55 minute 2012 Comcast Sports documentary The Town Game: Two Lives, Two Paths.
