= Automobile salesperson =

Person who works in car sales

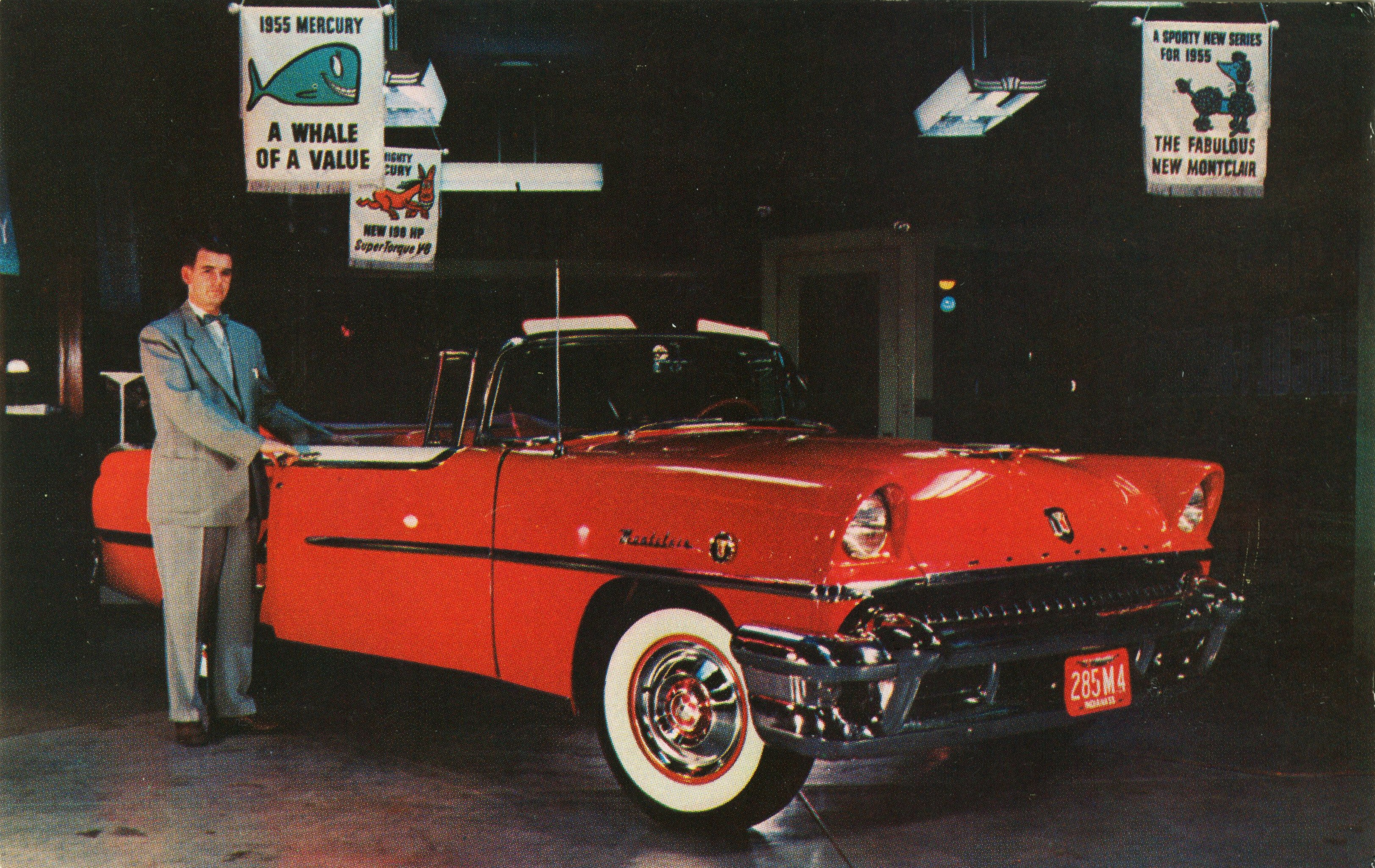
Automobile salesperson in 1955

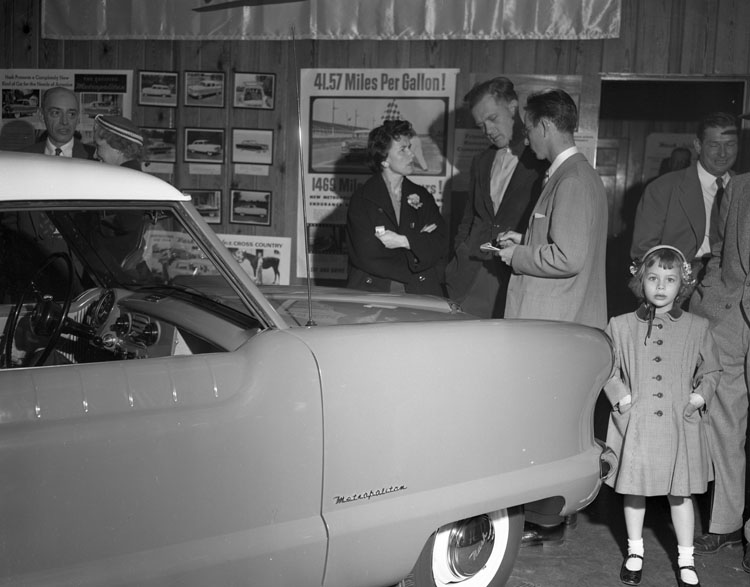
Salesperson and customers in a Nash dealership

An automobile salesperson is a retail salesperson, who sells new or used cars. Unlike traditional retail sales, car sales are sometimes negotiable. Salesmen are employed by new car dealerships or used car dealerships.

== Car negotiation ==
The price of a car, unlike many retail sales, is often negotiable. New cars will often have a factory window sticker (Monroney sticker in the US) listing equipment and options, and the suggested retail price or MSRP. The salesman is traditionally paid a commission rather than a fixed salary, usually based on a combination of profit margin and unit volume.

== Popular culture ==
It is a common theme for the "used car salesman" to be portrayed as a dishonest scammer in popular culture. The used car salesman trope is "modern culture's epitome of the sleazy, two-faced, greedy capitalist out to cheat honest people of their hard-earned money by tricking them into buying damaged or inferior goods", even though such "salespersons are engaged in a perfectly respectable endeavor that benefits millions of ordinary people".

Such salesmen are often well aware of their occupation's negative public image. As Valerie Biden Owens explained, Joe Biden Sr. left automobile sales for real estate when his son Joe Biden Jr. was elected to the United States Senate in 1972, because "he didn't want a United States senator to have a used-car salesman for a dad."
