= Edmund Kemper =

American serial killer (born 1948)

Ed Kemper
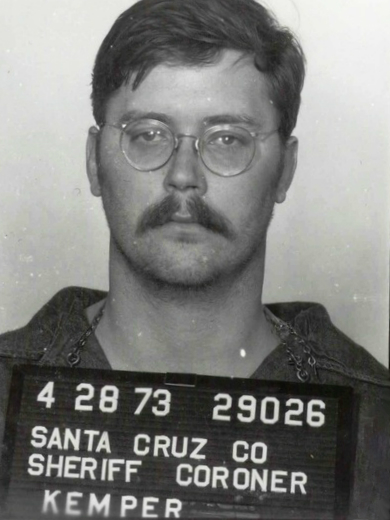
- Mug shot taken on April 28, 1973
- Born: Edmund Emil Kemper III; December 18, 1948 (age 77); Burbank, California, U.S.
- Other names: Co-ed Killer; Co-ed Butcher; Ogre of Aptos; The Mad Titan; Big Ed
- Height: 6 ft 9 in (2.06 m)
- Motive: Lust; Possession; Necrophilia
- Conviction: First-degree murder (8 counts)
- Penalty: Life imprisonment with the possibility of parole

Details
- Victims: 10
- Span of crimes: August 27, 1964 – April 21, 1973
- Country: United States
- State: California
- Date apprehended: August 27, 1964 (first arrest); April 24, 1973 (second arrest)
- Imprisoned at: California Medical Facility

Edmund Emil Kemper III (born December 18, 1948) is an American serial killer convicted of murdering seven women, including his own mother, and one girl between May 1972 and April 1973. Years earlier, at the age of 15, Kemper had murdered his paternal grandparents. Kemper was nicknamed the "Co-ed Killer", as most of his non-familial victims were female college students hitchhiking in the vicinity of Santa Cruz County, California. Most of his murders included necrophilia, decapitation, dismemberment and possibly cannibalism.

Found sane and guilty at his trial in 1973, Kemper requested the death penalty for his crimes. Capital punishment was suspended in California at the time, and he instead received eight concurrent life sentences. Since then, he has been incarcerated at California Medical Facility in Vacaville.

== Early life ==
Edmund Emil Kemper III was born in Burbank, California, on December 18, 1948. He was the middle child of three children and the only son born to Clarnell Elizabeth Kemper (née Stage, 1921–1973), a native of Montana, and Edmund Emil Kemper Jr. (1919–1985). Edmund Jr. was a World War II veteran who, after the war, tested nuclear weapons at the Pacific Proving Grounds before returning to California, where he worked as an electrician. Weighing 13 pounds (5.9 kg) as a newborn, Kemper was a head taller than his peers by the age of four.

In his youth, Kemper performed rites with his younger sister's dolls that culminated in him removing their heads and hands. On one occasion, when his elder sister, Susan Hughey Kemper (1943–2014), teased him and asked why he did not try to kiss his teacher, he replied: "If I kiss her, I'd have to kill her first." Kemper recalled that as a young boy, he would sneak out of his house armed with his father's bayonet and go to his second-grade teacher's house to watch her through the windows. Kemper stated in later interviews that some of his favorite games to play as a child were "Gas Chamber" and "Electric Chair", in which he asked his younger sister to tie him up and flip an imaginary switch. He would then tumble over and writhe on the floor, pretending that he was being executed by gas inhalation or electric shock. In later accounts, he also noted that he was molested by his cousin and older sister, and physically abused by both his parents.

By his own account, Kemper came close to death several times as a child. Once, his elder sister tried to push him in front of a train. Another time, she pushed him into the deep end of a swimming pool, where Kemper almost drowned.

Kemper had a close relationship with his father, and was notably devastated when his parents separated in 1957 and divorced in 1961. Kemper's parents, Clarnell and Edmund Jr., had an acrimonious relationship. Clarnell often complained about her husband's "menial" electrician job. Edmund Jr. later stated that "suicide missions in wartime and the atomic bomb testings were nothing compared to living with [Clarnell]" and stated that she affected him "more than three hundred and ninety-six days and nights of fighting on the front."

After his parents' divorce, Kemper lived with his mother Clarnell in Helena, Montana. Kemper had a severely dysfunctional relationship with his mother, a neurotic, domineering alcoholic who he claims frequently belittled, humiliated, and abused him.

Kemper exhibited antisocial behavior such as cruelty to animals. At the age of 10, he buried a family cat alive, then dug up its body, decapitated it, and mounted its head on a spike. Kemper later stated that he derived pleasure from successfully lying to his family about killing the cat. At the age of 13, he killed another family cat which he thought favored his younger sister over him; he kept pieces of its body in his closet.

Clarnell often made her son sleep in a locked basement because she feared that he would harm his sisters, and stated he was "a real weirdo" in a phone conversation to Kemper's father, unaware that her son had been eavesdropping. She would often smack him for the slightest act of insubordination.

Kemper claims that his mother refused to show him affection out of fear that she would "turn him gay". Kemper also claims that she told the young Kemper that he reminded her of his father and that no woman would ever love him, though Kemper also complained that his mother was always trying to get him to go out with girls. Kemper later described her as "big, ugly, and awkward" and as a "sick, angry woman". Others have postulated that she had borderline personality disorder.

At the age of 14, Kemper ran away from home to his father in Van Nuys, Los Angeles. Once there, Kemper learned that his father had remarried and now had a stepson. Kemper stated that his father "cared more for his second family than he did for us."

In different tellings, either Kemper's father or his mother shipped him off to live with his paternal grandparents, who lived on a ranch in the foothills of the Sierra Nevada on Road 224, about two miles west of the town of North Fork. Kemper described his grandfather as "senile" and said that his grandmother "emasculated" him.

== First murders ==
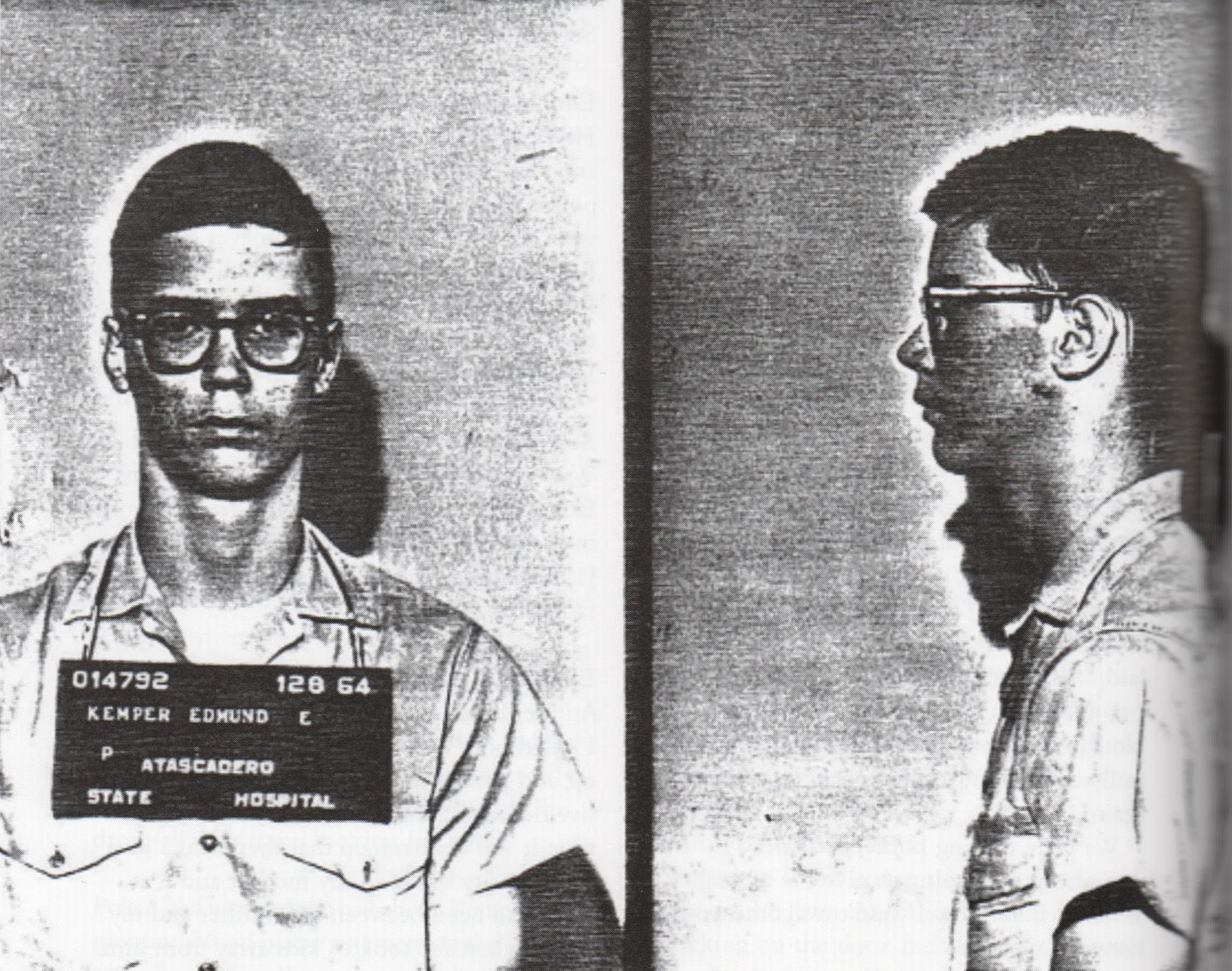
Mug shot of Kemper taken at Atascadero State Hospital in 1964

On August 27, 1964, at the age of 15, Kemper killed his grandmother Maude Matilda Kemper (née Hughey; 1897–1964) with a rifle after an argument, shooting her once in the head and twice in the back, then stabbing her several times. When Kemper's grandfather Edmund Emil Kemper Sr. (1892–1964) came home, Kemper fatally shot him in the driveway. Kemper phoned his mother, who told him to call police. Kemper did so and waited for police to arrive.

Kemper told police that he "just wanted to see what it felt like to kill Grandma", and later said he killed his grandfather because he would be angry with him. Kemper's crimes were deemed incomprehensible for a 15-year-old to commit, and court psychiatrists diagnosed him with paranoid schizophrenia. He was sent to Atascadero State Hospital, a maximum-security facility in San Luis Obispo County that houses mentally ill convicts.

=== Imprisonment (1964–1969) ===
At Atascadero, California Youth Authority psychiatrists and social workers disagreed with the court psychiatrists' diagnoses. Their reports stated that Kemper showed "no flight of ideas, no interference with thought, no expression of delusions or hallucinations, and no evidence of bizarre thinking." They also observed him to be intelligent and introspective. Initial testing measured his IQ at 136, more than two standard deviations above average. Kemper was re-diagnosed with a less severe condition, a "personality trait disturbance, passive-aggressive type." Later during his stay at Atascadero, he was given another IQ test, which produced a higher result of 145.

Kemper endeared himself to his psychiatrists by being a model prisoner, and he was trained to administer psychiatric tests to other inmates. A psychiatrist later said, "He was a very good worker[,] and this is not typical of a sociopath. He really took pride in his work." Kemper also became a member of the Jaycees while in Atascadero and claimed to have developed "some new tests and some new scales on the Minnesota Multiphasic Personality Inventory," specifically an "Overt Hostility Scale", during his work with Atascadero psychiatrists. After his second arrest, Kemper said that being able to understand how these tests functioned allowed him to manipulate his psychiatrists, admitting that he learned a lot from the sex offenders to whom he administered tests.

== Release and time between murders ==
On December 18, 1969, his 21st birthday, Kemper was released on parole from Atascadero. Against the recommendations of psychiatrists at the hospital, he was released into the care of his mother Clarnell—who, by this time, had remarried, taken the surname Strandberg, and divorced again. Clarnell then resided in Aptos, California, a short drive from where she worked as an administrative assistant at the University of California, Santa Cruz (UCSC). Kemper later demonstrated further to his psychiatrists that he was rehabilitated, and on November 29, 1972, his juvenile records were permanently expunged. The last report from his probation psychiatrists read:

If I were to see this patient without having any history available or getting any history from him, I would think that we're dealing with a very well-adjusted young man who had initiative, intelligence and who was free of any psychiatric illnesses... It is my opinion that he has made a very excellent response to the years of treatment and rehabilitation and I would see no psychiatric reason to consider him to be of any danger to himself or to any member of society... [and] since it may allow him more freedom as an adult to develop his potential, I would consider it reasonable to have a permanent expunction of his juvenile records.

While staying with his mother, Kemper attended community college in accordance with his parole requirements and had hoped to become a police officer, though he was rejected because of his size—at the time of his release from Atascadero, Kemper stood 6 feet 9 inches (2.06 m) tall—which led to his nickname "Big Ed". Kemper maintained relationships with Santa Cruz police officers despite his rejection from joining the force and became a self-described "friendly nuisance" at a bar called the Jury Room, a popular hangout for local cops.

Kemper worked a series of menial jobs before gaining employment with the State of California Division of Highways in 1971. During this time, his relationship with Clarnell remained toxic and hostile, the two having frequent arguments that their neighbors often overheard. Kemper later described the arguments he had with his mother around this time, stating the following:

My mother and I started right in on horrendous battles, just horrible battles, violent and vicious. I've never been in such a vicious verbal battle with anyone. It would go to fists with a man but this was my mother and I couldn't stand the thought of my mother and I doing these things. She insisted on it and just over stupid things. I remember one roof-raiser was over whether I should have my teeth cleaned.

When he had saved enough money, Kemper moved out to live with a friend in Alameda. There, he still complained of being unable to get away from his mother because she regularly phoned him and paid him surprise visits. He often had financial difficulties, which resulted in him frequently returning to his mother's apartment in Aptos. Kemper, who was then in his early twenties, met a female student from Turlock High School at a Santa Cruz beach, and the two became engaged in March 1973. Their engagement lasted over a year before being broken off due to Kemper's second arrest. Her parents requested her name not be revealed to the public; she was reportedly 17 and still attending high school at the time.

The same year that he began working for the Highway Division, Kemper was hit by a car while riding a motorcycle that he had recently purchased. His arm was badly injured in the crash, and he received a $15,000 (equivalent to $108,789 in 2025) settlement in the civil suit he filed against the car's driver. As he was driving around in the 1969 Ford Galaxie he bought with part of his settlement money, he noticed a large number of young women hitchhiking, and began storing plastic bags, knives, blankets and handcuffs in his car. He first picked up young women hitchhiking, then peacefully let them go; according to Kemper, he picked up around 150 hitchhikers who were in line with this pattern. This was before he felt homicidal sexual urges, which he called his "little zapples", and which he later began acting on. At times, he blamed his victims for his killing them, saying that they were "flaunting in [his] face the fact that they could do any damn thing they wanted, and that society is as screwed up as it is."

== Co-ed murders ==
Between May 1972 and February 1973, Kemper killed five female college students and one female high school student. He picked up hitchhiking college students and took them to isolated areas where he shot, stabbed, smothered, or strangled them. He then took their bodies back to his home, where he decapitated them, engaged in necrophilic acts with their corpses, and then dismembered them.

Kemper has stated in interviews that he often searched for victims after having arguments with his mother. Psychiatrists, and Kemper himself, have espoused the belief that the young women were surrogates for his ultimate target: his mother.

=== Mary Ann Pesce and Anita Luchessa ===
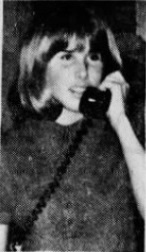
Anita Luchessa

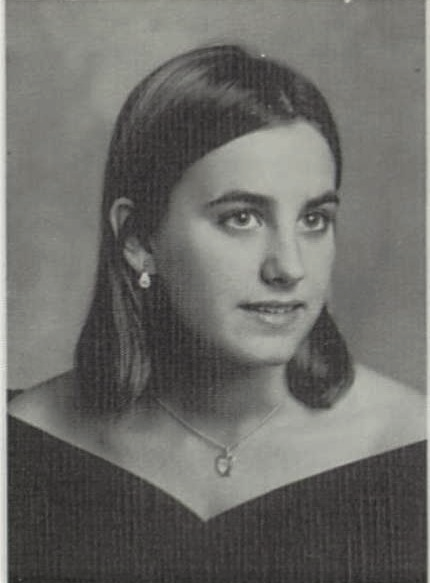
Mary Ann Pesce

On May 7, 1972, Kemper was driving in Berkeley when he picked up two 18-year-old hitchhiking students from Fresno State University, Mary Ann Pesce and Anita Mary Luchessa, who were trying to visit friends at Stanford University. After driving for an hour, he managed to reach a secluded wooded area near Alameda, with which he was familiar from his work at the Highway Department, without alerting his passengers that he had changed directions from where they wanted to go. He then handcuffed Pesce and locked Luchessa in the trunk, then stabbed and strangled Pesce to death, subsequently killing Luchessa in a similar manner. Kemper later confessed that while handcuffing Pesce, he "brushed the back of his hand against one of her breasts and it embarrassed him", adding that he said, "'Whoops, I'm sorry' or something like that" after grazing her breast, despite murdering her minutes later. He also noted that he chose the women because they seemed upper middle class, "of a better class of people than the scroungy, messy, dirty, smelly, hippy types I wasn't at all interested in."

Kemper put both of the women's bodies in the trunk of his car and returned to his apartment. He was stopped on the way by a police officer for having a broken taillight, but the officer did not detect the corpses in the car. Kemper's roommate was not at home, so he took the bodies into his apartment, where he photographed and had sexual intercourse with the naked corpses before dismembering them. He then put the body parts into plastic bags, which he later abandoned near Loma Prieta Mountain. Before disposing of Pesce's and Luchessa's severed heads in a ravine, Kemper engaged in oral sex (irrumatio) with both of them. In August of that year, Pesce's skull was found on Loma Prieta Mountain. An extensive search failed to turn up the rest of Pesce's remains or a trace of Luchessa.

=== Aiko Koo ===
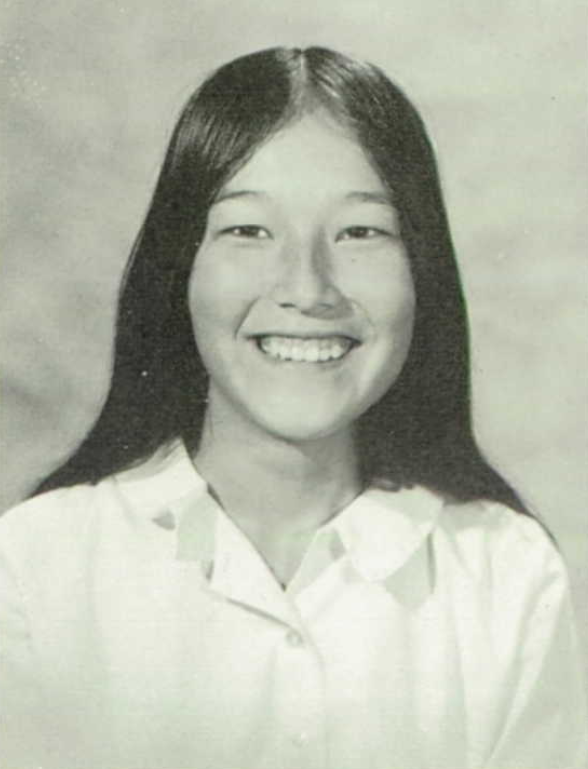
Aiko Koo, pictured in the 1972 Anna Heads High School yearbook Nods and Becks

On the evening of September 14, 1972, Kemper picked up a 15-year-old Korean dance student named Aiko Koo, who had decided to hitchhike to a dance class after missing her bus. He again drove to a remote area, where he pulled a gun on Koo before accidentally locking himself out of his car. However, Koo let him back inside, despite the fact that the gun was still in the car. Back inside the car, he proceeded to choke her unconscious, rape her, and kill her.

Kemper subsequently packed Koo's body into the trunk of his car and went to a nearby bar to have a few drinks, then returned to his apartment. He later confessed that after exiting the bar, he opened the trunk of his car, "admiring [his] catch like a fisherman." Back at his apartment, he had sexual intercourse with the corpse, then dismembered and disposed of the remains in a similar manner as his previous two victims. Koo's mother called the police to report the disappearance of her daughter and put up hundreds of flyers asking for information, but she did not receive any responses regarding her daughter's location or status.

=== Cindy Schall ===
On January 7, 1973, Kemper, who had moved back in with his mother, was driving around the Cabrillo College campus when he picked up 18-year-old student Cynthia Anne "Cindy" Schall. He drove to a wooded area and fatally shot her with a .22 caliber pistol. He then placed her body in the trunk of his car and drove to his mother's house, where he kept her body hidden in a closet in his room overnight. When his mother left for work the next morning, he had sexual intercourse with Schall's corpse and removed the bullet from it, then dismembered and decapitated her in his mother's bathtub.

Kemper kept Schall's severed head for several days, regularly engaging in irrumatio with it, then buried it in his mother's garden facing upward toward her bedroom. After his arrest, he stated that he did this because his mother "always wanted people to look up to her." He discarded the rest of Schall's remains by throwing them off a cliff. Over the course of the following few weeks, all except Schall's head and right hand were discovered. A pathologist determined that Schall had been cut into pieces with a power saw.

=== Rosalind Thorpe and Alice Liu ===
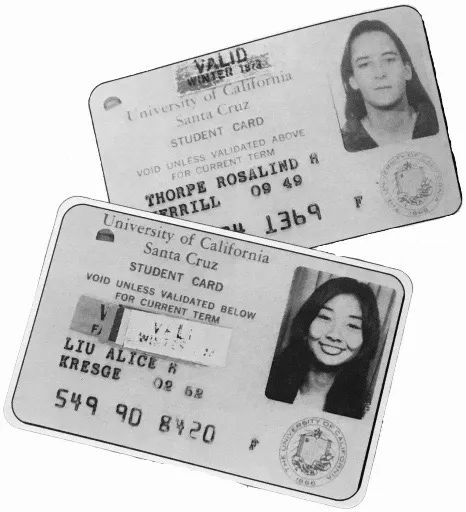
The University of California, Santa Cruz student identity cards of Rosalind Thorpe and Alice Liu

On February 5, 1973, after a heated argument with his mother, Kemper left his house in search of possible victims. With heightened suspicion of a serial killer preying on hitchhikers in the Santa Cruz area, students had been advised to accept rides only from cars with university stickers on them. Kemper was able to obtain a sticker, as his mother worked at UC Santa Cruz (UCSC). He separately encountered 23-year-old Rosalind Heather Thorpe and 20-year-old Alice Helen "Allison" Liu on the UCSC campus. According to Kemper, he first encountered Thorpe as she exited a building, having attended a lecture. Thorpe entered the front passenger seat and, believing Kemper to be a fellow student, began chatting amiably as he drove. Shortly thereafter, he observed Liu—whom he described as a "small Chinese girl"—"thumbing a ride". Kemper stopped his vehicle, and Liu entered the back seat of his car.

Shortly thereafter, Kemper slowed his vehicle, then shot Thorpe in the head with a .22 pistol; he then turned toward Liu as she cowered in the back seat of his car. His first two shots missed, but his third bullet hit her in the temple. Their bodies were then wrapped in blankets.

Kemper again brought his victims' bodies back to his mother's house; this time he beheaded them in his car and carried the headless corpses into his mother's house to have sexual intercourse with them. He then dismembered the bodies, removed the bullets to prevent identification, and discarded their remains the next morning. Some remains were found at Eden Canyon a week later, and more were found near Route 1 in March.

When questioned in an interview as to why he decapitated his victims, he explained: "The head trip fantasies were a bit like a trophy. You know, the head is where everything is at, the brain, eyes, mouth. That's the person. I remember being told as a kid, you cut off the head and the body dies. The body is nothing after the head is cut off... well, that's not quite true, there's a lot left in the girl's body without the head."

== Final murders and arrest ==
On April 20, 1973, Kemper was awakened by his mother, Clarnell Strandberg, coming home from a party. While sitting in her bed reading a book, she noticed Kemper enter her room and said to him: "I suppose you're going to want to sit up all night and talk now." Kemper replied: "No, good night." He waited for her to fall asleep, then he snuck back into her room to bludgeon her with a claw hammer and slit her throat with a penknife. Kemper then beheaded her and "humiliated her corpse", as stated in a 1984 interview. Kemper stated that he put her head on a shelf and screamed at it for an hour, threw darts at it, and, ultimately, "smashed her face in". He also cut out her tongue and larynx and put them in the garbage disposal. However, the garbage disposal could not break down the tough vocal cords and ejected the tissue back into the sink. "That seemed appropriate, as much as she'd bitched and screamed and yelled at me over so many years," Kemper later said.

Kemper hid his mother's corpse in a closet and went to drink at a nearby bar. Upon his return, he invited his mother's best friend, 59-year-old Sara Taylor "Sally" Hallett, over to the house to have dinner and watch a movie. When Hallett arrived, Kemper strangled her. He subsequently put Hallett's corpse in a closet, obscured any outward signs of a disturbance, and left a note to the police. It read:

Appx. 5:15 A.M. Saturday. No need for her to suffer any more at the hands of this horrible "murderous Butcher". It was quick—asleep—the way I wanted it. Not sloppy and incomplete, gents. Just a "lack of time". I got things to do!!!

Afterward, Kemper fled the scene. He drove non-stop to Pueblo, Colorado, taking caffeine pills to stay awake for the over 1,000-mile (about 1,600 km) journey. He had three guns and hundreds of rounds of ammunition in his car, and he believed he was the target of an active manhunt. After not hearing any news on the radio about the murders of his mother and Hallett when he arrived in Pueblo, he found a phone booth and called the police. He confessed to the murders of his mother and Hallett, but the police did not take his call seriously and told him to call back at a later time. Several hours later, Kemper called again, asking to speak to an officer he personally knew. He confessed to that officer of killing his mother and Hallett, then waited for the police to arrive and take him into custody. Upon his capture, Kemper also confessed to the murders of the six students.

When asked in a later interview why he turned himself in, Kemper said: "The original purpose was gone... It wasn't serving any physical or real or emotional purpose. It was just a pure waste of time... Emotionally, I couldn't handle it much longer. Toward the end there, I started feeling the folly of the whole damn thing, and at the point of near exhaustion, near collapse, I just said to hell with it and called it all off."

== Trial ==
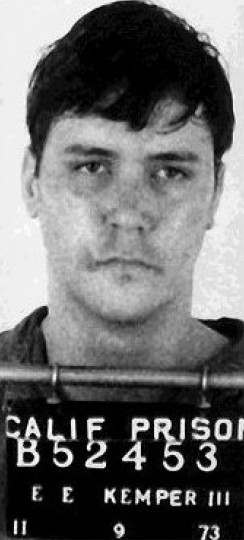
Mug shot of Kemper taken on November 9, 1973

Kemper was indicted on eight counts of first-degree murder on May 7, 1973. He was assigned the Chief Public Defender of Santa Cruz County, attorney Jim Jackson. Due to Kemper's explicit and detailed confession, his counsel's only option was to plead not guilty by reason of insanity to the charges. Kemper attempted suicide twice while in custody. His trial went ahead on October 23, 1973.

Three court-appointed psychiatrists found Kemper to be legally sane. One of the psychiatrists, Dr. Joel Fort, investigated his juvenile records and the diagnosis that he was once psychotic. Fort also interviewed Kemper, including under truth serum, and relayed to the court that Kemper had engaged in cannibalism, alleging that he sliced flesh from the legs of his victims, then cooked and consumed these strips of flesh in a casserole. Nevertheless, Fort determined that Kemper was fully cognizant in each case and stated that Kemper enjoyed the prospect of the infamy associated with being labeled a murderer. Kemper later recanted the confession of cannibalism.

California used the M'Naghten standard, which held that for a defendant to "establish a defense on the ground of insanity, it must be clearly proved that, at the time of the committing of the act, the party accused was laboring under such a defect of reason, from disease of mind, and not to know the nature and quality of the act he was doing; or if he did know it, that he did not know he was doing what was wrong". Kemper appeared to have known that the nature of his acts was wrong, and he had shown signs of malice aforethought.

On November 1, Kemper took the stand. He testified that he killed the victims because he wanted them "for myself, like possessions", and attempted to convince the jury that he was insane based on the reasoning that his actions could have been committed only by someone with an aberrant mind. He stated that two beings inhabited his body and that when the killer personality took over, it was "kind of like blacking out".

On November 8, 1973, the six-man, six-woman jury deliberated for five hours before declaring Kemper sane and guilty on all counts. He asked for the death penalty, requesting "death by torture". However, with a moratorium placed on capital punishment by the Supreme Court of California, he instead received seven years to life for each count, with these terms to be served concurrently, and was sentenced to the California Medical Facility in Vacaville.

== Psychology ==
Shortly after arriving at California Medical Facility in 1973, Kemper was admitted to psychiatrists for re-evaluation. He was re-diagnosed with antisocial, narcissistic, and schizotypal personality disorders.

== Imprisonment ==
In the California Medical Facility, Kemper was incarcerated in the same prison block as other notorious criminals such as Herbert Mullin and Charles Manson. Kemper showed particular disdain for Mullin, who committed his murders at the same time and in the same area as Kemper. He described Mullin as "just a cold-blooded killer... killing everybody he saw for no good reason". Kemper manipulated and physically intimidated Mullin, who, at 5 feet 9 inches (1.75 m), was a foot shorter than he. Kemper stated that "[Mullin] had a habit of singing and bothering people when somebody tried to watch TV, so I threw water on him to shut him up. Then, when he was a good boy, I'd give him peanuts. Herbie liked peanuts. That was effective because pretty soon he asked permission to sing. That's called behavior modification treatment."

Kemper remained among the general population in prison and was considered a model prisoner. He was in charge of scheduling other inmates' appointments with psychiatrists and was an accomplished craftsman of ceramic cups. He was also a prolific narrator of audiobooks for a charity program that prepared material for the visually impaired; a 1987 Los Angeles Times article stated that he was the coordinator of the prison's program and had personally spent over 5,000 hours narrating books with several hundred completed recordings to his name. Kemper was retired from these positions in 2015 after he experienced a stroke and was declared medically disabled. He received his first rules violation report in 2016 for failing to provide a urine sample.

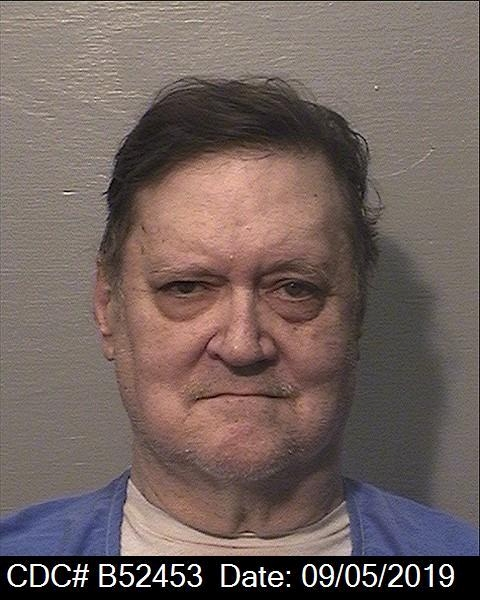
Kemper in 2019

While imprisoned, Kemper has participated in a number of interviews, including a segment in the 1981 documentary The Killing of America, as well as an appearance in the 1984 documentary Murder: No Apparent Motive. His interviews have contributed to the understanding of the mind of serial killers. FBI profiler John E. Douglas described Kemper as "among the brightest" prison inmates he interviewed and capable of "rare insight for a violent criminal". He further added that he personally liked Kemper, referring to him as "friendly, open, sensitive, [and having] a good sense of humor". However, Kemper's discussions with Robert Ressler changed how the FBI conducted interviews with serial killers. According to Ann Burgess, Kemper told Ressler at the end of one of their interviews: "The guard isn't coming back. They're on change of shift. He's not going to be here for 30 minutes. In that time, I could snap your head and leave it on the table. I'd own the prison then. I killed an FBI agent." After the guard came back, Kemper said he was joking. Regardless, FBI agents were required to conduct interviews in pairs and could no longer do this alone.

Kemper is forthcoming about the nature of his crimes and has stated that he participated in the interviews to save others like himself from killing. At the end of his Murder: No Apparent Motive interview, he said: "There's somebody out there that is watching this and hasn't done that—hasn't killed people, and wants to, and rages inside and struggles with that feeling, or is so sure they have it under control. They need to talk to somebody about it. Trust somebody enough to sit down and talk about something that isn't a crime; thinking that way isn't a crime. Doing it isn't just a crime; it's a horrible thing. It doesn't know when to quit, and it can't be stopped easily once it starts." He also conducted an interview with French writer Stéphane Bourgoin in 1991.

Kemper was first eligible for parole in 1979. He was denied parole that year, as well as at parole hearings in 1980, 1981, and 1982. He subsequently waived his right to a hearing in 1985. He was denied parole at his 1988 hearing, where he said: "Society is not ready in any shape or form for me. I can't fault them for that." He was denied parole again in 1991 and in 1994. He then waived his right to a hearing in 1997 and in 2002. He attended the next hearing in 2007, where he was again denied parole. Prosecutor Ariadne Symons said: "We don't care how much of a model prisoner he is because of the enormity of his crimes." Kemper waived his right to a hearing again in 2012. He was denied parole in 2017, and after declining to attend a parole hearing in 2024, Kemper was denied parole again. He is next eligible in 2031.

Following his 2024 parole hearing, it was reported that Kemper used a wheelchair and suffered from diabetes and coronary heart disease. A psychiatric evaluation conducted in April 2024 classified him as a "high risk" to reoffend.

== In popular culture ==
Kemper and fellow serial killers Ted Bundy, Gary M. Heidnik, Jerry Brudos, and Ed Gein were used as an inspiration for the character of Buffalo Bill in Thomas Harris's 1988 novel The Silence of the Lambs. Like Kemper, Buffalo Bill fatally shoots his grandparents as a teenager. Dean Koontz cited Kemper as an inspiration for Edgler Vess, the villain of his 1995 novel Intensity.

The character Patrick Bateman in the 2000 film American Psycho mistakenly attributes a quote by Kemper to Gein, saying: "You know what Ed Gein said about women? He said 'When I see a pretty girl walking down the street, I think two things. One part of me wants to take her out, talk to her, be real nice and sweet and treat her right... [the other part wonders] what her head would look like on a stick'."

A direct-to-video horror film loosely based on Kemper's murders, titled Kemper: The CoEd Killer, was released in 2008. In 2012, French author Marc Dugain published a novel, Avenue des géants ('Avenue of the Giants'), about Kemper. Kemper was portrayed by 6 ft 5 in (1.96 m) actor Cameron Britton in three episodes (nos. 2, 3 and 10) of the first season of the 2017 Netflix television drama series Mindhunter, as well as the fifth episode of the show's second season. In 2025, Chad Ferrin directed and wrote (with Stephen Johnston) Ed Kemper, described as "based on actual events". Brandon Kirk portrays the title character.

Multiple books have been written about Kemper. Extracts from Kemper's interviews have been used in numerous songs, including "Love // Hate" by Dystopia, "Abomination Unseen" by Devourment, "Necrose Evangelicum" by Brighter Death Now, "Forever" by The Berzerker, "Severed Head" by Suicide Commando, "New Flesh" by Pitchshifter, and "Crave" by Optimum Wound Profile. He is discussed in many songs, such as "Edmund Kemper Had a Horrible Temper" by Macabre, "Fortress" by System of a Down, "Temper Temper Mr. Kemper" by The Celibate Rifles, "Murder" by Seabound, "Killifornia (Ed Kemper)" by Church of Misery, "Edmund Temper" by Amigo the Devil and "Edmund Kemper" by SKYND.

== See also ==
- List of serial killers in the United States
- List of serial killers by number of victims

== Bibliography ==
- Cheney, Margaret (1976), The Co-ed Killer, Walker, ISBN 0-8027-0514-6
- Douglas, John E.; Olshaker, Mark (1995), Mindhunter, Scribner, ISBN 0-671-52890-4
- Lawson, Christine Ann (2002), Understanding the Borderline Mother: Helping Her Children Transcend the Intense, Unpredictable, and Volatile Relationship, Rowman & Littlefield, ISBN 0-7657-0331-9
- Lloyd, Georgina (1986), One was Not Enough, Bantam, ISBN 0-553-17605-6
- Martingale, Moira (1995), Cannibal Killers: The History of Impossible Murderers, Macmillan, ISBN 978-0-312-95604-2
- Ressler, Robert (1992), Whoever Fights Monsters: My Twenty Years Tracking Serial Killers for the FBI, Macmillan, ISBN 978-0-312-30468-3
- Schechter, Harold (2003), The Serial Killer Files: The Who, What, Where, How, and Why of the World's Most Terrifying Murderers, Random House Publishing, ISBN 0-345-46566-0
- Strand, Ginger (2012), Killer on the Road: Violence and the American Interstate, University of Texas Press, ISBN 978-0-292-72637-6
- Vronsky, Peter (2004), Serial Killers: The Method and Madness of Monsters, Penguin, ISBN 0-425-19640-2
