= Herbert Mullin =

American serial killer (1947–2022)

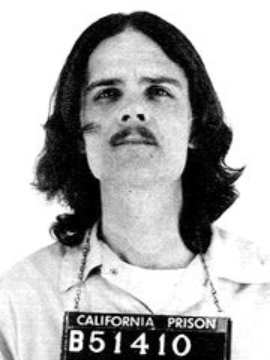
- Mullin c. 1973
- Born: Herbert William Mullin; April 18, 1947; Salinas, California, U.S.
- Died: August 18, 2022 (aged 75); California Health Care Facility, Stockton, California, U.S.
- Height: 5 ft 9 in (1.75 m)
- Status: Deceased
- Convictions: First degree murder (2 counts); Second degree murder (9 counts)
- Penalty: Life imprisonment

Details
- Victims: 13
- Span of crimes: October 13, 1972 – February 13, 1973
- Country: United States
- State: California
- Date apprehended: February 13, 1973
- Imprisoned at: California Health Care Facility
- Website: herbertwilliammullin.org Archived October 26, 2021, at the Wayback Machine

Herbert William Mullin (April 18, 1947 – August 18, 2022) was an American serial killer who killed 13 people in California in the early 1970s. He confessed to the killings, which he claimed prevented earthquakes. In 1973, after a trial to determine whether he was legally insane or culpable, he was convicted of two murders in the first-degree and nine in the second-degree and sentenced to life imprisonment. During his imprisonment, he was denied parole eight times.

Mullin and Edmund Kemper overlapped in their 1972 to 1973 murder sprees, adding confusion to the police investigations and ending with both being arrested within a few weeks of each other after the deaths of 21 people.

== Early life, education, and mental health issues ==
Herbert William Mullin was born on April 18, 1947, in Salinas, California. His father was reportedly stern but not abusive. Not long before Mullin's fifth birthday, the family moved to San Francisco.

Mullin had numerous friends and was voted "Most Likely to Succeed" by his classmates at San Lorenzo Valley High School. The school is in Felton, one of several small Santa Cruz Mountains towns, a short drive from the city of Santa Cruz. Yet the 16-year-old Mullin also experienced difficulties at this time, largely due to paranoid schizophrenic disorder. Shortly after high school graduation in 1965, one of Mullin's friends, Dean Richardson, was killed in a car accident. The death devastated Mullin, who then built "shrines" to Richardson in his room and became obsessed with the idea of reincarnation. He attended Cabrillo College in Aptos, in southern Santa Cruz County, where he earned an associate degree in civil highway technology in 1967.

In 1969, Mullin was admitted to Mendocino State Hospital. Over the next few years, he entered five mental hospitals and was discharged when deemed to pose no risk of harm to himself or others. By his mid-twenties, he had a diagnosis of paranoid schizophrenia, accelerated by his usage of LSD.

== Murders ==
By 1972, Mullin was 25 and had moved back in with his parents in Felton, California, in the Santa Cruz Mountains. His birthday, April 18, was the anniversary of the 1906 San Francisco earthquake, which he thought was very significant.

Mullin believed that the Vietnam War had produced enough American deaths to forestall earthquakes as a blood sacrifice to nature, but that with American involvement in the war winding down by late 1972, he would need to start killing people in order to have enough deaths to keep a calamitous earthquake away. He later said that, for this reason, his father had telepathically ordered him to take lives.

On October 13, 1972, Mullin beat 55-year-old vagrant Lawrence "Whitey" White's head with a baseball bat when the transient looked at the engine of his 1958 Chevy station wagon after Mullin had pretended to have car trouble and pulled over, opening the hood. White had offered to help fix his car in exchange for a ride. Mullin dragged White's body into the woods, where it was found the next day. He later claimed his victim looked like Jonah from the Bible and sent him telepathic messages: "Hey, man, pick me up and throw me over the boat. Kill me so that others will be saved."

Mullin soon set out to commit a second murder with the intent to both test his hypothesis that the environment was being rapidly polluted and to follow a command hallucination of his father's voice directing him to make another sacrifice. On October 24, 1972, Mullin encountered Mary Margaret Guilfoyle, a student from Cabrillo College who was running late for an appointment. He offered Guilfoyle a lift and stabbed her in the chest while driving. He later disemboweled Guilfoyle's corpse to examine her organs for evidence supporting his ideas on pollution. Guilfoyle's body was located in February 1973, several months after her murder.

Shortly thereafter, Mullin began having doubts about the hallucinatory instructions he believed were from his father. This uncertainty led Mullin to attend St. Mary's Catholic Church in Los Gatos on November 2, 1972, with the aim of confessing. While in custody in 1973, Mullin alleged that the priest he spoke to in the confessional, Father Henri Tomei, volunteered to be his next sacrifice, which led Mullin to hit, kick, and stab Tomei to death on the spot before fleeing.

Around January 1973, Mullin applied to join the United States Marine Corps in an attempt to legally conduct what he perceived as his mission but was barred entry when he refused to sign his criminal record.

By the start of 1973, Mullin had stopped taking drugs completely and began blaming the faults in his life on his previous substance use. He decided to locate Jim Gianera, his former friend from high school who first introduced him to cannabis, and whom Mullin subsequently perceived as the originator of Mullin's eventual heavy drug use. In early January 1973, Mullin drove to a remote area of Santa Cruz, recalling Gianera had lived there. The resident of the first house Mullin approached was a woman named Kathleen "Kathy" Francis, a close friend of Jim Gianera and his wife Joan; Francis directed Mullin to Gianera's actual inhabitance (a cabin further down the same road). Mullin proceeded to Gianera's home, where he demanded to know why Gianera offered him the early taste of cannabis that Mullin alleged ruined his life. Mullin decided that the former friend's answer was unsatisfactory and shot him. Dying, Gianera crawled to his bathroom in an attempt to tell his wife to lock the bathroom door, but Mullin broke down the door and fatally shot her too. Mullin then returned to the home of Kathy Francis and shot her and her two children, four-year-old Daemon Francis and nine-year-old David Hughes, to death, then stabbed each victim multiple times after death. The police thought that the deaths in both homes were drug-related and did not suspect they were in any way connected with the priest's death or the previous murders of hitchhikers.

About a month later, on February 10, 1973, Mullin was hiking in the state park in Santa Cruz, where he encountered four teenage boys (Robert Spector, aged 18, Brian Scott Card, 19, David Oliker, 18, and Mark Dreibelbis, 15) camping illegally. He walked over to them, engaged them in a brief conversation, and claimed to be a park ranger. He told them to leave because they were, according to Mullin, "polluting" the forest. However, they shooed him away and stayed in the tent. The next day, Mullin returned and shot all four of them in the head with his .22 caliber pistol, killing them. When he had finished, he took their .22 caliber rifle and 20 dollars.

The next killing happened before the bodies of Mullin's previous victims were found later that week. It occurred as Mullin was driving firewood in his station wagon. He noticed his victim, a 72-year-old retired prizefighter and fishmonger named Fred Abbie Perez, working in his garden in Santa Cruz. Mullin did a U-turn, came back down the street, stopped, put the rifle across the hood of his car, and shot Perez once in the heart. He committed this killing in full sight of the dead man's neighbor, who got Mullin's license plate. A few minutes after the description was broadcast on the police radio, a "docile" Mullin was ordered to pull over and was arrested by a patrolman. Seated next to him was the .22 caliber pistol used to kill the people in the cabins, which he did not attempt to use during his apprehension.

The police failed to recognize a pattern at the time of Mullin's murders due to several factors: firstly, the murders did not appear to be connected by a similar weapon or modus operandi; secondly, the victims differed from each other in terms of age, race, and sex; and finally, Edmund Kemper, who would kill the last of his own eight victims just a few weeks later, was operating in approximately the same area at the same time.

All of Mullin's murders occurred over the span of four months.

== Trial and imprisonment ==
The Santa Cruz County District Attorney's Office charged Mullin with ten murders, and Mullin's trial opened on July 30, 1973. As Mullin had admitted to all the crimes, the trial focused on whether he was legally sane, which under U.S. law means whether he understood the nature and quality of his actions and understood right from wrong. The fact that he had covered his tracks and shown premeditation in some of his crimes was highlighted by prosecutor Chris Cottle, while the defense (public defender Jim Jackson) argued that Mullin's delusions made him kill. On August 19, 1973, after fourteen hours of deliberation, Mullin was found guilty of first-degree murder in the killings of Jim Gianera and Kathy Francis — because they were deemed premeditated — and eight counts of second degree murder in the other killings — because they were considered "impulse" by the jury. Mullin was convicted of the ten murders at the age of 26.

The Santa Clara County District Attorney's Office charged Mullin for the murder of Henri Tomei. On December 11, 1973, the day his trial was to begin, he pled guilty to second-degree murder after originally pleading not guilty by reason of insanity to first-degree murder. He was sentenced to life imprisonment in the Santa Cruz County trial and was denied parole eight times since 1980. He was incarcerated at Mule Creek State Prison, in Ione, California.

While in custody, Mullin said he committed his crimes only in an attempt to save the environment. He was diagnosed by Dr. David Marlowe from the University of California, Santa Cruz with schizophrenic reaction, paranoid type.

Mullin had interactions with Edmund Kemper, another serial killer active in the same area and at the same time as him. The two shared adjoining cells at one point. Kemper disliked Mullin, saying he killed for no good reason. Kemper recalled, "Well, [Mullin] had a habit of singing and bothering people when somebody tried to watch TV. So I threw water on him to shut him up. Then, when he was a good boy, I'd give him some peanuts. Herbie liked peanuts. That was effective because pretty soon he asked permission to sing. That's called behavior modification treatment."

Kemper described Mullin as having a "lot of pain inside, he had a lot of anguish inside, he had a lot of hate inside, and it was addressed to people he didn't even know because he didn't dare do anything to the people he knew." In that same interview, Kemper called Mullin "a kindred spirit there" due to their similar past of being institutionalized. Kemper said he told Mullin, "Herbie, I know what happened. Don't give me that bullshit about earthquakes and don't give me that crap about God was telling you. I says you couldn't even be talking to me now if God talking to you because of the pressure I'm putting on you right now, these little shocking insights into what you did, God would start talking to you right now if you were that kind of ill. Because I grew up with people like that."

== Death ==
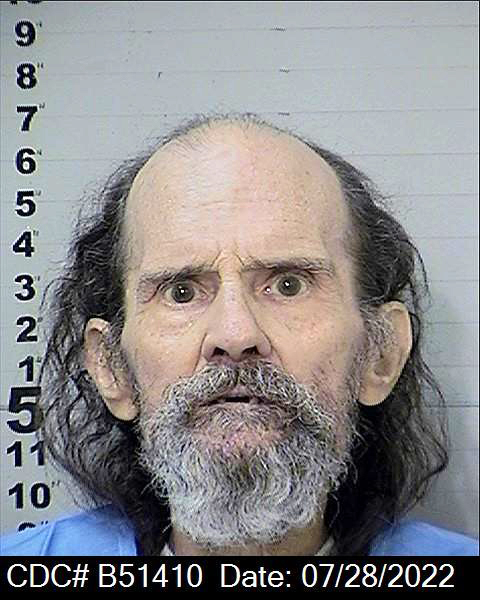
Mullin in 2022, three weeks before his death

On August 18, 2022, Mullin died at age 75 from natural causes while housed at the California Health Care Facility.

== Victims ==
| Number | Victim information | | | Date of murder | Notes |
| Number | Name | Sex | Age | Date of murder | Notes |
|---|---|---|---|---|---|
| 1 | Lawrence "Whitey" White | M | 55 | October 13, 1972 | Clubbed about the head repeatedly with a baseball bat |
| 2 | Mary Margaret Guilfoyle | F | 24 | October 24, 1972 | Stabbed and dissected, and deboned |
| 3 | Father Henri Tomei | M | 64 | November 2, 1972 | Beaten and stabbed through the heart |
| 4 | Jim Ralph Gianera | M | 25 | January 25, 1973 | Shot three times including in the back, puncturing his lung |
| 5 | Joan Gianera | F | 21 | January 25, 1973 | Shot in the neck and head above the left eye, then stabbed three times |
| 6 | Kathy Francis | F | 29 | January 25, 1973 | Shot, then stabbed after death |
| 7 | Daemon Francis | M | 4 | January 25, 1973 | Shot in the head, then stabbed after death |
| 8 | David Hughes | M | 9 | January 25, 1973 | Shot in the head, then stabbed after death |
| 9 | David Oliker | M | 18 | February 10, 1973 | Shot in the head |
| 10 | Robert Spector | M | 18 | February 10, 1973 | Shot in the head |
| 11 | Brian Scott Card | M | 19 | February 10, 1973 | Shot in the head |
| 12 | Mark Dreibelbis | M | 15 | February 10, 1973 | Shot in the head |
| 13 | Fred Abbie Perez | M | 72 | February 13, 1973 | Shot in the heart |

== See also ==
- List of serial killers in the United States
- List of serial killers by number of victims
