= Rodney Alcala =

American serial killer (1943–2021)

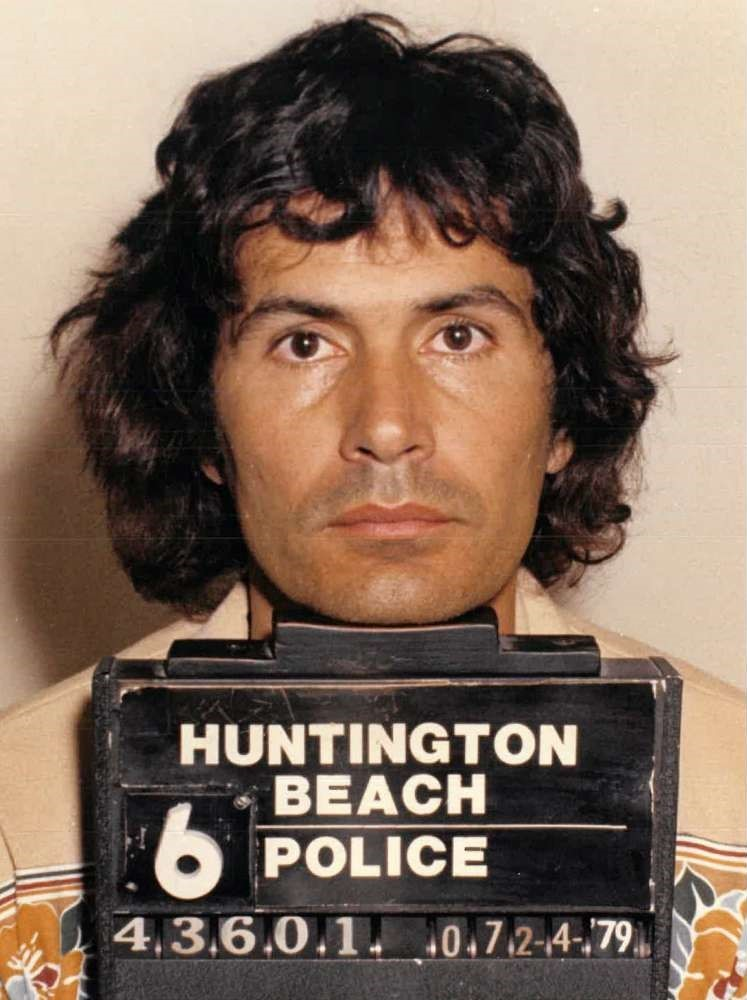
- July 1979 mugshot of Alcala
- Born: Rodrigo Jacques Alcala Buquor; August 23, 1943; San Antonio, Texas, U.S.
- Died: July 24, 2021 (aged 77); Corcoran, California, U.S.
- Other names: The Dating Game Killer; John Berger; John Burger
- Height: 6 ft (183 cm)
- Convictions: Battery, kidnapping, murder, probation violation, rape, providing cannabis to a minor
- Criminal charges: Violation of probation 1 count of kidnapping 1 count of battery 1 count of providing cannabis to a minor 2 counts of rape 5 counts of first-degree murder (2010)
- Penalty: Death

Details
- Victims: 8 confirmed Up to 130 possible
- Span of crimes: 1968–1979
- Country: United States
- States: Washington; California; New York; Wyoming
- Date apprehended: July 24, 1979
- Imprisoned at: California State Prison, Corcoran and San Quentin State Prison

Rodney James Alcala (/ˈælkɑːlə/; born Rodrigo Jacques Alcala Buquor; August 23, 1943 – July 24, 2021), also known as John Berger and John Burger, was an American serial killer and convicted sex offender who was sentenced to death in California for five murders committed between 1977 and 1979. He pleaded guilty and received two sentences, both twenty-five years to life, for two further murders committed in New York State. He was also indicted for one murder in Wyoming, although the charges filed there were dropped. While Alcala has been conclusively linked to nine murders, the true number of victims remains unknown and has been suggested as high as 130.

Alcala compiled a collection of more than 1,000 photographs of women, teenage girls and boys, many in sexually explicit poses. In 2016 he was charged with the 1977 murder of a woman identified in one of his photos. Alcala is known to have assaulted one other photo subject and police have speculated that others could be rape or murder victims as well.

Prosecutors have said that Alcala "toyed" with his victims, strangling them until they lost consciousness then waiting until they revived, sometimes repeating this process several times before finally killing them. One police detective described Alcala as "a killing machine," and others have compared him to Ted Bundy. He is often referred to as the Dating Game Killer, as he appeared as a contestant on the television show The Dating Game in 1978, during his murder spree.

== Early life ==
Rodney Alcala was born on August 23, 1943, in San Antonio, Texas, the third of four children born to a Mexican American couple, Raul Alcala Buquor and Anna Maria Gutierrez. Alcala's father moved the family to Mexico in 1951 and then abandoned them three years later.

In 1954, Alcala's mother moved him and his two sisters to suburban Los Angeles. Alcala was an academically gifted student who was reasonably popular among his peers and was supported by his family. He attended various private schools in the Los Angeles area during his youth and graduated from Cantwell-Sacred Heart of Mary High School, where he was on the yearbook planning committee and on the track and cross-country teams.

In 1961, at the age of 17, Alcala joined the United States Army to become a paratrooper and served as a clerk. During his service, Alcala was noted for being manipulative, vindictive and insubordinate, and he was disciplined on several occasions for assaulting young women. In 1964, after what was described as a nervous breakdown—during which he went AWOL and hitchhiked from Fort Bragg in North Carolina to his mother's house in California—Alcala was diagnosed with antisocial personality disorder and estimated to have an IQ of 135 by a military psychiatrist. He was subsequently discharged from the Army on medical grounds. Other diagnoses later proposed by various psychiatric experts at his trials included: narcissistic personality disorder, borderline personality disorder and malignant narcissism with psychopathy and sexual sadism comorbidities.

After being discharged from the Army, Alcala graduated from the UCLA School of the Arts and Architecture. While it was later claimed that he studied film under Roman Polanski at New York University (NYU), he never met Polanski during his time at NYU.

== Criminal history ==
=== Shapiro assault ===
On September 25, 1968, a passing motorist named Donald Haines called police after witnessing Alcala lure Tali Shapiro, aged eight, into his Hollywood apartment. Shapiro, who was residing at the Chateau Marmont with her family, was approached by Alcala on her way to school when he pulled up beside her in his car and asked if she needed a ride. Shapiro initially refused, but when she heard him say that he knew her parents, she got into his car. Alcala then took her to his apartment, where he told Shapiro he wanted to show her a picture. When the police arrived, Shapiro was found alive in a pool of her own blood, having been raped and beaten with a steel bar; Alcala had fled. Shapiro was in a coma for 32 days and spent months in recovery.

=== Crilley murder ===
To evade the arrest warrant stemming from the Shapiro assault, Alcala left California and enrolled at NYU using the name "John Berger". Cornelia Crilley, a 23-year-old Trans World Airlines flight attendant, was found raped and murdered in her Manhattan apartment on June 12, 1971. Alcala had strangled her with her own nylon stockings, leaving her dead in her apartment at 427 East 83rd Street. It is believed that Crilley met Alcala as she moved into her new apartment and she accepted his help in moving some furniture. Her murder remained unsolved until 2011.

=== Identification, arrest, and conviction ===
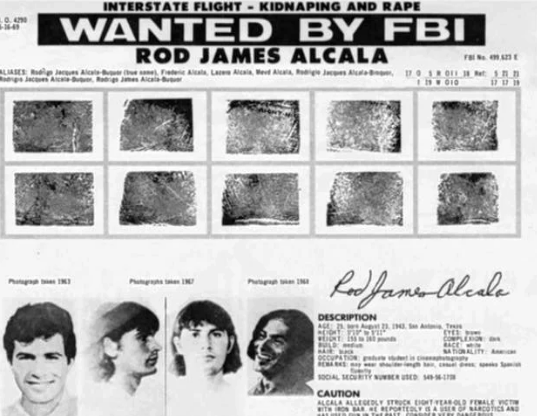
FBI poster issued for Alcala c. 1971

In 1971, Alcala obtained a job at a New Hampshire arts camp (Camp New Beginnings in the village of Georges Mills on Lake Sunapee) as a counselor for children using a slightly different alias, "John Burger." The FBI added Alcala to its list of Most Wanted Fugitives in early 1971 (not to be confused with the Ten Most Wanted List). A few months later, two campers at the arts camp noticed his photo on an FBI poster at the post office. That August, Alcala was arrested and extradited to California. By then, Tali Shapiro's parents had relocated their entire family to Mexico and refused to allow Shapiro to testify at the trial. Without their primary witness, prosecutors were unwilling to charge Alcala with rape and attempted murder; he was instead convicted of child molestation, then a lesser charge, and sentenced to three years. Alcala was paroled in 1974 after thirty-four months.

=== Release and re-arrest ===
Less than two months after his release, Alcala was re-arrested and convicted for assaulting a 13-year-old girl identified in court records as "Julie J.", who had accepted what she thought would be a ride to school. Alcala was again paroled after serving two years in prison, and released in 1977 as a registered sex offender.

=== Hover disappearance ===
After Alcala's second release in 1977, his Los Angeles parole officer made the unusual choice of permitting a repeat offender—and known flight risk—to travel to New York City. New York Police Department investigators now believe that a week after returning to Manhattan, Alcala killed Ellen Jane Hover, 23-year-old daughter of nightclub owner Herman Hover and goddaughter of Dean Martin and Sammy Davis Jr. Hover was last seen at her New York apartment on July 15, 1977. Her datebook showed that she had an appointment to meet with one "John Berger" that same day.

Later in 1977, the FBI received a tip about Alcala's 1971 arrest in New Hampshire, related to the Shapiro case in California. Alcala admitted under questioning to knowing Hover, but investigators could not arrest him, since they had not found her body. Her remains were discovered in 1978 buried under heavy rocks on a hillside overlooking the Hudson River, near a location on the John D. Rockefeller Estate where an aspiring model would later report that "Berger" had taken photos of her.

=== Move to Los Angeles ===
In 1977, Alcala worked briefly at the Los Angeles Times as a typesetter, and was interviewed by members of the Hillside Strangler task force as part of their investigation of known sex offenders. Although Alcala was ruled out as the Strangler, he was arrested and served a brief sentence for marijuana possession. During this period, Alcala convinced hundreds of young men and women that he was a professional fashion photographer and took pictures of them for his "portfolio".

A Times co-worker later recalled that Alcala shared his photos with workmates: "I thought it was weird, but I was young; I didn't know anything," she said. "When I asked why he took the photos, he said their moms asked him to. I remember the girls were naked." Liane Leedom, who was 17 when Alcala photographed her in 1979, reported that, "He said he was a professional, so in my mind I was being a model for him." Leedom further reported that the portfolio Alcala shared with her also included "spread after spread of [naked] teenage boys."

=== Dating Game appearance ===
In 1978, in the midst of his killing spree, Alcala was a contestant on the popular game show The Dating Game. Host Jim Lange introduced him as a "successful photographer...between takes you might find him skydiving or motorcycling." Jed Mills, a fellow "bachelor" contestant on the episode, later described Alcala as "very obnoxious and creepy" and "a standout creepy guy in my life". Alcala won the competition, and a date with the episode's bachelorette, Cheryl Bradshaw, who subsequently refused to go out with him because she found him "creepy".

=== California crime spree ===
- On November 9, 1977, Alcala murdered Jill Terry Barcomb, an 18-year-old girl from Oneida, New York, and disposed of her body on a dirt path near Mulholland Drive in Los Angeles. Barcomb was found in a knee-to-chest position and naked from the waist down. There were signs of sexual assault, and she had been strangled with a pair of blue rope ties and beaten. She also had three bite marks on her right breast. Initially, authorities believed Barcomb was a victim of the Hillside Strangler. However, after the arrests of Kenneth Bianchi and Angelo Buono—neither of whom confessed to or was convicted of her murder—authorities determined that her case was unrelated.
- On December 16, 1977, 27-year-old nurse Georgia Marie Wixted was discovered dead in her Malibu apartment. She was last seen when she drove another nurse, Barbara Gale, home from a bar. When Wixted did not show up for work the next day, Gale and their co-workers reported her missing. Police arrived at Wixted's apartment to find signs of forced entry. Wixted was found naked, posed in a carefully chosen position (see Arrest, trials and conviction section below) on her bedroom floor, strangled with her nylons. She had been sexually assaulted, her skull had been bashed in and her genitals had been mutilated. Prosecutors later used DNA evidence and a handprint found at the scene to convict Alcala.
- On June 24, 1978, Charlotte Lee Lamb, a 32-year-old legal secretary from Santa Monica, was found dead in the laundry room of the apartment complex where she was living in El Segundo. She had been sexually assaulted, beaten and strangled with a shoelace and was posed with her hands behind her back. DNA at the scene would match that of Alcala and DNA on a pair of earrings found in his storage locker after Robin Christine Samsoe's 1979 murder would eventually prove to match Lamb's DNA.
- On February 14, 1979, Alcala picked up 15-year-old hitchhiker Monique Hoyt in Riverside County. He drove Hoyt to his apartment, where he raped her. They then traveled to a secluded mountainous area in Joshua Tree, California, where Alcala took photos of her in her underwear as well as photos of him raping her once again. He bound and gagged her and began a sustained assault, which included further rape and sodomy. Alcala bludgeoned Hoyt in the head with a rock, but Hoyt escaped when Alcala entered a gas station bathroom on the drive back to Riverside County. Hoyt filed a police report about her attack, and Alcala was arrested, but his mother posted his bail.
- On June 13, 1979, Jill Marie Parenteau, a 21-year-old computer keypunch operator, left work early to go to a baseball game. When she did not make it to work the following morning, police went to her Burbank apartment and found signs of forced entry. Parenteau was dead, naked on her bathroom floor. She was posed with pillows under her shoulders. She had been sexually assaulted, beaten and strangled. Her killer cut himself crawling through a window and blood evidence would later identify Alcala as the perpetrator. Parenteau's friend, Katharine Bryant, testified that she and Parenteau had met Alcala at a club several times before.

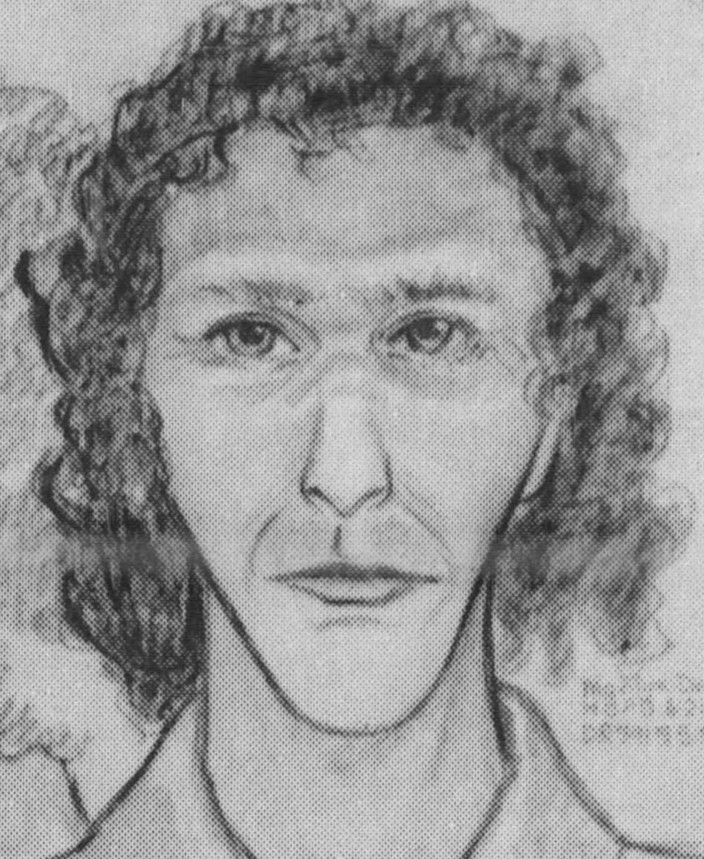
1979 police sketch that led to Alcala's apprehension

- On June 20, 1979, Robin Christine Samsoe, a 12-year-old girl from Huntington Beach, disappeared as she rode a borrowed bicycle from her Huntington Beach home to her ballet class. Her decomposing body was found 12 days later in the Los Angeles foothills, dumped off Santa Anita Canyon Road. She had been beaten, raped and stabbed with a knife. Samsoe's friends told police that a stranger had approached them on the beach asking to take their pictures. Detectives circulated a sketch of the photographer, and Alcala's parole officer recognized him.

== Arrest, trials and conviction ==
Alcala was arrested in July 1979 and held without bail. He went on trial for Samsoe's murder, was found guilty in May 1980 and sentenced to death in June. However, the verdict was overturned by the California Supreme Court in 1984 because jurors had been improperly informed of his prior sex crimes. In May 1986, after a second trial virtually identical to the first except for omission of the prior criminal record testimony, he was again convicted and sentenced to death.

In 1992, the California Supreme Court upheld the verdict, but Alcala filed a federal habeas corpus petition; and in 2001, a United States district court judge granted it, overturning Alcala's second conviction. That decision was upheld in 2003 by a Ninth Circuit Court of Appeals panel, in part because a witness was not allowed to support Alcala's contention that the park ranger who found Samsoe's body had been "hypnotized by police investigators".

While preparing for their third prosecution in 2003, Orange County investigators learned that Alcala's DNA, sampled under a new state law over his objections, matched semen left at the rape-murder scenes of two women in Los Angeles. Additional evidence, including another cold case DNA match in 2004, led to Alcala's indictment for the murders of four additional women: Jill Barcomb, 18, a New York runaway found "rolled up like a ball" in a Los Angeles ravine in 1977, and originally thought to have been a victim of the Hillside Strangler; Georgia Wixted, 27, bludgeoned in her Malibu apartment in 1977; Charlotte Lamb, 31, raped, strangled and left in the laundry room of her El Segundo apartment complex in 1978; and Jill Parenteau, 21, killed in her Burbank apartment in 1979.

All of the bodies were found "posed...in carefully chosen positions". Another pair of earrings found in Alcala's Seattle storage locker had residue that matched Lamb's DNA. During his incarceration between the second and third trials, Alcala wrote and self-published a book, You, the Jury, in which he claimed innocence in the Samsoe case and suggested a different suspect. He also filed two lawsuits against the California penal system for a slip-and-fall incident and for refusing to provide him a low-fat diet.

In 2003, prosecutors entered a motion to join the Samsoe charges with those of the four newly discovered victims. Alcala's attorneys contested it. As one of them explained, "If you're a juror and you hear one murder case, you may be able to have reasonable doubt but it's very hard to say you have reasonable doubt on all five, especially when four of the five aren't alleged by eyewitnesses but are proven by DNA matches." In 2006, the California Supreme Court ruled in the prosecution's favor and in February 2010, Alcala stood trial on the five joined charges.

For the third trial, Alcala elected to act as his own attorney. He took the stand in his own defense, and for five hours played the roles of both interrogator and witness, asking himself questions and addressing himself as "Mr. Alcala" in a deeper-than-normal voice, followed by answering them. During this self-questioning and answering session, he told jurors, often in a rambling monotone, that he was at Knott's Berry Farm applying for a job as a photographer at the time Samsoe was kidnapped. He showed the jury a portion of his 1978 appearance on The Dating Game in an attempt to prove that the earrings found in his Seattle locker were his, not Samsoe's. Jed Mills, the actor who competed against Alcala on the show, told a reporter that earrings were not yet a socially acceptable accoutrement for men in 1978. "I had never seen a man with an earring in his ear," he said. "I would have noticed them on him."

Alcala made no significant attempt to dispute the four added charges, other than to assert that he could not remember killing any of the women. As part of his closing argument, he played the Arlo Guthrie song "Alice's Restaurant", in which the protagonist tells a psychiatrist that he wants to "kill". After less than two days, the jury convicted him on all five counts of first-degree murder. A surprise witness during the penalty phase of the trial was Shapiro. Richard Rappaport, a psychiatrist paid by Alcala and the only defense witness, testified that borderline personality disorder could explain Alcala's claims that he had no memory of committing the murders. The prosecutor argued that Alcala was a "sexual predator" who "knew what he was doing was wrong and didn't care". In March 2010, Alcala was sentenced to death for a third time.

After his 2010 conviction, New York authorities announced that they would no longer pursue Alcala because of his status as a convict awaiting execution. Nevertheless, in January 2011, a Manhattan grand jury indicted him for the murders of Crilley and Hover in 1971 and 1977. In June 2012, he was extradited to New York, where he initially entered not guilty pleas on both counts. In December 2012, he changed both pleas to guilty, citing a desire to return to California to pursue appeals of his death penalty conviction. On January 7, 2013, a Manhattan judge sentenced Alcala to an additional 25 years to life.

== Additional victims ==
=== Unidentified photographs ===
In March 2010, the Huntington Beach, California and New York City police departments released 120 of Alcala's photographs and sought the public's help in reviewing them in the hope of identifying any women and children who may have been additional victims. Approximately 900 additional photos were too sexually explicit to be made public, police said. In the first few weeks, police reported that approximately 21 women had come forward to identify themselves, and "at least six families" said they believed they recognized loved ones who "disappeared years ago and were never found". None of the photos was unequivocally connected to a missing person case or unsolved murder until 2013. One hundred and ten of the original photos remain posted online, and police continue to solicit the public's help with further identifications. Most of the subjects remain unidentified. Police fear that some of the subjects may be additional cold case victims.

=== Morgan Rowan ===
Following Alcala's death in 2021, 68-year-old Morgan Rowan contacted Steve Hodel, one of the original investigators on the Shapiro case, and described being attacked by Alcala in July 1968, when she was 16. Rowan claimed that while she was living in Hollywood, she was approached by Alcala at a teen nightclub on the Sunset Strip and entered his car believing he would be driving to an IHOP restaurant. Instead, Alcala drove to his apartment a few blocks away, where he said he was having a party. When they arrived, Alcala dragged Rowan into his bedroom, barred the door, and then beat and raped her. Rowan was rescued by friends and acquaintances who broke into the room through a window. Alcala fled, and Rowan was pulled from the apartment by her friends.

=== Pamela Lambson ===
In March 2011, investigators in Marin County, California, north of San Francisco, announced that they were "confident" that Alcala was responsible for the October 9, 1977, murder of 19-year-old Pamela Jean "Pam" Lambson, who disappeared after making a trip to Fisherman's Wharf to meet a man who had offered to photograph her. Her battered, naked body was subsequently found in Marin County near a hiking trail. With no fingerprints or usable DNA, charges were never filed, but police claimed that there was sufficient evidence to convince them that Alcala committed the crime.

=== Christine Thornton ===
In September 2016, Alcala was charged with the murder of 28-year-old Christine Ruth Thornton. Thornton and her lover moved away from her family to live in San Antonio, Texas. After they split up in Biloxi, Mississippi, in June 1977, she was last seen hitchhiking and was never heard from again. In 2013, an image made public by Huntington Beach PD and NYPD of a dark-haired woman riding a motorcycle while wearing a yellow shirt was recognised by Thornton's sister.

Her body was found in 1982 near Granger, Wyoming, approximately 6 miles from Interstate 80, but was not identified until 2015 when DNA supplied by Thornton's relatives matched tissue samples from her remains. Alcala admitted taking the photo, but not to killing the woman, who was approximately six months pregnant at the time of her death. Thornton is the first alleged murder victim linked to the Alcala photos made public in 2010. The 73-year-old Alcala was reportedly too ill to make the journey from California to Wyoming to stand trial on the new charges.

=== Other cases ===
In 2010, Seattle police named Alcala as a "person of interest" in several unsolved murders in Washington state since Alcala had rented a Seattle-area storage locker in which investigators later found jewelry belonging to two of his California victims in 1979. Other cold cases were reportedly targeted for reinvestigation in California, New York, New Hampshire, and Arizona.

- Cherry Ann Greenman, 20, was last seen in Waterville, Washington, on September 14, 1976, after she was released from Douglas County Jail. A photograph found in Alcala's locker was shown to Greenman's family and they confirmed it was not her.
- Antoinette Jean Whitaker, 13, was a student who had been living in a foster home when she walked out with an unidentified man on the night of July 9, 1977. A week later, her body was found, fully clothed and propped up on her hands and knees, in a vacant lot in Lake City, Seattle. She had been stabbed to death; there was no evidence that she had been sexually assaulted.
- On February 17, 1978, Joyce Francine Gaunt, 17, was found at a picnic area at Seward Park, Seattle. She was nude and lying on her face; her skull had been crushed. The developmentally disabled teen had also been beaten, strangled and sexually assaulted. She had been living in a group home on Capitol Hill when she was last seen leaving to meet with an unidentified man on February 16.

== Death ==
While on California's death row, Alcala died of a heart attack at a hospital in Kings County on July 24, 2021, at age 77.

== In media ==
In 2010, an episode of the true crime series 48 Hours Mystery titled "Rodney Alcala: The Killing Game" focused on Alcala.

In 2017, the Reelz true crime series Murder Made Me Famous broadcast an episode about Alcala called "The Dating Game Killer". In 2021, the series 20/20 broadcast on ABC did an episode about Alcala called The Dating Game Killer.

In 2017, a biographical film about Alcala's life titled The Dating Game Killer was directed by Peter Medak and broadcast on the American television network Investigation Discovery. Guillermo Díaz portrayed Alcala.

In 2022, a three-part television documentary series about Alcala was released by Sky Crime Original called Dating Death.

In 2024, Netflix released a dramatic film, titled Woman of the Hour, directed by and starring Anna Kendrick as Cheryl Bradshaw alongside Daniel Zovatto as Alcala. The film depicts several of Alcala's murders as well as his appearance on The Dating Game in the midst of his killing spree.

== See also ==
- John Cooper, Welsh serial killer who appeared as a game-show contestant
- François Vérove, French serial killer who appeared as a game-show contestant
- Horace Van Vaultz, American serial killer who retained dozens of photographs of women in his home
- Lawrence Bittaker and Roy Norris, American serial killer duo who was found with almost 500 Polaroid photographs of women in a Burbank motel
- Joseph Naso, American serial killer who was found with hundreds of photographs of women in his home
- List of serial killers by number of victims
- List of serial killers in the United States
