= April Jace =

American athlete (1974–2014)

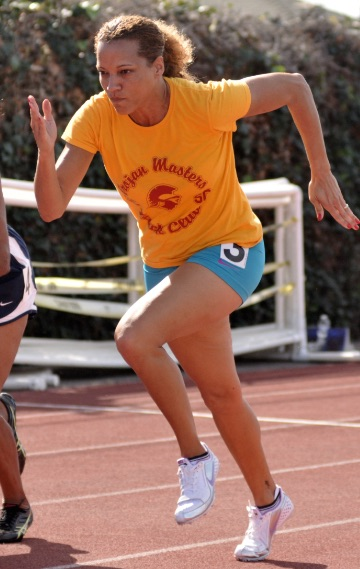
- Jace in 2014
- Born: April Denise Laune; May 6, 1974; Hawthorne, California, U.S.
- Died: May 19, 2014 (aged 40); Los Angeles, California, U.S.
- Cause of death: Murder (gunshot wound)
- Education: California State University, Fullerton
- Occupation: Athlete
- Spouse: Michael Jace (m. 2003)
- Children: 3

April Denise Jace (née Laune; May 6, 1974 – May 19, 2014) was an American masters track and field athlete who ran in sprinting competitions. She was the 2011 world champion in the women's over-35 4 × 100 meters relay.

== Early life ==
April Laune attended Hawthorne High School in Hawthorne, California. She attended college at California State University, Fullerton.

== Athletic career ==
Jace ran with the Elite Health team and later with the Trojan Masters Club. She was the 2013 Southern California USATF W35 champion at 100 meters. Jace finished second in the W35 Invitational race at the Mt. SAC Relays behind only American record holder Joy Upshaw. She was ranked as high as number 5 in the United States and was a 2011 World Championship finalist individually in the 100 meters and won a gold medal on the USA 4×100 meters relay team.

== Personal life ==
Jace was the wife of actor Michael Jace. The couple were married for eleven years from 2003 until her murder in 2014 and had two sons.

== Murder and trial ==
Late in the evening on May 19, 2014, police were called to the couple's address in the 5445 block of Brynhurst Avenue, in the Hyde Park neighborhood of Los Angeles, where April was found shot to death. Michael was taken into custody the following day on suspicion of homicide; on May 22, he was charged with murder.

In the trial, based on detective interviews, Deputy District Attorney Tannaz Mokayef said, "April Jace was an avid runner and the actor shot her in the legs because he wanted her to feel pain."

Later, Mokayef attributed another quote to Michael Jace: "You like to run so much, why don't you try running to heaven."

On May 31, 2016, a jury convicted Michael of second-degree murder in the shooting death of April. On June 10, 2016, he was sentenced to 40 years to life in prison. He is incarcerated at the California State Prison, Corcoran at Corcoran, California.

April's family released a statement to the Associated Press calling her shooting "a senseless act of domestic violence." Her memorial was held at the Oasis Church in Los Angeles, California. A GoFundMe page was created in support of her three children (aged 5, 8, and 18 at the time of her death).

Jace had previously worked for the Los Angeles Unified School District and was "a well-liked financial aid counselor" in Biola University's Financial Aid department at the time of her death. The office was closed in her memory, and the Director hailed her work ethic and service to the university's students. A memorial was held at the university's Calvary Chapel. Biola University has set up a Memorial Scholarship in her name.
