= Cameron Stephenson =

Australian gridiron football player (born 1983)

No. 65, 63, 77, 70, 75
- Position: Guard

Personal information
- Born: 18 June 1983 (age 43); Sydney, Australia
- Listed height: 6 ft 4 in (1.93 m)
- Listed weight: 341 lb (155 kg)

Career information
- High school: Hawthorne (Hawthorne, California, U.S.)
- College: Rutgers
- NFL draft: 2007: 5th round, 156th overall pick

Career history
- Pittsburgh Steelers (2007)*; Green Bay Packers (2007–2008)*; Philadelphia Eagles (2008)*; New Orleans Saints (2008)*; Jacksonville Jaguars (2008–2009); San Diego Chargers (2010)*; Hartford Colonials (2010)*; Spokane Shock (2013–2014); Los Angeles KISS (2014)
- * Offseason or practice squad member only

Awards and highlights
- Second-team All-Big East (2006)

Career AFL statistics
- Receptions: 14
- Receiving yards: 97
- Receiving touchdowns: 3

Cameron John-Ngaue Stephenson (born 18 June 1983) is a former American football guard. He was selected by the Pittsburgh Steelers in the fifth round of the 2007 NFL draft. He played college football at Rutgers.

Stephenson was also a member of the Green Bay Packers, Philadelphia Eagles, New Orleans Saints, Jacksonville Jaguars, San Diego Chargers, Hartford Colonials, Spokane Shock, and Los Angeles KISS.

== Early life ==
As a young man Stephenson attended Hawthorne High School. At Hawthorne, he lettered in three sports football, basketball, track and field 54'8 shot, 141'7 disc. While playing football as the team's starting left offensive tackle and also played defensive tackle and recorded 101 tackles/17.5 sacks/11 forced fumles/9 blocked field goals. Stephenson earning 1st team All-Bay League honors in all three season at offensive tackle and 2 time all CIF, 1st team Daily breeze, 1st team L.A. Times.

== College career ==
He spent the 2002-03 seasons at Los Angeles Harbor College. At Harbor College, he started at defensive tackle for the Seahawks in 2002, 74 tackles/ 11 sacks/ 24.5 TFL's/ 13 Force Fumbles/ 7 Field goal Blocks, earning All-South Coast Conference Honors, JC All-State Honors and helping the Seahawks finish the season with an 8-3 record and a US Bank Beach Bowl Championship. Entering the 2003 season as a JC Gridwire Pre-season All American Cameron had a major injury which sidelined him for the 2003 season, after suffering a knee injury in the season opener vs. Saddleback College. 2 tackles /1.5 sacks to end his junior college career. Stephenson still Became a highly touted prospect and turning down several high-profile college football powers for Rutgers.

After graduating junior college, he accepted a scholarship to attend Rutgers University, switching between offensive and defensive line before settling in as a starter at right guard in 2006. At defensive line 31 tackles/ 4.5 sacks/ 11 TFL, senior year earned All Big East Honors, and made the Rivals.com All-Bowl Team. With all the success he was invited to the 2007 NFL Combine and also was invited to play in the Senior East-West Shrine Game after it was all said and done Stephenson entered the NFL draft as the number 6th ranked guard in the nation.

== Professional career ==
=== Pittsburgh Steelers ===
Cameron Stephenson entered the NFL as a fifth-round pick (156th overall) of the Pittsburgh Steelers in the 2007 NFL draft.

=== Green Bay Packers ===
On 11 September 2007, Stephenson was signed to the Green Bay Packers' practice squad. He was re-signed in the 2008 and started the offseason as the future center until Stephenson got derailed with a calf tear and was out for 16 week, only to be waived on 23 July for Brett Favre.

=== Philadelphia Eagles ===
Stephenson was claimed on waivers by the Eagles on 25 July 2008. He was waived by the Eagles on 23 August 2008.

=== New Orleans Saints ===
Stephenson was a member of the Saints' practice squad until he was signed by the Jaguars.

=== Jacksonville Jaguars ===
Stephenson was signed by Jacksonville Jaguars on 16 December 2008 when defensive tackle Tony McDaniel went on injured reserve. Appeared in games versus Baltimore and Indianapolis at LG. After spending the 2009 season on the practice squad, Stephenson was re-signed to a future contract on 5 January 2010.

He was waived on 7 July 2010.

=== Hartford Colonials ===
Stephenson was signed by the Hartford Colonials of the United Football League on 13 September 2010. Started at RG and was the backbone of the offensive line.

=== Spokane Shock ===
Stephenson was assigned to the Spokane Shock of the Arena Football League on 3 October 2013. He was reassigned on 26 March 2014.

=== Los Angeles KISS ===
On 8 May 2014, Stephenson was assigned to the Los Angeles KISS. Played Fullback and Center.

== Coaching career ==
Stephenson now coaches Defensive line at Mesa High School.
