= Murder of Robin Samsoe =

1979 child murder in California, United States

- Location: Huntington Beach, California, U.S.
- Date: June 20, 1979; 47 years ago
- Attack type: Child murder
- Victim: Robin Samsoe
- Perpetrator: Rodney Alcala
- Verdict: Guilty

On the afternoon of June 20, 1979, 12-year-old Robin Christine Samsoe (December 13, 1966 – June 20, 1979) was kidnapped and murdered by serial killer Rodney Alcala (August 23, 1943 – July 24, 2021) in Huntington Beach, California. Her skeletal remains were discovered twelve days later, approximately 50 miles north of Huntington Beach. Samsoe was Alcala's eighth and final victim.

In addition to killing Samsoe, Alcala murdered seven other young women between 1971 and 1979, in at least three states. He was convicted of killing two women in New York and charged with the 1977 murder of a woman in Wyoming in 2016. Alcala was convicted of Samsoe's murder and sentenced to death on three occasions. The first conviction, which was handed down in 1980, was overturned in 1984 on an appeal. His second conviction from 1986 was overturned in 2001 after Alcala filed a habeas corpus petition. In 2010, he was convicted of Samsoe's murder, and the murder of four other young women he murdered in Southern California between 1977 and 1979.

Alcala died on death row on July 24, 2021, at age 77.

== Background ==
In September 1968, Alcala lured 8-year-old Tali Shapiro to his apartment in Los Angeles, ostensibly to show her some posters. A concerned citizen notified the authorities after witnessing Alcala lead the girl into his apartment. The police arrived at Alcala's apartment shortly after, to find Shapiro unconscious. She had been sexually assaulted, strangled and bludgeoned with a metal pipe. They gave chase to Alcala, who escaped, and ended up fleeing to New York, where he enrolled at NYU. In New York, Alcala assumed the alias "John Burger". Shapiro survived the assault.

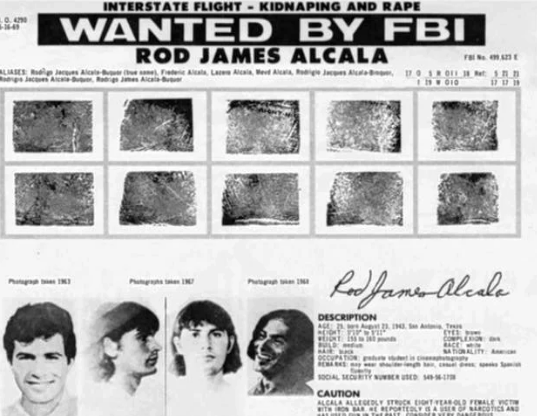
FBI poster issued for Alcala c. 1971

In June 1971, Alcala raped and murdered 23-year-old Cornelia Crilley in her Yorkville apartment, and two months later he was arrested in New Hampshire where he worked as a camp counselor after two girls recognized his face on the FBI's Ten Most Wanted poster. He was subsequently extradited to California and convicted of a lesser charge of child molestation as Shapiro and her family had moved to Mexico and thus couldn't testify. In May 1972, Alcala was given an "indeterminate sentence" of one to ten years and was paroled in August 1974.

In October 1974, Alcala picked up 13-year-old Julie Johnson in Huntington Beach, offering her a ride to school. He instead took her to the nearby bluffs where he made her smoke marijuana and tried to sexually assault her before a park ranger interrupted them. Alcala was subsequently arrested and sentenced to two years and six months in prison for violating parole and providing a minor with drugs. In June 1977, Alcala was again paroled, and a month later, murdered 23-year-old Ellen Jane Hover in New York. Her body was discovered a year later in North Tarrytown. That same month, Alcala also murdered 28-year-old Christine Thornton in Wyoming. Alcala started working as a typesetter for the Los Angeles Times a couple of days later.

=== California crime spree ===
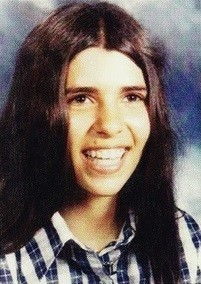
Jill Terry Barcomb

On November 9, 1977, Alcala raped, sodomized and murdered 18-year-old Jill Barcomb, a New York native, before dumping her body onto the secluded Franklin Canyon Drive, near Mulholland Drive. A month later, on December 15, he broke into the Malibu apartment of 27-year-old Georgia Wixted. She was found the following morning; she had been raped, strangled and bludgeoned to death with a hammer. On June 24, 1978, the body of 32-year-old Charlotte Lee Lamb was discovered in the laundry room of an apartment complex in El Segundo, thirteen miles south of her home in Santa Monica. She spent the previous evening at a bar which Alcala was known to frequent, according to authorities, who concluded he had lured her to the laundry room, before raping and strangling her to death.

In February 1979, Alcala picked up 15-year-old Monique Hoyt in Pasadena and, after spending the night at Alcala's home in Monterey Park, he took her to a deserted area in the mountains outside of Banning, Riverside County, under the false pretenses of taking pictures of her for a contest. After bludgeoning Hoyt unconscious, Alcala raped her. He then drove to a gas station to use the bathroom, at which point Hoyt escaped from his car and notified the clerk of a nearby motel, who called the police. Alcala was arrested the same evening and was bailed out by his mother a month later. His trial date was set for September.

On June 14, 1979 – only six days before killing Samsoe – Alcala raped, beat and strangled 21-year-old Jill Parenteau in her Burbank apartment. Evidence suggested that he had cut through the screen of one of the windows and crawled in through the hole.

== Murder ==
=== Disappearance ===
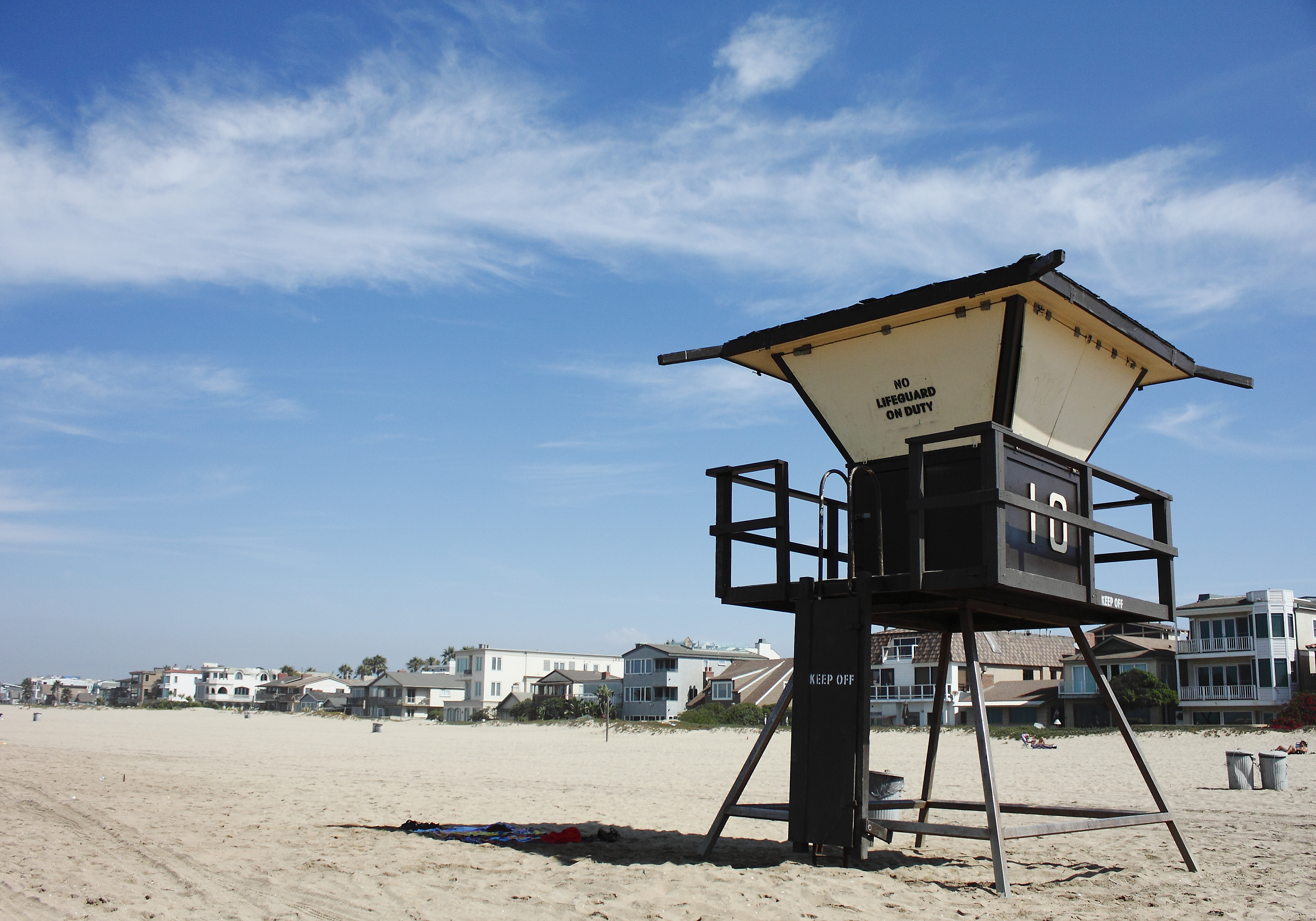
Sunset Beach, the location where Samsoe was last seen alive.

In the early afternoon of June 20, 1979, 12-year-old Robin Samsoe and her friend, Bridget Wilvert, also 12, arrived at Sunset Beach to do cartwheels in the sand, when a man wearing a plaid shirt and slacks approached them and asked to take pictures of them, claiming it was for a photo class. Two minutes after the girls accepted the man's offer, Jackye Young, Wilvert's neighbour, observed this by chance as she walked down the beach a short distance away and found the sighting strange so she approached them. She asked them: "And what are you young ladies doing today?", at which point the man immediately stood up and walked away without looking at Young.

A couple of hours later, Samsoe borrowed Wilvert's bicycle to go to her ballet class, which was approximately fifteen minutes away. At 5:00 p.m., Beverly Fleming, the ballet teacher, called Samsoe's home after Samsoe did not show up to class. Samsoe was supposed to arrive hours earlier to answer phones at the studio, but she never arrived. Initially thinking she had just lost track of time while talking to a friend somewhere, Samsoe's brother Robert Samsoe and mother Marianne Frazier drove up and down their neighbourhood, but to no avail. Her family notified the police and, at approximately 11:00 p.m., a county-wide dispatch was broadcast, placing Samsoe as a missing person.

At approximately 5:00–5:10 p.m., 20-year-old Dana Crappa, a U.S. Forestry Service seasonal firefighter, observed a 1976 Datsun F-10 parked by the road, as well as a dark-haired man "forcefully steering" a blond-haired girl toward a dry streambed at Santa Anita Canyon Road, located at Chantry Flats in a remote section of the hills in the San Gabriel Mountains, near Road Marker 11. Crappa later stated that the man abruptly turned around and "looked straight through her". She kept driving up the road without stopping, and without telling anybody about what she saw. On the evening of June 21, Crappa was driving up the same road, when she saw the same Datsun, next to which the same dark-haired man stood by a rock wall, dressed in Levi jeans and a white T-shirt.

=== Investigation ===
The investigation commenced on the morning of June 21, when Wilvert met up with a composite sketch artist. Later that day, Wilvert was interviewed by two detectives, telling them the man who photographed them was him in his 30s and approximately six feet tall. On June 26, the Huntington Beach Police Department received a call from a state police officer who told them the composite sketch that had been broadcast on television looked like one of his parolees, Rodney Alcala. The officer stated that Alcala had an "abnormal sexual interest in young girls", at which point the HBPD ran a background check on him and learned that he was charged with raping a 15-year-old girl. Alcala became a person of interest in the case shortly afterwards.

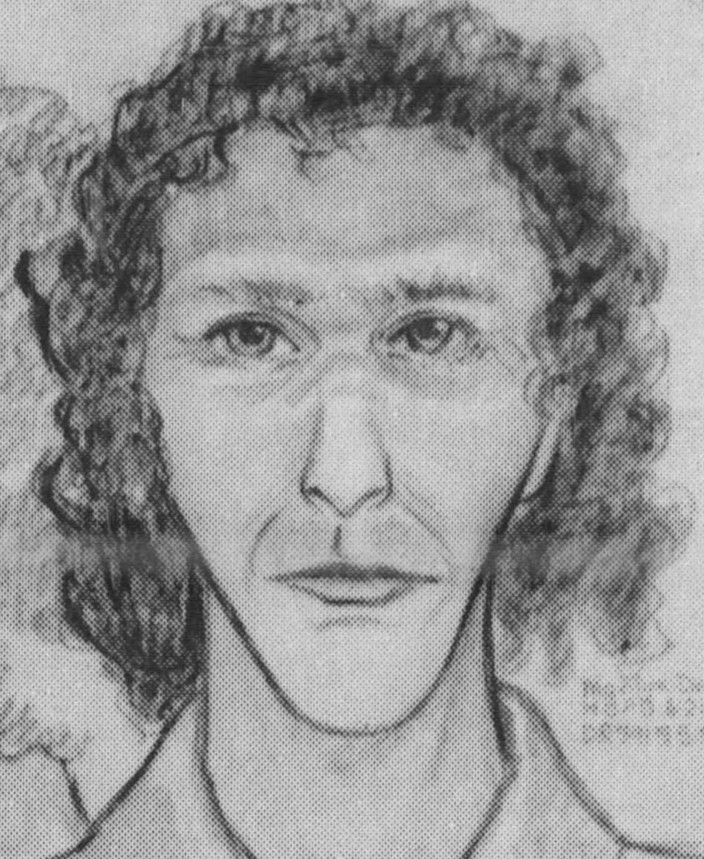
1979 police sketch that led to Alcala's apprehension

The detectives further zoned in on Alcala after one of them recognized him on television during a rerun of the Dating Game television game show where Alcala participated in September 1978. His resemblance to the composite sketch, along with the discovery of the 1974 Julie Johnson case, only increased his suspicion to the detectives. The following day, two teens, Joanne Murchland and Toni Esparza – who previously told the authorities that a man photographed them on the beach and offered them marijuana on June 19 – came to the police station, where they both picked out Alcala in a photographic lineup of six men. On June 28, the police began their surveillance of Alcala, primarily the home in Monterey Park where he lived at the time.

=== Discovery of remains ===
On the evening of June 25, Crappa, disturbed by what she saw a couple of days earlier, drove to the same location where she saw the man steering the girl into the woods, near Marker 11. She approached the ravine, where she found a decomposing body. She later testified that the body looked as if it was ravaged by animals. Once again, Crappa did not tell anybody about what she saw. Four days later, she and a colleague, William Poepke, stumbled upon the remains but, thinking they were deer bones, he ignored it.

On July 2, at approximately 3:50 p.m., Poepke was working at the same location when he discovered a skull and a skeleton, lying in dirt gully approximately 110 feet northeast from the road. He subsequently contacted the Sierra Madre Police Department. The autopsy report was finished on July 6, however, due to the extensive decomposition of the remains, it was virtually impossible to determine the cause of death and whether the victim had been sexually assaulted. That evening, the remains were identified as that of Robin Samsoe through dental records. Her head and hands had been severed, most likely by wild animals.

On July 7, the detectives at the HBPD formed a search line in the area where Samsoe's remains were found to move through the terrain and look for clues. A little up the hill from where Samsoe's skeleton was found, the team discovered a large Kane Kut knife discarded in a dense bush. Next to the bush they found strands of blonde hair. A large area of the soil next to the bush had been saturated with decomposing body fluids. A couple of feet down the hill, a severed fingertip was discovered. They surmised that Robin Samsoe was murdered up the hill, and that her dead body was then dragged down and mutilated by wild animals.

=== Arrest ===
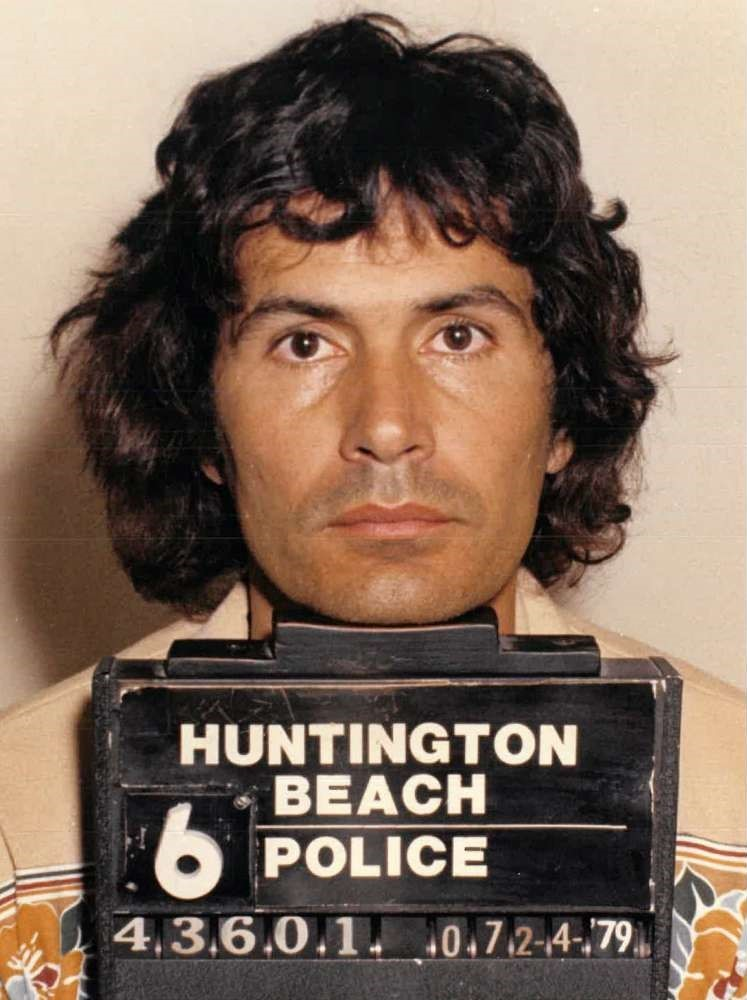
Alcala's mug shot following his arrest on July 24, 1979

By mid-July, Alcala had become a prime suspect, largely based on his resemblance to the sketch and the tips received by the HBPD. Alcala was arrested in the early hours of July 24 at his mother's home at 1370 Abajo Drive in Monterey Park. After booking Alcala at the police station, they executed a search warrant of the residence and also of Alcala's Datsun. A Kane Kut knife set was discovered in the home. They also found more than 1,200 photographs in Alcala's bedroom. When told that he was being held for the murder of Robin Samsoe, Alcala told them he had a solid alibi for June 20, claiming he was at Knott's Berry Farm interviewing for a job, although there was nobody who could confirm this.

Alcala's younger sister visited him in jail on the evening of July 24. During their conversation, which was being surreptitiously taped by the authorities, Alcala informed his sister of a storage shed in Seattle. On the afternoon of July 26, two detectives flew to Seattle and searched the storage unit Alcala told his sister about, discovering over 2,000 photographs and film, as well as several pairs of earrings hidden in a jewelry pouch. The authorities later showed Marianne Frazier several pieces of the jewelry they found to see if any of it belonged to her daughter. Frazier then pointed out a pair of gold bell earrings that Samsoe was known to wear.

== First trial (1980) ==
Alcala was arraigned on July 26, during which he pleaded not guilty to the charges of murder, robbery, kidnapping and lewd or lascivious acts upon child under fourteen. He was denied bail, and, upon Alcala's own request, appointed a public defender. On August 14, Alcala was appointed a new public defender, John Barnett, as his previous attorney Chris Strople was taken off the case due to a conflict of interest. The preliminary hearing for Alcala commenced in September 1979. Dana Crappa was called as a witness for the prosecution. During one of the hearings, Crappa changed her story by claiming to have seen the man resembling Alcala standing by the Datsun on June 21, between 10:00 and 10:30 p.m., which differed from the version she told the officers in August; that she saw the man on June 14.

Alcala was also still set to stand trial for the rape of Monique Hoyt, but that was ultimately postponed after Hoyt was ordered to undergo psychiatric examination. The pretrial motions occurred in February 1980. One of these motions included whether or not Alcala's previous offenses, which included abductions and sexual assaults were admissible as evidence. Judge Philip Schwab eventually granted the motion, allowing Alcala's previous crimes, such as the 1968 assault of Tali Shapiro, the 1974 abduction of Julie Johnson, the 1979 abduction and rape of Monique Hoyt, and his possible involvement in the 1977 murder of Ellen Jane Hover, to be used as evidence during the trial, a decisive victory for the prosecution.

The trial began on March 6, 1980, and concluded on April 30. The prosecution's main witness was Dana Crappa, although their case also relied on the testimony of an inmate from Orange County Jail where Alcala was being detained, who claimed to have overheard Alcala confess to another inmate that he had killed Samsoe. Samsoe's mother, Marianne Frazier, also testified that the gold earrings found in Alcala's storage unit belonged to her daughter. The defense mostly attacked Crappa's credibility as a witness, pointing out several inconsistencies in her statements, such as that she saw Alcala on June 21 between 10:00 and 10:30 p.m., when phone bill records show Alcala had called his girlfriend at 10:08 p.m. that night.

Both of Alcala's sisters testified for the defense, providing an alibi for Alcala on June 20. The defense also called a second inmate from Orange County Jail to the witness stand, who claimed that he and two other inmates (including the one who testified) made up the admissions to strike a bargain with the authorities. In early April, the charge of "lewd or lascivious acts upon child under fourteen" was dismissed. Ultimately, on April 30, Alcala was found guilty of kidnapping and murder, and on May 8, he was sentenced to death.

Rodney Alcala is a cold and calculating killer; a man who stalks little girls for selfish, aberrant purposes. This beast stole Robin Samsoe's life. What other penalty is appropriate for the murder of a little girl, besides the death penalty?

— District Attorney Richard Farnell's closing argument

In September 1980, Alcala was sentenced to 9 years in prison in Riverside County for the rape of Monique Hoyt.

=== Overturn of conviction (1984) ===
After a failed 1981 appeal to have the kidnapping charge (which carried a special circumstance charge) dismissed, in 1984, Alcala's defense team filed an appeal of the 1980 death sentence. In a five-to-one decision, the Supreme Court of California overturned Alcala's conviction and reversed the death sentence on grounds that the jurors were wrongly informed of Alcala's past sex offenses, which "did not establish [Alcala's] identity as the perpetrator, nor did those prior offenses establish intent, plan, scheme or motive."

== Second trial (1986) ==
Despite the reversal of his sentence, Alcala was once again charged with the kidnapping, false imprisonment and use of a deadly weapon, a knife and murder of Robin Samsoe, to which he again pled not guilty. The second trial commenced on April 23, 1986, during which Alcala's new attorney John Patrick Dolan claimed that Dana Crappa (who was once again supposed to be the prosecution's main witness) was "intimidated and badgered" to testify by the police and prosecutors. He also attacked the credibility of the jailhouse informants who testified for the prosecution.

Among those who testified for the prosecution were Frederick Williams, an inmate who claimed that in 1980, Alcala, his cellmate at the time, confessed to killing Samsoe and described how he got rid of her bicycle; Jackye Young, the woman who saw Alcala photographing Samsoe and her friend, and Joanne Murchland and Toni Esparza, two women who claimed Alcala took photographs of them on June 19, 1979, and offered them marijuana. Dana Crappa was ultimately ruled to be incapable of appearing as a witness after she confided to Judge Donald McCartin that she didn't remember what she testified to during the first trial. Once again, Alcala's two sisters and his girlfriend testified in favour of the defense, providing him an alibi for the days of June 20 and June 21, 1979.

On May 28, 1986, after four days of deliberation, the jury found Alcala guilty on all counts. On June 9, the sentencing phase began, during which Alcala testified in his own defense, pleading to the jury: "Please don't kill me. I don't think I should die for something I didn't do." The prosecution, in turn, called Tali Shapiro to the witness stand, who testified how Alcala kidnapped, raped and almost killed her in 1968. The prosecution ended their arguments with:

[Alcala] is the epitome of malevolence. He is a sexual carnivore, and the meat he thrives on is our children."

Ultimately, on August 20, Alcala was sentenced to death, for the second time.

=== Overturn of conviction (2001) ===
On March 30, 2001, Alcala's 1986 conviction was overturned by the district court on the grounds that Judge McCartin ruled incorrectly when he did not allow an expert psychologist to testify that Dana Crappa's statements "appear induced", while allowing the defense to read out her testimony from the 1980 trial to the jury. It was also stated that Alcala's lawyers should have been allowed to introduce a psychologist's testimony that cast doubt on Crappa's amnesia claim. The decision was upheld in 2003 and Alcala was granted a new trial.

== Third trial (2010) ==
In June 2003, in addition to being charged with killing Samsoe, Alcala was charged with the 1977 rape and murder of Georgia Wixted by the Los Angeles County prosecutors after being linked to the crime via DNA. On October 7, 2003, Alcala pleaded not guilty to the murder of Robin Samsoe and opted to act as his own attorney for the upcoming trial, set to commence in 2005. In 2004, he was linked, again via DNA, to the 1977 murder of Jill Barcomb in Los Angeles. Despite this, Alcala was still set to stand trial for Samsoe's murder first. In early 2005, he was also linked to the June 1978 murder of 32-year-old Charlotte Lamb.

In November 2005, Alcala pleaded not guilty to the murders of Jill Barcomb, Georgia Wixted, Charlotte Lamb and Jill Parenteau. In May 2006, Judge Francisco Briseño ruled that Alcala would be tried for the murders of four Los Angeles women and the murder of Robin Samsoe in a single trial, that would take place in Orange County, where prosecutors from both Orange County and Los Angeles County would work together. In September 2009, Alcala was granted his request to act in propria persona, meaning he would act as his own sole attorney, and not as co-counsel to his defense team as he previously appealed in October 2003.

Jury selection concluded in early January 2010 and the trial itself commenced shortly afterwards. The prosecution noted the similarities between the murders and the DNA evidence which directly linked Alcala to the murders of Barcomb, Wixted, Lamb and Parenteau, as well as earrings found in Alcala's Seattle storage unit that belonged to Lamb and Samsoe. Among those who testified for the prosecution were medical examiners, deputy sheriffs, forensic experts, Samsoe's friend Bridget Wilvert and Jackye Young, who also testified in both of Alcala's previous trials. Samsoe's mother also testified and was one of the several witnesses who was cross-examined by Alcala.

During his opening statement, Alcala primarily addressed the Samsoe case, seldom mentioning the four other murders he was charged with, claiming the gold bell earrings recovered from his storage unit belonged to him, not Samsoe. Elizabeth Kelleher, who was Alcala's girlfriend at the time of his arrest in 1979, testified in favour of the defense, claiming she helped him prepare folders to bring to Knott's Berry Farm the following day, the same day Samsoe disappeared. On February 10, Alcala was cross-examined by the prosecution, during which he admitted that he had been photographing girls in bikinis the day of Samsoe's murder and that he installed a new carpet in his Datsun the day after, ostensibly because he spilled gasoline on it. Alcala was also cross-examined about his previous offenses, including the 1968 assault and the 1979 rape of Monique Hoyt.

On February 25, 2010, after two days of deliberation, Alcala was found guilty on all counts; five counts of murder and one count of kidnapping. The sentencing phase commenced on March 2, during which Alcala cross-examined Tali Shapiro and apologized to her: "I sincerely regret what happened. I apologize for my despicable behaviour." For the prosecution, the families of the victims took the stand, with Alcala rarely cross-examining any of them. For the defense, Alcala's court-appointed psychiatrist testified that the defendant likely suffered from borderline personality disorder, and that he couldn't remember killing any of his victims.

On March 9, 2010, after an hour of deliberation, the jury sentenced Alcala to death. The verdict was upheld during a hearing on sentencing on March 31.

== Aftermath ==
In January 2011, a New York grand jury indicted Alcala for the 1971 murder of Cornelia Crilley and the 1977 murder of Ellen Jane Hover. In June 2012, Alcala was extradited from California to New York and subsequently pled not guilty to both charges. In December, however, Alcala changed both pleas to guilty, citing a desire to return to California to appeal the death sentence convictions. On January 7, 2013, Alcala was given a 25-years-to-life sentence for the murders of Crilley and Hover.

In October 2014, a plaque was built in Huntington Beach at Pier Plaza in honor of Robin Samsoe in the form of a memorial. The story of Samsoe's disappearance is written on the plaque, alongside a picture of her face.

== See also ==
- Rodney Alcala
- List of murdered American children
- List of serial killers in the United States

== General cited sources ==
- Sands, Stella (2011). The Dating Game Killer: The True Story of a TV Dating Show, a Violent Sociopath, and a Series of Brutal Murders. Sioux Falls, Minnesota: St. Martin's True Crime. ISBN 978-0-3125-3589-6.
