= Juan Corona =

Mexican serial killer (1934–2019)

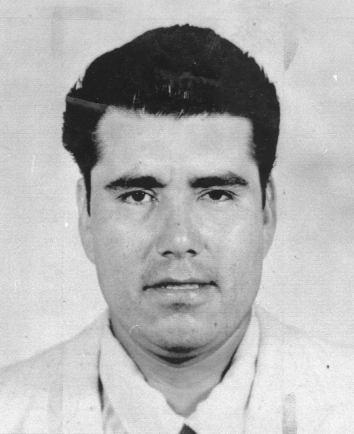
- Police mug shot of Corona, c. 1971
- Born: Juan Vallejo Corona; February 7, 1934; Autlán, Jalisco, Mexico
- Died: March 4, 2019 (aged 85); California, U.S.
- Spouses: Gabriella E. Hermosillo (m. 1953, divorced) Gloria I. Moreno (m. 1958; div. 1974)
- Children: 4
- Conviction: First-degree murder (25 counts)
- Penalty: Life imprisonment

Details
- Victims: 25
- Span of crimes: February 1 – May 21, 1971
- Country: United States
- State: California
- Date apprehended: May 26, 1971

Juan Vallejo Corona (February 7, 1934 – March 4, 2019) was a Mexican serial killer who was convicted of the murders of 25 transient laborers found buried in peach orchards along the Feather River in Sutter County, California, in 1971. Corona was considered the most prolific serial killer in U.S. history until the discovery of Dean Corll's crimes two years later. He remains the most prolific serial killer in the state of California.

Corona was convicted of 25 counts of first-degree murder in 1973. An appellate court overturned the conviction in 1978 on the basis of incompetent legal representation and granted him a new trial. In 1982, he was again found guilty on all counts. He served a life sentence in California State Prison, Corcoran, and died in 2019.

== Early life ==
Juan Corona was born on February 7, 1934 in Autlán, Jalisco, Mexico, as the fifth of ten children to Candida Vallejo and Sebastian Corona. Through Sebastian's first marriage, Juan also had two older half-siblings Guadalupe Corona and José Natividad Corona Sánchez, the latter of whom immigrated to the United States in 1944. In 1950, after finishing two years of high school, Juan illegally entered California at age 16, working as a farm laborer on carrot and melon fields in the Imperial Valley for three months before moving north to the Sacramento Valley. In 1951, he joined Natividad and another older brother, Felix, in their residence outside of Yuba City. In 1952, Juan began working as a construction worker in Sacramento, later becoming employed for the Folsom Dam project.

In May 1953, Juan moved back to Yuba City to live with Natividad, who had become a labor contractor, allowing Juan to work as a foreman to one of Natividad's construction crews. On October 24, 1953, Juan married Gabriella E. Hermosillo, a resident of Sacramento, in a ceremony held in Reno, Nevada, but the marriage ended in divorce three months later over "dissimilar interests".

=== Mental illness and deportation ===
In December 1955, Corona displayed signs of mental illness following the 1955 Yuba–Sutter floods. Corona had a strong fear of water and claimed that the floods had killed everyone in the area, saying he now believed everyone he interacted with since were ghosts. On January 11, 1956, Natividad filed a peititon to the Sutter County Superior Court to order his brother's involuntary commitment and following a brief stay at Sutter County General Hospital, Corona was treated at DeWitt State Hospital in Auburn, California. Staff at DeWitt diagnosed him with schizophrenia, initially determining "paranoid symptoms", which were later revised to "catatonic symptoms". He was released on April 18, 1956, after receiving 23 electroconvulsive therapy sessions before he was declared recovered and released three months later. He was deported to Mexico after the hospital learnt of his immigration status.

=== Return to the US ===
In 1956, a few months after his deportation, Corona re-entered the United States after receiving a green card. He moved back in with Natividad and although their relationship had become strained, the brothers purchased a home in Live Oak. In 1958, Natividad left the labor contracting business to operate a drinking establishment, the Guadalajara Café, in Marysville, and with Natividad's permission, Corona used his brother's labor contract license to work. In 1959, Corona married Gloria I. Moreno, a fellow Mexican immigrant in the US on a green card who later bought Natividad's share of the Live Oak house. Throughout the 1960s, they had four daughters and eventually moved to Yuba City. In 1962, Corona obtained his own labor contract license and in 1966, he started working for the Jack Sullivan Ranch. By 1970, Corona had gained a reputation as a businessman and joined a local charros association. In March 1970, he was again admitted to Dewitt for treatment. In March 1971, he applied for and was denied welfare. Corona was a Catholic and attended St. Isadore's Catholic Church.

In 1970, Natividad attacked a man with a machete-like weapon in Marysville and after losing the lawsuit, fled back to his native Mexico, where he died in 1973 of complications from diabetes and syphilis.

== Evidence ==
On May 19, 1971, a farm owner who had used Corona to contract field workers noticed a freshly dug hole in his peach orchard, which was filled the next day. In the hole was the body of a man who had been stabbed and hacked.

In one grave, deputies found two meat receipts bearing Corona's signature. In another two graves, there were two crumpled Bank of America deposit slips printed with Corona's name and address. This circumstantial evidence supported their case.

Witnesses later told police that some of the victims had been last seen riding in Corona's pickup truck.

In the early morning hours of May 26, 1971, police entered Corona's Yuba City home with a search warrant and arrested him. Evidence indicating his guilt was discovered and seized, such as two bloodstained knives, a machete, a pistol, and blood-stained clothing. There was also a work ledger that contained 34 names and dates, including seven of the known victims. The ledger came to be referred to as a "death list" by the prosecution, who alleged it recorded the dates the men were murdered.

Corona had been supplying workers to the ranches where the victims were discovered. Most of the victims were discovered on the Sullivan Ranch, which had a Bunkhouse where Corona housed many of the men who worked for him.

== Victims ==
All of the victims were middle-aged or elderly men. Most of them were White, though one victim was Black and another a member of the Pit River Tribe.

Victims (charged)
Number	Name	Age	Death Date	Method of Killing
1	John Joseph Haluka	52	February 25 – May 11, 1971	Stabbed/slashed w/ a knife or machete.
2	Sigurd E. "Pete" Beierman	62	February 25 – May 11, 1971	Stabbed/slashed w/ a knife or machete.
3	John Doe (4th victim found)	Unknown	February 25 – May 11, 1971	Stabbed/slashed w/ a knife or machete.
4	John Doe (7th victim found)	Unknown	February 25 – May 11, 1971	Stabbed/slashed w/ a knife or machete.
5	William Emery Kamp	62	February 26 – May 12, 1971	Shot in the head w/ a 9mm.
6	Clarence Hocking	53	February 26 – May 12, 1971	Stabbed/slashed w/ a knife or machete.
7	John Doe (10th victim found)	Unknown	February 26 – May 12, 1971	Stabbed/slashed w/ a knife or machete.
8	John Doe (12th victim found)	Unknown	February 26 – May 12, 1971	Stabbed/slashed w/ a knife or machete.
9	Albert Leon "Scratchy" Hayes	58	February 27 – May 13, 1971	Stabbed/slashed w/ a knife or machete.
10	Warren Jerome Kelley	62	c. March 30, 1971	Stabbed/slashed w/ a knife or machete.
11	John Henry Jackson	64	May 3–14, 1971	Stabbed/slashed w/ a knife or machete.
12	Joseph J. Maczak	54	April 26 – May 21, 1971	Stabbed/slashed w/ a knife or machete.
13	Mark Beverly Shields	56	c. April 28, 1971	Stabbed/slashed w/ a knife or machete.
14	Donald Dale "Red" Smith	60	April 30 – May 11, 1971	Stabbed/slashed w/ a knife or machete.
15	James Wylie Howard	64	May 1–13, 1971	Stabbed/slashed w/ a knife or machete.
16	Sam Bonafiede (a.k.a. Joe Carriveau)	55	c. May 6, 1971	Stabbed/slashed w/ a knife or machete.
17	Edward Martin Cupp	43	May 9–13, 1971	Stabbed/slashed w/ a knife or machete.
18	Charles Levy Fleming	67	c. May 11, 1971	Stabbed/slashed w/ a knife or machete.
19	Jonah Raggio Smallwood	56	c. May 12, 1971	Stabbed/slashed w/ a knife or machete.
20	Elbert J.T. Riley	45	c. May 12, 1971	Stabbed/slashed w/ a knife or machete.
21	Lloyd Wallace Wenztel	60	May 14–22, 1971	Stabbed/slashed w/ a knife or machete.
22	Paul Buel Allen	59	c. May 15, 1971	Stabbed/slashed w/ a knife or machete.
23	Raymond Reand Muchache	47	c. May 18, 1971	Stabbed/slashed w/ a knife or machete.
24	Kenneth Edward Whitacre	40	c. May 19, 1971	Stabbed/slashed w/ a knife or machete.
25	Melford Everett Sample	59	c. May 21, 1971	Stabbed/slashed w/ a knife or machete.

== Legal proceedings ==
Corona was provided legal aid and assigned a public defender, Roy Van den Heuvel, who hired several psychiatrists to perform a psychological evaluation. Although the sheriff, Roy Whiteaker, said the prisoner was in no apparent or immediate danger from his fellow townsmen, Corona was moved to the new and larger county jail in Marysville on May 30, 1971, for "security reasons."

On June 2, Corona was returned to Sutter County for arraignment, which was closed to the media and public. A plea of not guilty was entered, and a date was set for Corona's preliminary hearing.

By the time the search was terminated on June 4, a total of 25 male victims had been discovered. Four of them were unidentified.

On June 14, Van den Heuvel was replaced by Richard Hawk, a privately retained defense attorney. In return for his legal representation, an agreement was made granting Hawk exclusive literary and dramatic property rights to the defendant's life story, including the proceedings against him. Under the agreement, Corona waived the attorney–client privilege. Shortly after taking over the defense, and even before seeing Corona's medical record or reading any of the reports, Hawk decided against having him plead not guilty by reason of insanity and fired the psychiatrists.

Corona complained of chest pain from his cell in Yuba City on June 18 and was taken to the hospital, where he was diagnosed with having had a mild heart attack. The grand jury returned a 25-count murder indictment against him on July 12. In early August, Corona was hospitalized again after complaining of chest pain and saying he had not been able to sleep because of it.

== Trial ==
It took over a year after the murders were discovered for the case against Corona to come to trial. The California Supreme Court voided the death penalty in the state on February 18, 1972, ruling it unconstitutional, cruel, and unusual. Therefore, it would not be a capital case. Hawk succeeded in getting a change of venue from Sutter County to Solano County.

The trial began on September 11, 1972, at the courthouse in Fairfield, California, more than 60 miles (97 km) from Yuba City. Jury selection took several weeks, and the trial took another three months.

Though Corona denied culpability, he was not called to the stand to testify in his own defense, and no defense witnesses were called. The jury deliberated for 45 hours and returned a verdict on January 18, 1973, finding Corona guilty of first-degree murder on all 25 counts charged. The judge, Richard Patton, sentenced Corona to 25 terms of life imprisonment, to run consecutively, without the possibility of parole. Despite being sentenced to so many consecutive terms, the Department of Corrections said that Corona would be eligible for parole in seven years, citing Section 669 of the penal code, which mandates that when a crime is punished by life imprisonment, with or without the possibility of parole, then all other convictions shall be merged and run concurrently.

== Second trial ==
On May 18, 1978, the California Court of Appeal granted Juan Corona a new trial based on his appeal and petition for the writ of habeas corpus filed by his lawyers, Alan Exelrod and Michael Mendelson. The Appeals Court based its decision on two primary issues raised by appellate counsel: first, trial counsel did not do the requisite legal and factual investigations required; and second, trial counsel's obtaining publication rights as part of his fee created an impermissible conflict between trial counsel and Corona.

The second trial began on February 22, 1982, in Hayward, California. Corona's defense posited that the real murderer of the ranch workers was most likely his brother, Natividad Corona, a known homosexual who was accused of attacking Romero Raya with a machete-like weapon at his cafe in Marysville and, after losing the lawsuit Raya filed, had fled back to his native Mexico. Natividad had died in 1973 in Guadalajara.

This time, more than 50 defense witnesses were called to the stand by Terrence Hallinan. Corona was called in his own defense. He was asked only two questions through an interpreter, taking only two minutes. "Do you understand the state has accused you of killing 25 men?" "Yes," Corona answered, almost inaudibly. "Did you have anything to do with killing those men?" "No," Corona replied. Hallinan then turned Corona over to the prosecutor, Ronald Fahey, for cross-examination. Startled prosecution attorneys requested a brief recess to gather their wits and prepare some of the more than 630 exhibits for their cross. Later, Fahey questioned Corona about the various vans and cars he used at the ranch where he worked and lived and where some weapons were found.

The trial lasted seven months. Corona was again convicted of the crimes on September 23, 1982, and returned to prison after the strategy failed to persuade the jury, which deliberated for 54 hours over a two-week period, of his innocence. Afterward, the foreman told the press that the most incriminating piece of evidence against Corona was his work ledger, for which the labor contractor had "no reasonable explanation." He said the jury had dismissed the defense's contention that Natividad committed the murders. "He wasn't in Marysville enough to have committed the bulk of the killings," he said.

== Imprisonment and death ==
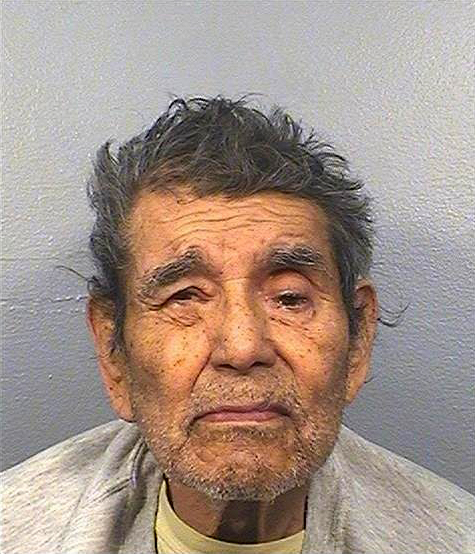
Corona in 2018

Corona was first incarcerated at Vacaville's California Medical Facility, nine miles (14 km) from Fairfield, because of the heart irregularities. In December 1973, he was stabbed 32 times in his cell, lost his left eye, and had a blade permanently lodged behind his right eye because he had bumped into a fellow inmate in a corridor and failed to say "excuse me." Of the five men questioned, including the one involved in the bumping incident, one identified as the bumped man's sexual partner, and three inmates identified as friends of the partner, four were charged with assault with a deadly weapon.

Corona was transferred to Correctional Training Facility (CTF), in Soledad, California. In 1974 his wife filed for divorce, which was granted on July 30. In 1992, Corona was transferred from CTF to Corcoran State Prison. It was reported in 1998 that Corona was suffering from Alzheimer's disease. He was denied parole eight times. During a 2011 parole hearing, Corona admitted to the murders, saying that the victims were "winos" who had been trespassing on his property. However, at a parole hearing in 2016, Corona said he could not recall committing the murders.

On March 4, 2019, Corona died from natural causes at the age of 85, at a hospital near Corcoran State Prison.

== Media and popular culture ==
- In the 1974 film Female Trouble, character Dawn Davenport claims, "I had an affair with Juan Corona!"
- Lyvia's House, (film), Stonecutter Media, 2023. The film's sub-plot references a fictionalised version of the murders.

== See also ==
- List of serial killers in the United States
- List of serial killers by number of victims
