= Horace Van Vaultz =

American serial killer (born 1955)

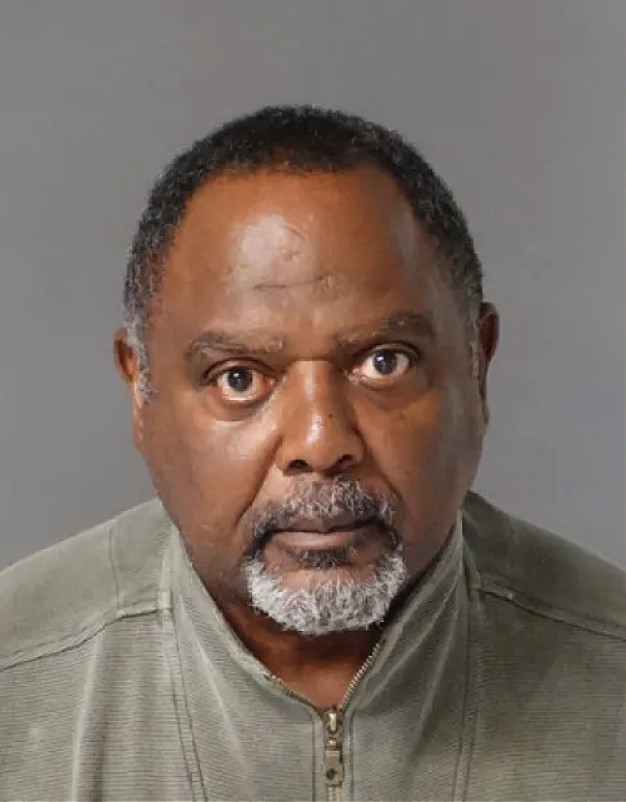
- Mugshot of Vaultz in 2019
- Born: Horace Van Vaultz Jr. May 21, 1955 (age 71)
- Status: Incarcerated
- Conviction: First degree murder with special circumstances (2 counts)
- Penalty: Life imprisonment without parole

Details
- Victims: 3+
- Span of crimes: 1981–1986
- Country: United States
- State: California
- Date apprehended: November 15, 2019
- Imprisoned at: California State Prison, Corcoran

Horace Van Vaultz Jr. (born May 21, 1955) is an American serial killer who raped and killed at least three women in Southern California from 1981 to 1986. Vaultz retained numerous photographs of young girls and women, some of whom police suspect were victims, although he has not been charged with any other murder to date. Several of those who were photographed have been identified and confirmed to still be alive.

Vaultz was arrested in 1987 for the murder of his final victim, 25-year-old Janna Rowe of Ventura, and he was acquitted at trial in 1988; his guilt in her murder would be established in 2019 through DNA evidence, which also linked him to two murders in Montclair and Burbank. He was convicted of two counts of first-degree murder in 2022 and sentenced to life in prison without parole.

== Crimes ==
In 1984, Vaultz was arrested in Huntington Beach for raping and attempting to strangle a 22-year-old woman. He pled no contest to the charge and was given probation.

On May 6, 1987, Vaultz was arrested for the murder of 25-year-old Janna Kathleen Rowe, a Newbury Park waitress who was found strangled to death near the Ventura River on December 27, 1986. Vaultz claimed to have befriended Rowe after she moved to Newbury Park from Utah and had last seen her at a Ventura motel the day before her death. He provided an alibi claiming to have been in Los Angeles the day Rowe was killed; however, he had actually checked in and out of the motel around the time of her death. Vaultz was tried and acquitted of murder in January 1988.

== Photographs ==
A 2019 search of Vaultz's house in Bakersfield revealed a collection of numerous photographs of young women and teenage girls, some of whom police suspect were murdered by Vaultz. Two of the women in the photographs have been identified and confirmed to be still alive.

== Convictions ==
On August 18, 2022, Vaultz was convicted of first degree murder for killing Selena Keough and Mary Duggan. After the jury found special circumstances of rape and sodomy, he was subsequently sentenced to two consecutive terms of life in prison without parole on September 19, 2022. Vaultz maintains that he is innocent.

== See also ==
- Rodney Alcala, another serial killer active in California who retained dozens of photographs of women
- List of serial killers in the United States
