= Brandon Pettit =

American murderer (born 1987)

- Born: Brandon Scott Pettit; October 8, 1987 (age 38)
- Occupation: Unemployed
- Spouse: None
- Parent(s): David and Janet Pettit
- Conviction: Two counts of first-degree murder
- Penalty: Two consecutive life terms without parole

Details
- Imprisoned at: California State Prison, Corcoran

Brandon Scott Pettit (born October 10, 1987) is an American prisoner who was charged with murdering his parents, Janet and David “Scott” Pettit (both 59) in Modesto, California on August 8, 2013. Brandon's friend, Felix Valverde, whom he allegedly hired to commit the murders, was also arrested and charged with murder. He pleaded not guilty and is awaiting trial.

The case was profiled on 48 Hours. On October 19, 2022, Brandon Pettit's conviction was overturned after an appeals court found that his statements to police should not have been admitted at his trial. In February 2023, Felix Valverde pleaded guilty to arson in the first-degree murders of Scott and Janet Pettit.

== Background ==
Scott owned a martial arts studio in Riverbank, California and organized car shows; he was voted “Citizen of the Year” for 2007 by a local paper. Janet was a neonatal nurse who had finished her PhD shortly before her death. They had two children, Lauren and Brandon.

Brandon experienced social difficulties and was diagnosed with Asperger syndrome while he was in high school. He enrolled in the Fire Training Academy at Modesto Junior College in the fall of 2010 and began working as a security guard in May 2011.

== Murder and investigation ==
A 911 call was placed early on August 8, 2013, by a witness who reported seeing flames at the home of David and Janet Pettit. An investigation revealed that David and Janet, both found deceased at the scene, had been shot and that an accelerant was used in their bedroom.

Brandon became a suspect, although he was at work when the crime occurred. Phone records show Brandon spoke to his friend, Felix Valverde, on the night of the murders. A search of Valverde's apartment found wallets belonging to David and Janet Pettit and two sets of keys to their home. Brandon admitted to giving house keys and bullets to Valverde, and giving him money days after the murders, but denied asking Valverde to commit murder.

Multiple people stated that Brandon had told them he wanted his parents dead. In the months leading up to his parents’ murder, Brandon contacted Sarah Wilson, a former high school classmate, claiming his parents were buying him a million-dollar home in Georgia and inviting her to move in with him. Hours before the murders, he sent her a text message saying “You're getting a boob job for Christmas, LOL.”

== Trial ==
Prosecutors argued Pettit murdered his parents for money, hiring Valverde to commit the murders and providing him with house keys and ammunition. The defense argued that there was no physical evidence linking Pettit to the crime scene and that his incriminating statements and behavior could be explained by his diagnosis of Asperger syndrome. In September 2020, he was found guilty on two counts of first-degree murder; in February 2021, he received two consecutive life sentences without parole. On October 19, 2022, the California Court of Appeal reversed Pettit's convictions because of a Miranda violation.
