= Michael Jordan: An American Hero =

Michael Jordan's life

- Screenplay by: Michael J. Murray
- Directed by: Alan Metzger
- Starring: Michael Jace
- Composer: Paul Christian Gordon
- Country of origin: United States
- Original language: English

Production
- Producer: Mike Elliot
- Cinematography: Thomas Callaway
- Editor: Seth Flaum
- Running time: 93 minutes
- Production company: Saban Entertainment

Original release
- Network: Fox Family Channel
- Release: April 18, 1999

Michael Jordan: An American Hero is an American television film that aired on Fox Family Channel on April 18, 1999. It stars Michael Jace as Michael Jordan. Debbie Allen, Ernie Hudson, and Robin Givens also star in the film.

== Plot ==
The opening titles of the film shows footage of Jordan preparing for a game with the Chicago Bulls. The film is mostly based on the life of Michael Jordan from his childhood until when he grew up to be an NBA player. It also highlights the moments of when Michael played baseball as both a child and his short-lived minor league baseball career as well as his knack of golfing. The film ends with Michael in an empty arena after a game and he shoots a basket while flashbacks of his childhood when his father taught him how to shoot appear. The closing titles state that Jordan retired from basketball for good on January 13, 1999. However, he came out of retirement a second time in 2001, two years after the film's release, playing two seasons for the Washington Wizards before retiring for the third and final time.

== Cast ==
- Michael Jace as Michael Jordan
  - Dari Gerard Smith as Michael Jordan (age 6)
  - Cordereau Dye as Michael Jordan (age 12)
  - Thomas Hobson as Michael Jordan (teenager)
- Jascha Washington as Larry Jordan (age 7)
  - Glenndon Chatman as Larry Jordan (age 14)
- Debbie Allen as Deloris Jordan
- Ernie Hudson as James R. Jordan Sr.
- D. Elliott Woods as Leroy
  - Desi Arnez Hines II as Leroy (teenager)
- Brenan T. Baird as Phil Jackson
- Christopher Jacobs as Buzz Peterson
- Robin Givens as Juanita Jordan
- Mark Mathias as Abel Broxton
- John Valdetero as Coach Herring
- Randy J. Goodwin as Ahmad Rashad
- Ed Zajac as Ron Schueler
- Kristine Kelly as Reporter

== See also ==
- List of basketball films
