= Treamelle Taylor =

American gridiron football player (born 1969)

No. 80
- Position: Wide receiver

Personal information
- Born: November 8, 1969 (age 56); Los Angeles, California, U.S.
- Listed height: 5 ft 9 in (1.75 m)
- Listed weight: 179 lb (81 kg)

Career information
- High school: Hawthorne (CA)
- College: Nevada
- NFL draft: 1991: 9th round, 233rd overall pick

Career history
- Tampa Bay Buccaneers (1991)*; Ottawa Rough Riders (1992–1993); Las Vegas Posse (1994)*
- * Offseason or practice squad member only

Treamelle Samuel Taylor (born November 8, 1969) is an American former professional Canadian Football League (CFL) wide receiver/kick returner.

== Early life and college ==
Taylor attended Hawthorne High School in Hawthorne, California, and lettered in football. Hawthorne High School advanced to the CIF Southern Section semi-finals in his junior year. He was first team All L.A. Times during his senior year.

Taylor attended El Camino Junior College in Torrance, California from 1987 to 1989. In 1987, El Camino won the Junior College National Championship. Taylor received honorable mention all-conference as a wide receiver. In 1989, he transferred to the University of Nevada. In 1990, he was a first team All-American (AP) while leading the Big Sky Conference in all-purpose yardage. The University of Nevada advanced to the NCAA Division I-AA Football Championship game in 1990, where they lost to Georgia Southern.

== Professional career ==
In 1991, Taylor was selected by the Tampa Bay Buccaneers in the ninth round (233rd) and released during pre-season. In 1992, Taylor was signed by the Ottawa Rough Riders and nominated for the most outstanding rookie of the Eastern Division while leading the Division in punt return yardage. In 1993, Taylor was placed on the injured reserve list for the entire season with the Ottawa Rough Riders before being released in July In 1994, signed with the Canadian Football League expansion Las Vegas Posse and released during training camp.
