= Bert Sugar =

American boxing writer (1936–2012)

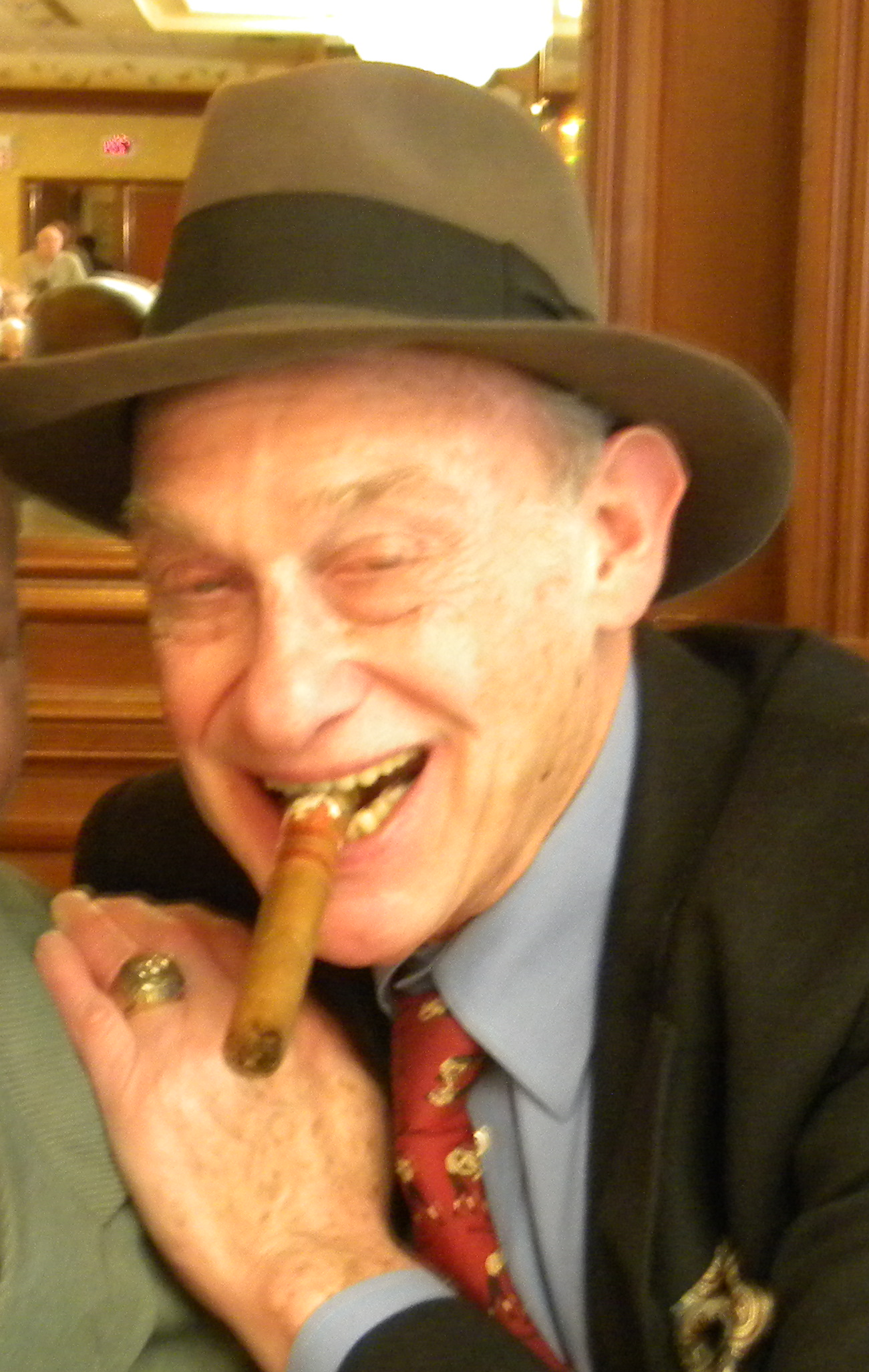
- Sugar in 2010
- Born: Herbert Randolph Sugar; June 7, 1936; Washington, D.C., U.S.
- Died: March 25, 2012 (aged 75); Mount Kisco, New York, U.S.
- Education: University of Maryland (BBA); University of Michigan (MBA, JD)
- Occupation: Sportswriter
- Years active: 1960–2009
- Spouse: Suzanne Davis (m. 1960)
- Children: 2

Herbert Randolph Sugar (June 7, 1936 – March 25, 2012) was an American sportswriter known for his work covering boxing and baseball. As the author of over 80 books, The New York Times called Sugar an "accomplished raconteur with a bottomless sack of anecdotes" who was always seen with his trademark fedora and cigar. He was inducted into the International Boxing Hall of Fame in 2005.

== Early life and education ==
Sugar was born in Washington, D.C., on June 7, 1936. His father was Jewish and he believed that his mother was descended from the Randolph family of Virginia. Sugar graduated from the University of Maryland in 1957 with a Bachelor of Business Administration degree. He then entered the University of Michigan, where he earned MBA and JD degrees while playing rugby and writing for The Michigan Daily. He passed the bar in Washington, D.C. in 1961, but never practiced law.

== Career ==
After passing the bar, Sugar worked in advertising, including for McCann Erickson. His first sports venture was as editor-publisher of Baseball Monthly magazine in 1962, started with the assistance of Detroit Tigers broadcaster Ernie Harwell, whom Sugar met while at the University of Michigan. Sugar bought Boxing Illustrated magazine in 1969 and was editor until 1973. From 1979 to 1983 he was editor and publisher of The Ring magazine.

Sugar wrote more than 80 books, focusing on his favorite sports of boxing and baseball. Among his boxing books are Great Fights, Bert Sugar on Boxing, 100 Years of Boxing, Sting like a Bee (with José Torres), and Boxing's Greatest Fighters. Sugar was ranked as "The Greatest Boxing Writer of the 20th Century" by the International Veterans Boxing Association. He also wrote on other subjects: horse racing, a biography of Harry Houdini, and several books of trivia and statistics. Sugar co-wrote The Complete Idiot's Guide to Pro Wrestling with Lou Albano, published in 1999. In 2009, he published Bert Sugar's Baseball Hall of Fame: A Living History of America's Greatest Game.

Sugar appeared in several films as himself, including Night and the City, The Great White Hype, and Rocky Balboa.

== Personal life and death ==
In 1960, Sugar married Suzanne Davis, a fellow University of Michigan graduate, and they raised a son and a daughter together. Sugar died of a heart attack on March 25, 2012, at Northern Westchester Hospital in Mount Kisco, New York, aged 75. At the time of his death, he had also been suffering from lung cancer.
