= Michael Jace =

American actor and convicted murderer (born 1962)

- Born: July 13, 1962 (age 64); Paterson, New Jersey, U.S.
- Occupation: Actor
- Years active: 1992–2014
- Known for: The Shield
- Spouses: Jennifer Bitterman (m. 1996; div. 2002) April Laune (m. 2003; died 2014)
- Children: 3
- Criminal information
- Status: Incarcerated
- Motive: Marital problems, financial difficulties
- Conviction: Second-degree murder
- Penalty: 40 years to life in prison

Details
- Victims: April Jace
- Country: United States
- State: California
- Weapon: Gun
- Date apprehended: May 20, 2014
- Imprisoned at: Corcoran State Prison

Michael Jace (born July 13, 1962) is an American former actor. He is best known for his role as Los Angeles Police Officer Julien Lowe in the FX drama The Shield from 2002 to 2008.

In 2014, Jace fatally shot his wife, track and field athlete April Jace. He was convicted of second-degree murder and in 2016 was sentenced to 40 years to life in prison.

== Career ==
Jace was born in Paterson, New Jersey. He began his professional acting career in 1992, appearing in an episode of Law & Order. In 1994, he appeared in several TV shows, including Star Trek: Deep Space Nine, and films including Clear and Present Danger and Forrest Gump, where he portrayed the leader of the Black Panthers.

Jace's other film appearances include Strange Days, playing a bodyguard to a corrupt record executive; The Replacements, playing a prison inmate-turned-football player; The Great White Hype, playing boxer Marvin Shabazz; Boogie Nights, playing Jerome; The Fan, playing an arrogant ticket scalper; and Tim Burton's Planet of the Apes remake, playing Major Frank Santos.

Jace's TV appearances include the 1995 HBO TV movie Tyson (as boxer Mitch Green), Cold Case, and the 1999 Fox Family Channel TV movie Michael Jordan: An American Hero (as Jordan).

In 2002, Jace was cast as Officer Julien Lowe on FX's hit show The Shield. He was part of the main cast and appeared in 88 episodes through all seven seasons.

After his role on The Shield, Jace appeared, uncredited, in the film State of Play with Russell Crowe. From 2009 to 2013, he had a small recurring role on the television series Southland.

== Murder conviction ==
Jace was arrested by the Los Angeles Police Department on the evening of May 19, 2014, at his home in Hyde Park, Los Angeles, following a domestic violence report as well as Jace's own 9-1-1 call, in which he stated, "I shot my wife." When police arrived, they found Jace's wife April dead from gunshot wounds, and Jace was arrested on suspicion of murder.

Jace was charged with murder by the Los Angeles County District Attorney's Office on May 22, 2014. On May 31, 2016, Jace was found guilty of second-degree murder and sentenced to 40 years to life in prison, which he is serving at Corcoran State Prison.

== Filmography ==
Year	Title	Role	Notes
1992	Law & Order	Otis Cooke	Episode: "Conspiracy"
1993-2001	NYPD Blue	A.D.A. Vernon Shore / Vernon McGee	2 episodes
1994	Forrest Gump	Black Panther #2	Film debut
1994	Clear and Present Danger	Coast Guardsman #3	
1994	Star Trek: Deep Space Nine	1st Officer, USS Odyssey	
1995	Strange Days	Wade Beemer	
1996	The Great White Hype	Marvin Shabazz	
1996	The Fan	Scalper	
1997	Boogie Nights	Jerome	
1997	Bombshell	Detective Jefferson	
1998	Thick as Thieves	Malcolm	
1999	Michael Jordan: An American Hero	Michael Jordan	TV movie
2000	The Replacements	Wilkinson	
2001	Murder, She Wrote: The Last Free Man	Samuel Pinckney	TV movie
2001	Planet of the Apes	Major Frank Santos	
2002	Scorcher	MacVaughn	
2002–2008	The Shield	Officer Julien Lowe	Main role
2003	Cradle 2 the Grave	Odion	
2005	Fair Game	E	
2006	Gridiron Gang	Mr. Jones	
2009	State of Play	Officer Brown	
2009–2013	Southland	Terrell	4 episodes
2010	CSI: Crime Scene Investigation	Unknown	2 episodes
2010	Rizzoli & Isles	Malcolm Senna	Episode: "Sympathy for the Devil"
2010	Burn Notice	Jeff Taylor	Episode: "Brotherly Love"
2011	Private Practice	Randy Hatcher	Episode: "A Step Too Far"
2011	The Mentalist	Lawrence	Episode: "Rhapsody in Red"
2011	Nikita	Captain Tony Merrick	Episode: "Game Change"
2011	Division III: Football's Finest	Roy Goodwyn	Final film role
