= Hawthorne High School (California) =

Location
- 4859 W. El Segundo Blvd. Hawthorne, California
- Coordinates: 33°55′2.22″N 118°21′47.27″W

Information
- Type: Public
- Motto: Mens sana in corpore sano A sound mind in a sound body
- Established: 1951
- Staff: 80.09 (on an FTE basis)
- Grades: 9-12
- Enrollment: 1685 (2023–2024)
- Student to teacher ratio: 21.04
- Colors: Scarlet and gold
- Athletics conference: CIF Southern Section; Ocean League
- Nickname: Cougars
- Website: http://www.hhscougars.org/

Hawthorne High School is a public high school located in Hawthorne, California, within the Centinela Valley Union High School District. It opened in 1951 with 9th and 10th grades. The first graduating senior class was that of 1954. It is most notable for its association with The Beach Boys, whose original members Brian, Carl, and Dennis Wilson, and Al Jardine attended the school. Coincidentally, Olivia Trinidad Arias, who later became Olivia Harrison (George Harrison’s wife), also attended; she graduated in 1965.

Hawthorne High School is a cross-town rival with Leuzinger High School.

== Notable alumni ==
=== Athletes ===
- Ron Mix, San Diego Chargers and NFL Hall Of Famer
- Scott Laidlaw, running back, Stanford, Dallas Cowboys
- Mike Scott, pitcher New York Mets, Houston Astros (1986 Cy Young Award Winner)
- Curtis Conway, wide receiver, Chicago Bears, San Diego Chargers
- Michael Marsh, 1992 Olympic gold medalist, 200 Meters, 4 x 100 Meter relay; U.S. High School National Record holder in 4 X 400 Meter Relay (3:07:40) on April 6, 1985
- Henry Thomas youth record sprinter; U.S. High School National Record holder in 4 X 400 Meter Relay (3:07:40) on April 6, 1985
- Mark Lee, 70s relief pitcher for the San Diego Padres Major League team
- Cameron Stephenson, offensive lineman for the Green Bay Packers
- Carl Boenish, US Parachuting Association Achievement award winner
- Adimchinobi Echemandu, running back for the Oakland Raiders
- April Jace, 2011 world champion in the women's over-35 4 × 100 meters relay
- Treamelle Taylor, Canadian Football League player
- Mike Colbern, catcher Chicago White Sox
- Gyasi Zardes, soccer forward, Austin FC

=== Musical artists ===
- The Beach Boys - Brian Wilson / Al Jardine / Dennis Wilson / Carl Wilson / David Marks
- Emitt Rhodes multi-instrumentalist singer/songwriter
- John Dust - rapper known as Pigeon John
- Chris Montez
- Jeff McDonald and brother Steve McDonald founding members of Redd Kross
- Greg Hetson of Circle Jerks / Bad Religion
- Tyler Okonma - rapper and musician known as Tyler, the Creator
- Casey Jones - rapper and songwriter known as Casey Veggies
- Omar Banos - singer-songwriter known as Cuco
- Ted Gioia - writer and music critic

=== Other ===
- Olivia Harrison née Olivia Trinidad Arias - widow of Beatle George Harrison (Class of 1965)
- Ted Coombs - world record-breaking roller skater (Class of 1972)
- Brandon Cormell - Comedian

== On-campus violence ==
The school has dealt with issues of race- related as well as gang-related fighting on campus in the past. In March 2007, gang-related fighting during lunchtime resulted in police officers from several law enforcement agencies entering the school with riot helmets and pepper spray. The school was subsequently shut down for the remainder of the day. Other gang-related issues continue to plague the school with sporadic on-campus fighting more recently.
