= The Great White Hype =

1996 film by Reginald Hudlin

- Theatrical release poster
- Directed by: Reginald Hudlin
- Written by: Tony Hendra; Ron Shelton
- Produced by: Fred Berner; Joshua Donen
- Starring: Samuel L. Jackson; Jeff Goldblum; Peter Berg; Jon Lovitz; Corbin Bernsen; Cheech Marin; Jamie Foxx; Damon Wayans
- Cinematography: Ronald Víctor García
- Edited by: Earl Watson
- Music by: Marcus Miller
- Production companies: Fred Berner Films; Altman Entertainment
- Distributed by: 20th Century Fox
- Release date: May 3, 1996
- Running time: 91 minutes
- Country: United States
- Language: English
- Box office: $8 million

The Great White Hype is a 1996 American sports comedy film directed by Reginald Hudlin. It stars Samuel L. Jackson, Peter Berg, Damon Wayans, Jeff Goldblum, Jon Lovitz, Cheech Marin, John Rhys-Davies, Salli Richardson and Jamie Foxx.

The film satirizes racial preferences in boxing, and was inspired by Larry Holmes's 1982 fight with Gerry Cooney (who was known as "The Great White Hope") and Mike Tyson's 1995 return fight vs. Peter McNeeley. Entertainment Weekly called Rev. Fred Sultan (Samuel L. Jackson) a "Don King-clone."

The film was distributed by 20th Century Fox and was released on May 3, 1996.

== Plot ==
James "The Grim Reaper" Roper (Damon Wayans), the undefeated heavyweight boxing champ of the world, defeats his latest challenger with ease and visits an after-party thrown by Rev. Fred Sultan (Samuel L. Jackson), a conniving and manipulative businessman who also acts as Roper's fight promoter. After telling the attendees that the fight was a financial flop, Sultan concludes that boxing events have become far less profitable because audience members are tired of watching only black boxers fight each other. Sultan predicts that a white contender, even one without a viable chance of winning, would create a huge payday like the Larry Holmes vs. Gerry Cooney fight; next, he vows to either find or "create" a white contender for Roper to face in the ring.

After failing to find a white boxer currently in the sport suitable by any means, Sultan discovers that Roper actually lost to a white boxer, Terry Conklin (Peter Berg), back in his amateur days. Sultan and his unethical crew find Conklin in Cleveland, where he fronts a heavy metal band, advocates peace and Buddhism, and constantly preaches progressive social issues. Conklin is uninterested in returning to boxing to face Roper, though he is eventually coaxed to do so through ego-stroking by Sultan and a promise of $10 million to help his quest in eradicating homelessness.

Conklin arrives in Las Vegas and starts to train for his return to the ring. Thanks to shady dealing, Conklin suddenly is named the No. 8 challenger in the world. Boxing pundits and officials easily see the scam unfolding and label the fight a disgrace. However, the prospect of a white vs. black fight continues to hold the prospect of a large payoff. Conklin gets in shape quickly, regaining some of his old form, while Roper dismisses the fight as a joke - to the point where he puts on 25 pounds and is barely able to run after an ice cream truck.

Meanwhile, crusading television journalist Mitchell Kane (Jeff Goldblum) has finally gathered enough evidence to disgrace the unethical Sultan, but at the last moment, Kane is seduced by power and joins Sultan's squad. As Sultan's ego grows, Kane sees an opportunity to usurp his position. Though Conklin was never believed to stand a chance in the fight, Kane recognizes that he may actually win, and has Conklin sign with him rather than Sultan. Throughout all this, the true top contender to the heavyweight title, Marvin Shabazz (Michael Jace), and his trainer Hassan El Ruk'n (Jamie Foxx) are repeatedly denied the rightful chance to a fight, and they proceed to cause a headache for everyone involved in the hype scam.

Sultan and his crew use the media to promote the fight and publicize the white vs. black angle, even fabricating an Irish ancestor for Conklin. The racial angle works, and money starts to pour in. On the fight day, Millions tune into Pay-Per-View on the day of the fight, and Kane is confident about a new era beginning with a Conklin upset. The fight begins, and Conklin and Roper trade several punches and insults with each other, appearing to be evenly matched. Conklin then hits Roper with a strong punch, hurting him and sending him into the ropes. Roper, feeling the effects of his lack of conditioning, knows he must end the fight immediately. He attacks Conklin with a barrage of punches that knocks him to the canvas, ending the fight. Conklin quits boxing again, Kane's plan falls short, Sultan reaps a huge profit, and Roper's critics are silenced. Shabazz, refusing to wait any longer, attacks Roper inside the ring and gets into a fistfight with him, while Sultan screams to not give away something they can sell. Shabazz knocks Roper out, and Sultan steps over Roper's unconscious body and announces that the two boxers will face each other next.

The film ends with Sultan, his crew, Roper and hundreds of attendees and paparazzi celebrating their financial success while Terry walks out of a darkened and empty MGM Grand Garden Arena.

== Cast ==
- Samuel L. Jackson as Rev. Fred Sultan
- Jeff Goldblum as Mitchell Kane
- Damon Wayans as James "The Grim Reaper" Roper
- Peter Berg as "Irish" Terry Conklin
- Corbin Bernsen as Peter Prince
- Jon Lovitz as Sol
- Cheech Marin as Julio Escobar
- John Rhys-Davies as Johnny Windsor
- Susan Gibney as Vivian
- Salli Richardson as Bambi
- Jamie Foxx as Hassan El Ruk'n
- Rocky Carroll as Artemus St. John Saint
- Michael Jace as Marvin Shaabazz
- Bert Sugar as himself
- Art Evans as Minister
- Nedra Volz as Old Lady
- Method Man as himself
- Brian Setzer as himself
- Deezer D as Roper's Crony #2
- Reno Wilson as Roper's Crony #3
- Chi McBride as Rowdy Spectator (uncredited)
- Kevin Grevioux as Security Guard (uncredited)

== Reception ==
On Rotten Tomatoes the film has an approval rating of 42% based on reviews from 24 critics. Audiences surveyed by CinemaScore gave the film a grade C+ on scale of A to F.

Roger Ebert gave the film 2 out of 4 and wrote: "It starts out well, as a wicked satire on professional boxing, and then loses its energy, tires of juggling its characters and ends so abruptly at 91 minutes that it feels like the last reel is missing."

== Soundtrack ==
A soundtrack containing rap music was released on April 30, 1996, by Epic Records. It peaked at 93 on the Billboard 200 and 27 on the Top R&B/Hip-Hop Albums. Camp Lo's single "Coolie High" became a minor hit, peaking at 25 on Rap charts.

== See also ==
- List of boxing films
