= Murder of Cécile Bloch =

1986 child murder in Paris, France

Cécile Bloch
- Disappeared: 5 May 1986; 19th arrondissement, Paris, France
- Died: 5 May 1986; 19th arrondissement, Paris, France

Cécile Bloch was an 11-year-old French girl from the 19th arrondissement of Paris, France, who was murdered by police officer François Vérove. The murder was one of a series in the Paris area from 1986 to 1994 that shocked the city.

In late September 2021, in his suicide note, retired French police officer François Vérove confessed to the 1986 murder as well as to the other Le Grêlé (the pockmarked man) killings. DNA found at the scene linked the murder to two other murders and six rapes.

== Murder ==
Shortly after noon on 5 May 1986, Bloch's mother, Suzanne, called the family's home telephone to make sure that Bloch had made it home for lunch. When Bloch did not answer, Suzanne called her daughter's school and was informed that she had not shown up for class that day. Suzanne and her husband Jean-Pierre alerted the guard at their apartment building and began searching for their daughter.

Bloch's body was found half-naked under a piece of old carpet in the basement. She had been raped before she was strangled and stabbed.

== Investigation ==
Investigators found that Bloch had been strangled and stabbed in the chest. The fact that her body was partially naked and the presence of semen indicated that she had been raped.

Using DNA and descriptions collected from witnesses, police created a facial composite of the serial killer believed to have slain Bloch in 1986. In late September 2021, 59-year-old François Vérove said he was the killer, after authorities began to investigate him in connection to the crimes and was set to provide DNA to the police. He was found dead at seaside resort Le Grau-du-Roi near Montpellier in Occitanie, after committing suicide and leaving behind a suicide note claiming responsibility for the murder and as well as other rapes and murders.
