= California State Prison, Corcoran =

Male-only state prison in California, US

California State Prison, Corcoran (CSP-COR)
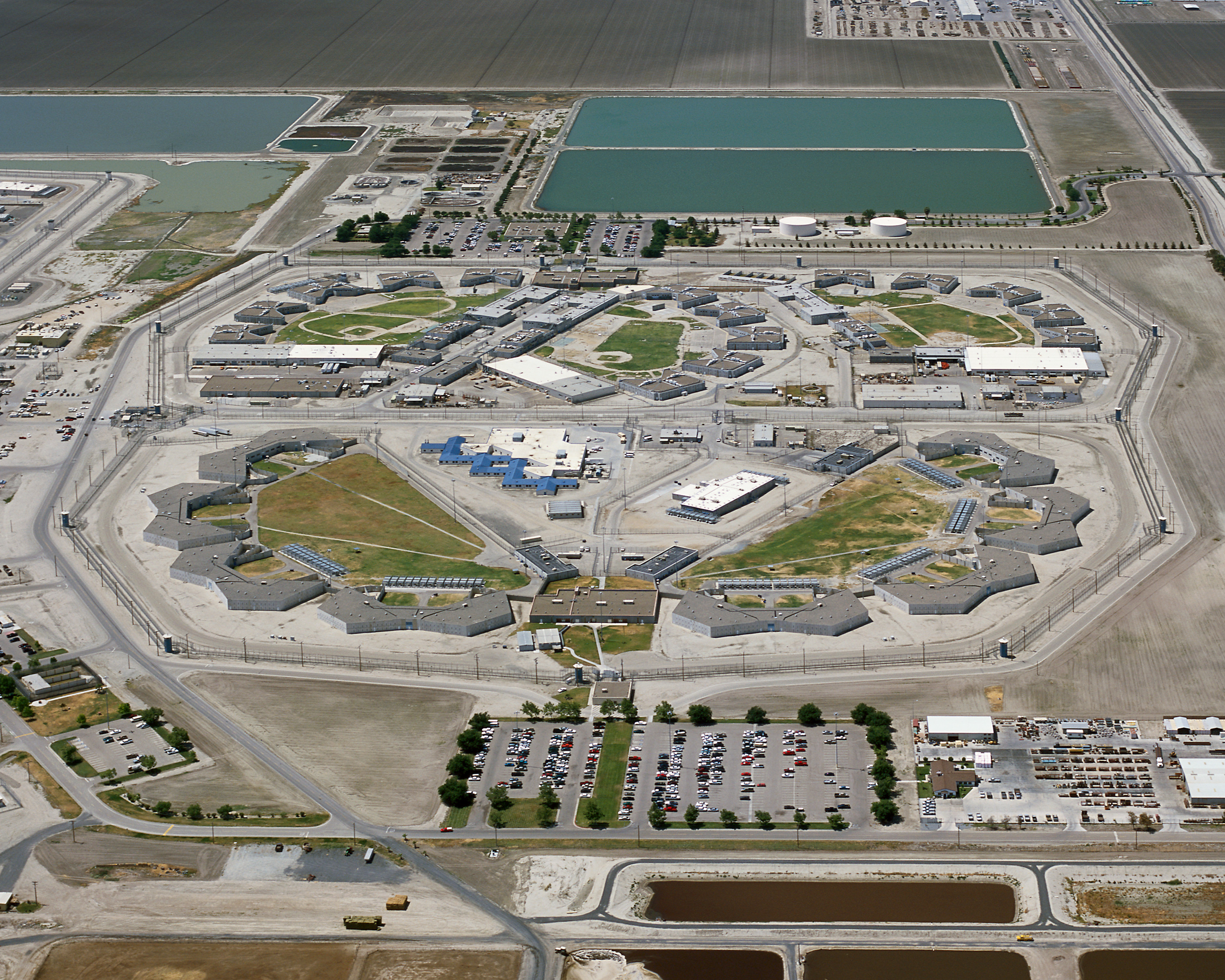
- Interactive map of California State Prison, Corcoran (CSP-COR)
- Location: Corcoran, California; 36.060°N 119.549°W
- Status: Operational
- Security class: Minimum–maximum
- Capacity: 3,115
- Population: 3,445 (115.6% capacity) (January 31, 2023)
- Opened: February 1988
- Managed by: California Department of Corrections and Rehabilitation
- Warden: Tammy L. Campbell

California State Prison, Corcoran (COR) is a male-only state prison located in the city of Corcoran, in Kings County, California. It is also known as Corcoran State Prison, CSP-C, CSP-COR, CSP-Corcoran, and Corcoran I. The facility is just north of the newer California Substance Abuse Treatment Facility and State Prison, Corcoran (Corcoran II).

== Facilities ==
As of Fiscal Year 2002/2003, COR had a total of 1,703 staff and an annual institutional budget of US$115 million. As of April 30, 2020, COR was incarcerating people at 119.4% of its design capacity, with 3,719 occupants.

- Individual cells, fenced perimeters and armed coverage
- Level IV housing: Cells, fenced or walled perimeters, electronic security, more staff and armed officers both inside and outside the installation
- Security Housing Units, "the most secure area[s] within a Level IV prison designed to provide maximum coverage".
- The Protective Housing Unit & Death Row (California State Prison, Corcoran (COR) does not house death row inmates) which holds up to 47 prisoners who require "extraordinary protection from other prisoners". The unit houses inmates whose safety would be endangered by general population housing. The Protective Housing Unit has been described as "strikingly calm" because inmates "don't want to be moved somewhere less guarded". One violent incident occurred in March 1999 when three inmates attacked inmate Juan Corona, inflicting minor injuries, and smashed Charles Manson's guitar. Three other Protective Housing Unit inmates suffered minor injuries.
- Acute care hospital
- Prison Industry Authority

== History ==
Built on what was once Tulare Lake, the facility opened in 1988. The prison hospital was dedicated in October 1993.

In March 1993, at Corcoran, prisoner Wayne Jerome Robertson raped Eddie Dillard, a prisoner about half his size, after the latter was reassigned to his cell. Robertson, who had the nickname "Booty Bandit", testified in 1999 that prison guards set up the attack. Dillard testified in the same trial. After Robertson was assigned to general population at Pelican Bay State Prison, California state senator Tom Hayden stated "It is almost certain that he would be targeted for death."

In August 1996, the Los Angeles Times stated that COR was "the most troubled of the 32 state prisons". At the time, COR officers had shot and killed more inmates "than any prison in the country" in COR's eight years of existence. Seven inmates had been killed, and 50 others seriously wounded. Based on interviews and documents, Arax concluded that many shootings of prisoners were "not justified" and that in some cases "the wrong inmate was killed by mistake". Furthermore, the article alleged that "officers ... and their supervisors staged fights between inmates" during "gladiator days". In November 1996, CBS Evening News broadcast "video footage of an inmate fatally shot by guards" at COR in 1994; this death "spawned a probe by the Federal Bureau of Investigation of alleged inmate abuses by guards".

A March 1997 episode of the CBS News 60 Minutes discussed the 1994 death, "the alleged cover-up and the alarming number of shootings at the prison". The California Department of Corrections issued the results of its own investigation in November 1997, which found "isolated incidents of staff misconduct" but no "'widespread staff conspiracy' to abuse prisoners".

A film titled Maximum Security University, which used prison surveillance tapes showing four 1989–1993 fights "end[ing] when a guard fatally shoots a combatant", was released in February 1998. That month, eight California correctional officers and supervisors were indicted "on federal criminal civil rights charges in connection with inmate fights that occurred at Corcoran State Prison in 1994". After a trial, the eight men were "acquitted of all charges" in June 2000.

As of 1999 California had paid out several large prison brutality settlements for incidents at Corcoran, including $2.2 million to inmate Vincent Tulumis, paralyzed for life in a May 1993 shooting, and $825,000 for the killing of Preston Tate in April 1994.

Subsequently, COR has been featured in at least two episodes of MSNBC's Lockup series: "Inside Corcoran" (first aired as early as 2003) and "Return to Corcoran" (first aired in 2005).

In July 2013, many inmates at COR participated in a state-wide hunger strike protesting the use of solitary confinement. Billy Michael Sell, an inmate in COR who had been participating in the hunger strike, committed suicide by hanging himself while in a Security Housing Unit (SHU). He had been protesting from July 8 to July 21. Sell's death caused significant controversy, as inmate advocates reported that fellow prisoners had heard Sell asking for medical attention for several days before his eventual suicide. His suicide triggered reviews of the circumstances behind his death at the local, state, and federal level; with Amnesty International calling for an independent inquiry into his death, one without ties to the government.

== Notable inmates (current and former) ==
=== Current ===
- Isauro Aguirre — convicted and sentenced to death for torturing and killing 8-year old Gabriel Fernandez. He is currently on death row awaiting execution.
- Frederick Martin Davidson — perpetrator of the 1996 San Diego State University shooting.
- Joseph James DeAngelo — serial killer and serial rapist; received multiple sentences of life without parole in 2020 for 13 murders committed between 1975 and 1986. In protective custody.
- Scott Dyleski — sentenced to 25 years to life for a murder committed at age 16.
- Dana Ewell — a convicted triple murderer, he ordered the murders of his family in 1992. Serving three life sentences and has exhausted his appeals. In protective custody.
- Phillip Garrido — who kidnapped Jaycee Dugard in 1991. He is serving 431 years to life.
- Michael Jace — former actor serving 40 years to life for the 2014 murder of his wife.
- Binh Thai Luc — serving five life sentences for murdering his friend Vincent Lei and four of Lei's family members.
- Mikhail Markhasev — convicted murderer of Ennis Cosby, son of entertainer Bill Cosby. In 1998, he received a sentence of life without parole, plus 10 years.
- Efren Saldivar, serving six life sentences for murdering patients at Adventist Health Glendale.
- Brandon Pettit — convicted of murdering his parents and sentenced to two consecutive terms of life imprisonment without parole.
- David Turpin — sentenced to 25 years to life for holding captive and torturing 12 of his 13 children.
- Horace Van Vaultz — serial killer.
- George Wayne Smith — Convicted of masterminding the May 9th, 1980 Norco Shootout in which Smith and four accomplices robbed a bank in Norco, California and engaged in a 25-mile (40 Km) pursuit with Riverside County Sheriff’s Office, killing one Deputy and wounding eight others. Two of Smith’s accomplices were killed; whereas Smith and two others were sentenced to life without parole.

=== Former ===
- Rodney Alcala — serial killer and sex offender; known as the "Dating Game Killer." He was sentenced to death in 1980, 1986, and 2010. On July 24, 2021, Alcala died from natural causes at a hospital.
- Juan Corona — murdered twenty-five people in 1971. He was transferred to COR from the Correctional Training Facility in 1992. On March 4, 2019, Corona died from natural causes.
- John Albert Gardner III — convicted of murdering Amber Dubois (2009) and Chelsea King (2010). Later moved to Mule Creek State Prison.
- Patrick Kearney — serial killer known as the "Trash Bag Killer". Spent some time here before being moved to another prison.
- Charles Manson — leader of the Manson family. Manson was transferred from San Quentin State Prison to COR in March 1989. On November 19, 2017, Manson died at a Bakersfield hospital, one week after he was taken there for an unspecified illness.
- Joe "Pegleg" Morgan — member of the Mexican Mafia. He was at Pelican Bay State Prison, then was hospitalized at COR from October 1993 until he died a month later.
- Danny Masterson — former actor best known for his role on That '70s Show convicted of rape.
- Gerald Parker — Serial killer known as the Bludgeon Killer. Spent time there for parole violation also admitted to several killings.
- Yenok Ordoyan — Armenian surgeon who was convicted of welfare fraud. He earned the moniker the "King of Welfare", and was released in 2000.
- Sirhan Sirhan — convicted assassin of United States Senator Robert F. Kennedy. Transferred to COR from the Correctional Training Facility in 1992, he lived in COR's Protective Housing Unit until he was moved to a harsher lockdown at COR in 2003. He was denied parole in 2006 and 2011. He was moved to Pleasant Valley State Prison in 2009, but was subsequently moved back to COR and in 2013 he was transferred to Richard J. Donovan Correctional Facility.
- Joseph Son — South Korean mixed martial arts fighter, manager, and actor. He served 7 years to life for rape and torture until he killed a convicted sex offender, Michael Thomas Graham, receiving an additional sentence of 34 years to life. He was transferred to Salinas Valley State Prison in October 2014.
- John Floyd Thomas, Jr. — serial rapist and killer. Currently at California Health Care Facility.

== See also ==
- List of California state prisons
