= François Vérove =

French serial killer

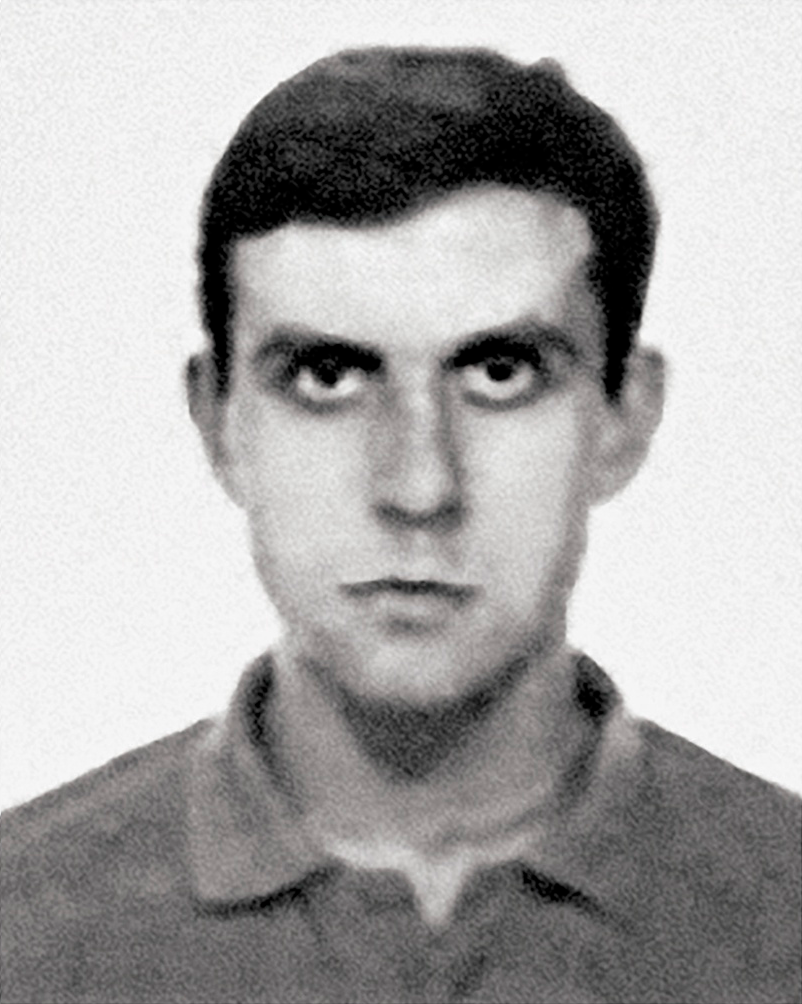
- Vérove in 1983
- Born: 22 January 1962; Gravelines, Nord, France
- Died: 29 September 2021 (aged 59); Le Grau-du-Roi, Gard, France
- Cause of death: Suicide
- Other name: Le Grêlé
- Occupations: Paramilitary gendarme; Police officer; Local councillor

Details
- Victims: 4–6+
- Span of crimes: 5 May 1986 – 6 June 1990
- Country: France
- Location: Île-de-France

François Vérove (French pronunciation: [fʁɑ̃swa veʁɔv]; 22 January 1962 – 29 September 2021), also known as Le Grêlé ([lə ɡʁɛle, ɡʁele], the Pockmarked Man), was a French serial killer, rapist and police officer who murdered at least three people between 1986 and 1994 in the Île-de-France region. He received his nickname from acne scars seen on his face by witnesses following his first murder.

Vérove's first murder, that of 11-year-old Cécile Bloch, took place in the 19th arrondissement of Paris in 1986. The following year he murdered two adults in the 4th arrondissement of the city. He was linked to two further murders in 1991 and 1994, as well as two rapes in 1987 and 1994.

During his crime spree, Vérove belonged to various French police forces; he was a member of the National Gendarmerie between 1983 and 1988, serving as a motorcyclist in the Republican Guard, then became an officer in the National Police in Paris until his retirement in 2019. He briefly held elected office as a municipal councillor in Prades-le-Lez, Hérault, between 2019 and 2020.

On 24 September 2021, Vérove received a police summons to provide a DNA sample as part of an investigation into the Bloch killing. His wife reported him missing on 27 September. Two days later, Vérove killed himself by barbiturate overdose in a rented flat in Le Grau-du-Roi, Gard. He left behind a suicide note in which he confessed to his crimes.

== Early life ==
François Vérove was born on 22 January 1962 in Gravelines, Nord, France, and grew up in nearby Marcq-en-Barœul. An only child, Vérove was raised by his strict father, his stepmother and two half-sisters; his birth mother had died of influenza two weeks before the family moved from Gravelines when he was ten years old. Vérove later confided to a psychiatrist that he had been raped by his father at the same age. Vérove was described by some as a melancholic teenager who had suicidal thoughts, suggesting to one of his friends that they commit suicide together. As a youth, Vérove was said to be a fan of horror films such as Cannibal Holocaust. Vérove married in June 1985.

== Education and career ==
In 1983, Vérove moved to Paris and joined the National Gendarmerie, serving in the motorcycle squadron of the Republican Guard. By 1988 he had switched to the National Police and its jurisdictions in the Paris Police Prefecture, performing his duties in the department of Hauts-de-Seine in the Île-de-France region. Throughout his police career, Vérove participated in trade union activities and was a delegate. He was described by a former friend as "a gentleman to everyone" yet nevertheless could "get angry easily".

During his police career, Vérove lived in Longperrier, Seine-et-Marne, in a house he himself built for his family. He then moved to the south of France, first settling in Port-Saint-Louis-du-Rhône and then in Martigues, both in Bouches-du-Rhône. Following his retirement, Vérove moved to Prades-le-Lez, Hérault, where he was elected as a municipal councillor in 2019. The following year, he moved elsewhere in Hérault to La Grande-Motte, where he resided until close to the time of his death in September 2021. Vérove appeared in 2019 on the show Tout le monde veut prendre sa place on state channel France 2 and told the host that he kept walkers in a Paris park safe.

== Confirmed crimes ==
=== Attempted murder of 13th arrondissement victim (1986) ===
On 7 April 1986, in the 13th arrondissement of Paris, Vérove encountered an 8-year-old girl in an elevator as she was travelling to school. He forcibly dragged the girl to a basement of her apartment building, raped her and attempted to strangle her with a cord. Presumably believing he had killed her, Vérove fled the scene. However, the victim survived the assault and alerted authorities.

=== Murder of Cécile Bloch (1986) ===
Police sketch made by the Paris Police Prefecture of Bloch's killer, including the distinct pockmarks.

Less than a month later, on 5 May 1986, 11-year-old Cécile Bloch was also on her way to school when she encountered Vèrove in the elevator of her apartment building, located at 116 Rue Petit in the 19th arrondissement of Paris. Vérove forcibly took her to a room in the basement of the building, raped her and proceeded to stab and strangle her. Bloch's body was discovered later that day wrapped in a carpet. Witnesses who observed a man at the apartment building, which included Bloch's parents and half-brother, recalled his face being covered in acne scars; this description was included in facial composites of the suspect and led to the French press dubbing him Le Grêlé (the "Pockmarked Man").

=== Murders of Gilles Politi and Irmgard Müller (1987) ===
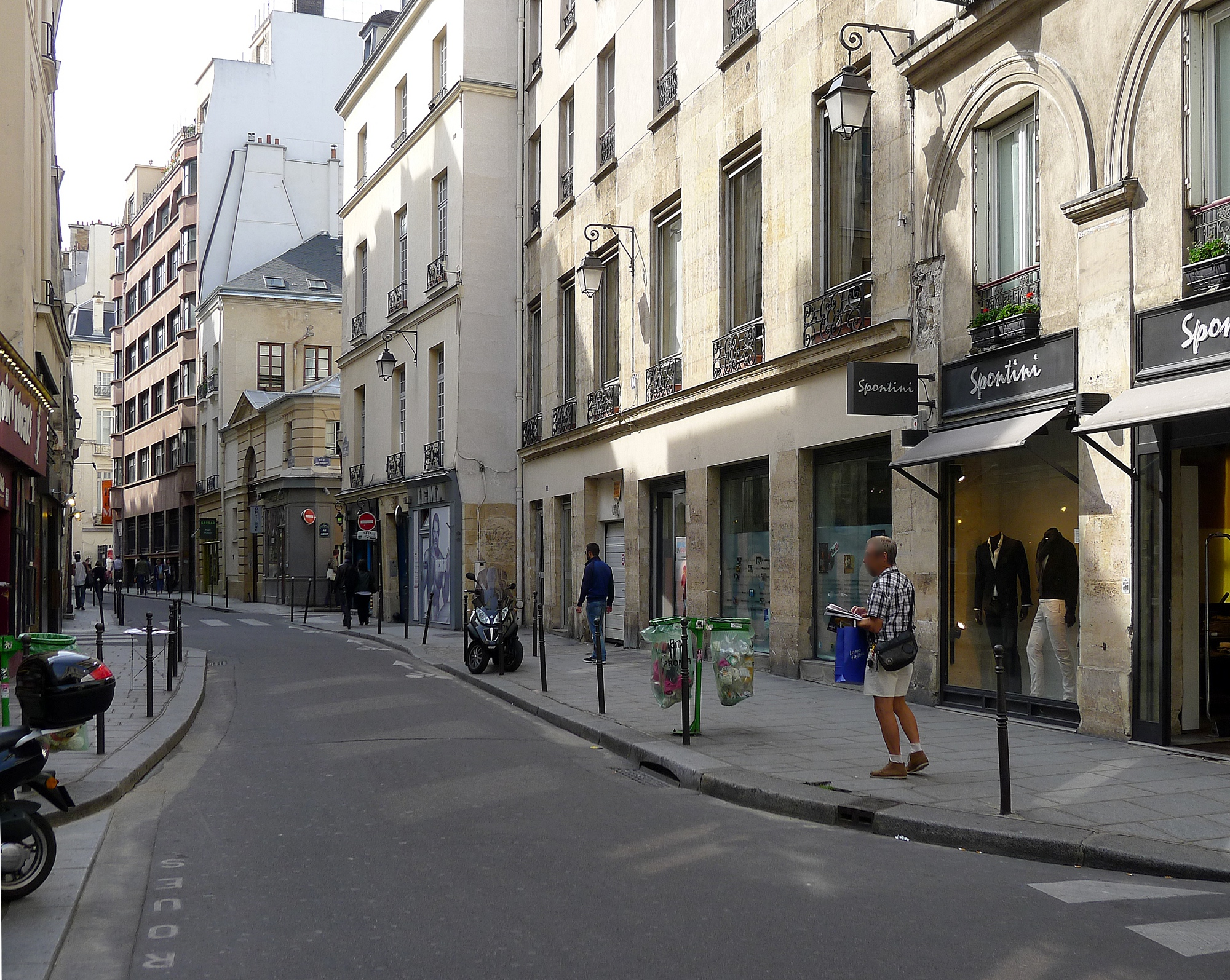
Rue Sainte-Croix-de-la-Bretonnerie, Marais, Paris, the scene of the Politi-Müller double homicide.

Vérove struck again eleven months later, on 28 April 1987, this time targeting two adults. His victims were Gilles Politi, a 38-year-old mechanic for Air France, and Irmgard Müller, a German au pair employed by Politi's family, in an apartment in the Marais district of Paris. Their bodies were discovered together in the apartment. Politi had been stripped naked and forced to lie face down, with his arms and legs bound behind him, and was killed by strangulation with a garrotte; while Müller had been hung by her arms from the upright frame of a bunk bed, her throat slashed with a knife. Both victims had suffered physical torture via cigarette burns prior to death.

Police believed that the killer had been in a personal relationship with Müller. Her contact book included a name, "Élie Lauringe", which did not exist in France's civil registry, leading investigators to believe that the name had been a pseudonym. Witnesses reported seeing an athletic man in his twenties enter Müller's apartment on the Rue de Sévigné on 27 April; he was seen again communicating with Müller through her front-door intercom the following morning, shortly before the killing.

=== Rape of 14th arrondissement victim (1987) ===
On 27 October 1987, a 14-year-old girl returning home from school was stopped by Vérove, who identified himself as a police officer and claimed he needed to question her for an investigation. Once inside her apartment, Vérove handcuffed and raped her. He left his victim alive after burgling the apartment. Although, based on her description, Le Grêlé was suspected to have been the perpetrator, he was not confirmed by DNA analysis to have been such until 1996.

=== Murder of Gilbert Gaudry (1990) ===
On 6 June 1990, Gilbert Gaudry, a 43-year-old industrial draughtsman and design office manager, was tied to a tree and shot in the head with a MAC 50 in a wood in Saint-Aubin (Essonne). His body was found the same day, after his dog had barked in distress. The case, which was quickly forgotten, was not linked to Vérove until November 2024, thanks to the testimony of a retired investigator who noted many similarities with the killer's modus operandi. The bullet found near the body had been fired from a MAC 50, a 9 mm calibre weapon used by gendarmes in service until 1989, one of which was discovered after Vérove's suicide in his house in Le Grau-du-Roi.

In addition to the type of ammunition, the murderer stole the victim's car and chequebook and used them to pay for restaurant meals, a video recorder and a second-hand motorbike. In addition, several shopkeepers told the investigators that he had presented them with a gendarmerie card when making these purchases. The theft of victims and the use of a police or gendarmerie card are recurrent elements in Vérove's criminal career. As a result, ballistics tests were ordered.

In May 2025, the newspaper Le Progrès revealed that the ballistics tests had established that the bullet used to kill Gilbert Gaudry had indeed come from the MAC 50 pistol found in François Vérove's home in La Grande-Motte after his suicide. In January 2026, handwriting analysis established a match between the handwriting on the cheques stolen from the victim and the letter left by Vérove when he took his own life. There is therefore no longer any doubt as to his involvement in the murder of Gilbert Gaudry

=== Rape of "Ingrid G." (1994) ===
After a seven-year lull in activity, Le Grêlé resurfaced in Mitry-Mory, Seine-et-Marne, on 29 June 1994. An 11-year-old girl, identified in reports as "Ingrid G.", was cycling along a high-speed railway line when she was approached by Vérove, who demanded that she enter his car on the pretence of being taken to the police station. Upon being abducted, Ingrid was driven more than an hour away to an abandoned farm at Saclay, Essonne, where she was raped for several hours. Vérove fled the scene without killing Ingrid. Once again, DNA evidence identified Le Grêlé as the culprit.

== Investigation ==
Police investigating the crimes of Le Grêlé realized that their suspect was one of their own. Surviving witnesses recalled the suspect brandishing an official business card from the police or the gendarmes; utilising police equipment such as handcuffs and walkie-talkies; speaking recognisable police jargon; and possessing an extensive knowledge of investigative procedure which he used to escape detection. In the Politi-Müller case, the suspect had given a false address for "Élie Lauringe" which was traced back to a former office in the 13th arrondissement. The final confirmed Le Grêlé attack took place in Saclay, where a gendarmerie training centre was located.

Müller's autopsy determined that, before her death, she had had consensual sex with an unidentified man whose semen was recovered from a tampon. It was not until 2001 that a DNA sample taken from the tampon linked the Politi-Müller case to the murder of Cécile Bloch. Fingerprints were also recovered from cigarette butts found at the Politi-Müller murder scene. Investigators collected DNA evidence from a non-fatal attack in the 14th arrondissement, but that attack wouldn't be conclusively linked to Vérove's other crimes until nine years later. Further forensic evidence was collected in the "Ingrid G." attack, which was soon tied to the earlier cases.

== Death ==
In 2021, Nathalie Turquey, an investigating judge who had taken over the Grêlé case in 2014, requested a summons to be issued 750 gendarmes who had been active in the Île-de-France region at the time of the original crime spree, in which each man was asked to submit a DNA sample. On 24 September 2021, Vérove received his summons via telephone and quickly fled his home in La Grande-Motte; his wife reported him missing on 27 September. Vérove rented an apartment in the coastal commune of Le Grau-du-Roi, where he committed suicide by overdosing on alcohol and barbiturates on 29 September 2021.

Vérove left behind a suicide note, addressed to his wife, in which he admitted to being "a great criminal who committed unforgivable deeds until the end of the 1990s" and claimed to have acted under the influence of "impulses"; he also said that he'd suppressed these impulses when he started his family. Vérove's note claimed that he had "done nothing since 1997", implying he committed other crimes of which the authorities were not yet aware. Two days after Vérove's death, the prosecutor's office in Paris announced that a "DNA comparison [had] established today a match between the DNA profile found at several crime scenes and that of the deceased man".

== Possible victims ==
Vérove is suspected of being the perpetrator of other attacks and crimes. Criminologist Corinne Herrmann has hypothesised that Vérove could potentially be involved in the following murders:

- Sophie Narme (23), an estate agent, was raped and strangled in an apartment she was showing in the 19th arrondissement of Paris on 5 December 1991. In 2022 a different suspect was questioned about the matter. The individual in question was confirmed three years later to be Dominique Pelicot, the notorious serial rapist, who was reinterrogated by investigating magistrates in January 2025.
- Karine Leroy (19), disappeared in Meaux on 9 June 1994; her body was found in a nearby forest a month later.

In August 2024 investigators named three additional murders of which Vérove is suspected:

- Virginie Delmas, a ten-year-old girl, was kidnapped from her place of residence in Neuilly-sur-Marne, in the eastern suburbs of Paris on 9 May 1987. Her body was found five months later in an orchard near Mareuil-lès-Meaux, 30 km to the east. Two of her friends recalled seeing her in the company of a brown-haired man of around 25 who drove a motorcycle, both descriptions matching Vérove.
- Perinne Vigneron, aged seven, was kidnapped on 3 June 1987, less than a month after Virginie Delmas' disappearance, in Bouleurs, just 6 km from where Delmas' body would eventually be found. Five weeks later, Vigneron was found dead in Chelles, 10 km east of the place where Delmas was abducted. Police speculated that the killer lived in the area.

In March 2022, two books about Vérove were published which considered the possibility that Vérove could have killed more victims. According to the authors, investigators on the "Grêlé" affair are working on 31 victims attributable to Vérove, including nine murders.

== See also ==
- The dictionary definition of grêlé at Wiktionary
