= Cesar E. Chavez High School (Delano, California) =

Coordinates: 35.7674°N 119.2209°W

Chavez Collegiate High School

Location
- 800 Browning Road; Delano, California 93215; United States

Information
- Type: Public
- Established: 2003
- School district: Delano Joint Union High School District
- Principal: Justin Derrick
- Teaching staff: 59.03 (FTE)
- Enrollment: 1,351 (2023-2024)
- Student to teacher ratio: 22.89
- Colors: Cardinal Red & Gold
- Mascot: Titan
- Accreditation: Title I Academic Achievement Award
- Website: chavez.djuhsd.org

Chavez Collegiate High School opened in Delano, California in 2003 and serves 1,650 students in grades nine through twelve.

Located at the southern part of the Central San Joaquin Valley, Delano is an agricultural community which straddles the southern end of Tulare County and northern Kern County. Cesar E. Chavez High School serves students residing in Delano as well as the surrounding rural communities and/or districts. These feeder districts include, Earlimart, Pond, Allensworth, Richgrove and Columbine. The School was named after Cesar E. Chavez in his honor. In Houston, Texas has a high school named after the activist also, Chávez High School (Houston).

In 2026, the Delano Joint Union School District's Board of Trustees announced that the school will be renamed to Chavez Collegiate High School.
