= NKSP =

NKSP may refer to:

- Nankang Software Park in Taipei, Taiwan
- North Kern State Prison in California, United States
