= Santa Clarita shooting =

Santa Clarita shooting may refer to:

- Newhall incident (1970)
- 2019 Saugus High School shooting
