= Richgrove Elementary School District =

School district in California, United States

Location
- PO Box 540; Richgrove, California 93261 United States

District information
- Grades: TK–8
- Schools: 1

Other information
- Website: www.richgrove.org

Richgrove Elementary School District is a public school district in Tulare County, California, United States.

It includes Richgrove, Jovista, and Rodriguez Camp. It feeds into the Delano Joint Union High School District.
