= Marketplace at Merced =

- Location: Merced, California, United States
- Coordinates: 37.32096°N 120.48357°W
- Address: 851 West Olive Avenue
- Opened: 1969
- Developer: Hugh Bishop Codding
- Owner: Ethan Conrad Properties
- Num. of stores: 40+
- Num. of anchor tenants: 4
- Floor area: 329,000 square-feet
- Floors: 1
- Website: www.marketplaceatmerced.com

Marketplace at Merced (formerly Merced Mall) is an enclosed shopping mall in Merced, California, United States. Originally opened in 1969, the mall serves as the primary regional shopping destination for Merced County and the surrounding area. The shopping center was renamed Marketplace at Merced following a major redevelopment and rebranding initiative.

The mall features a mix of national retailers, restaurants, and service businesses. Current anchor tenants include Target, JCPenney, Kohl's, and Vallarta Supermarkets. Junior anchors include Crunch Fitness, Boot Barn, and Burlington.

== History ==
Construction of Merced Mall began around the mid-1960s as part of the expansion of retail development on the northern side of Merced. The enclosed shopping center officially opened in 1977 with several department store anchors and several specialty retailers. Sears and J. J. Newberry were the original anchors when the Mall first opened. Department store chain Mervyn's later opened in the former Britt's location.

Throughout the 1980s and 1990s, the mall continued to expand its tenant mix while also remaining one of the main retail centers in Merced County. Target was later built as a standalone big-box store on the northwest corner of the mall lot.

Like many regional malls in the United States, Merced Mall experienced increasing vacancies during the 2010s as department stores closed nationwide and consumer shopping habits shifted toward e-commerce and open-air shopping centers. Mervyn's closed its store in 2008, being replaced shortly after which Kohl's. Several coursed followed including Blockbuster, Work World moving locations, and Hometown Buffet closing. In 2017, Sears announced it would be closing its location at the Mall leaving the space vacant and contributing to a decline in foot traffic at the center.

In 2008, CVS Pharmacy opened at the mall in the former Longs Drugs location, serving as a junior anchor near the center court area. The store later relocated to a standalone building outside the mall property.

In June 2024, Ethan Conrad Properties acquired the main portion of the mall from longtime owner Codding Enterprises. Following the acquisition, the property was rebranded as Marketplace at Merced, reflecting a transition from a traditional enclosed mall into a mixed retail destination featuring both interior mall tenants and exterior-facing stores.

Following the acquisition, the property has since undergone a substantial redevelopment under new ownership. The renovation included updated façades, new landscaping, improved common areas, exterior renovations, and recruitment of new national retailers.

Several new retailers opened in the former Sears building as part of the redevelopment, including Burlington, Petco, Ulta Beauty, Five Below, Rack Room Shoes, Carter's, Mattress Firm, Bath & Body Works, and Tillys.

In late 2025 and 2026, additional national retailers joined the center’s lineup, including Boot Barn and Vallarta Supermarkets.

Announced in 2025, a new Raising Cane's drive-thru pad is also planned in the mall’s parking lot.

== Redevelopment ==
During the 2020s, Marketplace at Merced underwent a series of capital improvements intended to modernize the property. Renovations included updated entrances, tenant improvements, new exterior branding, façade modernization, and leasing efforts aimed at replacing vacant department store spaces.

The redevelopment also introduced additional restaurants, and national retailers, transforming the center into a mixed use regional shopping center.

== See also ==
- List of shopping malls in California
- List of shopping malls in the United States
- Regional mall
- Shopping center
