= Jovista, California =

- Unincorporated community Census-designated place
- Location within California Location within the United States
- Coordinates: 35°47′38″N 119°11′22″W
- Country: United States
- State: California
- County: Tulare

Area
  - Total: 0.10 sq mi (0.26 km^{2})
  - Land: 0.10 sq mi (0.26 km^{2})
  - Water: 0 sq mi (0.0 km^{2})
- Elevation: 395 ft (120 m)

Population (2020)
  - Total: 41
- Time zone: UTC-8 (Pacific (PST))
  - Summer (DST): UTC-7 (PDT)
- ZIP Code: 93215 (Delano)
- Area code: 559
- FIPS code: 06-37568
- GNIS feature ID: 2805908

Jovista is an unincorporated community and census-designated place (CDP) in Tulare County, California, United States. It is on the southern border of the county, 5 miles (8 km) northeast of Delano, a city in Kern County. Jovista was first listed as a CDP prior to the 2020 census. It had a population of 41 at the 2020 census.

== Demographics ==
Historical population
Census	Pop.	Note	%±
2020	41		—
U.S. Decennial Census; 1850–1870 1880-1890; 1900 1910 1920; 1930 1940 1950; 1960 1970 1980; 1990 2000 2010; 2020

Jovista first appeared as a census designated place in the 2020 U.S. census.

=== 2020 Census ===
Jovista CDP, California – Racial and ethnic composition Note: the US Census treats Hispanic/Latino as an ethnic category. This table excludes Latinos from the racial categories and assigns them to a separate category. Hispanics/Latinos may be of any race.
Race / Ethnicity (NH = Non-Hispanic)	Pop 2020	% 2020
White alone (NH)	1	2.44%
Black or African American alone (NH)	0	0.00%
Native American or Alaska Native alone (NH)	0	0.00%
Asian alone (NH)	0	0.00%
Pacific Islander alone (NH)	0	0.00%
Other race alone (NH)	0	0.00%
Mixed race or Multiracial (NH)	0	0.00%
Hispanic or Latino (any race)	40	97.56%
Total	41	100.00%

== Education ==
Jovista is served by the Richgrove Elementary School District and the Delano Joint Union High School District.
