= Ramon Escobar (serial killer) =

Salvadoran serial killer

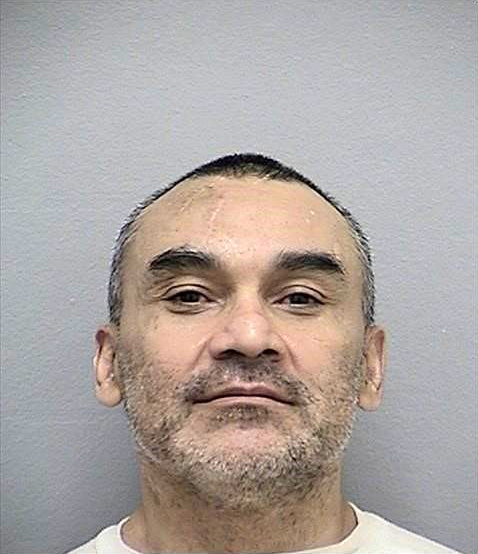
- Born: Ramon Alberto Escobar; June 5, 1971 (age 55); El Salvador
- Convictions: California; First degree murder with special circumstances (3 counts); Attempted second degree murder (7 counts); Texas; Capital murder
- Penalty: Multiple consecutive and concurrent life sentences without parole

Details
- Victims: 7–8
- Span of crimes: August 26 – September 24, 2018; 2023 (accused)
- Country: United States
- States: Texas and California
- Date apprehended: September 24, 2018
- Imprisoned at: California State Prison, Sacramento, Represa, California

Ramon Alberto Escobar (born June 5, 1971) is a Salvadoran serial killer who killed seven people during a month-long killing spree between Texas and California in 2018, most of whom were homeless. After pleading guilty, he was convicted and sentenced to life imprisonment, committing a suspected eighth murder while in prison in 2023.

His crimes caused debate over several issues, mostly concerning illegal immigration and violence committed against the homeless.

== Early life and crimes ==
Escobar was born on June 5, 1971, in El Salvador, where he spent his childhood and youth in poverty as a result of the Football War. In the mid-1980s, Escobar illegally emigrated to the United States, but was arrested in early 1988 and thereafter deported by ICE officers in February of that year. In the early 1990s, he returned to the USA again, settling in the home of some relatives in Houston. From 1992 until his arrest in 2018, Escobar was repeatedly arrested on charges ranging from burglary, assault and criminal trespassing.

From 1995 to 2000, he was incarcerated in a Texas prison for theft before being deported back to El Salvador. The following year, he once again returned but was rearrested in November for a minor offense and illegal entry, for which he was convicted and sentenced to 23 months imprisonment. While serving his sentence, Escobar was diagnosed with schizophrenia and transferred to the Harris County Psychiatric Center, where he remained for several months. In total, from the period of 1997 to 2011, Escobar was deported from the United States a total of six times.

In 2012, Escobar made another attempt to enter the U.S., but was caught by border security in Brownsville. While in the county jail, he began to show signs of mental instability, due to which he was interned at a psychiatric hospital in Springfield, Missouri. After the treatment was complete, Escobar was extradited to Brownsville and put on trial. In October 2013, he was convicted and sentenced to two years imprisonment.

After serving the sentence, he was deported yet again but returned soon afterward. He then moved into his uncle and aunt's house in Houston, where he found work as a day laborer, but occasionally supplemented his income with petty thefts. In November 2017 and February 2018, he was arrested twice more for trespassing and theft but was not brought to trial and got away with paying a fine. Despite his repeated criminal behavior, Escobar was not known as a violent individual and most of his friends and acquaintances spoke positively of him.

== Murders ==
=== Texas killings and flight ===
The murders began on August 26, 2018, when Escobar beat to death his 65-year-old uncle, Rogelio, with a police baton at his house in Houston. After the murder, he did not take measures to cover up the crime, but only disposed of his uncle's corpse. He then left Rogelio's backpack, shoes, and shirt on the porch of the house, which aroused the suspicion of his aunt, 60-year-old Dina. Two days later, she started searching for her brother, but before the trip, Escobar snuck inside her minivan. During a car stop in a suburb of Houston, he attacked Dina and subsequently strangled her.

Following the murders, Escobar dumped his relatives' bodies in two separate dumpsters, with their skeletal remains being found two months later in a landfill. He then stole his aunt's van and traveled to Galveston, where he left it at a beach and set it on fire to cover-up his crimes.

Several acquaintances of Rogelio and Dina Escobar contacted the police after their disappearances, as a result of which Ramon was detained for interrogation on August 30. However, as authorities had no evidence to charge him with any crime at the time, he was released. Soon after, Escobar fled the state and drove with his 2004 Honda CR-V to California. Over the next few weeks, he lived in various homeless encampments around Los Angeles, blending in with local transients and drifters.

=== Serial murders ===
In the early hours of September 8, Escobar attacked another homeless man while he was sleeping on a beach in Santa Monica. Despite being repeatedly beaten with a baseball bat and sustaining severe head injuries, the victim survived the assault. Two days later, Escobar attacked another homeless man, 51-year-old Juan Antonio Ramirez, who also suffered a head injury. However, unlike the previous victim, Ramirez fell into a coma and subsequently died in January 2021.

During the early morning hours of September 16, Escobar attacked three sleeping homeless men in Downtown Los Angeles with his baseball bat, robbing them afterwards. Two of the men, 24-year-old Branden Ridout and 59-year-old Kelvin Williams, died, while the third victim, 23-year-old Tievon Harmon, survived. At the time of the murders, Escobar was recorded by the CCTV of a nearby building, which enabled law enforcement to make a facial composite of him. In it, the then-unknown assailant was described as a white or Hispanic male in his 30s or 40s, of average build and height and with medium-length black hair. One notable feature was that he apparently had a noticeable gait due to the curvature of his legs.

On September 20, Escobar carried out another attack under the Santa Monica Pier, during which he beat to death 39-year-old Steven Ray Cruze Jr. Unlike previous victims, Cruze was not homeless and lived with his parents in San Gabriel. According to family members, he had gone to Santa Monica to fish and had apparently decided to spend the night there. In the aftermath of the murder, police were unable to locate any witnesses to the crime.

Four days later, Escobar attacked 63-year-old Jorge Martinez on a street in Downtown Los Angeles, beating him on the head with a baseball bat. The incident had several witnesses who reported it to the police, resulting in Martinez being driven to a local hospital. However, he slipped into a coma and died on September 30.

== Arrest and investigation ==
Mere minutes after the assault on Martinez, Escobar was caught by police officers. After his arrest, police searched the interior of his car, where they found the baseball bat and a pair of bolt cutters. As Escobar heavily resembled the facial composite of the man wanted in other murders, he was subsequently named the prime suspect. Not long after, investigators from Houston also announced that he was suspected in the murders of his uncle and aunt, whose remains had been found in a landfill outside the city.

In early October, the Los Angeles County District Attorney's Office charged Escobar with four counts of murder, five counts of attempted murder and four counts of robbery. Further investigation revealed that he was responsible for many other attacks, with his victims suffering from various degrees of injury. They were the following:

- Albert Gene Scott, on September 11. Unlike other victims, he was not homeless
- Michelle Matice, on the outskirts of MacArthur Park on September 15.
- Kyla Renard and David Dotson, in Griffith Park on September 9.

On November 8, Escobar was formally charged with the murders and the remaining charges, to which he pleaded not guilty.

In December 2018, Escobar, who was detained at the Los Angeles County Jail, was visited by investigators from the Houston Homicide Unit. During his conversation with them, Escobar confessed to killing his aunt and uncle and described what had transpired. As a result, he was subsequently charged with their murders as well.

In mid-2019, Escobar's attorneys filed a motion for a psychiatric evaluation, which the court granted. In September, the minor son of Cruze filed a lawsuit against the city of Los Angeles citing negligence regarding his father's death. On October 17 of that year, Escobar was judged to be sane and thus eligible to stand trial.

== Trial ==
Due to several delays caused by the COVID-19 pandemic, Escobar's trial was delayed until early 2022. During said trial, he was offered a plea bargain from the attorney's office: in exchange for the state dropping the death penalty, he would plead guilty to all charges and be sentenced to several life terms without parole. Escobar accepted, and on May 6, 2022, his sentence was subsequently handed down.

Escobar claimed that he had committed the murders out of personal animosity and financial hardship. When it came to the murder of his uncle, he claimed it was the result of an argument during which Rogelio belittled him for his lifestyle.

== Prison murder ==
After his conviction, Escobar was moved to the North Kern State Prison in Delano to serve out his sentence. He shared a cell with 53-year-old Juan Villanueva, who was serving a life sentence for aggravated sexual assault of a minor. On February 24, 2023, Villanueva was found unresponsive in his cell, and was pronounced dead a short time later. In May 2023, Villanueva's cause of death was revealed to be ligature strangulation, and Escobar awaits prosecution for the murder.

In September 2023, court documents revealed that Escobar had left a note in his cell outlining why he had decided to kill his cellmate. According to the note, he strangled Villanueva because of his poor hygiene, refusal to move out and because he "didn't want to take [Escobar] seriously". Escobar also stated that the entire ordeal lasted five minutes.

== See also ==
- List of serial killers in the United States
