= Vallarta =

Vallarta may refer to:

- Puerto Vallarta, the full name of a city in Jalisco, Mexico
- Nuevo Vallarta, a planned residential-resort community in the state of Nayarit, Mexico
- Ignacio Vallarta, Mexican jurist and governor of Jalisco, Mexico (1872–1876)
- Vallarta Supermarkets, U.S.A.
