= Steven Dean Gordon =

American serial killer on death row

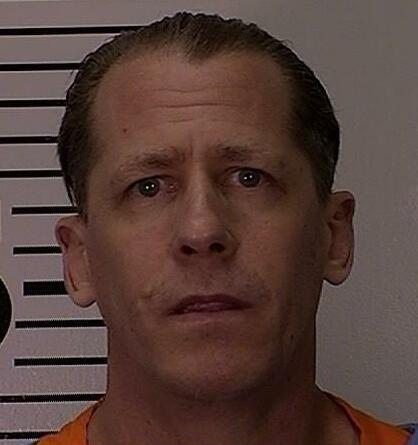
- Born: February 3, 1969 (age 57); Lynwood, California, U.S.
- Convictions: First degree murder with special circumstances (4 counts); Kidnapping; Lewd and lascivious acts on a child
- Penalty: Death

Details
- Victims: 4–5
- Span of crimes: 2013–2014
- Country: United States
- State: California
- Date apprehended: April 11, 2014
- Imprisoned at: California State Prison, Sacramento, Folsom, California

Steven Dean Gordon (born February 3, 1969) is an American serial killer and sex offender who, together with accomplice Franc Cano, killed at least four sex workers in Santa Ana and Anaheim, California from 2013 to 2014. Convicted and sentenced to death for his crimes, Gordon admitted responsibility for at least one further murder, with which he has never been charged.

== Early life ==
Steven Dean Gordon was born on February 3, 1969, in Lynwood, California, but his family moved to Norwalk shortly after his birth. He spent most of his childhood and youth in poverty, and due to some health problems, Gordon had to skip one year of school. While at school, he was considered unpopular and occasionally bullied due to his short stature, which led him to develop an overtly aggressive demeanor and a Napoleon complex.

After graduating from Santa Fe High School in 1988, the 19-year-old Gordon did not pursue further education and instead found work at Disneyland. While working there, he was employed as a handyman who tended to the fast food restaurants located within the amusement park. During this period, Gordon met Lanai Lewis, a fellow employee with whom he would start a relationship. He was regarded by the local community for his love for softball, so much so that he began competing as a core member for the local Walt Disney Parks and Resorts team in the early 1990s.

=== Legal troubles ===
In 1992, Gordon's sister accused him of sexually abusing her son, for which he would subsequently be charged with molestation of a minor. While he initially pleaded guilty to the charge, he later retracted it, which resulted in a guilty verdict and a sentence of 15 months imprisonment. Gordon insisted on his innocence, claiming that he had only pleaded guilty because his girlfriend threatened to break up with him if he didn't, and that his sister had made the accusation up.

After being released from prison the following year, Gordon decided to refrain from committing any criminal acts and live a law-abiding lifestyle. On February 22, 1995, he married Lewis, who gave birth to their daughter, Kayla, two years later. In order to provide for his family, Gordon worked two separate jobs: one as a mailman for the Orange County Register during the night shift, and another as a car washer at an auto repair shop in Anaheim during the day shift.

In the late 1990s, the family moved to a new house in Riverside. While he is not known to have committed any crimes during this period, Lewis claimed that his behavior turned for the worse due to financial and domestic problems. According to her testimony, Gordon became easily irritable, got angry at the smallest inconvenience, threatened to commit suicide and even hire a hitman in order to get himself killed for a life insurance policy. In 2001, she took their four-year-old daughter, left Gordon and filed for divorce. In the aftermath of the trial, Gordon was prohibited from approaching both his ex-wife and daughter as a protective measure.

A few months after the divorce proceedings, Gordon made several attempts to rekindle his relationship with Lewis, but was denied each time. In August 2001, he changed the license plates of his car and repainted it in turquoise, then walked unnoticed to a church in Riverside, where his ex-wife and daughter were. He lured his daughter into his car with the promise of giving her candy, then threatened Lewis with a stun gun and forced her inside. After tying up and gagging her, Gordon drove out of the state to Nevada. A few days later, Lewis managed to lower his guard by pretending to forgive him, whereupon he allowed her to call her parents. Upon learning of her whereabouts, Lewis' parents informed the authorities, who located them and arrested Gordon. He was subsequently charged with two counts of kidnapping, with one charge of rape supposedly committed against his wife being dropped due to lack of evidence. In April 2002, Gordon was found guilty on all counts and sentenced to 10 years imprisonment.

Gordon was paroled in February 2010, but was forbidden from approaching his family or places where children gathered, and had to wear an ankle bracelet monitor. After his release, Gordon contacted Ian Pummell, his supervisor, and using the fact that they were friendly during his incarceration, he was offered a job at a local auto shop. Whilst working there, Gordon met 23-year-old Franc Cano.

=== Meeting Franc Cano ===
Cano, a native of Compton, was born on July 22, 1986. Like Gordon, he grew up in an impoverished household and suffered from health issues such as chronic asthma and eczema as a child. Due to this, he was frequently bullied by other children in the neighborhood, who spread rumors that he had HIV. In 1994, his family moved to a trailer park in Garden Grove.

In 2006, Cano was caught molesting his nine-year-old niece during a visit to his relatives' house to play video games, after which they called the police. According to police reports, when questioned, he told the officers that he was sexually frustrated because he was a virgin and was unpopular with girls. The following year, he pleaded guilty to one count of child sexual abuse and received a 2-year prison sentence. After serving 16 months, Cano was paroled in October 2009, and like Gordon, was prohibited from approaching both his relatives and children and had to wear an ankle bracelet monitor. Owing to these circumstances, he moved into a motel in Anaheim, with his parents paying his rent.

Despite their age difference, Gordon and Cano soon became close friends. As he had issues finding a place to live, Gordon resorted to sleeping in his Toyota 4Runner, and after learning that his new friend had the same issue, he invited him to sleep in the car as well. Being unemployed, Cano often visited the auto shop where Gordon worked and shared his lunch, which was brought to him daily by his parents. Some of Gordon's co-workers suspected that the pair were in an intimate relationship, but Gordon denied it, insisting that they were just close friends.

In 2010, the pair cut off their ankle bracelets and fled to Alabama, where they were quickly caught by federal agents. They repeated this tactic again in 2012, before boarding a Greyhound bus bound for Las Vegas, where they spent the following two weeks relaxing and having fun at the Circus Circus casino. On May 8, they were tracked down and arrested for a parole violation, with Cano being sentenced to 10 months in federal prison while Gordon was sentenced to eight in state prison. Upon being released the following year, Gordon and Cano began to spend more time together, and as they were now left jobless and homeless, began to travel around.

== Exposure ==
On April 11, 2014, Gordon and Cano were arrested in Anaheim on murder charges. This stemmed from an investigation launched on March 14 of that year, after local police received a call from a recycling center whose employees had discovered the body of a woman among a pile of trash on a conveyor belt. The victim was identified as 21-year-old Jarrae Nykkole Estepp, a sex worker from Oklahoma City who had arrived in the state just days prior. Not long after, investigators from Santa Ana contacted their colleagues in Anaheim and launched a joint investigation into the disappearances of three other women: 34-year-old Josephine Monique Vargas (last seen October 24, 2013), 28-year-old Martha Anaya (last seen November 12, 2013) and 20-year-old Las Vegas native Kianna Rae Jackson (last seen October 6, 2013).

During the investigation, police examined a number of items found on the conveyor belt near Estepp's corpse, which had allegedly been dumped with her into a dumpster. Fingerprints were found on a used can of foam, and an examination determined that it belonged to a resident of Anaheim who worked as a plastic window installer. On the day Estepp's corpse was supposedly dumped inside, the man was installing windows on a storefront next to the auto shop where Steven Gordon worked. While reviewing a database of sex offenders with ankle bracelet monitors, the investigators learned that both Gordon and Cano were at each respective location when each respective victim disappeared, which included the dumpster. Based on this and data provided by the cell phone signals from the missing women's devices, both men were arrested, but denied responsibility. Not long after, investigators from Anaheim and Santa Ana organized searches to find the bodies of Vargas, Anaya and Jackson, which were thought to have been dumped in that same dumpster, but they proved unsuccessful. To this day, their bodies have not been located.

In late April 2014, during an interrogation that lasted more than 13 hours, Gordon confessed to committing five murders, but as he could not remember the fifth victim's name, her identity could not be established. According to his testimony, he began luring to his car in October 2013, with Cano sitting in the back seat. During the trip, he would drive to a vacant lot near the auto shop, where he and Cano would sexually assault the victim before strangling her. Initially, he provided investigators with two different versions of how things had transpired: in the first one, he insisted that he premeditated the killings and that Cano had minimal involvement, as he did not know what would happen once they got into the car.

In his second version, however, Gordon claimed that Cano was actually an active accomplice and knew what he was doing. This time, he told investigators that the pair would stalk various areas in Santa Ana and Anaheim in search of sex workers, then analyzed methods to successfully kidnap and kill them. He admitted that Jackson was their first victim, and that they had picked her up from Harbor Boulevard in Costa Mesa on October 6, 2013. Supposedly, Cano hid in the back seat, and when she entered the car, he held her at gunpoint and allowed Gordon to drive to the vacant lot. There, Gordon proceeded to rape Jackson, but after she noticed that they were wearing ankle bracelet monitors, they jointly decided to kill her.

Gordon claimed that in order to cover-up their crime, they stripped Jackson's body naked and thoroughly washed it before destroying her clothing and personal items. Afterwards, the pair targeted Josephine Vargas - in this case, Gordon insisted that Cano was the direct instigator, as Vargas did not like Gordon, who allegedly attempted to dissuade his friend from harming her. They then attempted to lure in their third victim, Martha Anaya, on two different occasions, but were denied both times, which greatly angered Gordon. He claimed that after they finally convinced her to get in, an altercation arose between them that resulted in both him and Cano strangling her. Gordon said that Anaya, who fought fiercely against them, almost managed to escape the car during the scuffle.

When it came to their last victim, Jarrae Estepp, Gordon said that he initially had no plans to kill her, as he had taken quite a liking to her. According to his testimony, he attempted to convince her to quit sex work and become his roommate, but she refused. An argument then occurred between them, during which Estepp sprayed Gordon with Mace and attempted to leave the car. This greatly angered Gordon, who subsequently attacked, raped and killed her.

The majority of Gordon's testimony was confirmed when DNA testing confirmed that both his and Cano's genotypic profiles matched the biological traces found on Estepp's body. In addition, another piece of evidence was a transcript of text messages that was seized from both men's phones. In late November 2014, both Gordon and Cano were charged with the four murders in a preliminary hearing.

== Trial and imprisonment ==
From the beginning, it was decided that Gordon and Cano would be tried separately. The former's trial began on November 16, 2016, with him firing his state-provided attorney and instead choosing to represent himself. Shortly before the trial's beginning, the Orange County Prosecutor's Office offered a plea deal: in exchange for pleading guilty to the murder charges, they would drop the rape charges and not seek the death penalty, but Gordon rejected their proposal.

The prosecution's main evidence at trial were the DNA test conducted on Estepp's body; computer records of the ankle bracelet monitor information and a print of the text messages exchanged with Cano, during which the pair discussed their victims, as well as how to kidnap and murder them. At trial, Gordon recanted his confession and pleaded not guilty - however, he made little effort to defend himself and in early December, at one of the court hearings, he unexpectedly pleaded guilty. He went on to criticize the decision for his parole as well as his parole officers, saying that they were negligent in their duties. Gordon then filed a motion to subpoena his former parole officers, which was granted by the court - during testimony, the officers denied any wrongdoing, while Gordon continued to accuse them of negligence by pointing out that they allowed him to associate with another known sex offender, which violated regulations.

On December 15, Gordon was found guilty on all counts by jury verdict, but remained calm and unresponsive during the proceedings. Six days later, after only a day of deliberations, the jury returned a death verdict against him. Gordon himself praised the jury for their decision, refused to ask for leniency from the court, and expressed apparent remorse for his actions. He apologized to the family members of his victims and spoke out against his accomplice, claiming that Cano also deserved the death penalty for his involvement.

On February 3, 2017, Gordon was officially sentenced to death, whereupon he was transferred to San Quentin State Prison. During the sentencing phase, family members of his victims made some emotional statements, after which Gordon cried and once again apologized. After the proceedings, several of them told reporters that they could not comprehend the pair's motives to commit the crimes, while Estepp's mother, Jodi Estepp-Pier, said that she was unmoved by Gordon's apology.

In April 2017, Anaheim police claimed to have identified Gordon's fifth victim. In his original statements, he had claimed that she was a black sex worker the pair had picked up in Compton in mid-February 2014, and that she was short, slender, in her early 20s, with black hair and several tattoos. After investigating many missing persons reports, the potential victim was identified as 19-year-old Sable Alexandria Pickett, who was declared missing on February 14, 2014. According to her family, Pickett had graduated from Compton High School in 2013 and planned to enlist in the Army, but after she was rejected, she left home and became a sex worker in the Compton area.

As of June 2026, Gordon remains on death row at California State Prison, Sacramento, while Cano pled guilty to four murders on December 15, 2022, and was sentenced to life in prison without the possibility of parole.

== See also ==
- Capital punishment in California
- List of death row inmates in the United States § California
- List of serial killers in the United States
