= Roy Charles Waller =

American serial rapist (born 1960)

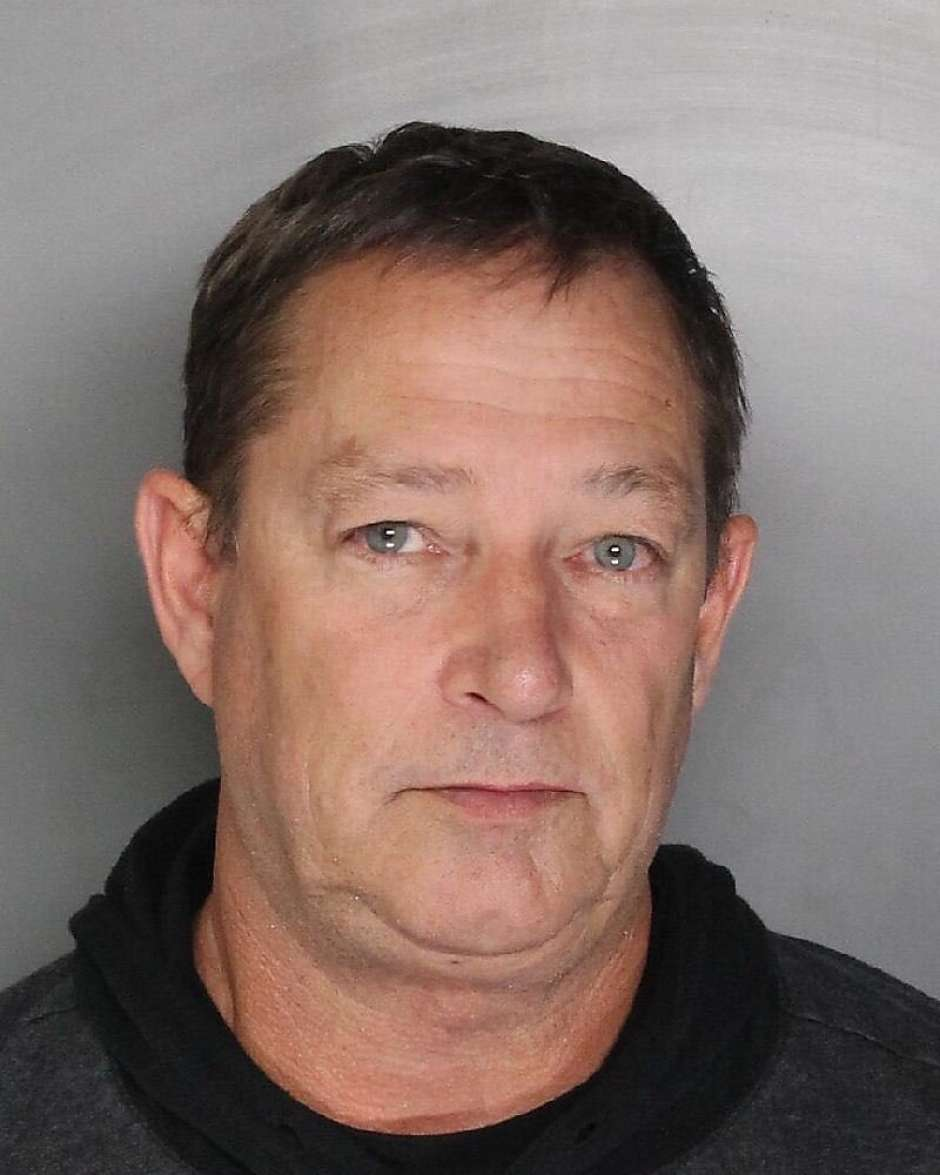
- Waller in 2019
- Born: Roy Charles Waller; January 8, 1960 (age 66); Contra Costa County, California, U.S.
- Other name: NorCal Rapist
- Occupation: UC Berkeley employee
- Employer: UC Berkeley
- Spouse: unnamed wife
- Children: 1
- Convictions: 46 counts of rape, kidnapping and sodomy
- Penalty: 897 years to life in prison

Details
- Victims: 9+
- Span of crimes: 1991–2006
- Country: United States
- State: California
- Date apprehended: September 20, 2018
- Imprisoned at: California State Prison, Sacramento

Roy Charles "Porky" Waller (born January 8, 1960) is an American serial rapist. He lived in the San Francisco Bay Area and for 26 years was employed as a safety engineer in the Environment, Health and Safety Office at the University of California, Berkeley. He was arrested in September 2018 as a suspect in a series of more than ten rapes and kidnappings committed between 1991 and 2006 in six Northern California counties (the NorCal Rapist). DNA evidence from crime scenes were matched on the online DNA-matching service, GEDmatch, to a relative of Waller, and he was identified through genetics-based genealogy.

Police constructed a family tree and, using the known elements of the rapist, narrowed the suspects down to Waller. After the GEDmatch confirmation, they took about a week to identify and arrest the suspect. He was charged with dozens of counts of rape, which took place in five different counties, including Sonoma, Solano, Contra Costa, Yolo and Butte. At the time of his arrest he was living in Benicia, was married, and was employed as a safety specialist at the University of California, Berkeley. He had worked there for 26 years. He was convicted of 46 counts in November 2020.

The same genetic genealogy technique had been used in the identification and arrest of the suspect known as the Golden State Killer.

== NorCal Rapist crime details ==
According to a detective who first worked on the case, in the attacks for which Waller is charged, the rapist had a pattern of behavior. He would enter victims' houses, usually late at night. Sometimes the victim would be asleep. Sometimes they would be going about evening activities. He would overcome and bind the women, then repeatedly sexually assault them and ransack the home. Sometimes he would abduct the victim, taking her to an ATM, and forcing the victim to give him the password, and he would steal money from the account. At "other times, he would steal personal items from their homes," Detective Avis Beery said. He frequently targeted women of Asian descent in their 20s.

== Legal proceedings ==
Waller was originally charged with 12 counts of forcible sexual assault. In January 2019, he was charged with an additional 28 counts. He was later charged with a total of 46 felony counts. His trial date was set for May 27, 2020 but was delayed multiple times. His trial began on October 19, and on November 18, Waller was convicted of 46 counts of rape, sodomy and kidnapping involving nine victims. On December 18, Waller was sentenced to 897 years to life in prison. He will be eligible for parole in 2043.
