= Rodriguez Camp, California =

Rodriguez Camp
- census-designated place
- Location in Tulare County and the state of California

- Position in California.
- Coordinates: 35°48′32″N 119°08′20″W
- Country: United States
- State: California
- County: Tulare

Area
  - Total: 0.263 sq mi (0.682 km^{2})
  - Land: 0.263 sq mi (0.682 km^{2})
  - Water: 0 sq mi (0 km^{2}) 0%
- Elevation: 456 ft (139 m)

Population (2020)
  - Total: 133
  - Density: 505/sq mi (195/km^{2})
- Time zone: UTC-8 (Pacific (PST))
  - Summer (DST): UTC-7 (PDT)
- GNIS feature ID: 2585443

Rodriguez Camp is a census-designated place (CDP) in Tulare County, California, United States. Rodriguez Camp sits at an elevation of 456 feet (139 m). The 2020 United States census reported Rodriguez Camp's population was 133, down from 156 at the 2010 census.

== Geography ==
According to the United States Census Bureau, the CDP covers an area of 0.3 square mile (0.7 km^{2}), all land.

== Demographics ==
Historical population
Census	Pop.	Note	%±
2010	156		—
2020	133		−14.7%
U.S. Decennial Census; 1850–1870 1880-1890; 1900 1910 1920; 1930 1940 1950; 1960 1970 1980; 1990 2000 2010

Rodriguez Camp first appeared as a census designated place in the 2010 U.S. census.

The 2020 United States census reported that Rodriguez Camp had a population of 133. The population density was 505.7 inhabitants per square mile (195.3/km^{2}). The racial makeup of Rodriguez Camp was 14 (10.5%) White, 1 (0.8%) African American, 0 (0.0%) Native American, 4 (3.0%) Asian, 0 (0.0%) Pacific Islander, 85 (63.9%) from other races, and 29 (21.8%) from two or more races. Hispanic or Latino of any race were 127 persons (95.5%).

The whole population lived in households. There were 28 households, out of which 16 (57.1%) had children under the age of 18 living in them, 18 (64.3%) were married-couple households, 2 (7.1%) were cohabiting couple households, 2 (7.1%) had a female householder with no partner present, and 6 (21.4%) had a male householder with no partner present. 2 households (7.1%) were one person, and 0 (0.0%) were one person aged 65 or older. The average household size was 4.75. There were 25 families (89.3% of all households).

The age distribution was 56 people (42.1%) under the age of 18, 14 people (10.5%) aged 18 to 24, 34 people (25.6%) aged 25 to 44, 16 people (12.0%) aged 45 to 64, and 13 people (9.8%) who were 65 years of age or older. The median age was 23.6 years. There were 64 males and 69 females.

There were 33 housing units at an average density of 125.5 units per square mile (48.5 units/km^{2}), of which 28 (84.8%) were occupied. Of these, 0 (0.0%) were owner-occupied, and 28 (100.0%) were occupied by renters.

== Education ==
The CDP is served by the Richgrove Elementary School District and the Delano Joint Union High School District.
