= Delano Union Elementary School District =

School district in California, United States

Address
- 1405 12th Avenue Delano, California, 93215; United States

District information
- Type: Public
- Grades: K–8
- NCES District ID: 0610890

Students and staff
- Students: 6,392
- Teachers: 286.08 (FTE)
- Staff: 392.31 (FTE)
- Student–teacher ratio: 22.34

Other information
- Website: www.duesd.org

The Delano Union Elementary School District is in Delano, California. Of the 11 schools, eight of the schools are K-5. They are Princeton, Morningside, Harvest, Fremont, Terrace, Albany Park, Nueva Vista and Del Vista. The other 3 serve 6th-8th grade. They include Cecil Ave., Almond Tree, and La Vina. The oldest, Cecil Ave. was once an Elementary School and is currently located across from the city's first High School DHS (Delano High School).
