= California State Prison, Sacramento =

Male-only state prison in California, US

California State Prison, Sacramento (SAC)
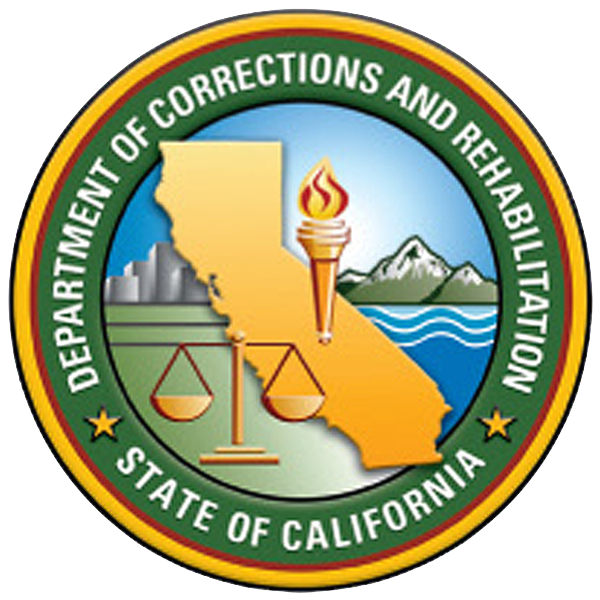
- Aerial View
- Interactive map of California State Prison, Sacramento (SAC)
- Location: Represa, California; 38.694°N 121.153°W
- Status: Operational
- Security class: Maximum
- Capacity: 1,828
- Population: 1,590 (86.7% capacity) (January 31, 2023)
- Opened: October 1986
- Managed by: California Department of Corrections and Rehabilitation
- Warden: Jeff Lynch

California State Prison, Sacramento (SAC) is a male-only state prison located in the city of Folsom, in Sacramento County, California. The facility is also referenced as Sacramento State Prison, CSP-Sacramento, CSP-SAC, and occasionally, New Folsom or New Folsom Prison which was its official name prior to October 1992.

Because the facility is adjacent to Folsom State Prison (FSP), both SAC and FSP share the mailing address: Represa, CA 95671. Represa (translated as "dam" from the Spanish language) is the name given to the State Prison post office because its adjacency to Folsom Dam.

The facility houses maximum security prisoners who were difficult to manage at other prisons and who have long sentences.

== Facilities ==
map of Folsom within Sacramento County, and Sacramento County within California

As of Fiscal Year 2006/2007, SAC had a total of 1,585 staff and an annual operating budget of $187 million. As of September 2007, it had a design capacity of 1,788 but a total institution population of 3,260, for an occupancy rate of 182.3 percent.

As of July 31, 2022, SAC was incarcerating people at 111.1% of its design capacity, with 2,031 occupants.

SAC's 1,200 acres (490 ha) facilities include:

- Level IV housing – Cells, fenced or walled perimeters, electronic security, more staff and armed officers both inside and outside the installation
- Psychiatric Services Unit.

The prison has "three similar but separate self-contained facilities... each comprised of eight housing blocks and a recreation yard." The housing blocks "are partitioned into three separate, self-contained sections forming a 180 degree half circle." The "180" design is considered the "most secure prison design" because it "gives control-booth officers a straight-on look at prisoners." In contrast, the "270" design "with portions of the house reaching back behind the blind side of the booth" is considered less secure.

== History ==
When they were built, the maximum-security buildings of what is now SAC were considered an "addition" to FSP. The first FSP inmates were transferred to the addition on October 1, 1986. In 1986, the prison was administered by the Folsom warden and was called New Folsom. In October 1992, its name was changed to CSP-Sacramento, and was administered as a separate prison with its own warden."

Erik Menendez was sent to SAC with a sentence of "life in prison without parole" in September 1996. He was married there in June 1999.

A major fight involving about 150 inmates occurred at the prison in September 1996, with 13 inmates injured and 17 shots fired by officers (one of which struck and killed an inmate). Local officials opposed a 2001 law and two 2005 bills that might eventually have led to a transfer of death row operations from San Quentin State Prison to SAC.

On May 20, 2011, a large-scale riot broke out at the prison. Prison spokesman Sgt. Tony Quinn said the incident started just after 10 a.m. when two inmates began fighting with each other. The fight then took over the yard with approximately 150 inmates getting involved. At least two inmates were stabbed multiple times and were taken to an outside hospital for treatment.

On August 12, 2015, a riot occurred at SAC in which Hugo Pinell (of the San Quentin Six) was killed.

On March 5, 2025, an unknown-related incident injured several people at SAC.

== Notable inmates ==
- Steven Dean Gordon - Serial killer and rapist sentenced to death in 2017 for four murders. Transferred to CSP SAC from San Quentin State Prison due to the abolishment of death row.
- Kori Ali Muhammad - mass-murderer, misandrist, and perpetrator in the 2017 Fresno shootings
- Wesley Shermantine - One half of the Speed Freak Killers sentenced to death in 2001 for four counts of murder. Transferred from San Quentin State Prison to CSP-SAC due to the abolishment of death row.
- John Lee Cowell - perpetrator of the 2018 Murder of Nia Wilson.
- One L. Goh (1968-2019) - perpetrator of the 2012 Oikos University shooting
- Spoon Jackson (born 1957) - murderer and poet; served over 12 years at SAC
- Joe Hunt (born Joseph Henry Gamsky) - founder of the Billionaire Boys Club and serving a life sentence for the murder of Ron Levin
- Ramon Escobar - serial killer
- Roy Charles Waller - serial rapist.
