= Newhall incident =

Shootout near Santa Clarita, California

- Video produced by the CHP detailing the incident
- Location of the incident within the Santa Clarita Valley
- Location: 34.4233°N 118.5850°W; The Old Road and Henry Mayo Drive (now Magic Mountain Parkway); Valencia, California, US
- Date: April 5–6, 1970 (56 years ago)
- Target: California Highway Patrol officers
- Attack type: Mass shooting, mass murder, shootout
- Weapons: Smith & Wesson Model 28 revolver; Smith & Wesson Bodyguard Model 49 revolver; Sawed-off 12-gauge Western Field M550 pump-action shotgun; 2 Colt M1911 semi-automatic pistols
- Deaths: 5 (including one perpetrator)
- Injuries: 2 (one of the perpetrators who was struck by gunfire and Daniel Schwartz who was pistol-whipped)
- Perpetrators: Bobby Davis; Jack Twinning

The Newhall incident, also called the Newhall massacre, was a deadly shootout on April 5–6, 1970, in Valencia, California, United States, (Note: Although the incident is named after Newhall, it took place at the intersection of The Old Road and Magic Mountain Parkway, in the nearby neighborhood of Valencia.) between two heavily armed criminals and four officers of the California Highway Patrol (CHP). In less than 30 minutes, four CHP officers and one of the suspects were killed and another man was pistol-whipped in what was at the time the deadliest day in the history of California law enforcement.

At about 11:54 p.m. on April 5, CHP officers Walt Frago and Roger Gore conducted a traffic stop of Bobby Davis and Jack Twinning in conjunction with an incident reported to the CHP minutes earlier. Davis and Twinning initially cooperated with the officers but then opened fire, killing both of them. Moments later, officers George Alleyn and James Pence arrived on the scene and engaged the perpetrators in a shootout. A bystander tried to help by firing an officer's weapon, but the three were outgunned. Both Alleyn and Pence suffered fatal injuries, while the witness ran out of ammunition and took cover in a ditch. A third CHP patrol car arrived on scene, and the officers briefly exchanged gunfire with the perpetrators, who then fled.

Davis stole a car and attempted to flee the area but was spotted by police and arrested. Meanwhile, Twinning broke into a house, taking the occupant hostage. The house was surrounded by deputies of the Los Angeles County Sheriff's Department, and Twinning released the hostage. He committed suicide around 9 a.m. as the deputies entered the house.

In 1972, Davis was convicted and sentenced to death for the murders. His sentence was later commuted to life imprisonment without the possibility of parole. Davis committed suicide at Kern Valley State Prison in 2009.

The Newhall incident resulted in a number of changes at the CHP, including procedural changes for arresting high-risk suspects, standardization of firearms and firearms training used throughout the department.

== Victims ==
- Officer George Michael Alleyn, age 24
- Officer Walter Carroll Frago, age 23
- Officer Roger Davis Gore, age 23
- Officer James E. Pence Jr., age 24
- Daniel James Schwartz, age 40 (pistol-whipped, survived)

All four officers had less than two years with the California Highway Patrol (CHP). All were married and had a combined total of seven children.

== Perpetrators ==
Jack Wright Twinning (September 11, 1935 – April 6, 1970), age 34, and Bobby Augusta Davis (November 15, 1942 – August 16, 2009), age 27, were both career criminals with long histories of violent felonies. Twinning had been in and out of eight different federal prisons since age 16, including a five-year stint at Alcatraz Federal Penitentiary, during which he killed another prisoner in self-defense. He had been released from the federal prison in Tallahassee, Florida, eleven months prior to the shootings. Davis had been released from prison eight months prior to the shootings and was on parole in Houston, Texas. Twinning and Davis met and became friends in prison.

After failing to land jobs following their release from prison, Twinning and Davis met again in Houston, and drove to Sacramento, California, where they failed in their attempt to rob banks. They then drove to Los Angeles in a 1964 Pontiac Grand Prix. En route to Los Angeles, they noticed construction along the highway near Gorman and believed they could steal explosives there to commit a robbery.

Twinning and Davis rented an apartment in Long Beach. Soon after, they began observing an armored car delivering cash to Santa Anita Park. They devised a scheme to use explosives to rob the armored car on a freeway offramp. They returned to the construction site to procure the explosives. Inside their vehicle, they had amassed numerous weapons, including a Smith & Wesson Model 39 9mm semi-automatic pistol, a six-inch Colt Python .357 Magnum revolver, two snub-nosed Colt Detective Special .38-caliber revolvers, an M1903 Springfield .30-06 bolt-action, a Remington Model 572 .22-caliber pump-action rifle and a .44 Magnum Ruger Model 44 semi-automatic carbine.

== Details ==
=== Prior to the shootout ===
On the evening of April 5, 1970, Davis dropped Twinning off in the mountains to steal the explosives. At approximately 11:20 p.m. (UTC-8), Davis was driving northbound on Interstate 5 south of Gorman when he made an illegal U-turn across the highway median, nearly colliding with a southbound vehicle driven by Ivory Jack Tidwell (1925–2016), a serviceman en route to Port Hueneme with his wife, Viola Bernice White (1936–2019), as passenger. Tidwell had an argument with Davis and both stopped their vehicles, whereupon Davis brandished a firearm. Tidwell persuaded Davis that the CHP was in the area, and Davis drove away. The couple immediately drove to a public telephone and reported the incident, including a description of Davis' vehicle, to the CHP. Officers in the area were informed the vehicle was wanted in connection with a misdemeanor. The area was sparsely populated; hunting and shooting were allowed.

=== Shootout begins ===
Several minutes later, CHP officers Walt Frago and Roger Gore, partners in the same 1969 Dodge Polara patrol car, spotted the red Pontiac near Castaic and began following the vehicle. The driver was accompanied by a male passenger. Officers James Pence and George Alleyn, partners in a second 1969 Polara patrol car, waited in nearby Valencia ready to back up Frago and Gore. The suspect's vehicle exited the freeway at Henry Mayo Drive, near the present-day site of Six Flags Magic Mountain, and pulled into the parking lot of J's Coffee Shop, adjacent to a Standard gas station. Frago and Gore ordered the two occupants to exit their vehicle. Obeying the officer's orders, Davis exited the driver's seat and walked to the rear of the vehicle, where Gore proceeded to search him. Meanwhile, Frago approached the other side of the car carrying a shotgun at "port arms" with the stock against his hip and the barrel pointed in the air.

As Frago walked to the Pontiac, Twinning exited the passenger seat and opened fire with a Smith & Wesson Model 28 revolver. Before Frago could aim or fire his shotgun at Twinning, he was struck by two .357 Magnum rounds and killed. Gore immediately drew his Colt Python and returned fire at Twinning, but in doing so lost track of Davis, who was right next to him. While Twinning and Gore exchanged gunfire, Davis pulled a .38 Special caliber Smith & Wesson Model 49 revolver out of his waistband and killed Gore with two shots at point blank range.

Shortly after Gore was killed, Alleyn and Pence arrived on the scene. Davis and Twinning immediately opened fire on them with their pistols, expending all their remaining rounds, and dove back into their own car for new weapons. In total, they had twice as many weapons as the four CHP officers they would eventually face had in their two patrol cars.

Davis pulled out a sawed-off 12-gauge Western Field M550 (a re-branded Mossberg produced for the Montgomery Ward chain) pump-action shotgun, while Twinning grabbed a semi-automatic Colt M1911 .45 ACP caliber pistol. Twinning's pistol jammed after one shot, but he grabbed another M1911 from the car and exited the driver's side. Meanwhile, Alleyn emptied his Remington Model 870 shotgun at the Pontiac, firing the gun so fast he accidentally ejected a live round in the process. A single pellet from the shotgun struck Twinning in the forehead, but it caused only a minor superficial wound. After expending all his shotgun rounds, Alleyn opened fire on Davis with his Smith & Wesson Model 19 .357 Magnum revolver but did not make any hits. Davis returned fire with his sawed-off shotgun, striking Alleyn with ten rounds of 00 buckshot and inflicting fatal injuries.

=== Gary Kness ===
Gary Dean Kness, age 31, a former U.S. Marine and computer operator, was en route to work when he came upon the shootout. Kness got out of his vehicle and ran over to Alleyn, who he attempted to drag to safety but was unable to move. He looked up and saw Davis discard his now-empty sawed-off shotgun and grab the Remington shotgun that had been dropped by Frago. Without realizing Frago had never fired the gun, Davis tried to cycle the action of the shotgun, but since it had not been fired, it was locked on a live round. Eventually, he accidentally fired the gun into the air. Startled, he dropped the weapon and grabbed the service revolver from Frago's holster.

Meanwhile, on the other side of the cruiser, Pence fired all six rounds from his Colt Python .357 Magnum revolver at Twinning but missed. Twinning returned fire with his Colt 1911, hitting Pence in the chest and in both legs. Pence fell to the ground, trying to reload. At the time, the CHP did not issue speedloaders to their officers; Pence had to reload one round at a time. On the other side of the cruiser, Kness picked up Alleyn's discarded shotgun and tried to fire at Davis, but the gun was empty. As Davis opened fire on him with Frago's pistol, Kness dropped the shotgun and returned fire with Alleyn's service revolver. His shots hit the Pontiac, and a fragment from one of the bullets lodged into Davis's chest but the shot did not incapacitate him. Kness was soon out of ammunition.

Pence was still trying to reload his revolver and failed to see Twinning's approach. As Pence inserted the sixth cartridge and started to close the cylinder of his weapon, Twinning shot and killed him from behind, with two shots to the head at point blank range. Kness took cover in a nearby ditch. As he did, a third CHP cruiser arrived, carrying Sergeant Harry Ingold and Officer Roger Palmer. After a brief exchange of gunfire, Twinning and Davis fled the scene through the darkness in separate directions as a fourth CHP cruiser arrived, carrying Officers Ed Holmes and Richard Robinson. Davis took Frago's revolver with him, while Twinning ran off with Pence's revolver and Frago's shotgun.

=== Davis is arrested ===
At 3:25 a.m., Davis stumbled onto a camper parked near a dirt road. After exchanging gunfire with the owner, 40-year-old Daniel James Schwartz, armed with a World War II surplus Enfield revolver, Davis pistol-whipped Schwartz with his empty revolver and stole the camper. Schwartz called the police and reported the theft. Within hours the camper was spotted and pulled over by deputies from the Los Angeles County Sheriff's Department. Without any more loaded guns at his disposal, Davis surrendered.

=== Suicide of Twinning ===
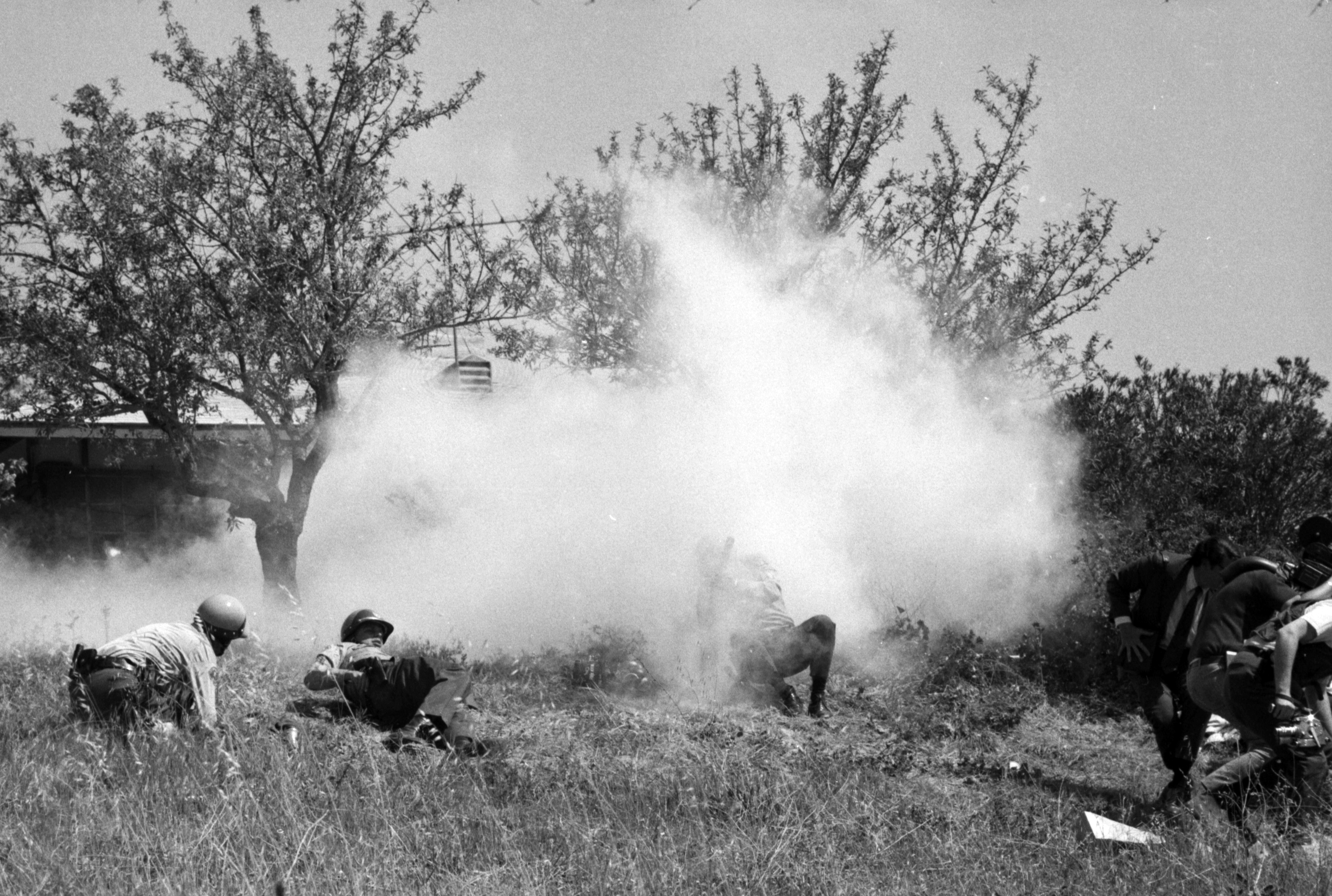
Cloud of tear gas during police raid to capture Jack W. Twinning, 1970.

Three miles away from the shootout scene, Twinning broke into the house of Glenn S. Hoag (1928–1994), and took him hostage. Hoag's wife, Betty, and their 17-year-old son, Jeff, escaped and called police, and soon the house was surrounded by deputies from the Los Angeles County Sheriff's Department. For the next several hours, negotiators talked on the phone with Twinning, who bragged about how he had taken advantage of Frago's mistake in carrying his gun at port. "He got careless, so I wasted him." By roughly 9 am, Twinning released his hostage from the house. After issuing a surrender ultimatum, police pumped tear gas into the house and stormed in. As police, led by Los Angeles County Sheriff’s Sergeant Robert Lindblom, entered the residence, Twinning killed himself with Frago's shotgun.

== Aftermath ==
Davis was convicted and sentenced to death for the murders of the four CHP officers. In 1972, Davis's sentence was commuted to life in prison without parole, due to the U.S. Supreme Court ruling in Furman v. Georgia that found state death penalty laws were unconstitutional, and effectively invalidated all death sentences in the U.S. under existing state laws. Davis was found dead, aged 66, in his maximum-security single cell at Kern Valley State Prison, an apparent suicide, on August 16, 2009.

== Police studies and changes ==
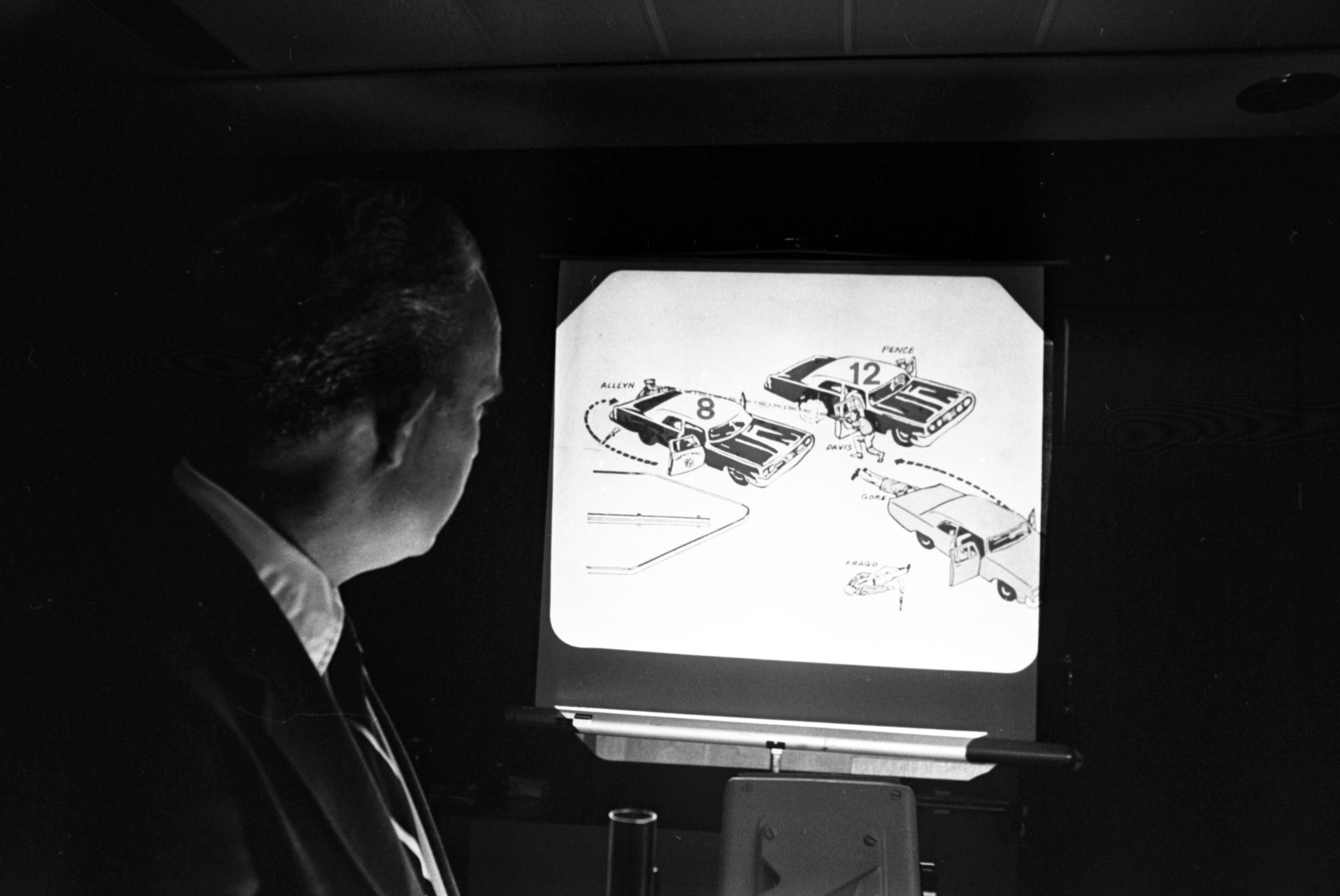
A detective looking at a projection of a diagram of the shootout.

After the shootout, the circumstances of the event were heavily scrutinized. The CHP and other police departments re-examined their methods of training and tactics.

None of the four CHP officers killed had more than two years of experience on the job. Gore and Frago were both 23 years old, while Pence and Alleyn were both 24. None were wearing a bulletproof vest, which were not widely issued to police officers at the time. Three of the patrolmen were found to have died from wounds that a standard ballistic vest might have prevented.

A key mistake made by Gore and Frago, thought to be related to their inexperience, was proceeding to approach and search the suspects immediately after pulling them over. Had they waited for Pence and Alleyn to arrive within a minute or so, it is possible Twinning and Davis would have surrendered or been overwhelmed by superior firepower when faced with four-on-two odds.

The three officers who fired their handguns were using .357 Magnum rounds, although they had trained and been certified only with .38 Special ammunition, which has less recoil. Soon after the shootout, the CHP standardized their ammunition on the .38-caliber round, ensuring all officers trained with the same ammunition they would use on duty. Lack of familiarity with their service shotguns was also cited as a problem during the shootout. Frago had mistakenly approached the vehicle with his shotgun held diagonally in front of his body and Alleyn had ejected a live round.

The Newhall incident showed the difficulty in reloading revolvers under fire without a speedloader. Shortly afterward, the CHP became the first major state police (or similar) department to approve and issue speedloaders. Pence might also have benefited from a backup gun when his primary revolver ran dry.

In the aftermath of the Newhall shooting, although this was not based on the actions of any officer involved in the incident, the CHP modified their training to eliminate the practice of "pocketing brass" on the range (the act of picking up spent cartridge cases before reloading with fresh rounds). Several witnesses, including officers who responded to aid the four officers, said no brass casings were found in Officer Pence's clothing. One of the first responders, CHP Sergeant Harry Ingold, said he found six brass cases on the ground next to the driver's door of Pence's and Alleyn's cruiser indicating that prior to being killed, Pence had dumped his spent brass casings on the ground before reloading his revolver. This was confirmed by CHP Chief John Anderson in his book The Newhall Incident: America's Worst Cop Massacre.

== Legacy and honors ==
California Senate Concurrent Resolution 93, introduced by Senator George Runner, designated Interstate 5 between the Rye Canyon Road overpass and Magic Mountain Parkway in Santa Clarita as the "California Highway Patrol Officers James E. Pence, Jr., Roger D. Gore, Walter C. Frago, and George M. Alleyn Memorial Highway" and was passed on August 11, 2006. A dedication ceremony was held on the 38th anniversary of the incident, in 2008 and attended by Kness, then aged 69, who was praised as a hero.

== Representation in other media ==
- The Newhall Incident: A Law Enforcement Tragedy (2010) was a documentary produced by SCVTV.
- The podcast A Morning Cup of Murder featured the Newhall Incident on its April 6, 2022 episode.

== See also ==
- List of homicides in California
- List of law enforcement officers killed in the line of duty in the United States

== Bibliography ==
- Anderson, John; Cassady, Marsh (1999), The Newhall Incident: America's Worst Uniformed Cop Massacre, Clovis, Calif.: Quill Driver Books, ISBN 978-1-884956-01-0, OCLC 40142933
- Wood, Michael E. (2012), Newhall Shooting – A Tactical Analysis: Survival Lessons from one of Law enforcement's Deadliest Shootings, Iola, Wis.: Krause Publications, ISBN 978-1-4402-4099-7, OCLC 861674082
