= Richgrove, California =

Richgrove
- census-designated place
- Location in Tulare County and the state of California

- Location in the United States
- Coordinates: 35°47′48″N 119°6′24″W
- Country: United States
- State: California
- County: Tulare

Area
  - Total: 0.452 sq mi (1.171 km^{2})
  - Land: 0.452 sq mi (1.171 km^{2})
  - Water: 0 sq mi (0 km^{2}) 0%
- Elevation: 515 ft (157 m)

Population (2020)
  - Total: 2,358
  - Density: 5,215/sq mi (2,014/km^{2})
- Time zone: UTC-8 (Pacific (PST))
  - Summer (DST): UTC-7 (PDT)
- ZIP code: 93261
- Area code: 661
- FIPS code: 06-60606
- GNIS feature ID: 1661309

Richgrove is a census-designated place (CDP) in Tulare County, California, United States. The population was 2,358 at the 2020 United States census, down from 2,882 at the 2010 census.

== Geography ==
Richgrove is located at 35°47′48″N 119°6′24″W (35.796677, -119.106654).

According to the United States Census Bureau, the CDP has a total area of 0.45 square miles (1.2 km^{2}), all land.

== Demographics ==
Historical population
Census	Pop.	Note	%±
1970	1,023		—
1980	1,398		36.7%
1990	1,899		35.8%
2000	2,723		43.4%
2010	2,882		5.8%
2020	2,358		−18.2%
U.S. Decennial Census; 1860–1870 1880-1890; 1900 1910 1920; 1930 1940 1950; 1960 1970 1980; 1990 2000 2010

Richgrove first appeared as a census designated place in the 1970 U.S. census; and as a census designated place in the 1980 U.S. census.

=== 2020 census ===
As of the 2020 census, Richgrove had a population of 2,358. The population density was 5,216.8 inhabitants per square mile (2,014.2/km^{2}). The median age was 28.2 years. 35.0% of residents were under the age of 18, 11.3% were aged 18 to 24, 24.0% were aged 25 to 44, 21.5% were aged 45 to 64, and 8.3% were 65 years of age or older. For every 100 females, there were 107.2 males, and for every 100 females age 18 and over there were 102.5 males age 18 and over.

The Census reported that 2,358 people (100% of the population) lived in households. There were 568 households, of which 54.9% had children under the age of 18 living in them. Of all households, 57.6% were married-couple households, 7.4% were cohabiting couple households, 12.9% were households with a male householder and no spouse or partner present, and 22.2% were households with a female householder and no spouse or partner present. About 6.7% of all households were made up of individuals, and 2.2% had someone living alone who was 65 years of age or older. The average household size was 4.15. There were 517 families (91.0% of all households).

There were 583 housing units at an average density of 1,289.8 units per square mile (498.0 units/km^{2}), of which 2.6% were vacant and 568 (97.4%) were occupied. Of occupied units, 42.3% were owner-occupied and 57.7% were occupied by renters. The homeowner vacancy rate was 0.4% and the rental vacancy rate was 2.4%. 0.0% of residents lived in urban areas, while 100.0% lived in rural areas.

Racial composition as of the 2020 census
Race	Number	Percent
White	191	8.1%
Black or African American	5	0.2%
American Indian and Alaska Native	45	1.9%
Asian	87	3.7%
Native Hawaiian and Other Pacific Islander	0	0.0%
Some other race	1,541	65.4%
Two or more races	489	20.7%
Hispanic or Latino (of any race)	2,243	95.1%

=== Income and poverty ===
In 2023, the US Census Bureau estimated that the median household income was $54,091, and the per capita income was $12,978. About 31.2% of families and 30.4% of the population were below the poverty line.

=== 2010 census ===
The 2010 United States census reported that Richgrove had a population of 2,882. The population density was 6,376.2 inhabitants per square mile (2,461.9/km^{2}). The racial makeup of Richgrove was 1,068 (37.1%) White, 20 (0.7%) African American, 38 (1.3%) Native American, 140 (4.9%) Asian, 7 (0.2%) Pacific Islander, 1,521 (52.8%) from other races, and 88 (3.1%) from two or more races. Hispanic or Latino of any race were 2,705 persons (93.9%).

The Census reported that 2,882 people (100% of the population) lived in households, 0 (0%) lived in non-institutionalized group quarters, and 0 (0%) were institutionalized.

There were 598 households, out of which 441 (73.7%) had children under the age of 18 living in them, 410 (68.6%) were opposite-sex married couples living together, 95 (15.9%) had a female householder with no husband present, 64 (10.7%) had a male householder with no wife present. There were 54 (9.0%) unmarried opposite-sex partnerships, and 2 (0.3%) same-sex married couples or partnerships. 20 households (3.3%) were made up of individuals, and 12 (2.0%) had someone living alone who was 65 years of age or older. The average household size was 4.82. There were 569 families (95.2% of all households); the average family size was 4.78.

The population age distribution is 1,157 people (40.1%) under the age of 18, 387 people (13.4%) aged 18 to 24, 757 people (26.3%) aged 25 to 44, 451 people (15.6%) aged 45 to 64, and 130 people (4.5%) who were 65 years of age or older. The median age was 22.9 years. For every 100 females, there were 111.8 males. For every 100 females age 18 and over, there were 108.8 males.

There were 610 housing units at an average density of 1,349.6 units per square mile (521.1 units/km^{2}), of which 271 (45.3%) were owner-occupied, and 327 (54.7%) were occupied by renters. The homeowner vacancy rate was 0%; the rental vacancy rate was 0.3%. 1,247 people (43.3% of the population) lived in owner-occupied housing units and 1,635 people (56.7%) lived in rental housing units.

== Politics ==
In the state legislature Richgrove is located in the 16th senatorial district, represented by Democrat Melissa Hurtado, and in the 33rd Assembly district, represented by Republican Alexandra Macedo.

In the United States House of Representatives, Richgrove is in California's 22nd congressional district, represented by Republican David Valadao

== Education ==
The CDP is served by the Richgrove Elementary School District and the Delano Joint Union High School District.
