= Kern Valley State Prison =

Prison in Delano, California

Kern Valley State Prison (KVSP)
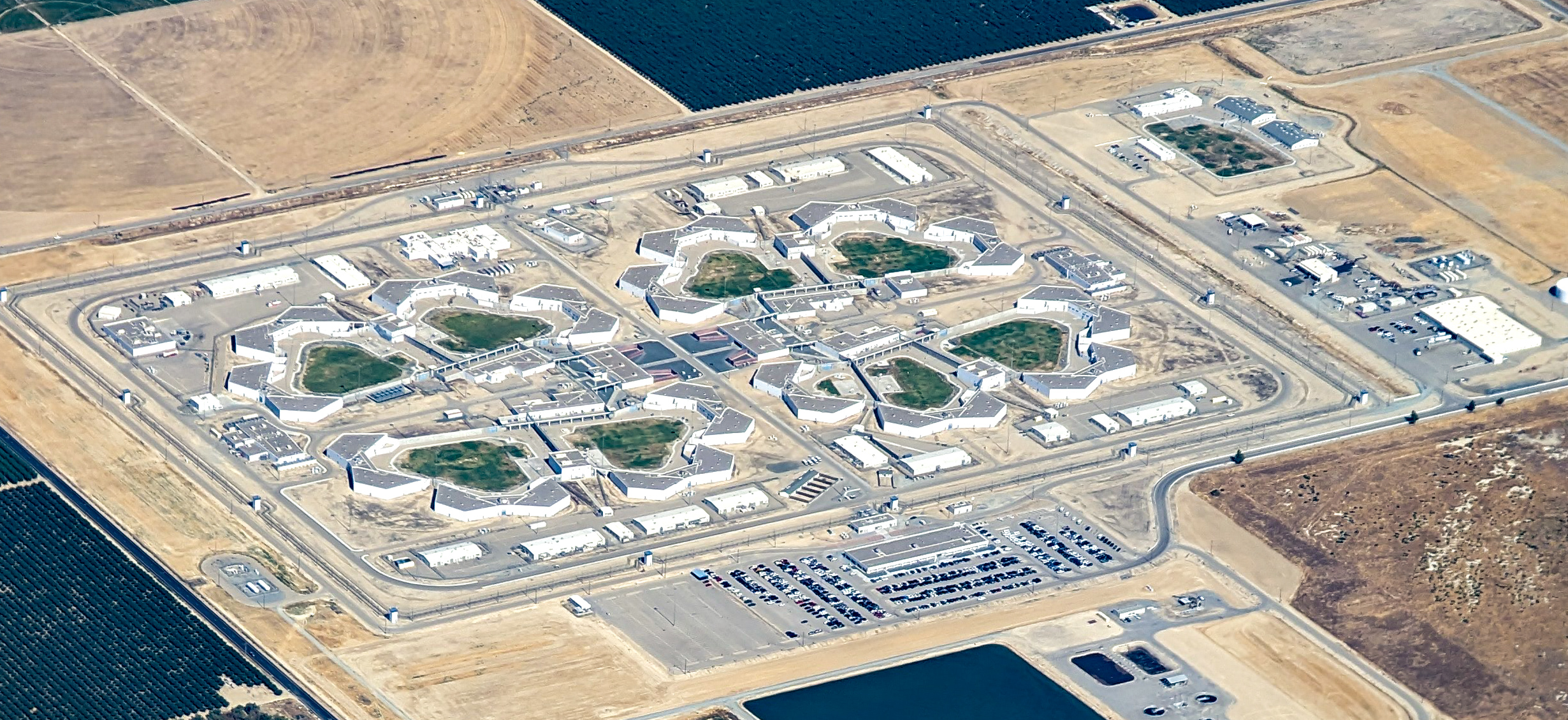
- KVSP overhead view
- Interactive map of Kern Valley State Prison (KVSP)
- Location: Delano, California; 35.7661°N 119.3251°W
- Status: Operational
- Security class: Maximum
- Capacity: 2,448
- Population: 3,293 (134.5% capacity) (March 11, 2026)
- Opened: June 2005
- Managed by: California Department of Corrections and Rehabilitation
- Warden: Patwin Horn

Kern Valley State Prison (KVSP) is a male-only state prison in Delano, California. Kern Valley is a Level IV Maximum Security institution, opened in June 2005 with a design capacity of 2,448 inmates. The facility is adjacent to North Kern State Prison and has an annual operating budget of US$123 million.

As of March 11, 2026, Kern Valley was incarcerating people at 134.5% of its design capacity, with 3,293 occupants.

Location of Delano in Kern County, and Kern County in California

== Notable inmates ==
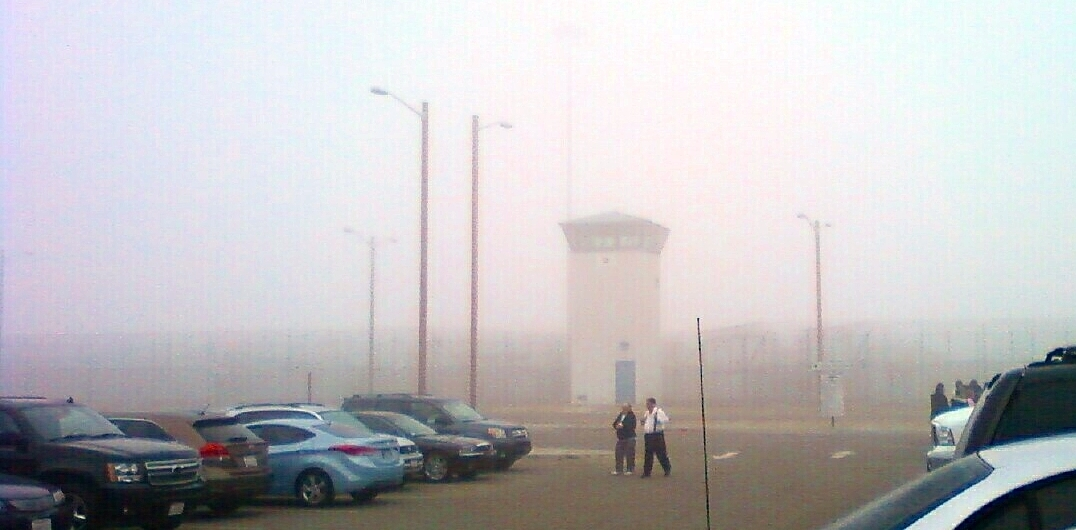
KVSP during a foggy winter morning

| Inmate Name | Register Number | Status | Details |
|---|---|---|---|
| Juan Manuel Alvarez | G33008 | Serving 11 life sentences without the possibility of parole. Transferred to Richard J. Donovan Correctional Facility. | Perpetrator of the 2005 Glendale train crash in which he intentionally left his car on the railroad track, and a passenger train proceeded to collide with it, causing a derailment which killed 11 people. |
| Antron Singleton | V24953 | Serving a life sentence. | American rapper who went by the name "Big Lurch" who was convicted of murdering and committing cannibalism on his roommate. |

== See also ==
- List of California state prisons
