= Delano, California =

City in California, United States

- City
- City of Delano
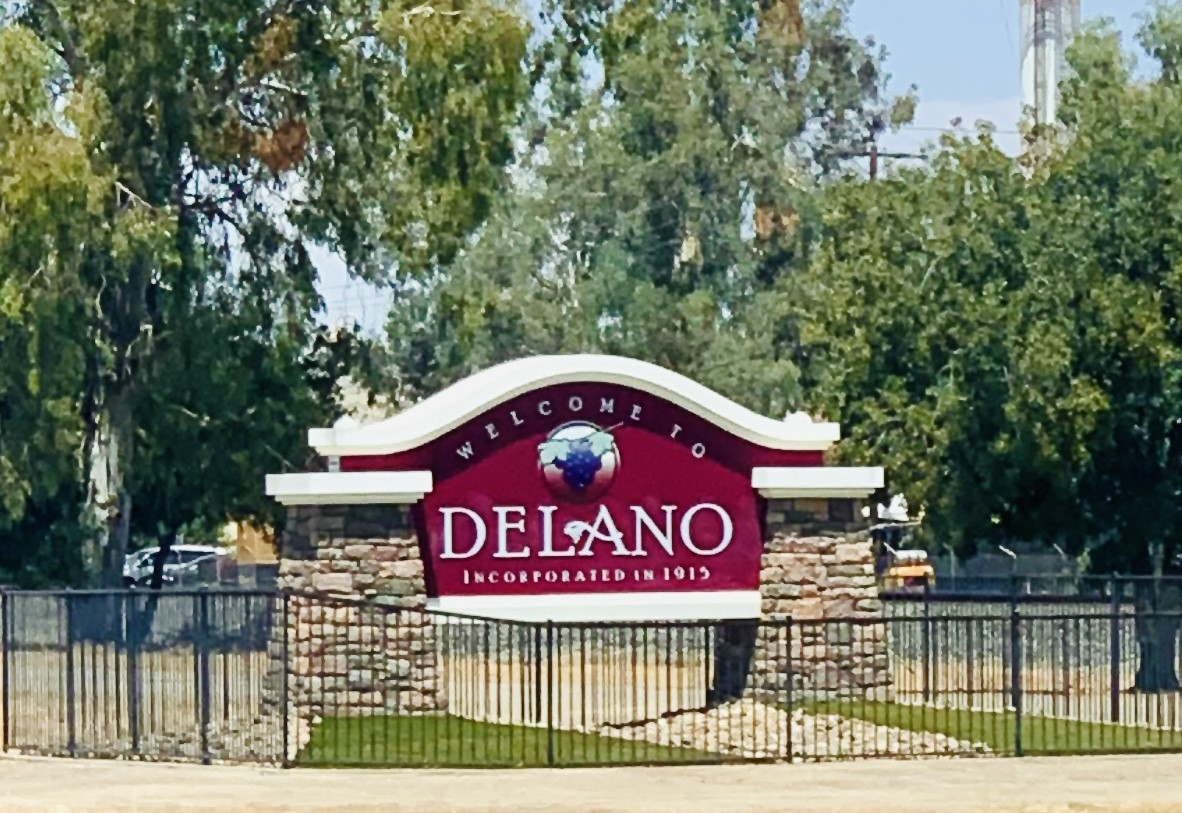
- Delano entry signage on State Route 99

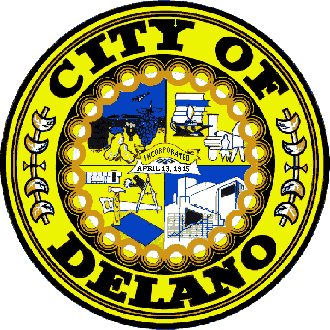
- Seal
- Interactive map of Delano, California
- Location within California Location within the United States
- Coordinates: 35°46′08″N 119°14′49″W
- Country: United States
- State: California
- County: Kern
- Founded: 1873
- Incorporated: April 13, 1915
- Named for: Columbus Delano

Government
  - City Council: Mayor Salvador Solorio-Ruiz; Liz Morris; Bryan Osorio; Joe L. Alindajao; Mario Nunez
  - State Senator: Melissa Hurtado (D)
  - State Assembly: Jasmeet Bains (D)
  - U. S. Congress: David Valadao (R)

Area
  - Total: 14.77 sq mi (38.25 km^{2})
  - Land: 14.71 sq mi (38.11 km^{2})
  - Water: 0.054 sq mi (0.14 km^{2}) 0.35%
- Elevation: 315 ft (96 m)

Population (2020)
  - Total: 51,428
  - Density: 3,494.6/sq mi (1,349.29/km^{2})
- Time zone: UTC−08:00 (PST)
  - Summer (DST): UTC−07:00 (PDT)
- ZIP Codes: 93215, 93216
- Area code: 661
- FIPS code: 06-18394
- GNIS feature IDs: 1652697, 2410317
- Website: cityofdelano.org

Delano (/dəˈleɪnoʊ/ də-LAY-noh) is a city in Kern County, California, United States. Delano is located about 30 miles (48 km) north-northwest of Bakersfield at an elevation of 315 feet (96 m), in the San Joaquin Valley, the southern half of California's Central Valley. The population was 51,428 in 2020, down from 53,041 in 2010. It is Kern County's second-largest city after Bakersfield.

Agriculture is Delano's major industry. The area is particularly well known as a center for the growing of table grapes. Delano is also home to two California state prisons, North Kern State Prison and Kern Valley State Prison. The Voice of America once operated one of its largest, most powerful shortwave broadcast facilities at a station outside Delano at 35°45′15″N 119°17′7″W. The Voice of America ceased broadcasts in October 2007, citing a changing political mission, reduced budgets, and changes in technology.

Delano's two school districts currently operate eight elementary schools, three middle schools, three comprehensive high schools and two alternative high schools. The city has its own police department and contracts with the Kern County Fire Department for fire services, EMS services are privately provided by local company, Delano Ambulance Service.

== History ==
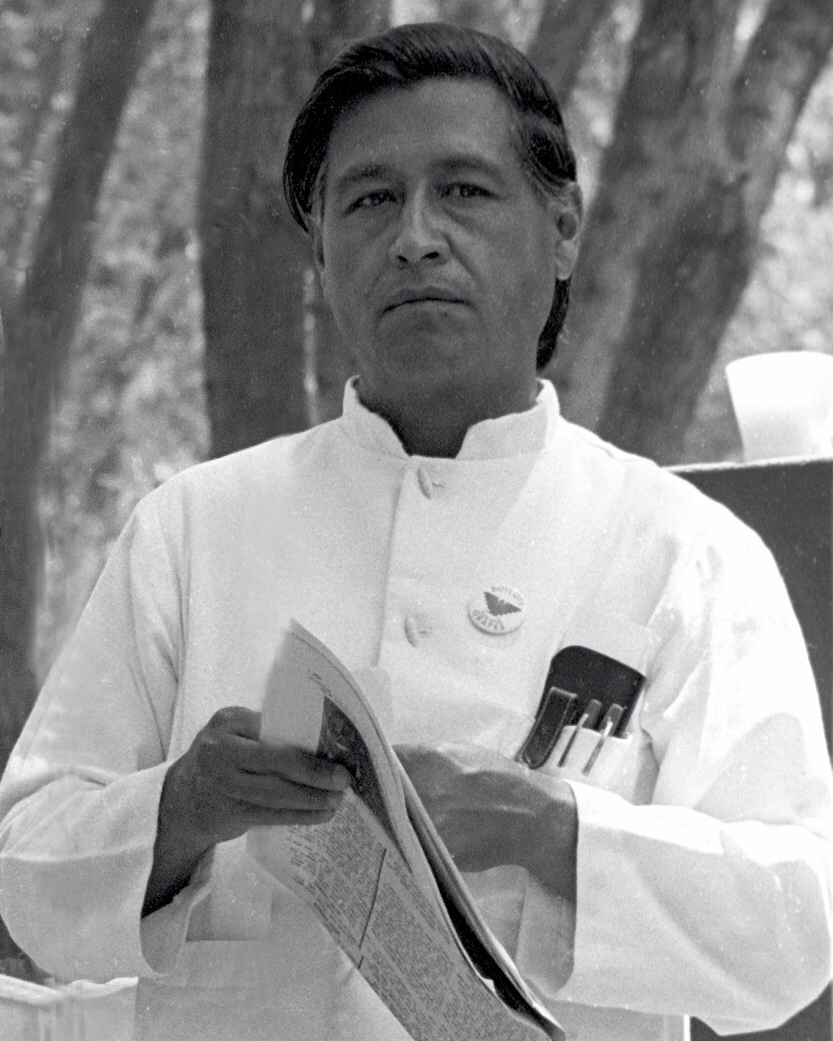
César Chávez at a United Farmworkers rally in Delano, 1972

Delano was founded on July 14, 1869, as a railroad town, not because the railroad passed through the town but because the railroad coming south from San Francisco terminated at Delano. The name was officially given by the Southern Pacific Railroad in honor of Columbus Delano, at the time the Secretary of the Interior (1870–1875) for the United States. The first post office opened in 1874. Delano incorporated in 1913.

The town started with a boom. With Delano as the southern terminus of the railroad, it became the headquarters for hundreds of workmen who were building the railroad into town, and who eventually built the railroad into Bakersfield the following year. Meanwhile, the merchandise that formerly was trucked south from Visalia to Bakersfield and then to Walker Pass, or perhaps Tejon Pass, en route to Los Angeles, now coming via freight from the south, east and west, was likewise trucked in by ox or mule team. Great loads of bullion were delivered here from the mines in the mountains. Delano became the northern terminus for the passenger stages that ran south to Bakersfield and Los Angeles. The fare from Bakersfield to Delano was $7.00.

Delano was a major hub of farm worker organization efforts and Chicano political movements. Filipino immigrants Philip Vera Cruz and Larry Dulay Itliong were instrumental in shaping the direction of the farm worker movement in the 1950s. On September 8, 1965, Larry Itliong and other Filipino leaders led the predominantly Filipino Agricultural Workers Organizing Committee (AWOC) in a "walk off" from table grape farms, now known as the Delano grape strike. The strikers' goal was to improve farm workers' wages and working conditions. The National Farm Workers' Association (NFWA), a largely Hispanic union led by Cesar Chavez, joined the strike within a week. During the strike, the two groups joined forces and formed the United Farm Workers of America (UFW). By 1970, the UFW won a contract with major grape growers across California.

== Economy ==
Major farm employers in Delano include Wonderful Citrus, Columbine Vineyards, Munger Farms, Lucich Farms, and Hronis. Other major employers include Adventist Health Hospital Delano, Walmart, The Home Depot, Vallarta Supermarkets, Delano Joint Union High School District, Delano Union Elementary School District, and the North Kern-South Tulare Hospital District.

=== Major employers ===
According to the city's 2021 Comprehensive Annual Financial Report, the top employers in the city are:

Rank	Employer	No. of Employees
1	Kern Valley State Prison	1,670
2	North Kern State Prison	1,396
=3	Delano Union Elementary School District	900
=3	Paramount Citrus	900
5	Adventist Health Delano	670
6	Delano Joint Union High School District	475
7	Walmart	300
8	Vallarta Supermarkets	255
9	City of Delano	210
10	Delano District Skilled Nursing Facility	184

== Geography ==
According to the United States Census Bureau, the city has a total area of 14.8 square miles (38 km^{2}); over 99% of which is land.

=== Climate ===
Delano, California

Climate chart (precipitation, max. and min. temperature)
J	F	M	A	M	J	J	A	S	O	N	D
1.4 56 36	1.4 63 40	1.4 69 43	0.6 77 48	0.3 85 54	0.1 93 60	0 98 65	0 97 64	0.1 91 59	0.4 82 50	0.8 67 41	1.1 56 35
- █ Average max. and min. temperatures in °F
- █ Precipitation totals in inches
- Source: Climate-Data.org (temperature), Western Regional Climate Center (precipitation)
Metric conversion
J	F	M	A	M	J	J	A	S	O	N	D
34 13 2	35 17 4	36 21 6	16 25 9	7.9 30 12	2.5 34 16	0 37 18	0.3 36 18	2.8 33 15	9.1 28 10	20 19 5	28 13 2
- █ Average max. and min. temperatures in °C
- █ Precipitation totals in mm

Delano's climate is typical of the San Joaquin Valley. It is located within a desert climatic zone with Mediterranean features. The city receives 7.51 in (191 mm) of rainfall annually, mainly in the winter. The weather is hot and dry during the summer and cool and damp in winter. Frequent winter ground fog known regionally as tule fog can obscure vision. Record temperatures range between 115 °F (46 °C) (2006) and 14 °F (−10 °C) (1990).

Climate data for Delano, California, 1991–2020 normals, extremes 2000–present
Month	Jan	Feb	Mar	Apr	May	Jun	Jul	Aug	Sep	Oct	Nov	Dec	Year
Record high °F (°C)	76 (24)	86 (30)	91 (33)	97 (36)	105 (41)	109 (43)	116 (47)	108 (42)	108 (42)	100 (38)	85 (29)	82 (28)	116 (47)
Mean maximum °F (°C)	68.7 (20.4)	75.5 (24.2)	81.7 (27.6)	89.3 (31.8)	98.5 (36.9)	105.5 (40.8)	106.5 (41.4)	104.7 (40.4)	101.8 (38.8)	91.8 (33.2)	80.0 (26.7)	68.1 (20.1)	107.9 (42.2)
Mean daily maximum °F (°C)	56.0 (13.3)	62.8 (17.1)	69.2 (20.7)	75.0 (23.9)	83.1 (28.4)	92.2 (33.4)	97.3 (36.3)	96.5 (35.8)	90.7 (32.6)	79.6 (26.4)	66.3 (19.1)	57.2 (14.0)	77.2 (25.1)
Daily mean °F (°C)	46.9 (8.3)	51.9 (11.1)	57.0 (13.9)	62.1 (16.7)	69.3 (20.7)	77.0 (25.0)	82.5 (28.1)	81.0 (27.2)	76.1 (24.5)	66.1 (18.9)	54.4 (12.4)	47.0 (8.3)	64.3 (17.9)
Mean daily minimum °F (°C)	37.7 (3.2)	40.9 (4.9)	44.8 (7.1)	49.1 (9.5)	55.5 (13.1)	61.8 (16.6)	67.6 (19.8)	65.5 (18.6)	61.6 (16.4)	52.6 (11.4)	42.5 (5.8)	36.7 (2.6)	51.4 (10.8)
Mean minimum °F (°C)	29.9 (−1.2)	32.8 (0.4)	35.5 (1.9)	39.1 (3.9)	47.5 (8.6)	52.2 (11.2)	60.7 (15.9)	59.7 (15.4)	52.3 (11.3)	43.5 (6.4)	33.4 (0.8)	28.2 (−2.1)	26.9 (−2.8)
Record low °F (°C)	20 (−7)	25 (−4)	28 (−2)	33 (1)	38 (3)	47 (8)	43 (6)	51 (11)	46 (8)	35 (2)	24 (−4)	21 (−6)	20 (−7)
Average precipitation inches (mm)	1.40 (36)	1.32 (34)	1.39 (35)	0.62 (16)	0.38 (9.7)	0.09 (2.3)	0.04 (1.0)	0.00 (0.00)	0.04 (1.0)	0.37 (9.4)	0.67 (17)	1.19 (30)	7.51 (191.4)
Average snowfall inches (cm)	0.2 (0.51)	0.0 (0.0)	0.0 (0.0)	0.0 (0.0)	0.0 (0.0)	0.0 (0.0)	0.0 (0.0)	0.0 (0.0)	0.0 (0.0)	0.0 (0.0)	0.0 (0.0)	0.0 (0.0)	0.2 (0.51)
Average precipitation days (≥ 0.01 in)	6.8	6.1	5.6	3.4	1.4	0.4	0.2	0.0	0.5	1.8	3.8	5.9	35.9
Average snowy days (≥ 0.1 in)	0.1	0.0	0.0	0.0	0.0	0.0	0.0	0.0	0.0	0.0	0.0	0.0	0.1
Source 1: NOAA
Source 2: National Weather Service (mean maxima/minima 2006–2020)

== Demographics ==
Historical population
Census	Pop.	Note	%±
1920	805		—
1930	2,632		227.0%
1940	4,573		73.7%
1950	8,717		90.6%
1960	11,913		36.7%
1970	14,559		22.2%
1980	16,491		13.3%
1990	22,762		38.0%
2000	38,824		70.6%
2010	53,041		36.6%
2020	51,428		−3.0%
The "1920" population is for 1928; U.S. Decennial Census

=== Racial and ethnic composition ===
Delano city, California – Racial and ethnic composition Note: the US Census treats Hispanic/Latino as an ethnic category. This table excludes Latinos from the racial categories and assigns them to a separate category. Hispanics/Latinos may be of any race.
Race / Ethnicity (NH = Non-Hispanic)	Pop 2000	Pop 2010	Pop 2020	% 2000	% 2010	% 2020
White alone (NH)	3,556	3,980	2,391	9.16%	7.50%	4.65%
Black or African American alone (NH)	1,997	4,007	2,695	5.14%	7.55%	5.24%
Native American or Alaska Native alone (NH)	88	154	155	0.23%	0.29%	0.30%
Asian alone (NH)	5,902	6,436	7,079	15.20%	12.13%	13.76%
Native Hawaiian or Pacific Islander alone (NH)	12	22	35	0.03%	0.04%	0.07%
Other race alone (NH)	86	77	118	0.22%	0.15%	0.23%
Mixed race or Multiracial (NH)	599	452	502	1.54%	0.85%	0.98%
Hispanic or Latino (any race)	26,584	37,913	38,453	68.47%	71.48%	74.77%
Total	38,824	53,041	51,428	100.00%	100.00%	100.00%

=== 2020 census ===
As of the 2020 census, Delano had a population of 51,428 and a population density of 3,494.7 inhabitants per square mile (1,349.3/km^{2}). 84.9% of residents lived in urban areas, while 15.1% lived in rural areas.

The median age was 31.7 years. The age distribution was 26.0% under the age of 18, 11.3% aged 18 to 24, 32.7% aged 25 to 44, 21.1% aged 45 to 64, and 8.9% aged 65 or older. For every 100 females, there were 135.8 males, and for every 100 females age 18 and over there were 146.9 males age 18 and over.

The census reported that 83.7% of the population lived in households, 0.3% lived in non-institutionalized group quarters, and 15.9% were institutionalized. There were 11,113 households, of which 55.7% had children under the age of 18 living in them. Of all households, 52.4% were married-couple households, 7.6% were cohabiting couple households, 14.6% were households with a male householder and no spouse or partner present, and 25.4% were households with a female householder and no spouse or partner present. About 10.7% of all households were made up of individuals and 5.1% had someone living alone who was 65 years of age or older. The average household size was 3.88. There were 9,467 families (85.2% of all households).

There were 11,572 housing units, of which 11,113 (96.0%) were occupied and 4.0% were vacant. Of occupied units, 56.5% were owner-occupied and 43.5% were renter-occupied. The homeowner vacancy rate was 0.7% and the rental vacancy rate was 3.6%.

=== 2023 estimates ===
In 2023, the US Census Bureau estimated that 34.0% of the population were foreign-born. Of all people aged 5 or older, 27.1% spoke only English at home, 62.3% spoke Spanish, 0.4% spoke other Indo-European languages, 9.4% spoke Asian or Pacific Islander languages, and 0.8% spoke other languages. Of those aged 25 or older, 63.1% were high school graduates and 8.2% had a bachelor's degree.

The median household income was $61,817, and the per capita income was $19,266. About 14.0% of families and 15.9% of the population were below the poverty line.

== Education ==
The Delano Union School District operates eight elementary schools and three middle schools. The Delano Joint Union High School District provides three comprehensive high schools, a continuation high school, and an adult education center.

The majority of Delano is in the Delano Union School District, and all of it is in the Delano Joint Union HSD. A small piece of Delano is in the Pond Union Elementary School District.

=== Elementary schools ===
- Albany Park Elementary School
- Del Vista Math and Science Academy
- Fremont Elementary School
- Harvest Elementary School
- Morningside Elementary School
- Nueva Vista Language Academy
- Pioneer School
- Princeton Street Elementary School
- Terrace Elementary School

=== Middle schools ===
- Almond Tree Middle School
- Cecil Avenue Math and Science Academy
- La Vina Middle School

=== High schools ===
- Delano High School
- Cesar E. Chavez High School
- Robert F. Kennedy High School
- Valley High School
- Delano Adult School

=== College ===
Bakersfield College, a community college, serves the community of Delano and the rural communities of northern Kern and southern Tulare counties with a satellite campus at the Delano Center, approximately 35 miles north of the main campus in Bakersfield, California.

== Transportation ==
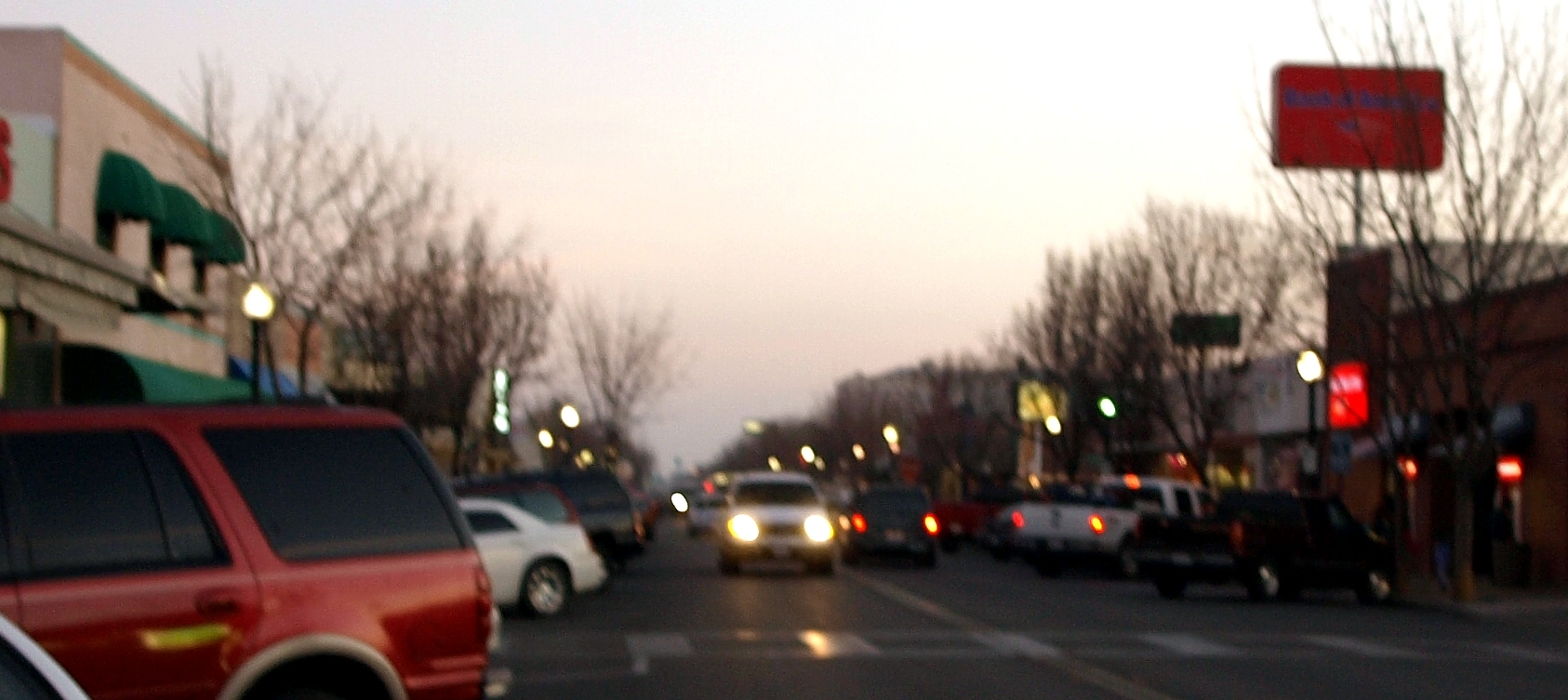
Main Street in downtown Delano

=== Bus services ===
The Delano Area Rapid Transit (DART) provides fixed route bus service on four routes and demand responsive public transportation service (Dial-A- Ride) to the residents of Delano and the immediate county area surrounding the city within the boundaries of State Route 43 to the west, County Line Road to the north, Pond Road to the south, and Kyte Avenue to the east.

=== Airport ===
The Delano Municipal Airport is an uncontrolled airfield with a 5,651-foot (1,722 m) runway and light aviation services, and is open to the public. There is no scheduled airline service, but the airport serves a variety of other significant users. Many military, air charter, air ambulance, and other flying services operate from the airport on a regular basis.

== Events ==
The Cinco de Mayo Fiesta celebrates Mexican culture with live entertainment and a carnival at Memorial Park. This four-day celebration commemorates Cinco de Mayo.

Delano is home to the Annual Philippine Weekend festival which celebrates Filipino Culture through performing arts and cultural activities. The festival aims to continue the preservation of the art and history of the Philippines. The festival includes a pork adobo cook-off, grand parade, barrio fiesta, basketball tournament, cultural entertainment, live performance, dance and singing contest, and bingo.

September 16 Celebration

Harvest Holidays off with a golf tournament, softball tournament and 10k run. The Grand Marshal and Queen barbecue is held on Saturday after the Kiddie Parade. Furthermore, the city of Delano, in addition to the Delano Union Elementary School District, host the Harvest Holidays Kiddie Parade, which allows the young ones to be the stars for a day as they wave to the crowds down Main Street. The four day event ends with carnival rides, games, food, and music at Memorial Park.

Christmas Parade

== Recreation ==
The nearby Sequoia National Forest includes a vast number of Giant Sequoia groves, impressive granite monoliths, scenic canyons and meadows. The Tule Elk State Reserve provides protection to the Tule elk which in the past were in danger of extinction. Lake Woollomes is a popular location. The Kern National Wildlife Refuge is nearby. The Shirley Meadows Ski Area, located on Green Horn Mountain provides skiing opportunities. The nearby Kern River and Isabella Lake are popular during the summer.

=== Community parks ===
The city of Delano has thirteen parks for families and children to enjoy:

- Albany Park
- Cecil Park
- Cesar Chavez Park
- Delano Soccer Park
- Delano Skate Park
- Heritage Park
- Jefferson Park
- Kalibo Park
- Larry Itliong Park
- Martin Luther King Jr. Park
- Memorial Park
- Morningside Park
- Veneto Park

== Notable people ==
- Cesar Chavez, activist
- Larry Itliong, activist
- Leamon King, Olympic runner
- Dack Rambo, actor
- Lon Spurrier, Olympic runner
- Luis Valdez, film director, known for La Bamba
- Benita Valente, classical singer (soprano)

== Sister cities ==
Delano has four sister cities, as designated by Sister Cities International:

- Arida, Japan
- Asti, Italy
- Jacona, Michoacan, Mexico
- Kalibo, Philippines

== See also ==
- Delano Record
