= North Kern State Prison =

Prison in Delano, California

North Kern State Prison (NKSP)
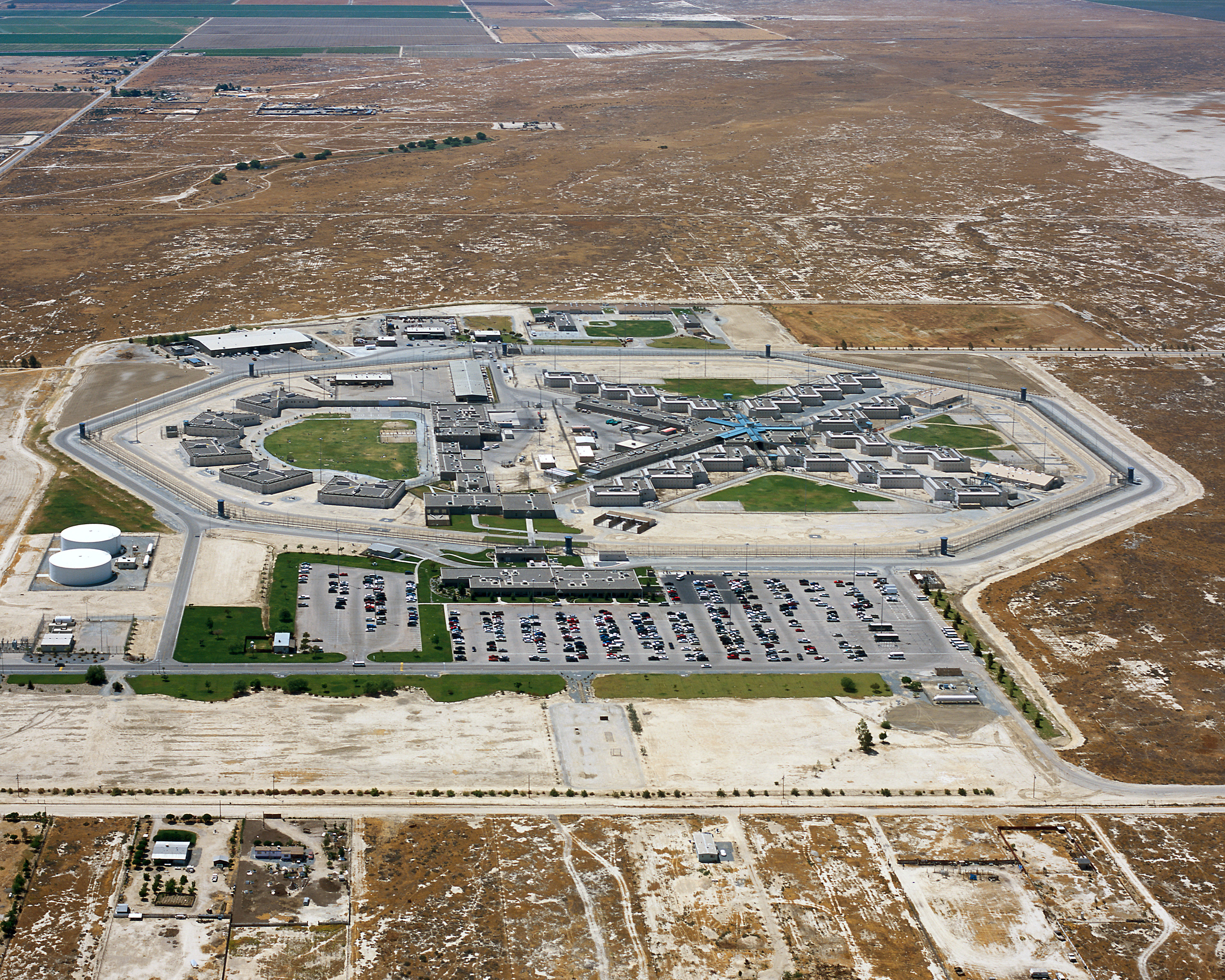
- Interactive map of North Kern State Prison (NKSP)
- Location: Delano, California; 35.7819°N 119.3095°W
- Status: Operational
- Security class: Medium
- Capacity: 2,694
- Population: 4,380 (162.6% capacity) (January 31, 2023)
- Opened: April 1993
- Managed by: California Department of Corrections and Rehabilitation
- Warden: Kevin Hixon

North Kern State Prison (NKSP) is a medium-security prison located in Delano, Kern County, California. Opened in April 1993, this state prison has a design capacity of 2,694 incarcerated people. North Kern serves as a reception center for incoming inmates. Inmates usually serve two to three months at North Kern while staff processes their criminal and health records and assesses their physiological and social needs before assigning them to another prison. While at North Kern, inmates have opportunities to engage in educational programs. With North Kern State Prison and Kern Valley State Prison, which is located one mile away and houses approximately 3,500 inmates, Kern County has one of the largest prison populations of any county in America.

== History ==
Location of Delano in Kern County, and Kern County in California

In the early 1990s, California experienced a significant growth in the number of inmates. Many rural counties lobbied to house a prison because of the health care and job opportunities that a prison provides for its employees. Delano was one of the cities in the counties. Since North Kern State Prison opened in 1993, the city has grown immensely. Before the two prisons were built, Delano was a rural city with a large migrant farm-worker population. The construction of the two prisons helped the small city develop into a more urban society. Delano benefited from the new sewage system being built as well as new electrical infrastructure, and spurred retail and housing development.

== Facilities ==
North Kern is an all-male facility with a design capacity of 2,694. As of 21 July 2022, North Kern was incarcerating people at 152.1% of its design capacity, with 4,100 occupants. Of these, a majority are housed in the Reception Center (RC) waiting to be transferred to another state prison and approximately 1,400 inmates live in the mainline part of the prison. Inmates are separated by security and custody levels upon arriving at North Kern.

There are five facilities or "yards" at this prison: Facility A, B, C, D, and Minimum (formerly E). A yard possesses 800–1,000 level 3 mainline inmates. Yards B–D are RC yards. The Minimum yard possesses 100–200 level 1 inmates who work and live in a less secure housing unit located outside the main facility. In the event of a lockdown, Minimum yard inmates will come into the main prison to provide support services. During regular operating procedure, mainline A yard inmates provide support services throughout the prison, for example, kitchen, laundry, education, and library. A and D yard inmates live in cell housing units while yards B, C, and Minimum reside in dorm housing units. In addition to holding a job at the prison, mainline inmates are eligible for education and reentry programs.

Inmates housed in the Reception Center (RC) typically spend two to three months at North Kern before being transferred to another prison. They stay behind the electrical fence and, if approved, may help run support services. North Kern has four cellblocks with each cellblock having its own yard. All cells are double-bunked. Most RC inmates are designated as custody level four, and reside in cells; some lower-custody inmates stay in dorms.

Overcrowding is a day-to-day reality, hence the double bunked cells. The sewage system was also not built for such a large population, leading to periodic toxic spills. A grinder and a backup sewage system were installed a few years after the prison opened to crush the excess trash and help the sewage system run more efficiently.

Three fences surround North Kern: two razor wire fences with an electric fence in the middle. Several towers are stationed around the prison to reinforce the fence line.

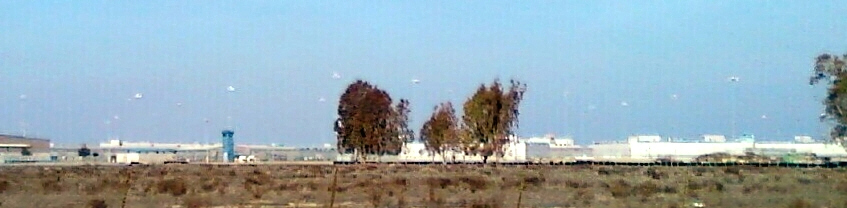
NKSP, as seen from W. Cecil Ave., is situated among farm lands and open fields.

== Programs ==
North Kern offers a variety of programs to the inmates. Since most inmates coming into prison do not have a high school education, GED classes are offered. As of 2013, North Kern offers no vocational training programs.

== Incidents ==
North Kern has experienced frequent racial tension. The two preeminent gangs are the Sureños and the Paisas (Mexican nationals).

On October 1, 2007, an inmate escaped from the institution. The inmate, 29-year-old Abelardo Morales, was reported missing from the Level I yard of the prison at 9:17 p.m. Morales was serving a one-year, six-month term for manufacture and sales of narcotics, and possession of a weapon.

On the night of April 21, 2015, a guard walking a yard at North Kern State Prison was struck by gunfire, which penetrated his stab-proof vest. He was taken to a hospital with minor injuries. Authorities believe the gunman was outside the prison walls when the shots were fired.

== Visitation ==
The number of visitation hours for which each inmate is eligible depends on his security and custody level. Inmates with few infractions are allowed to have visits more often and longer. The mainline inmates are allowed to have human contact visits as well as conjugal visits but only from their spouses. The RC inmates must have their visits behind glass.

== Notable inmates ==
Inmate Name	Register Number	Status	Details
Danny Masterson		Serving a 30 year sentence for sexual assault. Will be eligible for parole in June 2042.	Former American actor who was convicted of raping 2 women.
Tory Lanez		Sentenced to 10 years in 2023 for shooting and injuring Megan Thee Stallion	Famous Canadian Hip-Hop artist

- Joseph James DeAngelo- Serial killer known as the Golden State Killer sentenced to life imprisonment for 13 counts of murder and kidnapping. Started his sentence at NKSP before being moved to CSP-COR.
- Ramon Escobar- Serial killer sentenced to life imprisonment for 3 counts of murder and 7 counts of attempted second degree murder. Strangled his cell mate to death while serving time at NKSP. Transferred to CSP-SAC.
