= Pond, California =

Unincorporated community in California, United States

Pond
- Unincorporated community
- Location in California Pond (the United States)
- Coordinates: 35°43′04″N 119°19′43″W
- Country: United States
- State: California
- County: Kern
- Elevation: 282 ft (86 m)

Pond is an unincorporated community in Kern County, California, United States. It is located 8.5 miles (14 km) north of Wasco, at an elevation of 282 feet (86 m).

Pond was established circa 1889. A post office opened at Pond in 1912.

Merle Haggard's song "The Train Never Stops At Our Town," was written by nearby Bakersfield resident, Dallas Frazier, about the struggle of life in Pond, and how difficult it was to leave the "Poor Man's Valley" (San Joaquin Valley) compounded by the fact the train did not stop in Pond.
