= Delano Joint Union High School District =

Public school district in California

Address
- 1720 Norwalk Street Delano, Kern County, California, 93215-1456; United States

District information
- Type: Public high school district
- Grades: 9-12
- Established: 1911; 115 years ago
- Superintendent: Jason Garcia
- Schools: 4
- Budget: $78,927,000
- NCES District ID: 0610860
- District ID: CA-1563412

Students and staff
- Students: 4,142
- Teachers: 180.06 (on an FTE basis)
- Staff: 257.53 (on an FTE basis)
- Student–teacher ratio: 23:1

Other information
- Website: www.djuhsd.org

Delano Joint Union High School District (DJUHSD) is a public school district based in Kern County, California, United States.

In Kern County, the district includes Delano. The district extends into Tulare County. There, it includes Allensworth, Earlimart, Jovista, Richgrove, and Rodriguez Camp, as well as most of Teviston.

== Schools ==
- Cesar E. Chavez High School
- Delano High School
- Robert F. Kennedy High School
- Valley High School

Other programs:

- Child Development Program
- Delano Adult School
