= Vallarta Supermarkets =

American supermarket chain

- Company type: Private
- Industry: Retail
- Founded: 1985; 41 years ago
- Founder: Enrique Gonzalez
- Headquarters: Santa Clarita, California
- Number of locations: 55
- Area served: California
- Website: https://vallartasupermarkets.com/en/

Vallarta Supermarkets Inc. is an American supermarket chain. It is based in Santa Clarita, California. As of June 2024, the chain has 55 locations in California. The chain caters to the Latino communities of California and sells items usually not found in more Anglo-oriented American supermarkets. The chain's stores are concentrated in southern California but has several as far north as Stanislaus and Santa Cruz counties.

Vallarta Supermarkets was founded in 1985 by Mexican émigré Enrique Gonzalez.
