= 2024 in the United States =

- Decades: 2000s; 2010s; 2020s; 2030s
- See also: History of the United States (2016–present); Timeline of United States history (2010–present); List of years in the United States

The following is a list of events of the year 2024 in the United States.

With the dominant political story of the year being the 2024 presidential election, most American-focused media outlets routinely covered the nominees. Former president Donald Trump became the second president in American history to win two nonconsecutive terms, defeating Democratic vice president Kamala Harris, who became her party's nominee after incumbent president Joe Biden withdrew from the race. Much of the national media paid close attention to Trump's civil and criminal trials, as well as two assassination attempts on Trump: one in July (where his ear was injured) and one in September (thwarted by the Secret Service).

American politics also focused on responses to the Israel's ongoing war on Gaza that started in the year prior (particularly the protests on college campuses against Israel), recent developments in abortion policy, and the passing of a law that de jure banned TikTok in January of the following year.

The Federal Trade Commission, under chair Lina Khan, also played a more proactive role in the economics of the U.S., with Khan blocking many mergers and acquisitions, including one between airlines JetBlue and Spirit. In business, the American economy underwent a bull market, with Nvidia in particular, due to demand for its chips in the use of artificial intelligence, becoming the third largest publicly traded company by market capitalization, and partially enabling major American stock indices such as the S&P 500 to achieve record highs. Nvidia's success story, though, was contrasted by a series of safety failures, malfunctions, and crashes involving passenger aircraft designed and assembled by Boeing, among the most notable of which was Alaska Airlines Flight 1282 in which a door plug blew out. Additionally, Spirit Airlines, radio operator Audacy, for-profit hospital chain Steward Health Care System, retailers Jo-Ann Stores and rue21, restaurant chains Red Lobster and TGI Fridays, bussing company Coach USA, electric vehicle maker Fisker, and food storage container firm Tupperware have filed for Chapter 11 bankruptcy.

Several major hurricanes and tornado outbreaks occurred across the United States during the year, including the tornado outbreak sequence of May 19–27, Hurricane Helene, and Hurricane Milton.

== Incumbents ==
=== Federal government ===
- President: Joe Biden (D-Delaware)
- Vice President: Kamala Harris (D-California)
- Chief Justice: John Roberts (Maryland)
- Speaker of the House: Mike Johnson (R-Louisiana)
- Senate Majority Leader: Chuck Schumer (D-New York)
- Congress: 118th

==== State governments ====
Governors and lieutenant governors

=== Governors ===
- Governor of Alabama: Kay Ivey (Republican)
- Governor of Alaska: Mike Dunleavy (Republican)
- Governor of Arizona: Katie Hobbs (Democratic)
- Governor of Arkansas: Sarah Huckabee Sanders (Republican)
- Governor of California: Gavin Newsom (Democratic)
- Governor of Colorado: Jared Polis (Democratic)
- Governor of Connecticut: Ned Lamont (Democratic)
- Governor of Delaware: John Carney (Democratic)
- Governor of Florida: Ron DeSantis (Republican)
- Governor of Georgia: Brian Kemp (Republican)
- Governor of Hawaii: Josh Green (Democratic)
- Governor of Idaho: Brad Little (Republican)
- Governor of Illinois: J. B. Pritzker (Democratic)
- Governor of Indiana: Eric Holcomb (Republican)
- Governor of Iowa: Kim Reynolds (Republican)
- Governor of Kansas: Laura Kelly (Democratic)
- Governor of Kentucky: Andy Beshear (Democratic)
- Governor of Louisiana: John Bel Edwards (Democratic) (until January 8), Jeff Landry (Republican) (since January 8)
- Governor of Maine: Janet Mills (Democratic)
- Governor of Maryland: Wes Moore (Democratic)
- Governor of Massachusetts: Maura Healey (Democratic)
- Governor of Michigan: Gretchen Whitmer (Democratic)
- Governor of Mississippi: Tate Reeves (Republican)
- Governor of Missouri: Mike Parson (Republican)
- Governor of Minnesota: Tim Walz (Democratic)
- Governor of Montana: Greg Gianforte (Republican)
- Governor of Nebraska: Jim Pillen (Republican)
- Governor of Nevada: Joe Lombardo (Republican)
- Governor of New Hampshire: Chris Sununu (Republican)
- Governor of New Jersey: Phil Murphy (Democratic)
- Governor of New Mexico: Michelle Lujan Grisham (Democratic)
- Governor of New York: Kathy Hochul (Democratic)
- Governor of North Carolina: Roy Cooper (Democratic)
- Governor of North Dakota: Doug Burgum (Republican) (until December 15), Kelly Armstrong (Republican) (since December 15)
- Governor of Ohio: Mike DeWine (Republican)
- Governor of Oklahoma: Kevin Stitt (Republican)
- Governor of Oregon: Tina Kotek (Democratic)
- Governor of Pennsylvania: Josh Shapiro (Democratic)
- Governor of Rhode Island: Daniel McKee (Democratic)
- Governor of South Carolina: Henry McMaster (Republican)
- Governor of South Dakota: Kristi Noem (Republican)
- Governor of Tennessee: Bill Lee (Republican)
- Governor of Texas: Greg Abbott (Republican)
- Governor of Utah: Spencer Cox (Republican)
- Governor of Vermont: Phil Scott (Republican)
- Governor of Virginia: Glenn Youngkin (Republican)
- Governor of Washington: Jay Inslee (Democratic)
- Governor of West Virginia: Jim Justice (Republican)
- Governor of Wisconsin: Tony Evers (Democratic)
- Governor of Wyoming: Mark Gordon (Republican)

=== Lieutenant governors ===
- Lieutenant Governor of Alabama: Will Ainsworth (Republican)
- Lieutenant Governor of Alaska: Nancy Dahlstrom (Republican)
- Lieutenant Governor of Arkansas: Leslie Rutledge (Republican)
- Lieutenant Governor of California: Eleni Kounalakis (Democratic)
- Lieutenant Governor of Colorado: Dianne Primavera (Democratic)
- Lieutenant Governor of Connecticut: Susan Bysiewicz (Democratic)
- Lieutenant Governor of Delaware: Bethany Hall-Long (Democratic)
- Lieutenant Governor of Florida: Jeanette Nuñez (Republican)
- Lieutenant Governor of Georgia: Burt Jones (Republican)
- Lieutenant Governor of Hawaii: Sylvia Luke (Democratic)
- Lieutenant Governor of Idaho: Scott Bedke (Republican)
- Lieutenant Governor of Illinois: Juliana Stratton (Democratic)
- Lieutenant Governor of Indiana: Suzanne Crouch (Republican)
- Lieutenant Governor of Iowa:
  - Adam Gregg (Republican) (until September 3)
  - Amy Sinclair (Republican) (acting: September 3 – December 16)
  - Chris Cournoyer (Republican) (since December 16)
- Lieutenant Governor of Kansas: David Toland (Democratic)
- Lieutenant Governor of Kentucky: Jacqueline Coleman (Democratic)
- Lieutenant Governor of Louisiana: Billy Nungesser (Republican)
- Lieutenant Governor of Maryland: Aruna Miller (Democratic)
- Lieutenant Governor of Massachusetts: Kim Driscoll (Democratic)
- Lieutenant Governor of Michigan: Garlin Gilchrist (Democratic)
- Lieutenant Governor of Minnesota: Peggy Flanagan (Democratic)
- Lieutenant Governor of Mississippi: Delbert Hosemann (Republican)
- Lieutenant Governor of Missouri: Mike Kehoe (Republican)
- Lieutenant Governor of Montana: Kristen Juras (Republican)
- Lieutenant Governor of Nebraska:Joe Kelly (Republican)
- Lieutenant Governor of Nevada: Stavros Anthony (Democratic)
- Lieutenant Governor of New Jersey: Tahesha Way (Democratic)
- Lieutenant Governor of New Mexico: Howie Morales (Democratic)
- Lieutenant Governor of New York: Antonio Delgado (Democratic)
- Lieutenant Governor of North Carolina: Mark Robinson (Republican)
- Lieutenant Governor of North Dakota: Tammy Miller (Republican) (until December 15), Michelle Strinden (Republican) (since December 15)
- Lieutenant Governor of Ohio: Jon A. Husted (Republican)
- Lieutenant Governor of Oklahoma: Matt Pinnell (Republican)
- Lieutenant Governor of Pennsylvania: Austin Davis (Democratic)
- Lieutenant Governor of Rhode Island: Sabina Matos (Democratic)
- Lieutenant Governor of South Carolina: Pamela Evette (Republican)
- Lieutenant Governor of South Dakota: Larry Rhoden (Republican)
- Lieutenant Governor of Tennessee: Randy McNally (Republican)
- Lieutenant Governor of Texas: Dan Patrick (Republican)
- Lieutenant Governor of Utah: Deidre Henderson (Republican)
- Lieutenant Governor of Vermont: David Zuckerman (Progressive)
- Lieutenant Governor of Virginia: Winsome Earle-Sears (Republican)
- Lieutenant Governor of Washington: Denny Heck (Democratic)
- Lieutenant Governor of West Virginia: Craig Blair (Republican)
- Lieutenant Governor of Wisconsin: Sara Rodriguez (Democratic)

== Elections ==
The US general elections were held on November 5 of this year. In the federal government, the offices up for election were president, vice president, all 435 seats of the House of Representatives, and roughly one third of the Senate. In this year's presidential election, Joe Biden ran for a second term. With former president Donald Trump's declaration to run for the office again and both he and Biden were their respective parties' presumptive presidential nominees, the election would have been a rematch of the 2020 election. On July 21, 2024, however, President Biden announced his withdrawal from the presidential race and endorsed his vice president Kamala Harris as the Democratic nominee. In the Senate, at least seven seats, those of Senators Tom Carper from Delaware, Mike Braun from Indiana, Ben Cardin from Maryland, Debbie Stabenow from Michigan, Bob Menendez from New Jersey, Mitt Romney from Utah, and Joe Manchin from West Virginia, will be open contests; the seat of the late Dianne Feinstein is also expected to be an open contest with Feinstein's immediate successor, Laphonza Butler, expected not to seek a full term.

Concerning state governments, 11 states and two territories will hold gubernatorial elections, and most states and territories will hold elections for their legislatures. Many major cities, including Baltimore, Las Vegas, Honolulu, Milwaukee, Miami, Phoenix, San Diego, and San Francisco will also elect their mayors.

=== Special elections ===
- February 13 – Republican George Santos was expelled from the House of Representatives in December 2023 after an investigation for corruption charges, vacating New York's 3rd congressional district. In the special election, Democrat Tom Suozzi reclaimed his former seat against Republican Mazi Melesa Pilip, flipping the swing district and narrowing the margin of Republican control in Congress.
- April 30 – A special election was held in New York's 26th congressional district after Brian Higgins resigned to become president of Shea's Performing Arts Center in Buffalo. Democrat Tim Kennedy was elected to succeed him.
- May 21 – Republican Kevin McCarthy, who was ousted from his position as speaker of the House in October 2023, resigned from Congress at the end of the year. In the special election for California's 20th congressional district, Republican Vince Fong defeated fellow Republican Mike Boudreaux in a runoff to succeed McCarthy.
- June 11 – A special election was held for Ohio's 6th congressional district following the resignation of Bill Johnson, who accepted the position of president of Youngstown State University. Republican Michael Rulli defeated Democrat Michael Kripchak by a smaller margin than expected.
- June 25 – A special election was held for Colorado's 4th congressional district after Republican Ken Buck resigned early after initially announcing his retirement at the end of the term. Republican Greg Lopez won the election against Democrat Trisha Calvarese and Libertarian Hannah Goodman.
- September 18 – Democrat Donald Payne Jr. of New Jersey's 10th congressional district died in April 2024 following a heart attack caused by complications of diabetes. Democrat LaMonica McIver defeated Republican Carmen Bucco in the special election for the fully urban district.
- November 5
  - Following the death of California senator Dianne Feinstein in September 2023, governor Gavin Newsom called for a special election to be held concurrently with the scheduled regular election for the same seat. Democrat Adam Schiff and Republican Steve Garvey advanced to the general election through a nonpartisan blanket primary.
  - Nebraska will hold a special election for its Class 2 Senate seat following the resignation of Ben Sasse in January 2023 to serve as president of the University of Florida. Incumbent Republican senator Pete Ricketts, who was appointed by Governor Jim Pillen, is running for a full term and will face Democrat Preston Love Jr. in the general election.
  - Democrat Sheila Jackson Lee died from pancreatic cancer in July 2024 while serving her 15th term in Texas's 18th congressional district. The sole Democratic candidate for the special election is Erica Lee Carter, the daughter of Jackson Lee.
  - Republican Mike Gallagher, who chaired the recently formed House Select Committee on China, resigned from Congress in April 2024 over his opposition to the impeachment of Homeland Security secretary Alejandro Mayorkas. The special election for Wisconsin's 8th congressional district will be held between Republican Tony Wied and Democrat Kristin Lyerly.

== Events ==
=== January ===
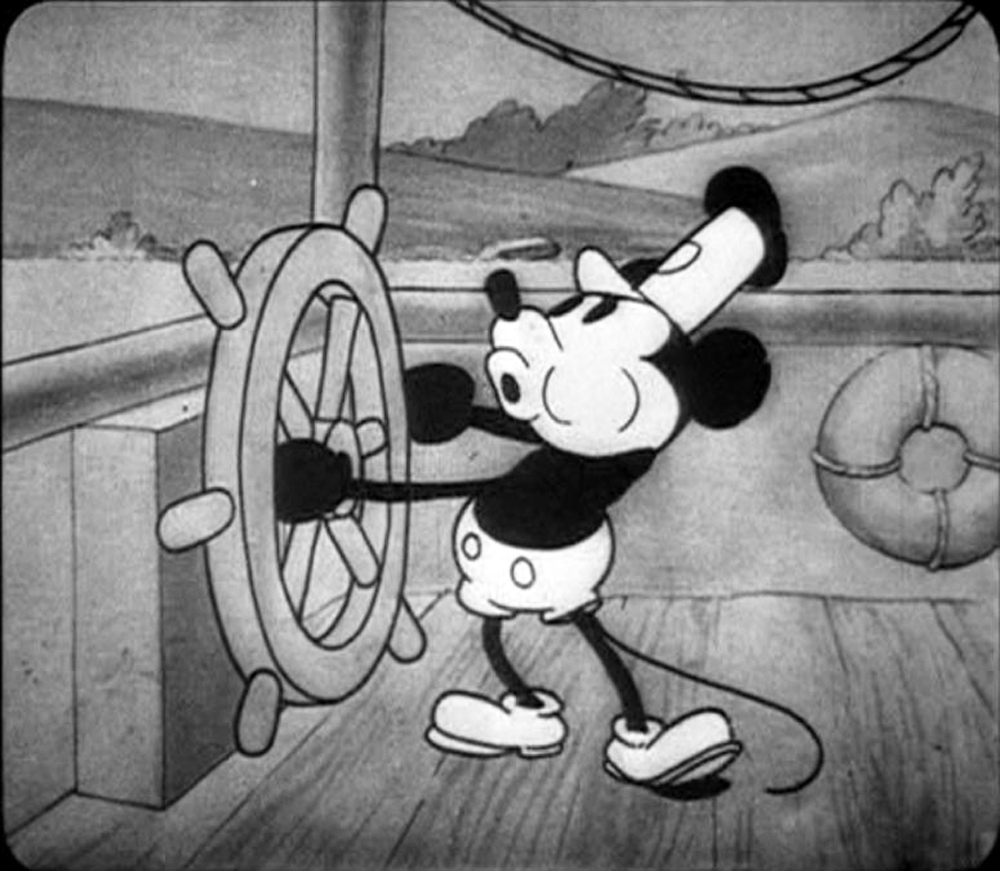
The famous cartoon of Mickey Mouse, Steamboat Willie enters public domain

Protesters in Washington D.C. calling for the ceasefire of the Gaza War at the March on Washington for Gaza protests

The site of the collapsed First Church of Christ in New London, Connecticut

- January 1
  - Public Domain Day: Books, films, and other works published in 1928 enter the public domain. The most notable work entering into the public domain is Steamboat Willie, the earliest version of Mickey Mouse, leading to the announcement of multiple works based on this version of the character.
  - Four people, including the perpetrator, are killed in a vehicle attack in Rochester, New York.
- January 2 – Harvard University president Claudine Gay announces her resignation following a contentious house hearing on antisemitism and allegations of plagiarism in her earlier academic career.
- January 3 – A series of documents containing the names of associates of sex offender Jeffrey Epstein are made available to the public. A majority of those mentioned are found to not be directly involved in any wrongdoing.
- January 4
  - Criminal proceedings in the January 6 United States Capitol attack: Former Proud Boys member Christopher John Worrell is sentenced to 10 years in prison.
  - Two people are killed and six others are injured in a school shooting in Perry, Iowa. The shooter, a 17-year-old student at the school, committed suicide at the scene. A principal who tried to intervene and was shot later died from his injuries on January 14.
- January 5 – Alaska Airlines Flight 1282 suffers an uncontrolled decompression after one of the emergency exit doors on the Boeing 737 MAX 9 blows out, resulting in an emergency landing in Portland and the FAA grounding all 737 Max 9s.
- January 7 – Audacy, the largest radio operator in the country, files for Chapter 11 bankruptcy protection.
- January 8
  - Clashes break out at the World Headquarters of the Chabad-Lubavitch movement in Brooklyn, New York City after construction workers for the synagogue leaders attempted to fill in a tunnel that students had illegally dug beneath the building, resulting in the arrest of nine people. The incident causes antisemitic social media posts by far-right and QAnon figures to spread online.
  - The Michigan Wolverines defeat the Washington Huskies by a score of 34–13 to win the College Football Playoff National Championship.
- January 8–10 – A storm complex, which caused $2.7 billion (2024 USD) in damage, brought a winter storm to the northern United States and a tornado outbreak to the Gulf Coast.
- January 10
  - Former New Jersey governor Chris Christie suspends his 2024 campaign for president.
  - Florida-based grocer Publix opens their first Kentucky store near the Gene Snyder Freeway in Louisville, entering their 8th U.S. state of operation.
- January 11
  - The New England Patriots mutually part ways with longtime head coach Bill Belichick after a notably poor season for the team.
  - The Texas National Guard seizes a park in the border town of Eagle Pass, Texas in response to the growing Mexico–United States border crisis and does not allow Border Patrol agents in the area as they previously used the park to detain migrants and instead places their own barbed wire and barriers.
- January 12
  - Operation Prosperity Guardian: A US-led coalition launches air strikes at Houthi militant locations in Yemen, marking a retaliation to the Houthi's attacks on ships in the Red Sea.
  - Heartland Signal leaks a video of Texas Governor Greg Abbott making controversial comments about Texas shooting migrants who cross the Mexico–United States border on a Dana Loesch Show which lead to condemnations from Democratic party members and Mexico.
- January 13 – Gaza war protests in the United States: The March on Washington for Gaza takes place on the 100th day since the start of the Gaza war, the start of South Africa's genocide case against Israel in the ICJ, and a day after the Yemen missile strikes, attracting what is believed to be over 100,000 protestors.
- January 14
  - The Detroit Lions win their first postseason game since the 1991–92 playoffs with a 24–23 win against the Los Angeles Rams.
  - The Green Bay Packers become the first 7th seed to defeat a 2nd seed in the playoffs since its introduction in the 2020–21 playoffs.
- January 15 – 2024 Republican Party presidential primaries: Ohio businessman Vivek Ramaswamy ends his presidential campaign after securing only 7.7% of the vote in the Iowa caucuses. Former Governor of Arkansas Asa Hutchinson ends his campaign the next day after receiving less than 1% of the vote in the same.
- January 16 – Harvey Weinstein sexual abuse cases: A new lawsuit is filed by Kellye Croft against Madison Square Garden Entertainment chairman James L. Dolan, accusing him of pressuring her into unwanted sex back in 2014. She also files a lawsuit against American former film producer Harvey Weinstein, accusing him of sexually assaulting her.
- January 18 – The United States Congress approves a stopgap bill to extend the deadline for government funding to March 2024, narrowly avoiding a government shutdown, which would have begun at midnight, January 19.
- January 19 – Alec Baldwin is indicted for involuntary manslaughter after an accidental shooting on the set of Rust in 2021 which killed cinematographer Halyna Hutchins and injured director Joel Souza.
- January 20 – At least 60 people are killed across the country after two weeks of winter storms that caused dangerous road conditions and widespread power outages that could take weeks to fix.
- January 21
  - 2024 Republican Party presidential primaries: Governor of Florida Ron DeSantis suspends his campaign for president after a poor showing in Iowa and waning poll numbers in New Hampshire.
  - A series of shootings take place around Joliet, Illinois, killing eight and injuring one. Two days later, the perpetrator takes his own life after being confronted by law enforcement in Natalia, Texas.
- January 24 – During the Standoff at Eagle Pass, part of the broader Mexico–United States border crisis, the Supreme Court rules against Texas for placing barbed wire at the border with Mexico. In response, Texas Governor Greg Abbott announces that his state would not be following the orders of the court. At least 23 states announce their allegiance to Texas, including Florida, who has sent their own National Guard unit to aid the Texas National Guard and Texas Rangers.
- January 25
  - Convicted murderer Kenneth Smith is executed in the Holman Correctional Facility in Alabama, using nitrogen hypoxia, the first death row inmate to die via this method.
  - The United States Department of Commerce issues a $15 million bounty for information on Hossein Hatefi Ardakani, an Iranian businessman accused of procuring parts for drones assembled by Iran's Islamic Revolutionary Guard Corps that were later sold to Russia.
  - The 150 ft (46 m) tall steeple of the First Church of Christ (also referred to as the First Congregational Church) in New London, Connecticut collapses onto its roof, destroying most of the building. No one was killed or injured in the collapse.
- January 26
  - In E. Jean Carroll v. Donald J. Trump, the jury awards Carroll $83.3 million after finding the defendant guilty of defamation.
  - The Justice Department finds former New York Governor Andrew Cuomo liable for sexual harassment.
  - AWS announced plans to break ground on two large data center facilities in Mississippi, marking a $10 billion investment expected to create 1,000 jobs.
- January 27 – The US suspends UNRWA funds after claims come out that 12 staff members took part in the October 7 attacks in 2023, which included American victims.
- January 28 – Tower 22 drone attack – An Iranian-backed militant group launches a drone attack on a US base in Jordan, killing three and wounding 47. The US launches several missiles at Iraq and Syria in retaliation for the drone attack four days later.

=== February ===
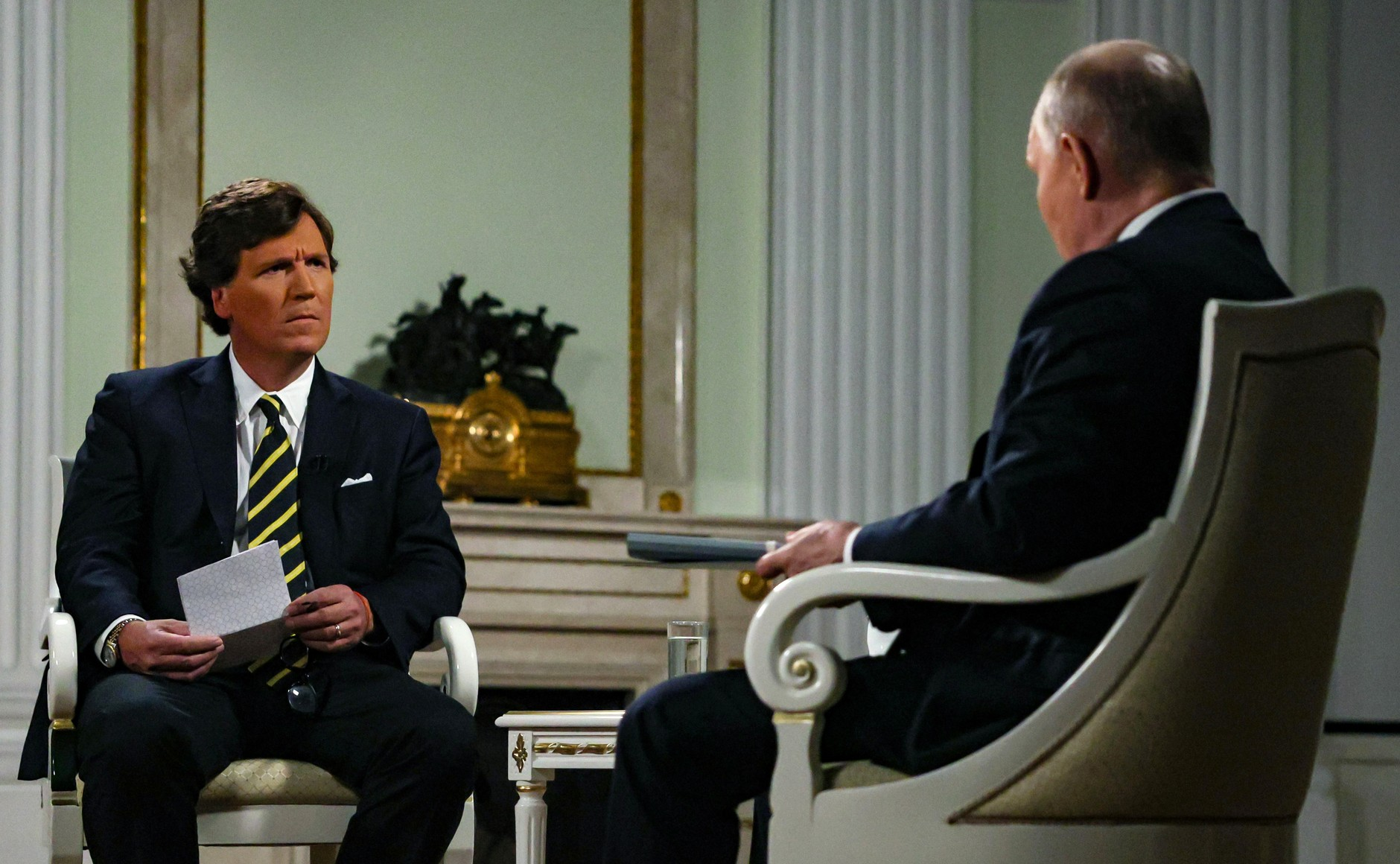
American right wing political commentator and journalist Tucker Carlson interviews Russian president Vladimir Putin

- February 1
  - Gaza war: The US imposes sanctions on Israeli settlers over the violence in West Bank.
  - Three people are killed when a Beechcraft Bonanza V35 crashes into a waterfront house in Clearwater, Florida. Two of the casualties are on the ground while the third is the pilot. Three other houses are damaged by a fire which results from the crash.
  - The Oregon Supreme Court upholds Ballot Measure 113 by banning ten of the 12 Republican members of the Oregon Senate for refusing to attend six weeks worth of legislative sessions in order to stall Democratic legislation.
- February 4
  - The 66th Annual Grammy Awards are held at the Crypto.com Arena in Los Angeles. "Flowers" by Miley Cyrus wins Record of the Year and Midnights by Taylor Swift wins Album of the Year.
  - The schedule for the 2026 FIFA World Cup, which will be co-hosted by the US, Canada, and Mexico, is released. A total of 78 games will be played in the US, including the final.
- February 6
  - Social media network Bluesky, seen as a potential rival to X, is opened for public registrations, dropping its previous invite-only format.
  - Toyota announced a $1.3 billion investment in a new Kentucky factory for a three-row electric SUV and EV battery packs.
- February 7
  - Self-help author Marianne Williamson ends her presidential campaign after losing three Democratic primaries to President Biden.
  - 2024 East Lansdowne shooting: At least six members of a family are presumed dead in a house fire in East Lansdowne, Pennsylvania following a shooting which injured two police officers.
  - Children's Health and UT Southwestern Medical Center announced plans for a $5 billion campus in the Medical District near Clements University Hospital in Dallas, Texas.
- February 8
  - Five US Marines are found dead two days after the CH-53E Super Stallion helicopter they were in crashed in the mountains outside of San Diego during a routine training flight from Creech Air Force Base to Marine Corps Air Station Miramar.
  - Joe Biden classified documents incident: Special counsel Robert K. Hur recommends that no charges be brought against President Biden, though notes in Hur's report regarding Biden's failure to recall events prompt controversy regarding his age and memory.
  - Tucker Carlson conducts The Vladimir Putin Interview in Moscow, where Vladimir Putin shares his reasons for the 2022 Russian Invasion of Ukraine. The interview is accused of promoting Russian disinformation and pro-war propaganda.
  - Sixteen-year-old non-binary Oklahoma student Nex Benedict dies after an incident stemming from repeated bullying at their high school due to their gender identity. This results in backlash towards Ryan Walters, the Oklahoma Superintendent of Public Instruction who has defended Oklahoma's anti-LGBT policies, and calls to investigate Nex's death as a hate crime.
- February 9
  - Six people, including CEO of Access Bank Herbert Wigwe and former chair of the Nigerian Exchange Group Abimbola Ogunbanjo, are killed when their helicopter crashes near Baker, California en route to Las Vegas for Super Bowl LVIII.
  - Hop-A-Jet Flight 823 suffers a dual engine failure en route from Columbus, Ohio to Naples, Florida and attempts to land on Interstate 75, but this destroys the aircraft and kills the two pilots, though the two passengers and one flight attendant survive.
- February 11 – The Kansas City Chiefs win Super Bowl LVIII against the San Francisco 49ers 25–22 in overtime at Allegiant Stadium in Las Vegas, the second Super Bowl to go into overtime after Super Bowl LI. The Chiefs are the first repeat champions since the New England Patriots in 2004.
- February 12 – A shooting takes place on a 4 Train and at Mount Eden Avenue station in New York City, killing one and injuring five.
- February 13 – Secretary of Homeland Security Alejandro Mayorkas is impeached by the House of Representatives.
- February 14 – 2024 Kansas City parade shooting: One person is killed and at least nine are injured after a mass shooting during the Kansas City Chiefs' Super Bowl LVIII championship parade at Union Station in Kansas City, Missouri. Two armed suspects were arrested at the scene.
- February 15
  - The US launches six missile-detecting satellites into orbit in response to a "serious national security threat" related to Russia wanting to implement its nuclear capabilities in outer space.
  - Odysseus, the first US lunar lander since the unsuccessful Peregrine Mission One, is launched at the Kennedy Space Center Florida, United States.
  - Scout Motors announced the start of construction on its $2 billion electric SUV plant in South Carolina.
- February 16
  - New York civil investigation of The Trump Organization: Judge Arthur Engoron orders Trump and his companies to pay $355 million ($464 million after interest is added) as a result of being found liable for several counts of fraud. Additionally, his sons Donald Jr. and Eric are ordered to each pay $4 million and former chief financial officer Allen Weisselberg is ordered to pay $1 million. Ten days later, Trump files an appeal of the judge's holding in the case.
  - An official committee that was appointed to represent the plaintiffs in the Sandy Hook lawsuits against Alex Jones unanimously votes to liquidate the far-right-wing conspiracy theorist's assets.
- February 17 – Former congressman George Santos sues late night host Jimmy Kimmel for $750,000 on charges of copyright infringement, fraud, breach of contract, and unjust enrichment after Kimmel purchased Cameo videos from Santos through fake names then used them on his show.
- February 18 – 2024 Burnsville shooting: Police and medics were fired upon from a home while responding to a domestic incident in Burnsville, Minnesota. Two officers and a firefighter were killed, while another officer suffered a gunshot wound. After opening fire on first responders, the shooter fatally shot himself.
- February 19 – The 2024 Daytona 500 is held with William Byron of Axalta's racing team winning.
- February 20 – Three passengers who were on Alaska Airlines Flight 1282 sue Boeing for $1 billion for negligence, claiming the incident caused them physical injuries and post-traumatic stress disorder.
- February 21
  - Biden cancels another $1.2 billion of student loan debts for nearly 153,000 people.
  - Capital One announces an agreement to acquire Discover Financial and its namesake credit card network for nearly $35 billion.
  - LePage v. Center for Reproductive Medicine: The Alabama Supreme Court rules that frozen embryos can be considered children under state law.
  - A ransomware attack cripples Change Healthcare's payment system, disrupting insurance claims and making it difficult for patients to get the prescription medicine that they need.
- February 22
  - AT&T suffers from network outages impacting around 71,000 customers, which also affect Verizon and T-Mobile to a smaller degree. The outages were acknowledged, but no reason was given for their occurrence. Two days later, AT&T announced affected customers will be credited $5 on their next bill, the "average cost of a full day of service."
  - Houston-based Intuitive Machines' Nova-C lander becomes the first commercial vehicle to land on the Moon.
  - Augusta University student Laken Riley is murdered while out on a jog by Jose Antonio Ibarra, a 26-year-old Venezuelan citizen who entered illegally in 2022. Her murder sparks media attention and debates about immigration.
- February 23
  - The Biden administration announces over 500 new sanctions on Russian financial institutions, military institutions, sanctions evasion, energy production, and prison officials linked to the death of Alexei Navalny.
  - A high-altitude balloon is detected over Utah, prompting the deployment of fighter aircraft to intercept the object. The origin and purpose of the balloon are unknown, according to US officials.
- February 25 – Gaza war protests in the United States: An Air Force member, identified as Aaron Bushnell, commits self-immolation in front of the Embassy of Israel in DC, as a protest against American support of Israel's war against Hamas. He later died of his injuries.
- February 26 – The body of Mahogany Jackson is discovered in an illegal dump site in Birmingham, Alabama.
- February 27 – The Smokehouse Creek Fire in the Texas panhandle burns almost 200,000 acres, resulting in a state of emergency for the area.
- February 28 – Mitch McConnell announces that he will step down as Senate Republican leader in January 2025. He's been serving as the Senate Republican leader since 2007.

=== March ===
American arts and crafts retail chain Jo-Ann Fabrics files for chapter 11 bankruptcy

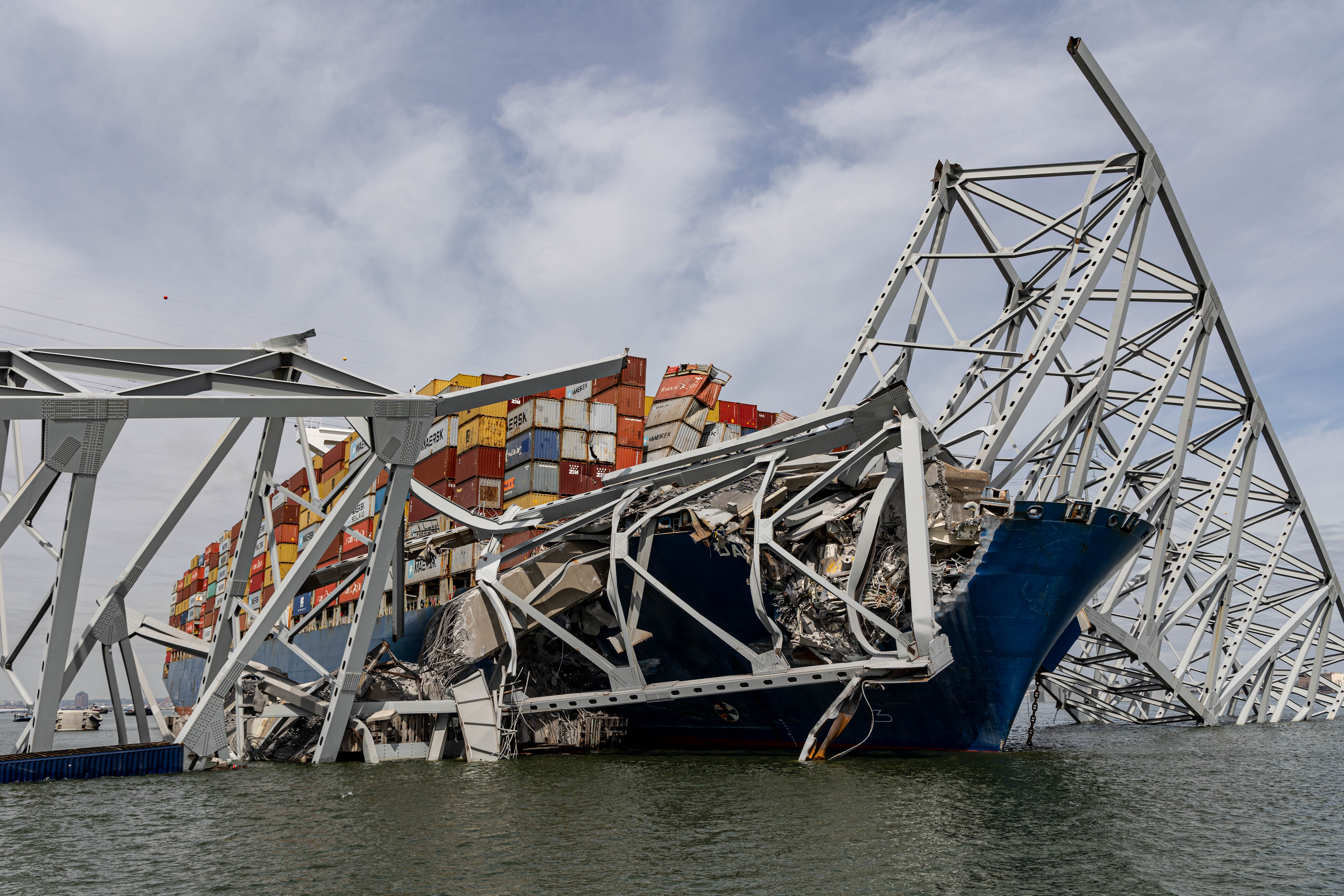
The Francis Scott Key Bridge in Baltimore, Maryland collapses after a container ship struck one of the bridges piers

- March 2 – United States support for Israel in the Gaza war: The United States military announces plans to begin airdropping humanitarian aid into Gaza.
- March 3 – Caitlin Clark breaks the all-time NCAA Division I college basketball career scoring record that had been held by Pete Maravich with 3,685 points.
- March 4
  - In Trump v. Anderson, the US Supreme Court unanimously rules that states can not keep presidential candidates off the ballot, overturning the Colorado Supreme Court's decision in Anderson v. Griswold.
  - 2022–2023 Pentagon document leaks: Jack Teixeira, a 22-year-old former member of the Massachusetts Air National Guard, pleads guilty to leaking classified Defense Department documents on his Discord server and is sentenced to 16 years and eight months in prison.
  - A Piper PA-32A crashes on I-40 while attempting to land at John C. Tune Airport in Nashville after suffering a mechanical failure. All five passengers on board are killed.
- March 5
  - The Consumer Financial Protection Bureau issues a new rule capping late fees for credit cards at $8, per Biden's Executive Order on Promoting Competition in the American Economy.
  - Louisiana Governor Jeff Landry signs a bill that adds nitrogen gas and electrocution as execution methods.
- March 6
  - 2024 United States presidential election: Former UN Ambassador and South Carolina governor Nikki Haley suspends her 2024 campaign for President after a poor showing on Super Tuesday, leaving Trump the presumptive Republican nominee. Minnesota Representative Dean Phillips also ends his campaign for the Democratic nomination after losing several primaries to President Biden.
- March 7 – President Biden delivers his third State of the Union Address.
- March 8
  - A highway crash near Dewhurst, Wisconsin involving a van and a semi-tractor kills nine people and injures one.
  - A UH-72 Lakota helicopter crashes while conducting an aviation operation 41 miles west of McAllen, Texas, killing one border patrol agent and two National Guard soldiers and injuring another.
  - Former Honduran president Juan Orlando Hernández is found guilty in a Manhattan court of conspiring with drug traffickers and enabling the transportation of over 400 tons of cocaine from Honduras to the US.
- March 9 – Utah adopts its new state flag, 113 years after the adoption of its former flag.
- March 10
  - The 96th Academy Awards are held at the Dolby Theatre in Los Angeles. Christopher Nolan's Oppenheimer is nominated for 13 awards and wins seven, including Best Picture. The ceremony draws an average of 19.5 million viewers, a 4% increase from the previous year.
  - Five people are killed during a mass stabbing and murder–suicide in Manoa, Honolulu.
  - An IAI 1125 Astra SP crashes while on approach to Ingalls Field Airport in Hot Springs, Virginia. All five people on board are killed.
- March 13 – The United States deploys a Marine Corps Security Force Regiment platoon to secure the U.S. embassy complex in Port-au-Prince, Haiti and evacuate embassy staff and other Americans citizens amid the ongoing gang war crisis in the country.
- March 13–15 – A significant early spring tornado outbreak occurred throughout the Midwestern and Northeastern United States, with the most significant impacts occurring in Indiana and Ohio. The outbreak produced 34 tornadoes and caused $5.9 billion (2024 USD) in damage.
- March 14 – SpaceX successfully launches the first Starship rocket, the most powerful rocket ever built, at the Starbase launch site in Boca Chica, Texas after two previous failed attempts. However, the vehicle is lost during reentry.
- March 16 – A gunman kills three people in Falls Township, Pennsylvania and escapes in a stolen car. The suspect subsequently travels to Trenton, New Jersey, where he barricades himself with several hostages.
- March 18 – Jo-Ann Stores files for chapter 11 bankruptcy after accumulating over $1 billion in debt.
- March 19
  - In United States v. Texas, the Supreme Court declines to block a Texas Senate bill allowing officials to arrest and deport migrants.
  - Former Mississippi sheriff's deputy Hunter Edward is sentenced to a 20-year term of imprisonment for his role in torturing two African-American men in January 2023.
- March 20 – The Biden administration announces new vehicle emission standards for 2027–2032, as it pushes for wider adoption of hybrid and electric vehicles.
- March 21 – A man identified as Richard Slayman receives a kidney from a genetically engineered pig at Massachusetts General Hospital in Boston. This medical breakthrough could see the end of dialysis treatment.
- March 26
  - The Francis Scott Key Bridge in Baltimore partially collapses after the large Singaporean cargo ship MV Dali collides with it. Six people are reported missing and presumed dead.
  - Abortion in the United States: The Supreme Court announces that it will hear a case on whether to restrict access to mifepristone, a commonly used abortion pill.
  - AESC announced a $1.5 billion expansion of its lithium-ion EV battery manufacturing in Florence County, South Carolina, creating 1,080 new jobs, bringing the total investment to $3.12 billion and supporting 2,700 new jobs.
- March 27 – 2024 Rockford stabbings: Four people are killed and seven others are injured during a mass stabbing in Rockford, Illinois.
- March 28
  - In United States v. Bankman-Fried, the defendant is sentenced to 25 years in prison after being convicted of several counts of wire fraud and money laundering after he scammed $8 billion from investors via his company FTX.
  - A bill that would have legalized recreational cannabis sales in Virginia is vetoed by governor Glenn Youngkin.
- March 31 – Millions of AT&T customers are affected by a data breach that leaked onto the dark web.

=== April ===
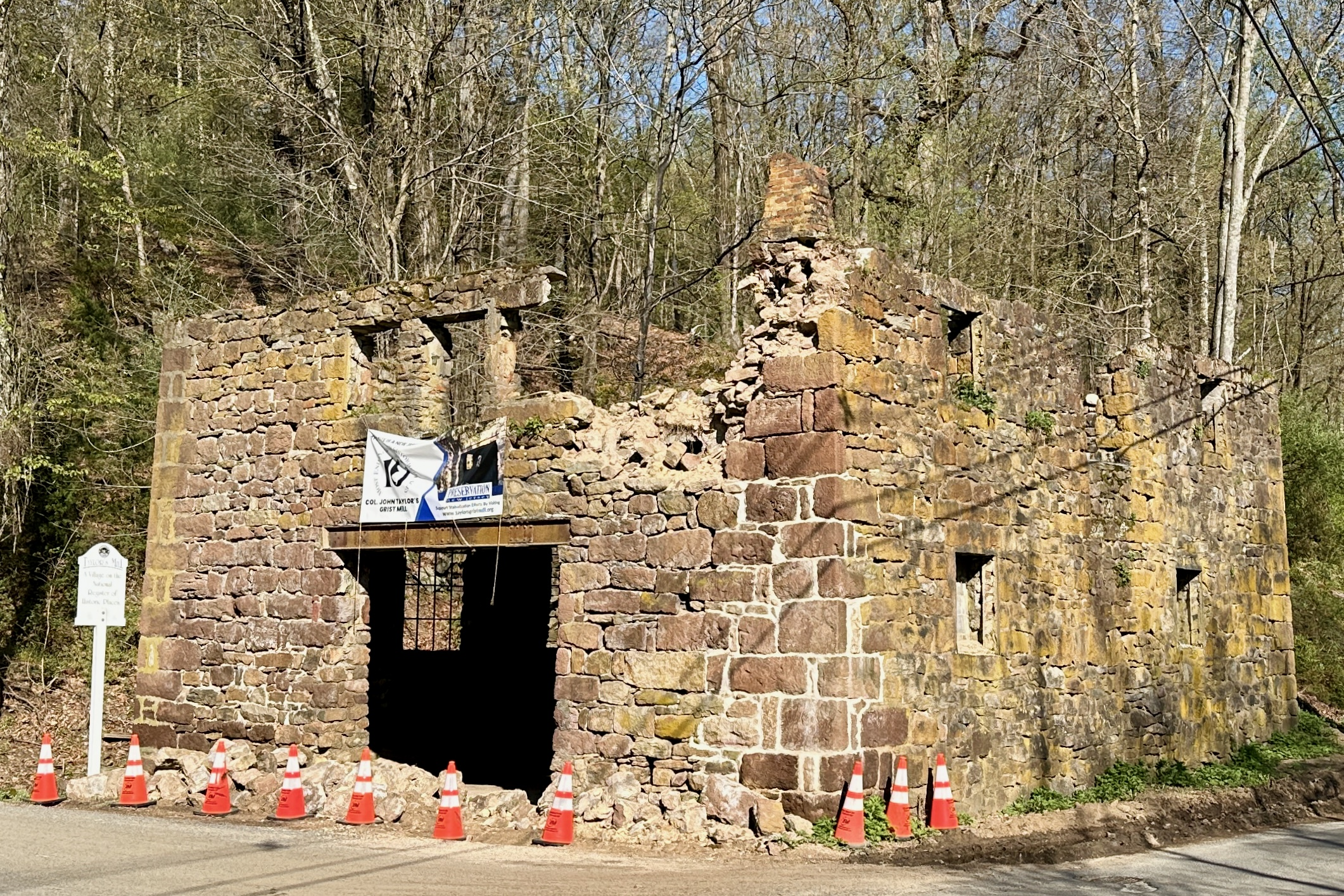
Damage that occurred to the historic gristmill, Taylor's Mill after a 4.8 magnitude earthquake struck New Jersey

- April 1
  - The Supreme Court of Florida rules that the Florida Constitution does not confer a right to abortion, allowing the 15-week abortion ban to remain in effect. The Court's decision also allowed a six-week abortion ban, which had been halted by the Court until a decision was made, to proceed. As a result, the ban would take effect 30 days after the ruling. In the same opinion, the Supreme Court also approved Florida Amendment 4 to proceed to the November 2024 ballot, which would enshrine a constitutional right to abortion before fetal viability.
  - Jacob Flickinger, a dual American-Canadian World Central Kitchen aid worker is killed by an Israeli drone strike alongside six other volunteers while delivering aid to the Gaza Strip amid its humanitarian crisis. The attack sparks outrage from the White House and prompts more criticism towards aid worker casualties stemming from Israel's operations.
- April 1–3 – A significant tornado outbreak and derecho affected much of the Midwestern and Southeastern United States. The outbreak of 86 tornadoes and the derecho caused $1.8 billion in damage. A total of 32 million people were estimated to be under watches or warnings issued by the National Weather Service, and over 700,000 people were estimated to have lost power.
- April 2 – General Electric splits into three independent companies: GE Aerospace, GE Vernova and GE HealthCare.
- April 3 – The United States Army Corps of Engineers begins dredging the San Juan Bay in Puerto Rico to open space for a new natural gas terminal that is expected to add $400 million to the local economy.
- April 4
  - Bird flu spreads to cattle herds in at least six U.S. states, while a dairy farm worker is infected in Texas, becoming the second person to ever become infected with the virus in the United States.
  - Researchers at the Dark Energy Spectroscopic Instrument in Arizona release the largest 3D map of the universe featuring more than six million galaxies.
- April 5
  - A magnitude 4.8 earthquake strikes New Jersey, causing tremors throughout the East Coast.
  - 99 Cents Only Stores begins closing all of its 371 stores in the United States.
- April 7 – In women's college basketball, South Carolina wins the national championship to complete their perfect 38–0 season, only the 10th perfect season in NCAA women's basketball history.
- April 8
  - A total solar eclipse is viewable in the central and northeastern US, with the path of total eclipse over parts of Texas, Oklahoma, Arkansas, Missouri, Illinois, Kentucky, Indiana, Ohio, Pennsylvania, New York, Vermont, New Hampshire, and Maine.
  - In men's college basketball, Connecticut repeats as national champions, becoming the first program to do so since the Florida Gators did so in 2006 and 2007.
- April 9
  - James and Jennifer Crumbley, parents of convicted Oxford High School shooter Ethan Crumbley, are each sentenced to 10–15 years in prison after being found guilty of involuntary manslaughter earlier this year, the first parents in the nation to be held accountable for their child's school shooting.
  - Abortion in Arizona: In Planned Parenthood Arizona v. Mayes, the Arizona Supreme Court upholds an 1864 law that disallows most types of abortions.
- April 10 – At least one person is killed by flooding in Mississippi as severe storms hit the South.
- April 11 – Sabrina Carpenter releases her single "Espresso"
- April 12 – A man crashes a semi-trailer truck into a Texas Department of Public Safety building, killing one person and injuring 13 others.
- April 17
  - Impeachment of Alejandro Mayorkas: The United States Senate votes to dismiss both impeachment articles against Homeland Security Secretary Alejandro Mayorkas, by a vote of 51–48 on the first article and 51–49 on the second article.
  - The Biden administration announces that it will reimpose oil sanctions on Venezuela.
  - Students at Columbia University begin a pro-Palestinian occupation protest on campus. Hundreds are arrested after New York City leadership orders the protests to disperse, and the protesters are accused of Antisemitism.
- April 18 – In ice hockey, the National Hockey League board approves the relocation of the Arizona Coyotes to Salt Lake City, Utah. The team will play home games at the Delta Center, home of the National Basketball Association's Utah Jazz, until a new arena is complete.
- April 19
  - Maxwell Azzarello, a 37-year-old man from St. Augustine, Florida, self-immolates in front of the New York Supreme Court in New York City where the New York state criminal trial against Trump is set to begin. He died early the next day.
  - Taylor Swift releases her new double album The Tortured Poets Department. It breaks the record for most-streamed album in a single day and she becomes the most-streamed artist in a single day.
  - Tesla recalls thousands of Cybertrucks due to "safety concerns" involving the truck's accelerator pedals.
  - The U.S. Department of Education releases revisions to Title IX expanding protections to LGBTQ+ students.
- April 20 – The House passes a series of bills that would provide $95 billion in military aid to countries including Ukraine, Israel, and Taiwan.
- April 23
  - After five months with communication problems, NASA receives decipherable data from Voyager 1.
  - The Federal Trade Commission issues a rule that bans non-compete clauses across nearly all industries and professions, prompting a lawsuit over the new rule from the US Chamber of Commerce and its allies the next day.
  - The Department of Justice agrees to pay $138.7 million to those who were sexually assaulted by Larry Nassar for the mishandled investigation by the Federal Bureau of Investigation (FBI).
  - A Douglas DC-4 crashes into the Tanana River in Alaska, shortly after takeoff from Fairbanks, killing two people on board.
- April 24
  - Biden signs the Protecting Americans from Foreign Adversary Controlled Applications Act, requiring that ByteDance sell TikTok to an American company in nine months or face the app being banned in the US. In response, ByteDance sues the U.S. government on First Amendment grounds two weeks later. A similar lawsuit is filed by eight TikTok creators on May 14.
  - Toyota announced that it will invest $1.4 billion to assemble a new battery electric vehicle at its Princeton facility in Indiana.
- April 25–27 – The NFL Draft is held in Detroit with the Chicago Bears taking former USC quarterback Caleb Williams with the first overall pick. Over 700,000 people attend the three day event, breaking the record held by the 2019 draft in Nashville by 100,000.
- April 25
  - Film producer Harvey Weinstein's 2020 rape conviction is overturned by the New York Court of Appeals by a vote of 4–3, and a new trial is ordered. However, Weinstein will remain in prison on a 2022 conviction in California for rape.
  - The Federal Communications Commission votes to restore net neutrality rules implemented by the Obama administration after their repeal in 2017.
  - AWS announced its intention to build new data centers in Indiana as part of an $11 billion investment, the largest capital injection into the region ever.
  - The University of Southern California cancels its main commencement ceremony due to safety concerns stemming from Israel–Hamas war protests on their campus.
- April 25–28 – A very large, deadly and destructive tornado outbreak occurred across the Midwestern, Southern, and High Plains. Over four days, 164 tornadoes touched down, killed 6 people, injured over 178 others, and caused $1.2 billion in damage. On April 26, a destructive EF4 tornado that struck Elkhorn and Blair in Nebraska and an intense EF3 tornado that struck Minden, Harlan, and Defiance in Iowa, where winds of 224 miles per hour (360 km/h) were measured in the tornado. On April 27, a deadly and large EF4 tornado struck Marietta, Oklahoma, and two deadly EF3 tornadoes struck Sulphur, Oklahoma, and Holdenville, Oklahoma.
- April 26 – The Louisiana Supreme Court rules 4–3 in favor of predominantly White St. George, Louisiana leaving Baton Rouge, Louisiana.
- April 29
  - The United States and Mexico agree to clamp down on illegal immigration; Presidents Joe Biden and Andrés Manuel López Obrador agree to a plan to reduce illegal crossings.
  - 2024 Charlotte shootout: Four law enforcement officers and one gunman are killed and four others are wounded during a shootout in Charlotte, North Carolina.
  - A Powerball jackpot of $1.3 billion is won by a Laotian immigrant battling cancer.
  - Texas Governor Greg Abbott sends a letter to the Texas Education Agency instructing it to ignore U.S. President Joe Biden's revisions to Title IX adding protections for LGBTQ+ students.
- April 30 – Judge Juan Merchan fines Donald Trump $9,000 for contempt of court, and threatens him with jail if he continues to violate his gag order.

=== May ===
Minnesota adopts a new state flag

- May 1
  - Federal judge Catherine Eagles blocks several of North Carolina's restrictions on abortion pill mifepristone, striking down a requirement that the drug only be prescribed by doctors in-person, as well as a requirement for patients to have an in-person follow-up appointment.
  - The United Methodist Church votes 692–51 to repeal a longstanding ban on LGBTQ clergy. The vote also forbids superintendents from forbidding a same-sex wedding.
  - Pro-Israel counter-protestors attack the pro-Palestinian encampment at the University of California, Los Angeles, throwing objects and attempting to destroy barricades.
- May 2
  - Florida becomes the first state in the United States to ban cultured meat.
  - Arizona governor Katie Hobbs signs a bill that will allow abortions up to 15 weeks into the pregnancy, reversing the state Supreme Court's decision in Planned Parenthood Arizona v. Mayes from last month.
  - Clothing retailer Rue21 files for Chapter 11 bankruptcy after accumulating $194.4 million in debt and announces it will close all of its 540 stores after 54 years in business.
- May 3
  - Representative Henry Cuellar is indicted for accepting nearly $600,000 worth of bribes from an Azerbaijan-controlled company and a Mexican bank.
  - Rivian announced plans to invest $1.5 billion to expand its operations in Illinois.
  - More than 2,000 people have been arrested for involvement in the pro-Palestinian university campus protests.
  - The Federal Trade Commission approves ExxonMobil's acquisition of Pioneer Natural Resources for $60 billion after concessions.
- May 4 – The 150th edition of the Kentucky Derby is held, with American thoroughbred racehorse Mystik Dan winning in a photo finish.
- May 5
  - McLaren driver Lando Norris wins his first Formula One race after placing first in the Miami Grand Prix.
  - Kyle Larson defeats Chris Buescher to win the AdventHealth 400 at the Kansas Speedway in the closest finish in NASCAR Cup Series history, winning a photo finish by one-thousandth (0.001) of a second.
- May 6
  - Reactions to 2024 pro-Palestinian protests on university campuses: Columbia University cancels its main graduation ceremony due to ongoing the pro-Palestinian protests and occupation on its campus.
  - A radical group identifying as "Rachel Corrie's Ghost Brigade" claims responsibility for setting fire to 15 vehicles belonging to the Portland Police Bureau on May 1. The group stated this act was intended to preemptively prevent the police from dismantling a pro-Palestinian encampment at Portland State University.
  - Steward Health Care System, a for-profit hospital chain, files for Chapter 11 bankruptcy.
  - The 2024 Met Gala in New York City takes place with the theme "The Garden of Time," celebrating the Met's exhibit Sleeping Beauties: Reawakening Fashion.
  - The Department of Education’s Office for Civil Rights opens an investigation into a gender identity policy of the Katy Independent School District in Texas, which board members passed on August 28, 2023, and requires district employees to disclose to parents if a student requests the use of different pronouns or identifies as transgender.
- May 6–10 – A tornado outbreak drops 179 tornadoes over five days across the country, notably in Barnsdall and Bartlesville, Oklahoma and Tallahassee, Florida.
- May 7 – The Boy Scouts of America announces the renaming of the organization to Scouting America, effective on February 8, 2025.
- May 8
  - A statue of the late African American civil rights leader Daisy Bates is unveiled at the U.S. Capitol building in Washington, D.C., representing the state of Arkansas.
  - Researchers at Google DeepMind announce the development of AlphaFold 3, an AI model that can predict the structures of almost all biological molecules and model the interactions between them.
  - Healthcare chain Ascension announces it has been the target of a cyber attack on its computer systems.
  - Following a similar April 29 letter to the Texas Education Agency, Texas Governor Greg Abbott sends a letter to Texas public university systems and community colleges directing them not to comply with U.S. President Joe Biden's revisions to Title IX adding protections for LGBTQ+ students.
- May 9 – A record annual increase in atmospheric CO_{2} is reported from the Mauna Loa Observatory in Hawaii, with a jump of 4.7 parts per million (ppm) compared to a year earlier.
- May 10–13 – May 2024 solar storms: Solar cycle 25, a geomagnetic storm, hits Earth, reaching G4 intensity and causing widespread aurorae, with NOAA's Space Weather Prediction Center issuing its first G4-level storm watch since 2005.
- May 10
  - Shenandoah County Public Schools of Virginia votes to reverse its 2020 decision and restores Confederate military leaders' names to schools.
  - The United States opposes a United Nations General Assembly resolution granting Palestine new rights and privileges, and to reconsider Palestine's request to become a UN member.
  - A Pennsylvania jury orders ExxonMobil to pay $725.5 million to a former mechanic who claimed that the company's gasoline and solvents caused him to develop leukemia.
- May 11 – Minnesota adopts its new state flag to coincide with the 166th anniversary of its date of statehood.
- May 13
  - Aftermath of the Francis Scott Key Bridge collapse: Construction crews use explosives to demolish the remaining parts of the Francis Scott Key Bridge in Baltimore, Maryland. The next step will be to refloat the MV Dali for removal, which will allow maritime traffic to resume normal operations.
  - Three years after the previous GameStop stock squeeze, Redditors return to artificially inflate GameStop's share price by 75%, to an 18-month high.
  - The Airlines for America trade association, along with major US airlines American, Delta, United, JetBlue, Hawaiian, and Alaska, files a lawsuit against the United States Department of Transportation over a rule requiring upfront disclosure of airline fees.
  - OpenAI announces a new model of their generative pretrained transformer (GPT) named GPT-4o, capable of visual and video speech recognition and translation.
- May 14
  - United States Army Major Harrison Mann resigns from the Defense Intelligence Agency over the U.S.'s support for Israel in Gaza.
  - 18 Republican states file a lawsuit against the Equal Employment Opportunity Commission to block legal protections for transgender workers.
  - Biden passes tariff increases on Chinese imports, including electric vehicle batteries, computer chips, and medical products.
  - Eight people are killed and 40 others are injured when a bus carrying farmworkers collides with a truck and overturns in Marion County, Florida.
  - Tennessee governor Bill Lee signs into law a bill that would see the death penalty for defendants convicted of child rape.
  - Seafood restaurant chain Red Lobster announces it will close 99 locations across the country. The chain filed for Chapter 11 bankruptcy the next week.
- May 15
  - Walgreens says that it will sell a generic version of the anti-overdose medication naloxone for ten dollars cheaper than the brand-name version, Narcan, also available on its shelves.
  - A barge hits the Pelican Island Causeway in Galveston, Texas, causing damage to the bridge and an oil spill in the Gulf Intracoastal Waterway.
  - Federal prosecutors in Manhattan charge two brothers Anton and James Peraire-Bueno, the sons of Jaime Peraire, with conspiracy to commit wire fraud, and conspiracy to commit money laundering, after they were arrested for exploiting the Ethereum blockchain and stealing $25 million worth of cryptocurrency.
  - The United States imposes visa restrictions on over 250 members of the Nicaraguan government along with sanctions on three entities for "repressive action" and failure to control migrant smuggling through Nicaragua.
  - Houston Astros pitcher Ronel Blanco is ejected from the game against the Oakland Athletics and receives a 10-game suspension after foreign substances were found in his glove.
  - The Supreme Court lets Louisiana use a new congressional map with two majority-Black congressional districts in the 2024 House of Representatives elections.
- May 16
  - The Dow Jones Industrial Average surpasses 40,000 points for the first time.
  - The European Union opens a formal investigation into Meta for potential breaches in online content rules relating to child safety on Facebook and Instagram, violating the Digital Services Act.
  - Blinken announces a $2 billion additional military aid package for Ukraine, aimed at investing in Ukraine's industrial base.
  - A significant derecho struck the Gulf Coast of the United States from Southeast Texas to Florida, causing widespread damage, particularly in the city of Houston and surrounding metropolitan area.
- May 19–27 – A multi-day period of significant tornado outbreaks, along with significant derechos, occurred across the Midwestern United States and the Mississippi Valley. From May 19 to 27, two derechos occurred and 247 tornadoes touched down, which killed 31 people, injured at least 243 others, and caused $7.3 billion in damage. On May 21, a large and violent multi-vortex tornado struck Greenfield, Iowa at EF4 intensity. In Greenfield, a mobile radar measured winds of 309–318 miles per hour (497–512 km/h) inside the tornado, marking the third time winds of over 300 miles per hour (480 km/h) had ever been measured. On May 25, an intense EF3 tornado struck Rosston, Era, Valley View, and Pilot Point in Texas, killing seven people, making it the deadliest tornado of both the outbreak sequence and in the United States during 2024 and injuring up to 100 others. Due to a malfunction, the tornado sirens in Valley View would not sound before the tornado struck. On May 26, another intense EF3 tornado struck Eddyville, Crider, Charleston, and Barnsley in Kentucky, which prompted the issuance of four tornado emergencies.
- May 20
  - The container ship Dali is freed from bridge debris since its initial collision on March 26 and is escorted by tugboats back to the port of Baltimore.
  - Judges grant Julian Assange permission to appeal his extradition order from the United Kingdom to the United States.
- May 21 – The Department of Justice files a complaint to sue the state of Oklahoma after the state's lawmakers drafted House Bill 4156, which would criminalize anyone without legal immigration status.
- May 22
  - Biden announces a student loans debt cancellation of $7.7 billion for 160,000 people.
  - Texas Attorney General Ken Paxton files a lawsuit against the Equal Employment Opportunity Commission and members of the Biden administration to contest EEOC guidance stating that denying employees accommodations for their gender identity is workplace harassment.
- May 23
  - During a state visit to the U.S. by Kenyan president William Ruto, President Biden announces his intention to designate Kenya as a major non-NATO ally.
  - The Department of Justice, along with 29 states and the District of Columbia, filed a sweeping antitrust lawsuit against Ticketmaster and its parent company Live Nation Entertainment for running an illegal monopoly over live events. A separate consumer class action lawsuit by ticket buyers is filed against the same defendants the next day.
- May 24
  - Two Americans, including the daughter of Missouri senator Ben Baker, are killed by gangs while doing missionary work in Haiti during the ongoing crisis in the country.
  - Families affected by the Uvalde school shooting file a lawsuit against Daniel Defense and Activision Blizzard for creating the DDM4 V7 gun and promoting the weapon through the games in the Call of Duty franchise. They also file a lawsuit against Meta Platforms's social media site Instagram, a product used by the gunman.
- May 25 – Anora, directed by Sean Baker, wins the Palme d'Or at the Cannes Film Festival, the first American film to do so since The Tree of Life in 2011.
- May 26 – 2024 Indianapolis 500: In auto racing, Josef Newgarden wins the Indianapolis 500 for the second consecutive year, becoming the first driver to do so since Hélio Castroneves in 2002.
- May 28
  - Humanitarian aid during the Gaza war: The U.S. removes the Gaza floating pier from the Gaza Strip for repair after its flotilla was damaged in bad weather.
  - One person is killed and seven others are injured in a natural gas explosion at an apartment building in Youngstown, Ohio.
- May 29 – Air Products announced plans to invest $15 billion to build a network of commercial-scale multi-modal hydrogen refueling stations connecting Northern and Southern California.
- May 30
  - The Department of Labor files a lawsuit against Hyundai Motors over illegal use of child labor in the company's Alabama factory.
  - Trump is found guilty of 34 counts of falsifying business records in his New York hush money trial, making him the first president to be ever convicted of a felony.
  - OpenAI removes online influence operations based in Russia, China, Iran, and Israel, due to the usage of AI to generate propaganda and fake content.
  - 2020–2024 H5N1 outbreak: A third human case of H5N1 bird flu is found in a dairy worker in Michigan.
  - The US and UK navies strike 13 Houthi locations across Yemen, damaging underground facilities and vessels, killing at least two people and wounding ten.
  - A Minneapolis police officer and a civilian are killed, and another police officer and three other people are wounded in a mass shooting. The shooter was also killed.

=== June ===
- June 1–29 – The 2024 ICC Men's T20 World Cup is co-hosted by the West Indies and the United States.
- June 1 – Ticketmaster and parent company Live Nation submit a SEC filing acknowledging a data breach of customer information potentially affecting 560 million users. Banco Santander and cloud provider Snowflake Inc. are also believed to have been affected by the same data breach.
- June 3 – The value of GameStop shares increases by 21% after Keith Gill posts a $116 million investment on Reddit.
- June 4 – Biden enacts an executive order to temporarily suspend asylum claims processing at the Mexico–United States border when the seven-day average exceeds 2,500.
- June 5
  - Boeing's Starliner capsule launches its first astronaut-crewed flight into space to the International Space Station after several delays at the Cape Canaveral Space Force Station in Florida.
  - A Syrian man fires several shots at the U.S. Embassy in Beirut, Lebanon, and is fatally shot by security forces.
  - A panel of the United States Food and Drug Administration rejects MDMA-assisted psychotherapy as a treatment for PTSD.
- June 6
  - The Department of State sanctions several Georgian Dream politicians with travel bans for passing the "Law on Transparency of Foreign Influence", threatening further penalties if Georgia continues "anti-democratic activity".
  - SpaceX launches Starship's Integrated Flight Test 4, successfully guiding both the Super Heavy booster and Starship upper stage to soft water landings in the Gulf of Mexico and the Indian Ocean, respectively.
- June 7 – The Biden administration passes new federal rules that mandate new vehicles sold in the U.S. have to increase fuel economy in automobiles by 2% per year for 2027 to 2031 for passenger cars and 2029 to 2031 for SUVs and light trucks.
- June 10 – After 17 years of litigation, Chiquita Brands International is found liable by a federal jury of financing the far-right paramilitary death squad United Self-Defense Forces of Colombia in the Antioquia and Magdalena Departments of Colombia.
- June 11 – Hunter Biden is convicted of three felony counts of possession of a firearm while under the influence of narcotics.
- June 12
  - Coach USA, a holding company for many bus services including Megabus, files Chapter 11 bankruptcy and seeks to sell its assets to shed $197.8 million of debt.
  - The National Weather Service issues a rare flash flood emergency in southern Florida for life-threatening flooding conditions only expected once every 500 to 1,000 years.
  - Attorney General Merrick Garland is found in contempt by the House .
  - The Oklahoma Supreme Court dismisses a lawsuit by the last survivors of the 1921 Tulsa race massacre who were seeking reparations.
- June 13
  - Dozens of hikers are afflicted with an unknown illness during hiking trips near Grand Canyon National Park.
  - In FDA v. Alliance for Hippocratic Medicine, the Supreme Court rules against efforts to restrict access to the abortion pill mifepristone, due to a lack of standing by the plaintiffs.
- June 14 – A bankruptcy judge in Houston approves a supplication to liquidate the personal assets of Alex Jones, but rejects the same supplication to liquidate the business assets of InfoWars—a highly prolific fake news website owned and operated by the far-right conspiracy theorist.
- June 15 – Nine people are injured, including two young children, in a shooting at a splash pad in the Detroit suburb of Rochester Hills.
- June 16
  - 2024 California wildfires: Around 1,200 people are evacuated from the Hungry Valley area near Los Angeles, California, as the Post Fire spreads through the dry mountains near Interstate 5.
  - The Birmingham Stallions defeat the San Antonio Brahmas to win the inaugural UFL championship. Stallions quarterback Adrian Martinez is named Most Valuable Player.
- June 17
  - In the 2024 NBA Finals, the Boston Celtics defeat the Dallas Mavericks in five games, winning their 18th overall NBA championship. The Celtics surpass the Los Angeles Lakers to become the team with the most NBA championships.
  - Federal judge Robert S. Lasnik orders BNSF Railway to pay the Swinomish Tribe in Washington state $400 million after the company intentionally trespassed and repeatedly ran 100-car trains carrying crude oil across the tribe's reservation.
  - 77th Tony Awards: At the 2024 Tony Awards, Stereophonic wins Best Play and The Outsiders wins Best Musical.
  - Maryland governor Wes Moore pardons over 175,000 people with low-level marijuana convictions.
  - The FTC sues Adobe Inc., accusing it of illegally hiding termination fees for its Creative Cloud software subscriptions which includes Adobe Photoshop as well as in subscriptions for Adobe Acrobat.
- June 18
  - EV startup Fisker files for Chapter 11 bankruptcy and begins selling its assets.
  - Nvidia surpasses Microsoft as the world's most valuable publicly traded company after its market cap exceeds $3.34 trillion.
  - The Department of Agriculture announces a temporary suspension on imports of mangoes and avocados from Michoacán, Mexico, after an incident that reportedly caused security concerns for safety inspectors.
  - Regan Smith breaks the 100 metres backstroke world record at the U.S. Olympic Swimming Trials in Indianapolis, Indiana.
  - 2024 New Mexico wildfires: At least one person dies, over 500 structures are damaged or destroyed, and several thousand people are forced to evacuate from Ruidoso, New Mexico, after the South Fork Fire burns over 15,000 acres of land.
- June 17–21 – The Northeast and Midwest experience heatwaves in which heat indexes reach 105 °F (41 °C).
- June 19
  - Louisiana Governor Jeff Landry signs a bill that makes it the first state to mandate that the Ten Commandments be displayed in every public school classroom.
  - 2024 Atlantic hurricane season: Tropical Storm Alberto forms in the Gulf of Mexico, the first storm of the 2024 Atlantic hurricane season.
- June 20–July 14 – The 2024 Copa América is hosted by the United States.
- June 20 – Researchers announce the discovery of Lokiceratops rangiformis, a dinosaur species named after the Norse god Loki, in the Judith River Formation in Montana. The findings are published in the journal PeerJ.
- June 21
  - Four people are killed and nine are injured in a mass shooting at a grocery store in Fordyce, Arkansas.
  - 2024 North America heat waves: At least six people die due to heat-related illness in the Phoenix metropolitan area in Arizona, as temperatures reach 115 °F (46 °C).
- June 22 – A University of Illinois team led by Joshua Wurman and Karen Kosiba confirms mobile radar measurements of between 309 mph (497 km/h) and 318 mph (512 km/h) in the tornado that struck Greenfield, Iowa on May 21. This is the first unambiguous radar confirmation of tornado winds over 300 mph (480 km/h).
- June 24
  - WikiLeaks founder Julian Assange enters a plea deal with the U.S. Justice Department, in which he will be found guilty on one federal charge in exchange for his release back to Australia. He is freed the next day.
  - The Florida Panthers win the 2024 Stanley Cup Final, beating the Edmonton Oilers in seven games, making it their first championship in franchise history. The win comes after losing the previous year's Stanley Cup Final against the Vegas Golden Knights. The Panthers also avoid becoming the fifth team in National Hockey League history to lose a series despite having a 3-0 series lead, and the second to do so in the Stanley Cup Final since the 1941–42 Detroit Red Wings.
  - Novo Nordisk announced plans to build a $4.1 billion facility in North Carolina, as demand for its weight-loss drugs has increased.
- June 26
  - The 2024 NBA draft is held at the Barclays Center in Brooklyn, with the Atlanta Hawks selecting Zaccharie Risacher with the first overall pick.
  - Biden pardons thousands of former servicemembers who were formerly convicted of a now-repealed military ban on consensual homosexual sex.
- June 27
  - The National Transportation Safety Board announces sanctions against Boeing after the NTSB investigation into the Alaska Airlines Flight 1282 door plug accident, where Boeing allegedly released information that the NTSB did not verify.
  - The Department of Justice charges 193 people, including 76 medical professionals, with participating in healthcare fraud schemes worth $2.75 billion, including unlawful distribution of Adderall and drug addiction treatments.
  - A federal jury rules that the NFL violated antitrust laws by distributing out-of-market games through the premium Sunday Ticket package, awarding damages that accumulate to $4.7 billion between residential and commercial subscribers.
  - The first 2024 presidential debate between President Joe Biden and former President Donald Trump is broadcast by CNN in Atlanta.
  - The Supreme Court issues a ruling in Moyle v. United States, dismissing the case and reinstating the ability to perform exceptional emergency abortion care in Idaho, where a formal ban on abortion is in place.
- June 28
  - The Supreme Court issues a 6–3 decision in Loper Bright Enterprises v. Raimondo which overrules precedent set in the 1984 case Chevron U.S.A., Inc. v. Natural Resources Defense Council, Inc. reducing the power of federal agencies.
  - Following his debate performance, concerns about Biden's age and health are raised. In addition to the debate, Biden's campaign team is accused of withholding information about his condition from Democratic leaders. In the aftermath of the debate, multiple Democrats, including current and former members of Congress, statewide officials, journalists, donors, and celebrities called for Biden to suspend his campaign for president, citing concerns about his cognitive ability. Biden suspended his campaign three weeks later.
- June 29 – The Biden administration expands its Temporary Protected Status program to 309,000 Haitians in the country to February 2026, offering them deportation relief and work permits.
- June 30 – Inside Out 2 surpasses $1 billion in worldwide box office earnings in less than three weeks, the fastest of any animated film in history.

=== July ===
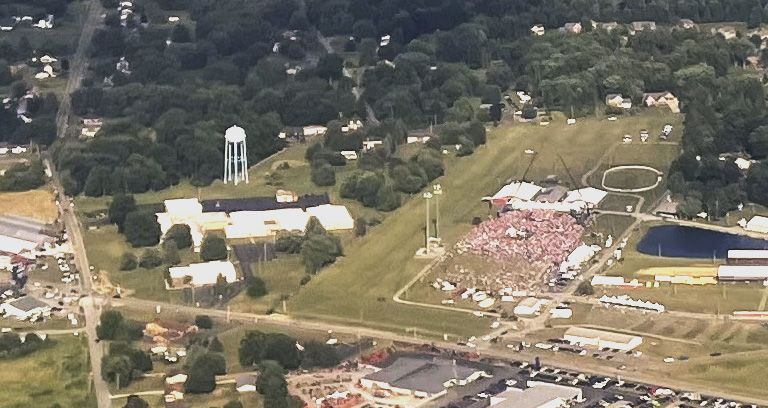
Donald Trump survives an assassination attempt by Thomas Crooks whilst speaking at a rally near Butler, Pennsylvania on July 13

- July 1 – In Trump v. United States, the Supreme Court rules in a 6–3 decision that former presidents are entitled to absolute immunity from prosecution for official acts that rely on core constitutional powers, taken while in office, presumed immunity for other official acts, and no immunity for unofficial acts.
- July 2
  - The Department of Homeland Security deports 116 migrants back to China to deter illegal immigration across the Mexican border, representing the nation's first "large charter flight" deportation in the past five years.
  - Rudy Giuliani is disbarred in the state of New York for his efforts in attempting to overturn the 2020 United States presidential election.
  - Panama and the US sign a deal to reduce the flow of illegal immigration to the southern United States border through the Darién Gap, with the US covering the costs of repatriating migrants who enter Panama illegally.
  - A dozen resigned United States government officials release a joint statement denouncing Biden and his administration for their "undeniable complicity" in war crimes against Palestinian civilians by violating federal law to continue sending Israel weapons.
- July 3
  - At least 26,000 people are forced to evacuate amidst dozens of large wildfires in Northern California.
  - The EPA fines General Motors $145.8 million for excess emissions found in 5.9 million GM vehicles.
- July 4
  - Hudson's Bay Company, the parent company of Saks Fifth Avenue, completes a merger and purchases luxury department stores Neiman Marcus and Bergdorf Goodman for $2.65 billion.
- July 6 – 2024 North America heat waves: Maricopa County investigates over 160 suspected heat-related deaths related to ongoing heat waves across Arizona, California, and Oregon.
- July 7
  - Skydance Media and Paramount Global announced a definitive agreement to merge in a deal valued at $8 billion.
  - Four volunteer NASA crew members finish the first 378-day Crew Health and Performance Exploration Analog mission to simulate living on Mars at the Johnson Space Center in Houston.
- July 7–11 – Hurricane Beryl makes landfall in Texas, causing at least $6 billion (2024 USD) in damage to the state, before continuing across the central United States, where it produced a large and significant tornado outbreak consisting of 68 tornadoes. At least 48 deaths occurred in the United States as a result of Beryl.
- July 8 – Boeing agrees to plead guilty to a criminal fraud conspiracy charge to avoid going on trial on charges related to two fatal crashes involving its 737 MAX aircraft in 2018 and 2019.
- July 9
  - The 75th NATO summit is held in Washington, D.C.
  - The Key Largo tree cactus (Pilosocereus millspaughii) is declared locally extinct in Florida as the first US extinction event due to sea level rise.
  - Director of National Intelligence Avril Haines accuses the Iranian government of using social media to covertly encourage and finance pro-Palestinian campus protests, to deepen American political divisions and increase distrust in democratic institutions.
  - Hacktivist collective SiegedSec leaks two gigabytes of data about the Heritage Foundation.
- July 10 – United States support for Israel in the Gaza war – The Biden administration resumes sending 500-pound bombs to Israel after shipments were suspended in May.
- July 12 – Alec Baldwin's manslaughter charges arising from the Rust shooting incident are dismissed due to a Brady violation.
- July 13 – Trump is shot in an assassination attempt at a campaign rally in Butler, Pennsylvania, receiving minor injuries. The Butler County District Attorney reports that the suspect was shot dead and that a member of the audience was killed in the shooting. Two other attendees were injured.
- July 13–16 – An intense sequence of severe weather outbreaks affected much of the Midwestern and Northeastern United States, producing two significant derechoes that each had wind gusts exceeding 100 mph (160 km/h), as well as multiple tornado outbreaks that produced a combined 90 tornadoes.
- July 15
  - Federal judge Aileen Cannon dismisses Trump's classified documents case.
  - The 2024 Republican National Convention was held at the Fiserv Forum in Milwaukee until July 18. Trump chose Senator JD Vance from Ohio as his running-mate on the first day.
- July 16 – Democratic Senator Bob Menendez from New Jersey is convicted on all counts, including bribery, by a jury in a federal corruption trial.
- July 17
  - VF Corporation sells Supreme to the French-Italian eyewear conglomerate EssilorLuxottica for US$1.5 billion.
  - President Biden tests positive for COVID-19 and goes into self-isolation.
- July 18 – Darden Restaurants announces it will acquire Chuy's for $605 million.
- July 19 – CrowdStrike launches a faulty software update which causes IT systems worldwide to go down, with the worst impacts affecting airlines.
- July 21
  - President Biden announces he will withdraw from the 2024 presidential election.
  - Vice President Kamala Harris launches her campaign for president, receiving Biden's support and becoming the presumptive nominee for the Democratic Party the next day.
- July 23
  - Secret Service director Kimberly Cheatle resigns following widespread criticism of her department's actions during the attempted assassination of Donald Trump.
  - Israeli Prime Minister Benjamin Netanyahu visits the United States and gives a speech before the U.S. Congress. Boycotts and protests against his visit occur due to the ongoing Gaza war.
- July 25 – Ismael "El Mayo" Zambada, leader of Mexico's Sinaloa cartel, is arrested by US federal agents in El Paso, Texas.
- July 26 – The 2024 SAG-AFTRA video game strike starts.
- July 30 – In Florida v. Benefield, popularly known as the Black Swan case, the jury found Ashley Benefield guilty of the manslaughter of her husband, Douglas "Doug" Benefield.

=== August ===
- August 1
  - 2024 American–Russian prisoner exchange: 26 individuals are released from Ankara Esenboğa Airport in the largest prisoner exchange between the United States and Russia since the Cold War.
  - The Utah Supreme Court rules that the state's abortion ban, which has been blocked since June 2022, should continue to be blocked.
  - The Biden administration announces its recognition of opposition candidate Edmundo González Urrutia of the Democratic Unitary Platform as the legitimate winner of the 2024 Venezuelan presidential election instead of President Nicolás Maduro of the United Socialist Party of Venezuela.
- August 2 – In United States v. Khalid Sheikh Mohamm, Secretary of Defense Lloyd Austin revokes a plea deal with three men who are accused of plotting the September 11 attacks, effectively reinstating it as a death penalty case.
- August 3–10 – Hurricane Debby makes landfall in Florida before moving across and affecting the East Coast of the United States. In total, Debby killed 10 people and caused $7 billion in damage.
- August 6
  - The FBI announces that they have launched an investigation into Tennessee representative Andy Ogles as a result of allegedly fraudulent campaign spending. A search warrant was issued on August 2, and his cell phone had been seized.
  - A wrongful death lawsuit is filed in King County, Washington for $50 million by the family of French deep sea explorer Paul-Henri Nargeolet, who perished in the Titan submersible implosion while diving to the wreck of the Titanic during the previous calendar year.
  - Recreational cannabis sales begin in Ohio.
- August 8 – Utah executes convicted murderer and rapist Taberon Honie, the state's first execution since 2010.
- August 15 – Five people are charged in relation to the death of Friends star Matthew Perry.
- August 19 – Former representative George Santos pleads guilty to identity theft and wire fraud.
- August 19–22 – The 2024 Democratic National Convention takes place at the United Center in Chicago, where Kamala Harris and Tim Walz are officially nominated as the party's choice for president and vice president, respectively, in the upcoming election in November.
- August 20
  - Federal judge Charles Ralph Simpson III dismisses two felony charges against the two police officers who were involved in the killing of Breonna Taylor, determining that her boyfriend was ultimately responsible for her death by firing at the two law enforcement officials and, thus, prompting them to retaliate.
  - Federal judge Leonie Brinkema rules that people who are positive for HIV cannot be barred from enlisting the United States Armed Forces.
- August 23 – Robert F. Kennedy Jr. suspends his campaign for the presidency and endorses Donald Trump.
- August 24 – The Massachusetts Department of Public Health places the towns of Douglas, Oxford, Plymouth, Sutton, and Webster on high alert after a patient is diagnosed with mosquito-vectored eastern equine encephalitis in the state's first case since the 2019–2020 outbreak.
- August 27
  - A jury in a Los Angeles federal court finds disbarred attorney Thomas Girardi guilty of four counts of wire fraud after he was accused of stealing $15 million in settlement funds from his clients.
  - Special Counsel Jack Smith issues revised charges against former President Donald Trump for his alleged attempts to interfere in the 2020 election.
- August 29 – The US Army issues a rebuke of Donald Trump's presidential campaign over an incident at Arlington National Cemetery, in which a federal employee was "abruptly pushed aside" and Trump posed for a photo opportunity at soldiers' gravestones.
- August 30
  - The Michigan Supreme Court rules that businesses cannot get state compensation over pandemic closures.
  - The Maryland Supreme Court rules that, after being vacated in 2022, Adnan Masud Syed's convictions and sentences should be reinstated due to procedural errors.
- August 31 – The body of American-Israeli citizen Hersh Goldberg-Polin is recovered from the Rafah tunnels. Goldberg-Polin had been kidnapped from the Re'im music festival on October 7, 2023, and was held by Hamas for almost a year until his execution one to two days before his body was found.

=== September ===
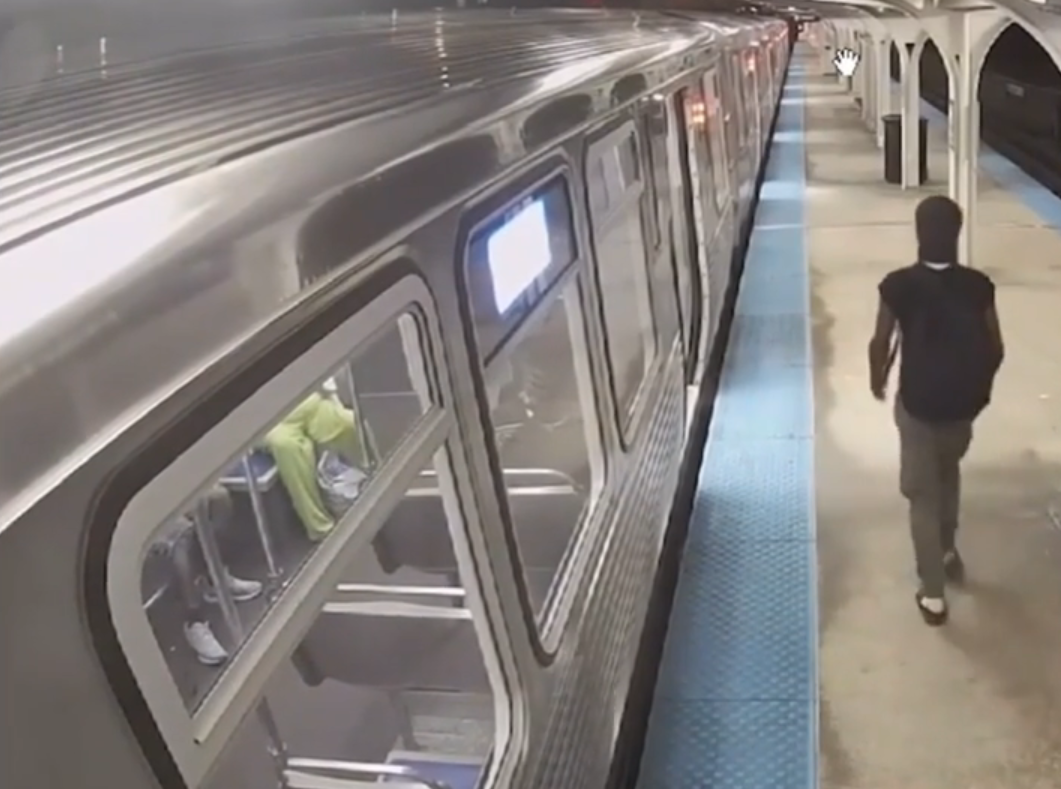
On September 2, a mass shooting where four people were killed occurred on a Blue Line train in Chicago, Illinois

- September 2
  - 2024 Chicago train shooting: Four homeless people are randomly killed during a mass shooting on a CTA train in suburban Chicago.
  - The US seizes a plane used by Venezuelan President Nicolás Maduro, and flies it from the Dominican Republic to Florida.
- September 4
  - Apalachee High School shooting: Four people are killed and nine are injured during a mass shooting at Apalachee High School near Winder, Georgia.
  - A federal indictment alleges that Tennessee-based company Tenet Media, whose employees have included right-wing influencers Tim Pool and Dave Rubin, has functioned as a Russian government-backed disinformation campaign.
- September 5
  - Hunter Biden enters an Alford plea to nine federal counts, including tax evasion and filing false tax returns.
  - The US signs a treaty with the European Union, the United Kingdom, and seven other countries, which is the first in history on the use of artificial intelligence systems.
- September 6 – Ayşenur Ezgi Eygi, a Turkish-American International Solidarity Movement activist, is killed while participating in a protest against the IDF near Nablus.
- September 7 – Interstate 75 Kentucky shooting: Five people are injured when a man opens fire at passing cars on Interstate 75 near London, Kentucky.
- September 9–12 – Hurricane Francine makes landfall in Louisiana and causes flooding across the Gulf Coast of the United States, causing $1.5 billion in damage.
- September 10
  - Trump and Harris debate for the first time, hosted by ABC News at the National Constitution Center in Philadelphia.
  - A jury finds Shawn Laval Smith guilty for the murder of Brianna Kupfer, in Los Angeles, California.
- September 12 – The first commercial spacewalk is conducted by entrepreneur Jared Isaacman as part of the Polaris Dawn mission, which also includes the highest altitude orbit by a human crew since the Apollo program.
- September 14 – Arizona governor Katie Hobbs signs a bill that repeals the state's 1864 ban on abortion.
- September 15 – Attempted assassination of Donald Trump in Florida: An assassination attempt against Trump takes place at his West Palm Beach Golf Club. No one is injured, and the suspect, Ryan Wesley Routh, is caught before firing a shot.
- September 16 – Sean "P. Diddy" Combs is arrested in Manhattan and charged with racketeering, sex trafficking, and transportation to engage in prostitution.
- September 17
  - A three-judge panel on the United States Court of Appeals for the Second Circuit upholds the conviction of Ghislaine Maxwell for sex trafficking of underage girls in relation to Jeffrey Epstein.
  - California governor Gavin Newsom signs a bill which prohibits the replacement of actors with artificial intelligence under state law.
- September 18
  - Food storage container firm Tupperware files for bankruptcy, amid declining sales.
  - Kentucky governor Andy Beshear issues an executive order to ban the practice of conversion therapy in the state.
- September 19 – 2024 Major League Baseball season: Shohei Ohtani of the Los Angeles Dodgers becomes the first MLB player in history to join the 50–50 club, stealing over 50 bases and hitting over 50 home runs in a single season.
- September 20 – South Carolina carries out its first execution since 2011 with convicted murderer Freddie Eugene Owens.
- September 21 – September 2024 Birmingham shooting: Four people are killed and 17 are injured in a mass shooting in Birmingham, Alabama.
- September 22 – 2024 Major League Baseball season: The Chicago White Sox become the first American League team to reach 120 losses in a season and second in MLB history after the National League's 1962 New York Mets.
- September 24
  - Former Alameda Research CEO Caroline Ellison is sentenced to 24 months in jail for fraud charges.
  - Marcellus Williams is executed in Missouri for the 1998 murder of Felicia Gayle, despite calls from the victim's family and the prosecutor to spare his life.
  - While testifying to Congress about his potential role during the Mississippi welfare funds scandal, former Green Bay Packers quarterback Brett Favre announces that he has been diagnosed with Parkinson's disease.
- September 25 – New York City mayor Eric Adams is indicted following federal corruption investigations.
- September 26 – The Nevada Supreme Court orders the dismissal of the sex crime trial against Nathan Chasing Horse.
- September 27–30 – Hurricane Helene kills at least 215 and leaves 685 people missing in the southeast.
- September 27 – September sees the greatest number of inmates executed at five, within a one-week span since July 2003 with the execution of Alan Eugene Miller.

=== October ===
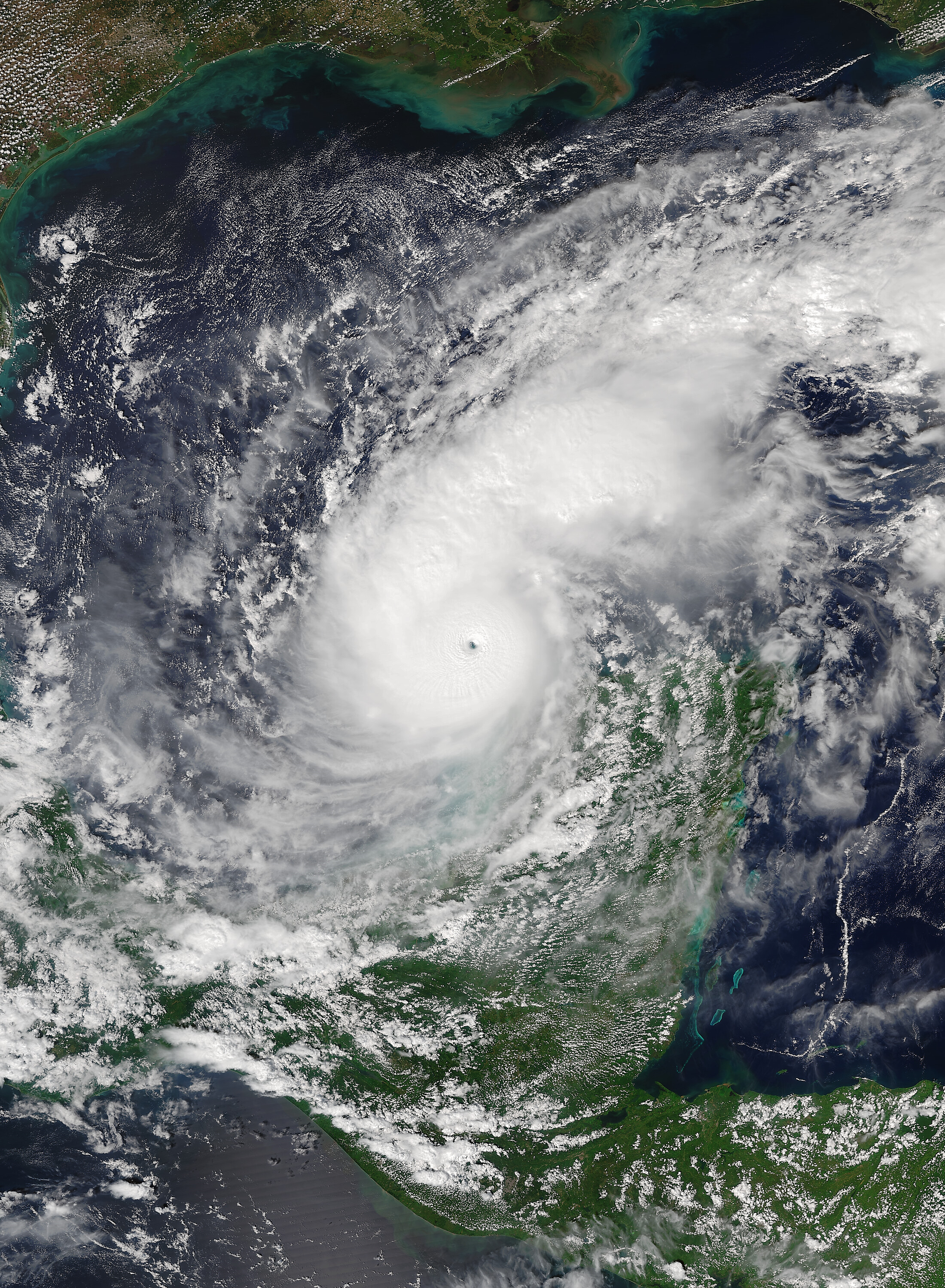
Hurricane Milton makes landfall in Florida in early October

- October 1
  - Jimmy Carter turns 100 years old, making him the first U.S. president to become a centenarian.
  - The vice presidential candidates, Minnesota Governor Tim Walz and Ohio Senator JD Vance, debate in New York City, hosted by CBS News.
  - 2024 United States port strike: Dockworkers at 36 ports begin three days of strike action, due to disagreements over compensation and the use of automation.
  - California officially bans fracking.
- October 2 – A new court filing by Special Counsel Jack Smith alleges that Donald Trump engaged in a "private criminal effort" to overturn the 2020 election results, and therefore should not be protected by the Supreme Court's ruling of immunity from prosecution for "official" acts conducted while in office.
- October 3 – Tina Peters, a former County Clerk of Mesa County, Colorado, becomes the first election official in the U.S. convicted of criminal charges related to 'stolen election' conspiracy theories surrounding the 2020 United States presidential election. She is sentenced to nine years in prison.
- October 8
  - The Environmental Protection Agency sets a 10-year deadline to replace all lead water pipes in the United States.
  - The Federal Bureau of Investigation announces the arrest of an Afghan national in Oklahoma City, Oklahoma, for allegedly plotting an ISIS-related attack on Election Day in November.
- October 8–11 – Hurricane Milton makes landfall in Florida, where 32 people were killed and 3.4 million people were left without power. Between October 8–9, 44 tornadoes touched down across Florida, including three EF3 tornadoes.
- October 10 – The Financial Crimes Enforcement Network levies a $3 billion fine against TD Bank for chronic violations of anti–money laundering laws.
- October 13 – SpaceX achieves the first successful return and capture of a Super Heavy booster from Starship, the biggest and most powerful rocket ever to fly.
- October 20 – Five new civil lawsuits are filed against Sean "Diddy" Combs in a federal court in New York, accusing the rapper of sexual assault and rape.
- October 21 – The Central Park Five file a lawsuit against Donald Trump in the United States District Court for the Eastern District of Pennsylvania over claims that he made in the second presidential debate on September 10.
- October 22
  - 2024 McDonald's E. coli outbreak: The CDC reports 75 people have fallen ill and one person has died after consuming McDonald's quarter pounders tainted with E. Coli. 15 more people will have fallen ill by October 31.
  - Deaths: Julia Hawkins, centenarian athlete (born 1916)
- October 23 – The Transportation Department fines American Airlines $50 million for violations of disability laws.
- October 24 – A mass stabbing attack in College Hill, Cincinnati results in 4 deaths, including the attacker.
- October 27 – Presidential candidate Donald Trump hosts a campaign rally at Madison Square Garden in New York City. The event is widely criticized for its use of racist and misogynistic language.
- October 28 – Actor Jay Johnston is sentenced to one year and one day in prison for his actions during the January 6 United States Capitol attack.
- October 30 – 2024 Major League Baseball season: The Los Angeles Dodgers win their eighth World Series title, defeating the New York Yankees four games to one.

=== November ===
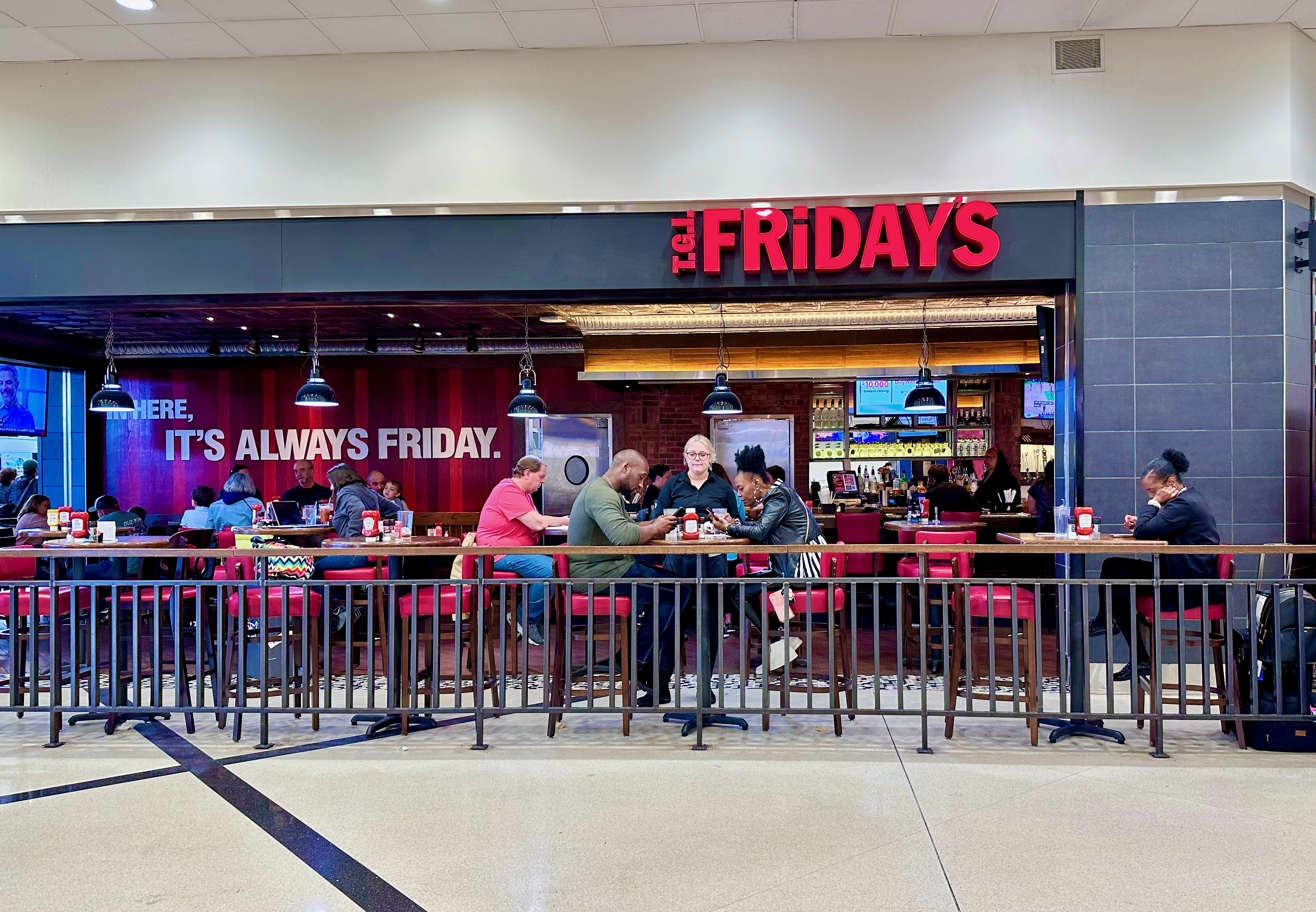
American restaurant chain TGI Fridays files for chapter 11 bankruptcy

Donald Trump is re-elected U.S. President, becoming one of two presidents to have been elected to non-consecutive terms, and also the first president to have been elected as a convicted felon

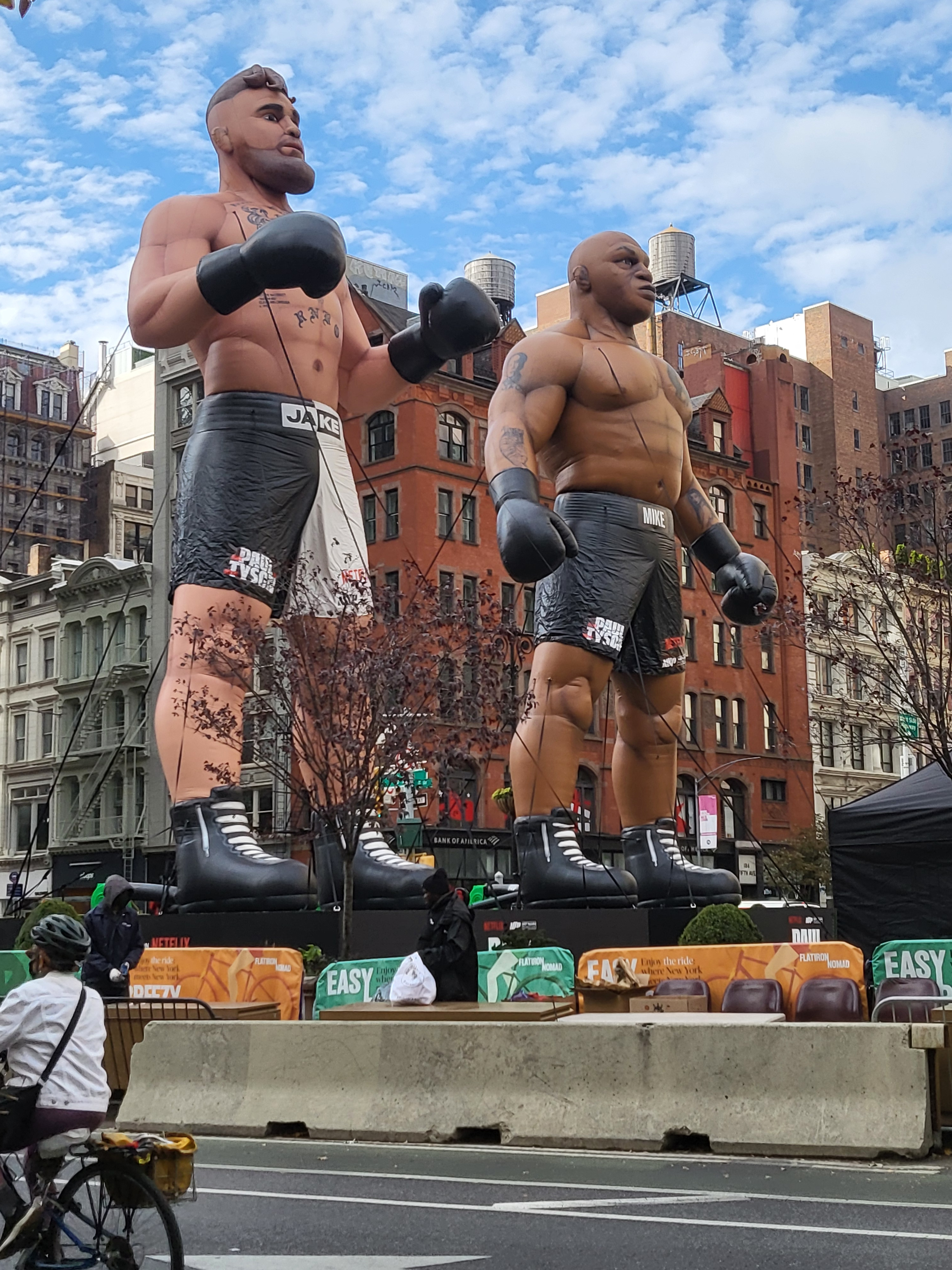
Dolls of Jake Paul and Mike Tyson on Broadway, New York City, being used as a promotion for the Jake Paul vs. Mike Tyson boxing match

- November 1 – South Carolina executes convicted murderer Richard Bernard Moore, despite pleas from the judge, jury, pastors, prison staff, and his relatives to spare his life.
- November 2
  - Casual dining restaurant chain TGI Fridays files for Chapter 11 bankruptcy.
  - Kamala Harris makes a surprise appearance on Saturday Night Live, prompting FCC regulator Brendan Carr to post on X (formerly Twitter) that the appearance violates equal-time rules.
- November 3 – Taylor Swift concludes The Eras Tour in the United States at Lucas Oil Stadium in Indianapolis, the highest-grossing concert tour of all time.
- November 4 – The night before election day, Presidential candidates Trump and Harris both hold events in Pittsburgh.
- November 5
  - Donald Trump and running mate JD Vance of the Republican Party defeat Kamala Harris and running mate Tim Walz of the Democratic Party in the 2024 United States presidential election. Trump becomes the second president elected to non-consecutive terms after Grover Cleveland, and the first convicted felon, as well as the oldest man elected president.
  - The United States and Somalia reach an agreement, involving the US writing off over $1 billion of Somalia's debt.
- November 6 – Biden announces the expedited granting of over US$6 billion in military aid to Ukraine.
- November 8 – The Department of Justice charges Iranian national Farhad Shakeri with an Iranian plot to attempt to assassinate Donald Trump.
- November 10
  - One person is killed and 16 others are injured in a school shooting during a homecoming weekend party at Tuskegee University.
  - In motorsports, Joey Logano of Team Penske wins the 2024 NASCAR Cup Series, his third win.
  - Donald Trump Jr. announces his plans to join conservative investment firm 1789 Capital.
- November 11 – Maryland Governor Wes Moore posthumously commemorates abolitionist Harriet Tubman as a one-star general in the Maryland National Guard, celebrating her for Veterans Day.
- November 12
  - Second cabinet of Donald Trump: Trump selects South Dakota Governor Kristi Noem as his Secretary of Homeland Security, Senator Marco Rubio as his Secretary of State, and Fox News host and Army veteran Pete Hegseth as his Secretary of Defense.
  - Haitian crisis: The Federal Aviation Administration issues a temporary 30-day ground on all U.S. airlines from flying to Haiti after gangs shot at a Spirit Airlines aircraft that was attempting to land at Toussaint Louverture International Airport in Port-au-Prince. The airport is also closed indefinitely in response to the shooting.
  - Trump announces he plans to create the Department of Government Efficiency and selects businessmen Elon Musk and Vivek Ramaswamy to lead it.
  - Heritage Project president Kevin Roberts' book Dawn's Early Light: Taking Back Washington to Save America is published.
- November 13 – Trump picks Matt Gaetz as his Attorney General; however, Gaetz withdraws on November 21 due to ongoing Congressional investigations against him.
- November 14
  - Satirical news site The Onion purchases Alex Jones' InfoWars at a bankruptcy auction.
  - Trump nominates environmental attorney Robert F. Kennedy Jr. as his Secretary of Health and Human Services, North Dakota Governor Doug Burgum as his Secretary of the Interior, and former Congressman Doug Collins as his Secretary of Veterans Affairs.
  - The Kingda Ka roller coaster at Six Flags Great Adventure, the world's tallest roller coaster, is retired.
- November 15
  - General Motors lays off 1,000 employees and closes several facilities.
  - Three daughters of civil rights activist Malcolm X file a $100 million wrongful death lawsuit against the CIA, the FBI, and the New York Police Department for their alleged roles in the assassination of Malcolm X.
  - Trump names Karoline Leavitt as the White House Press Secretary for his second term in office, which makes her the youngest person ever to serve in the role at 27 years old.
  - The Tyson v. Paul fight is live streamed on Netflix and takes place at AT&T Stadium in Arlington, Texas between Jake Paul and Mike Tyson. Paul was declared the winner by unanimous decision, and Netflix claims that 108 million people viewed the event on its platform.
- November 16
  - Trump picks Liberty Energy CEO Chris Wright as his Secretary of Energy.
  - The first case of Clade Ib mpox, a more spreadable variant linked to the outbreak in Africa, is detected in California.
- November 17 – Biden lifts restrictions on the Ukrainian use of US weapons for deep attacks inside of Russia, with Ukraine planning out long-distance attacks in the coming days. The first of these instances is two days later on November 19, where Ukraine launches ATACMS long-ranged missiles into Russia.
- November 18
  - Spirit Airlines files for Chapter 11 bankruptcy protection.
  - Trump picks Fox News host and former congressman Sean Duffy as his Secretary of Transportation.
- November 20
  - Jose Ibarra is found guilty of murdering Augusta University nursing student Laken Riley. He is sentenced to life in prison without the possibility of parole.
  - Trump picks former World Wrestling Entertainment CEO Linda McMahon as his Secretary of Education.
  - Gautam Adani, an Indian billionaire and the chairman of the Adani Group, was indicted by the District Court for the Eastern District of New York, along with seven other Adani executives, on charges of bribery.
- November 21
  - After Matt Gaetz withdraws his nomination for the position, Trump picks former Florida Attorney General Pam Bondi as his Attorney General.
  - Jussie Smollett hate crime hoax: The Supreme Court of Illinois vacates the conviction and sentence of Jussie Smollett for his staging of a hate crime against himself due to a violation of his due process rights.
- November 22
  - Trump picks hedge fund investor and former Yale professor Scott Bessent as his Secretary of the Treasury, congresswoman Lori Chavez-DeRemer as his Secretary of Labor, and former Texas state representative and retired NFL player Scott Turner as his Secretary of Housing and Urban Development.
  - Wicked, the first half of Universal Pictures' two-part film adaptation of the stage musical of the same name, is released in theaters and becomes an immediate pop culture phenomenon along with critical and commercial success, becoming the highest-grossing Broadway musical film adaptation of all time.
- November 23 – Trump picks America First Policy Institute CEO Brooke Rollins as his Secretary of Agriculture.
- November 25 – Jack Smith dismisses his 2020 election interference case against Trump.
- November 27 – The United States helps to mediate the ceasefire agreement between Israel and Lebanon since the conflict escalated in October.
- November 29 – Three people are wounded in a shooting on Black Friday at the Park Plaza Mall in Little Rock, Arkansas.

=== December ===
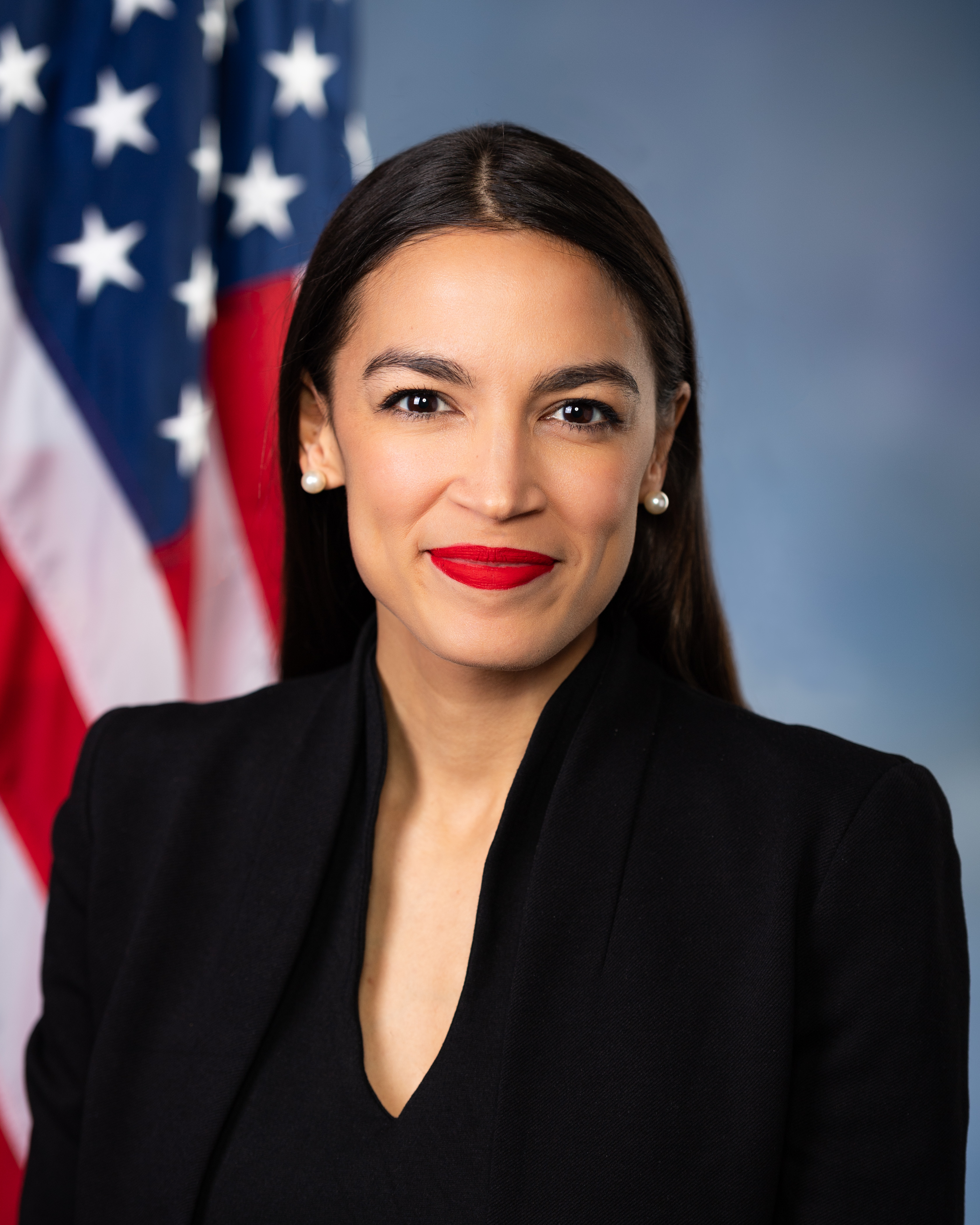
U.S. representative, Alexandria Ocasio-Cortez becomes the first ever person to reach 1 million followers on Bluesky, a competitor to X

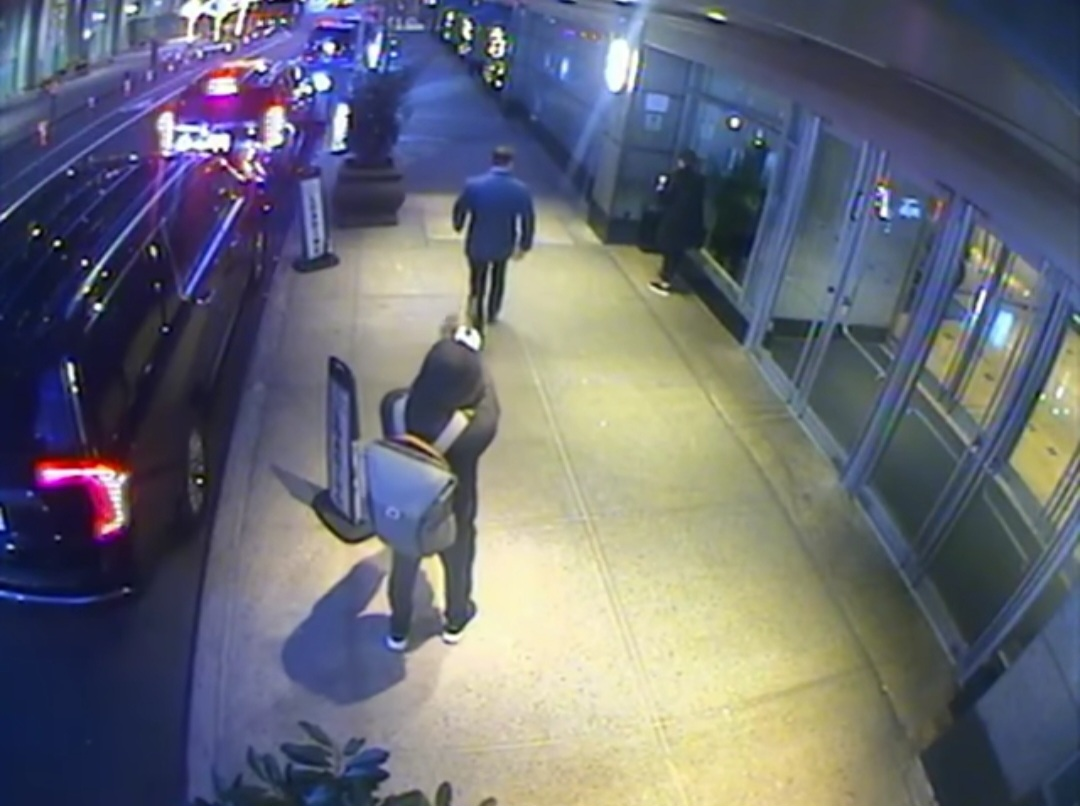
UnitedHealthcare CEO, Brian Thompson is assassinated by Luigi Mangione in New York City

The State Funeral of former U.S. President, Jimmy Carter was held in January 2025. He passed away on December 29, 2024, at the age of 100, making him the longest living U.S. President and the only U.S. President to have ever been a centenarian

- December 1 – President Biden issues a pardon for his son, Hunter Biden, despite previously pledging against doing so.
- December 2
  - Elon Musk loses his bid to reinstate a pay package to the tune of $56 billion.
  - Representative Alexandria Ocasio-Cortez becomes the first person to reach a million followers on Bluesky.
- December 4 – Brian Thompson, the CEO of insurance company UnitedHealthcare, is fatally shot outside the New York Hilton Midtown, in what police call a "targeted attack".
- December 5 – A magnitude 7.1 earthquake occurs off the coast of California, being felt hundreds of miles away. Tsunami and earthquake warnings are sent out across California, Oregon, and Washington.
- December 6 – A federal appeals court, in a defeat to TikTok and parent company ByteDance, upholds the Protecting Americans from Foreign Adversary Controlled Applications Act, enabling the law, which would ban the social media platform from the US on January 19, 2025, if the platform was not sold off to an American-owned company, to take effect.
- December 7 – MLS Cup 2024: The LA Galaxy defeat the New York Red Bulls 2–1 to win their sixth MLS Cup.
- December 8 – In baseball, the New York Mets sign Dominican professional baseball outfielder Juan Soto to a $765 million, 15-year contract, the largest contract in sports history.
- December 9
  - Police arrest 26-year-old Luigi Mangione in connection with the fatal shooting of UnitedHealthcare CEO Brian Thompson in New York on December 4.
  - A jury acquits Daniel Penny of criminally negligent homicide and deadlocks on manslaughter over his killing of Jordan Neely in May 2023.
- December 9–10 – The US Navy is attacked in the Gulf of Aden by the Yemen-based Houthis, marking the most recent attack on the United States.
- December 10 – Federal bankruptcy judge Christopher Lopez rejects the sale of Alex Jones' InfoWars to satirical news platform The Onion in a dispute over the bidding process.
- December 11
  - Albertsons backs out of a $24.6 billion merger deal with Kroger and files a lawsuit against them that includes a $600 million termination fee.
  - Several drones of unknown operators are spotted over New Jersey, with some going over military areas.
- December 12 – President Biden commutes the sentences of roughly 1,500 people who were released from prison and placed in home confinement during the coronavirus pandemic and pardons 39 Americans convicted of non-violent crimes, the largest single-day act of clemency in US history. The clemency drew outrage for commuting the sentences of Mark Ciavarella and Michael Conahan for their role in the kids for cash scandal.
- December 13
  - The U.S. military evacuates Travis Timmerman out of Syria after Timmerman had previously been reported missing in the country.
  - McKinsey & Company agrees to pay $650 million and enter a deferred prosecution agreement with the Department of Justice to resolve criminal charges related to its advisory work for Purdue Pharma on increasing OxyContin sales, including conspiracy to misbrand a drug and obstruction of justice.
- December 16
  - Two people are killed and six others are injured in a mass shooting at the Abundant Life Christian School in Madison, Wisconsin. The perpetrator, a 15-year-old student at the school, is found dead at the scene.
  - SoftBank Group announces a $100 billion investment in the United States, expected to create 100,000 new jobs by 2029, primarily in technology-related sectors such as artificial intelligence.
- December 18
  - Indiana conducts its first execution since 2009 with convicted murderer Joseph Corcoran.
  - The CDC confirms the first severe case of H5N1 bird flu in a human linked to exposure to a backyard flock.
  - A Union Pacific train derails and strikes multiple vehicles and a building in Pecos, Texas. Two people are killed and three are injured.
- December 23
  - President Joe Biden commutes the sentences of 37 of the 40 individuals on federal death row to life imprisonment without the possibility of parole. The exceptions are Dylann Roof, Robert Bowers, and Dzhokhar Tsarnaev, who received death sentences for terrorism or hate-motivated mass murder-related crimes, as well as all four prisoners on U.S. military death row.
  - A House ethics report finds "substantial evidence" that Matt Gaetz paid for sex with a 17-year-old girl and used illicit drugs while in office.
- December 24
  - President Joe Biden signs a bill making the bald eagle the official national bird of the United States.
  - American Airlines grounds all U.S. flights for several hours due to a technical issue.
- December 28 – At least 15 people, including three firefighters, are injured when a train collides with a fire truck in Delray Beach, Florida.
- December 29 – Former President Jimmy Carter dies at age 100 in his hometown of Plains, Georgia.
- December 30 – The Treasury reports a "major incident" in which Chinese state-sponsored hackers broke into its systems earlier in the month and had access to employee workstations and some unclassified documents.
