= Ardakani =

Ardakani is a surname. Notable people with the surname include:

- Hossein Hatefi Ardakani, Iranian businessman
- Mohammad Ardakani (born 1955), Iranian politician
- Nour Ardakani (born 2001), Lebanese singer, dancer, and model
- Reza Davari Ardakani (born 1933), Iranian philosopher
- Seyyed Hassan Eslami Ardakani (born 1960), Iranian philosopher and professor of ethics
