= Killing of Mahogany Jackson =

- Location: Birmingham, Alabama, U.S.
- Date: February 24–25, 2024
- Attack type: Torture, rape, homicide
- Victims: Mahogany Jackson, aged 20
- Accused: 8 people

In February 2024, Mahogany Jackson, a 20-year-old woman from Birmingham, Alabama, was tortured, gang raped, and subsequently murdered.

Jackson was taken captive on the night of February 24, and was assaulted repeatedly for several hours, including being dragged by her hair, being forced to strip, and restrained by handcuffs. In the early hours of February 25, Jackson messaged her mother that she was being held hostage and to send police. Investigators believe the accused were made aware of her plea for help, and shot her in the back of the head. Much of her assault was captured on video. The details of her case were described as "deplorable and sickening" by the police as well as one of the most gruesome murders they'd ever seen.

Eight suspects were arrested and charged. Three of the suspects were charged with capital murder, kidnapping, and rape/sodomy. Five others were initially charged with felony murder until a grand jury upgraded their charges to capital murder as well. Two also additionally faced charges of second-degree assault. The eight suspects are Brandon Pope, 25, Francis Harris, 25, Jeremiah McDowell, 19, Blair Green, 26, Si'Niya McCall, 24, Teja Lewis, 26, Giovannie Clapp, 24 and Airana Robinson. The state prosecutor is seeking the death penalty for all of the accused.
