= Abortion in Utah =

Abortion in Utah is legally performed under a temporary restraining order blocking enforcement of the state's trigger law, which bans abortion. According to HB136, which is effective state law from June 28, 2022, abortions are banned following 18 weeks of gestation. Abortion was banned following the Supreme Court case, Dobbs v. Jackson Women's Health Organization on June 24, 2022. Utah State Legislation enacted SB 174 in May 2020, which, upon the overturn of Roe v. Wade, made inducing an abortion a second-degree felony. The law includes exceptions for pregnancies "caused by rape or incest," pregnancies that put the mother's life at risk, or "if two doctors say the fetus has a lethal defect." Rape and incest exceptions will only be viable if the crimes were previously reported to law enforcement officials.

A 2014 Pew Research Center survey found that 51% of Utah adults said abortion should be illegal in all or most cases with 47% saying it should be legal, and a 2022 joint Deseret News/Hinckley Institute of Politics poll found 46% of Utahns thought abortion should be legal only in cases of rape, incest, or threats to mothers’ health.

The number of abortions performed annually in Utah has dropped over the decades with 4,796 abortions performed in 1990 and 2,922 performed in 2019. In 2019, 61.8% of abortions performed in Utah were due to socioeconomic reasons.

== History ==
=== Legislative history ===
In 1876, the Territory of Utah banned the deliberate induction of a miscarriage, except in cases where it was necessary to save a patient's life. Shortly after attaining statehood, the Utah legislature passed a law in 1898 designating a woman who had an abortion or actively sought to have an abortion, regardless of whether she went through with it, as guilty of a criminal offense.

The Supreme Court preempted all state laws restricting and regulating abortion in January 1973 with its decisions in Roe v. Wade and Doe v. Bolton. In March 1973, the state legislature passed the Utah Abortion Act, reinstating the ban on abortion except in cases where the patient's life or health was endangered. The law also required the father's consent before an abortion could be carried out. This law was struck down by the U.S. District Court for the District of Utah in August, citing Roe as evidence that it was unconstitutional.

In February 1974, a weakened version of the state's abortion law was enacted, following the precedent set by Roe. A case against this version of the law, H. L. v. Matheson, was brought to the U.S. Supreme Court in 1981, challenging the provision that the parents of a minor must be notified before an abortion can be administered. The Supreme Court ruled that Utah's requirement, as well as the requirement that the husband of a married woman must be notified, was valid because it did not require their consent or allow the parents or spouse to stop the procedure from taking place. Beginning in the early 1980s, Planned Parenthood became Utah's only Title X grantee and the only abortion service provider in the state.

The Criminal Abortion Act, signed into law by Governor Norman Bangerter in January 1991, was regarded as the strictest abortion law in the nation at the time of passage. It banned abortion except in cases where the patient's life or health was at risk, or where fetal defects were found. Abortions in cases of rape or incest were permitted only until the fifth month of pregnancy. Much of the law was found to be unconstitutional in December 1992. The case of Jane L. v. Bangerter was denied certiorari by the U.S. Supreme Court in 1997, leaving the provisions struck down.

The state was one of 23 states in 2007 to have a detailed abortion-specific informed consent requirement. The informed consent materials in South Dakota, Texas, Utah and West Virginia given to women seeking abortions include counseling materials that say women who have abortions may have suicidal thoughts or experience "post-abortion traumatic stress syndrome," which is not recognized by American Psychological Association or the American Psychiatric Association. In 2013, state Targeted Regulation of Abortion Providers (TRAP) law applied to medication-induced abortions and private doctor offices in addition to abortion clinics. There was a pending bill in Utah in early 2018 to prohibit women from requesting their doctors perform abortions as a result of getting a Down syndrome diagnosis during their pregnancies. The bill was co-sponsored by Republican state Sen. Curt Bramble. In 2019, only 24% of the state legislators were female.

In 2019, the Utah legislature passed a bill limiting abortions after 18 weeks of pregnancy. In 2020, the legislature passed Senate Bill 174 "Abortion Prohibition Amendments" sponsored by Daniel McCay. The bill is a near-total ban on abortion, with exceptions for rape, incest, and the mother's health, but would only go into effect if Roe v. Wade was overturned. The Supreme Court overturned Roe in Dobbs v. Jackson Women's Health Organization in 2022. However, there is a temporary restraining order blocking enforcement of the near-total ban on abortion. But according to another law, HB136, which is effective state law from June 28, 2022, abortions are banned following 18 weeks of gestation.

=== Clinic history ===
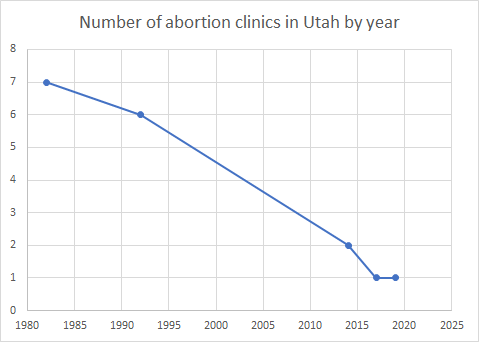
Number of abortion clinics in Utah by year

Between 1982 and 1992, the number of abortion clinics in the state declined by one, going from seven in 1982 to six in 1992. In 1996, the state had seven abortion clinics and was one of only three to gain clinics in the period between 1982 and 1996. In 2014, there were two abortion clinics in the state. In 2014, 97% of the counties in the state did not have an abortion clinic. That year, 62% of women in the state aged 15–44 lived in a county without an abortion clinic. In 2017, there were nine Planned Parenthood clinics, of which one offered abortion services, in a state with a population of 727,940 women aged 15–49. In March 2019, Planned Parenthood Association of Utah was the only abortion provider in the state.

== Statistics ==
In the period between 1972 and 1974, there were zero recorded illegal abortion deaths in the state. In 1990, 202,000 women in the state faced the risk of an unintended pregnancy. In 2013, among white women aged 15–19, there were 290 abortions, 10 abortions for black women aged 15–19, 60 abortions for Hispanic women aged 15–19, and 20 abortions for women of all other races. In 2014, 51% of adults said in a poll by the Pew Research Center that abortion should be illegal in all or most cases with 47% saying it should be legal. In 2017, the state had an infant mortality rate of 5.9 deaths per 1,000 live births, compared to the national average of 5.8 deaths per 1,000 live births. In 2022, a Deseret News/Hinckley Institute of Politics survey found 46% of Utahns said abortion should only be legal in cases of rape, incest, or threats to mothers’ health.

Number of reported abortions, abortion rate and percentage change in rate by geographic region and state in 1992, 1995 and 1996
Census division and state	Number			Rate			% change 1992–1996
Census division and state	1992	1995	1996	1992	1995	1996	% change 1992–1996
US total	1,528,930	1,363,690	1,365,730	25.9	22.9	22.9	–12
Mountain	69,600	63,390	67,020	21	17.9	18.6	–12
Arizona	20,600	18,120	19,310	24.1	19.1	19.8	–18
Colorado	19,880	15,690	18,310	23.6	18	20.9	–12
Idaho	1,710	1,500	1,600	7.2	5.8	6.1	–15
Montana	3,300	3,010	2,900	18.2	16.2	15.6	–14
Nevada	13,300	15,600	15,450	44.2	46.7	44.6	1
New Mexico	6,410	5,450	5,470	17.7	14.4	14.4	–19
Utah	3,940	3,740	3,700	9.3	8.1	7.8	–16
Wyoming	460	280	280	4.3	2.7	2.7	–37

Number, rate, and ratio of reported abortions, by reporting area of residence and occurrence and by percentage of abortions obtained by out-of-state residents, US CDC estimates
Location	Residence			Occurrence			% obtained by out-of-state residents	Year	Ref
Location	No.	Rate^	Ratio^^	No.	Rate^	Ratio^^	% obtained by out-of-state residents	Year	Ref
Utah	2,905	4.5	57	2,948	4.6	58	6.1	2014	
Utah	3,123	4.8	62	3,176	4.9	63	6	2015	
Utah	2,956	4.5	59	3,008	4.5	60	6.6	2016	
^number of abortions per 1,000 women aged 15–44; ^^number of abortions per 1,000 live births

== Public responses ==
=== Protests ===
In a 2019 national "Stop the Bans" protest, hundreds of Utahns gathered to protest several laws which limited or banned abortion across the United States. The largest protest took place outside the Utah State Capitol, in Salt Lake City. A smaller protest also took place in the city of Provo. In both events, protesters called on state legislators not to pass any laws further restricting abortion. The protests also centered around bills from other states, particularly Ohio, Alabama, and other southern states.

Following the overturn of Roe v. Wade on June 24, 2022, abortion rights protesters demonstrated outside the Utah State Capitol in Salt Lake City. Protests were also held in Provo on June 25.

=== Activism ===
Much of the anti-abortion movement in the United States and around the world finds support in the Roman Catholic Church, the Christian right, the Lutheran Church–Missouri Synod and the Wisconsin Evangelical Lutheran Synod, the Church of England, the Anglican Church in North America, the Eastern Orthodox Church, and the Church of Jesus Christ of Latter-day Saints (LDS Church).

The position of the Church of Jesus Christ of Latter-day Saints is that "elective abortion for personal or social convenience is contrary to the will and the commandments of God" but that abortion may be justified where the pregnancy endangers life of the mother, where the pregnancy is the outcome of rape or incest, or the fetus is not viable.
