= 2024 Mānoa murders =

Mass murder in Hawaii, United States

- The Oda family
- Location: Mānoa, Hawaii, US
- Date: March 10, 2024
- Attack type: Mass murder, familicide, murder-suicide
- Weapon: Knife
- Deaths: 5 (including the perpetrator)
- Injuries: 0
- Perpetrator: Paris Oda
- Motive: Financial distress

On March 10, 2024, a familicide occurred in Mānoa, Hawaii, a neighborhood of Honolulu. Paris Oda (46) murdered his wife Naoko (48) and their three children, Sakurako (17), Orion (12), and Nana (10) before killing himself in a murder-suicide. Oda used a kitchen knife to fatally stab himself and his family. It is Hawaii's deadliest mass killing since the Xerox murders in 1999 and the worst familicide in Hawaii since 1965.

== Background ==
Paris was under severe financial trouble in 2023, and in February 2024, he revealed to his wife that he had not paid taxes in years, while telling relatives that he would rather die than go to prison for unpaid taxes. He also stated that "he wanted to kill his family and burn the house down." He had texted his wife that they needed a plan to "do it" and take their children with them because he believed no one else could take care of them. Paris unsuccessfully attempted to purchase a firearm in March. He did not have any history of violence.

== Murders ==
Police first received an anonymous call at 8:30 a.m. regarding an argument and screaming within the home. Officers were sent to the home at 8:34 a.m. When the officers arrived, they knocked on the door, however, there was no answer, and they were not able to locate the caller. Officers heard no screaming and so left the scene. The 911 caller had called from an international phone number so the officers were unable to call back. The same caller later called again and police returned to the house at 9:15 a.m. and met the caller, a tenant who lived inside the house. Between 2:00 and 2:30 a.m. the tenant heard screaming while she was inside her room. She stated that when the officers first arrived, she was too scared to leave her room as blood was seeping underneath her bedroom door. The officers found the front door locked, but were able to make out an unresponsive person through a window. The officers entered the house through the back door where they found Paris lying dead in the hallway with self inflicted stab wounds. After searching the rest of the house officers soon discovered the bodies of Naoko, Sakurako, Orion, and Nana dead from multiple stab wounds. All the victims had defense wounds on their hands and wrists.

== Aftermath ==
A candlelight vigil was held at the Waikiki Shell and drew hundreds of attendees. Mayor Rick Blangiardi released a statement expressing his condolences, and called the event an "inexplicable tragedy."
