= 2024 Rochester attack =

2024 attack in Rochester, New York

- Location: Rochester, New York
- Date: January 1, 2024; 00:50
- Attack type: Suicide bombing, firebombing, car bombing
- Weapon: 2023 Ford Expedition
- Deaths: 4 (including the perpetrator)
- Injuries: 8
- Perpetrator: Michael Avery

On the morning of January 1, 2024, a vehicle laden with canisters of gasoline driven by Michael Avery exploded after crashing into another vehicle in front of the Kodak Theater, which was hosting New Year's Eve celebrations. Justina Hughes and Joshua Orr, two occupants of the vehicle, were killed along with Avery. The Federal Bureau of Investigation are investigating the incident as a hate crime and act of terrorism, though Rochester Police later indicated there was no evidence of a bias-related attack.

== Attack ==
A New Year's Eve concert was occurring at the Kodak Theater in Rochester, New York, which attracted approximately 1,000 guests. At 12:50 a.m. ET, concertgoers began leaving the venue and crossing the street via a nearby crosswalk. The suspect, driving a rented 2023 Ford Expedition, began to drive toward the crosswalk at an accelerated rate of speed crossing into the oncoming lane of traffic. The suspect's vehicle hit a Mitsubishi Outlander with two passengers in the back seat that was leaving a nearby parking lot, causing the suspect's vehicle to catch on fire around that time. The two passengers, Justina Hughes, 28 and Joshua Orr, 29, in the Mitsubishi along with the perpetrator were killed while 9 others were wounded.

A third victim, Dawn Revette, died of her injuries several weeks later.

Rochester Mayor Malik Evans described the event as "An assault on Rochester, period. This was an assault on innocent people. And it’s obvious from his actions that he wanted do more."

== Perpetrator ==
Authorities named 35-year-old Michael Avery (1988 – January 1, 2024) as the perpetrator of the attack. Avery lived in North Syracuse, New York at the time of the attack according to public records, located next to Syracuse which is 87 miles east of Rochester. Police recovered video of Avery purchasing gasoline and gasoline canisters at various locations within both Monroe and Ontario counties on December 30, a day after Avery left his personal vehicle at Frederick Douglass Greater Rochester International Airport. Two days prior to it, Avery rented a WoodSpring Suites hotel room in neighboring Greece.

From 2003 until 2016, Avery had a long history of minor interactions with law enforcement all across Onondaga County, including incidents in Syracuse, North Syracuse, Warners, Baldwinsville, Geddes, and Camillus. Avery graduated from West Genesee High School in Camillus in 2007.
