= Tornado outbreak sequence of May 19–27, 2024 =

Tornado outbreak sequence in the United States

The tornado outbreak sequence of May 19–27, 2024 consists of two separate tornado outbreaks over the period of a week in the United States in May 2024.

- Tornado outbreak of May 19–22, 2024 – Major tornado outbreak in the Central U.S. that spawned over 80 tornadoes, and produced a violent tornado in Greenfield, Iowa with the third-highest tornadic wind speeds recorded.
- Tornado outbreak of May 25–27, 2024 – Another major and deadlier tornado outbreak that produced nearly 100 tornadoes in the southern and southeastern U.S. several days after the previous one.
