= First Church of Christ (New London, Connecticut) =

Gothic Revival church (destroyed 2024)

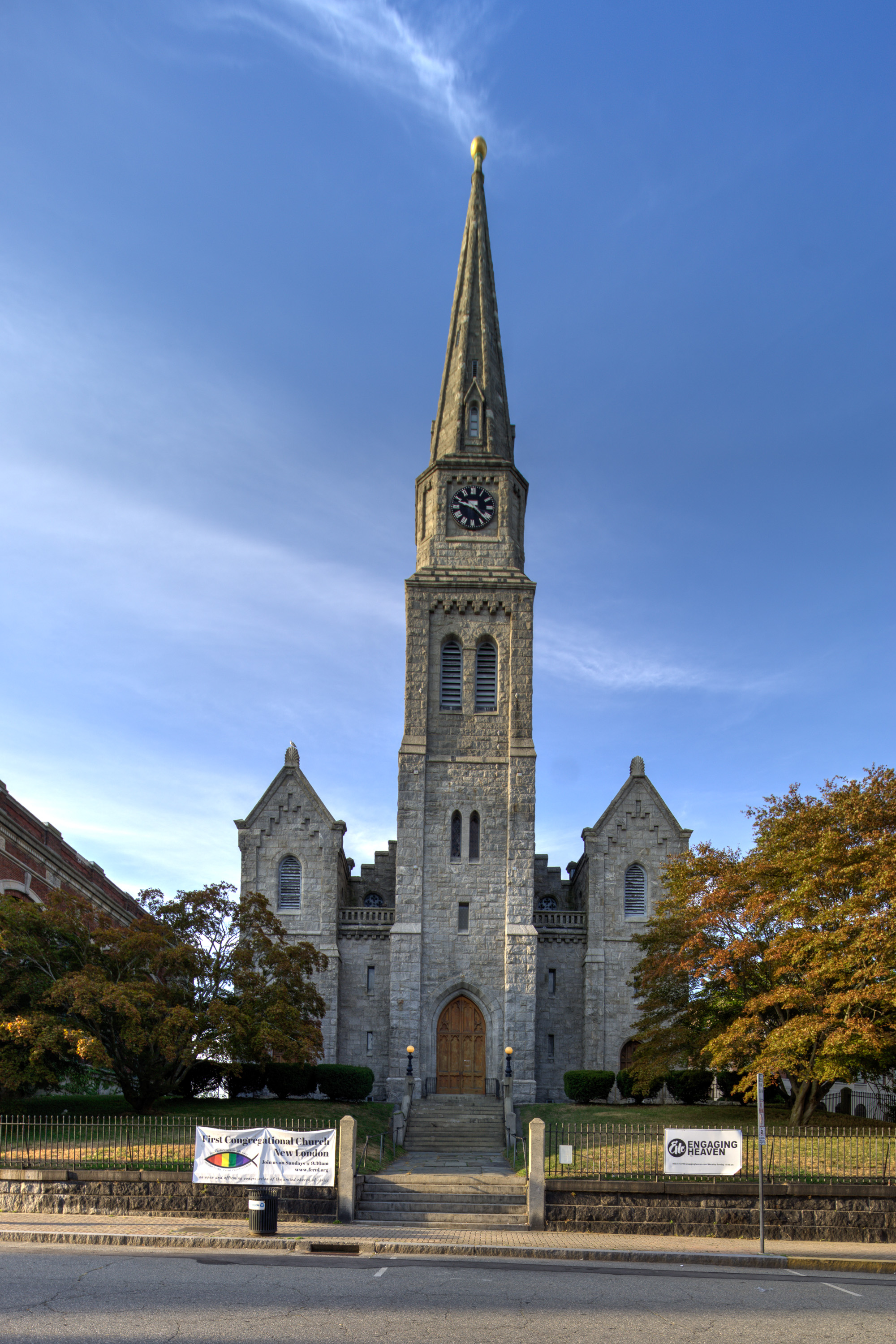
- The church in 2020

Religion
- Affiliation: Christian
- Ecclesiastical or organisational status: Destroyed

Location
- Location: New London, Connecticut
- Interactive map of First Church of Christ
- Coordinates: 41.3551°N 72.0969°W

Architecture
- Architect: Leopold Eidlitz
- Style: Gothic Revival
- Groundbreaking: May 28, 1852
- Completed: 1853
- Construction cost: US$28,000
- Destroyed: January 25, 2024

Specifications
- Capacity: 1,100
- Spire: 1
- Spire height: 150 ft (45.7 Meters)

The First Church of Christ, also called the First Congregational Church, was a Gothic Revival-style church located in New London, Connecticut. It was constructed between 1850 and 1853, designed by Prague-born architect Leopold Eidlitz. This large granite edifice featured a tall central spire, rising in three stages and topped by a gold ball, typical of significant buildings in Prague. The central bell tower was flanked by two lower towers with pitched roofs. The church occupied a prominent position on Union Street, across from the City Hall, and anchoring the Downtown New London Historic District.

Due to a sudden loss of structural integrity, its steeple completely and almost instantaneously collapsed at 1:30 pm on January 25, 2024. Demolition of the rest of the building was completed the following week.

== History ==
The building traced its history to a congregation originally formed by early settlers to New London in the 1600s. The prior meeting house had been built in 1786 but was damaged by fire in February, 1848. The congregation then commissioned Eidlitz to design a new structure. Construction took place in 1850-1853, and the building was dedicated in July 1853.

In 1876, a bell was installed in the church tower. The town of New London used the bell as a fire alarm and as a way to call people to meetings. In 1975, an annex building was added to the rear of the church.

By the early 2000s, the church was serving free breakfast on weekday mornings. They also held remembrance services for homeless people from the area who had died.

In 2011, Engaging Heaven Church began using the space for their services. In 2015, the building was sold for $250,000 to Engaging Heaven Church. The original congregation had a shrinking number of members and no longer had sufficient funds to maintain the building. The two congregations continued to share use of the building. A few years later, part of the building's roof was replaced.

=== Steeple collapse ===
The church's steeple collapsed on itself and on the roof of the church at 1:30 pm on January 25, 2024, destroying much of the building. The only person in the building was the church office manager who was able to evacuate without sustaining injuries.

New London's Mayor Passero told the press that the building was likely a complete loss, as the structural soundness of the remainder could not be determined. According to initial reports, church and city leadership had not seen any previous structural issues with the church. The building's most recent fire inspection had been in 2019, during which three minor violations were found and fixed.

However, as far back as 1851, the original architect had warned of a structural issue with unsatisfactory masonry work. From the 1930s until the actual collapse, the top of the steeple had moved 19 inches (48 cm).

In 2011, a condition report on the building was conducted but the team did not have a structural engineer involved. The photos included in that 2011 report identified areas of water infiltration through failing sections of the slate roof, and stress fractures in the exterior granite mortar. That report identified cracks in the masonry and issues with roof flashing. In total, about $700,000 in repairs and upgrades were needed, some of which applied to the exterior fabric of the building but were not subsequently addressed or monitored. Prior to that date, steel tie rods had been inserted to re-enforce sections of the tower walls.

Architects, engineers, and preservationists have been studying images of the church in order to speculate about the cause of the collapse and to identify risks to other similar structures. The possible explanations for the collapse include masonry deterioration, rusting of the metal tie rods, and foundation failure.

The structure likely suffered from a long period of deferred maintenance. At the moment of the collapse, the tower tipped backwards over the roof of the church, suggesting that the weakness was at the back of the tower. Signs of displacement in the NW buttress and deformation in the roof framing have been identified through close retrospective analysis of photos captured prior to the collapse. At the front of the tower, there were deficiencies in water drainage from the balconies that ran on either side of the spire, next to the left and right side towers, allowing water to infiltrate.

Environmental conditions that may have aggravated structural weaknesses include: high levels of ground saturation from a recent rainfall with a record-breaking 4 inches (100 mm) falling on January 9, 2024, compounding subsidence and other water infiltration and drainage problems; repeated damage from freeze-thaw cycles; and vibrations from pile driving for building the wind energy infrastructure at the nearby State Pier. However given the solid bedrock at the church's foundation, it is more likely that the original faulty masonry aggravated by unaddressed water infiltration was the cause.

In response to the collapse, Connecticut College evacuated their nearby dormitory Manwaring Hall. Subsequently it was found that the collapse of the church damaged the retaining wall of Manwaring Hall. On the day of the collapse, the authorities in New London closed City Hall and a post office in an effort to prevent traffic near the site.

It was determined that the remainder of the structure could not be saved. Demolition on the church began on January 26, 2024, and was completed on February 1. The bell and the organ were also destroyed. The 1970s annex building, though condemned, remained standing until its eventual demolition later in the year. The rubble from the church remained on site awaiting an environmental assessment. The City of New London placed a lien on Engaging Heaven Church for the expense of securing the site after the collapse and subsequent complete demolition, which cost nearly $250,000. Six months after the collapse, plans were underway to sell the site to a housing developer. Eastern Connecticut Housing Opportunities (ECHO) purchased the site and construction began in 2026.
