= Hossein Hatefi Ardakani =

Iranian businessman

- Occupation: Businessman
- Years active: 2014–present
- Organization: Allegedly connected to the Islamic Revolutionary Guard Corps (IRGC)
- Known for: Alleged involvement in procuring military drone technology for the IRGC
- Criminal charge: Indicted by the U.S. Department of Justice (2023)
- Criminal penalty: Indictment unsealed in December 2023

Hossein Hatefi Ardakani is an Iranian businessman. He has been accused of helping the Iranian Revolutionary Guard Corps in acquiring military drone technology. In January 2024, the United States offered up to a $15 million reward for information about Ardakani. He is alleged to have worked with an individual based in China to purchase parts using front companies that were eventually used in Iranian drones.

== Allegations by the U.S. Government ==
The Rewards for Justice program, managed by the U.S. Department of State, is offering a reward of up to $15 million for information that could lead to the disruption of financial networks supporting the Islamic Revolutionary Guard Corps (IRGC), which the U.S. government designates as a terrorist organization. According to U.S. officials, Iranian businessman Hossein Hatefi Ardakani is alleged to have played a significant role in procuring and transferring technology used in the IRGC’s weapons development activities.

Since 2014, Ardakani is accused of utilizing a complex network of intermediary companies to acquire sensitive components for Iran's military programs. U.S. government sources assert that these materials have been used in producing Shahed-136 and Shahed-131 unmanned aerial vehicles (UAVs), which are developed on behalf of the IRGC. It is further alleged that some of these UAVs have been sold internationally, including to the Russian Armed Forces for use in the war in Ukraine, with proceeds benefiting the IRGC.

Recovered wreckage of Shahed drones in Ukraine and other conflict areas reportedly contains U.S.-origin flight guidance components, which U.S. officials claim were acquired through Ardakani's network. Additionally, the U.S. government alleges that Ardakani has obtained export-controlled high electron mobility transistors (HEMTs) and other electronic components with ballistic missile applications, circumventing sanctions and export controls targeting Iran.

Several Malaysia-based companies, such as Arta Wave Sdn Bhd, Integrated Scientific Microwave Technologies, and Tecknologi Merak Sdn Bhd, have been identified by U.S. authorities as front companies operating on Ardakani’s behalf. These firms, registered in Kuala Lumpur with links to Hong Kong, have reportedly, according to the US government, acquired restricted materials for Iran’s defense sector. Similarly, logistics firms in the United Arab Emirates (UAE), including Dubai-based Smart Mail Services and Ring Field FZE, are accused of facilitating the shipment of sensitive components to the IRGC by providing false shipping information.

On December 19, 2023, the U.S. Department of Justice unsealed an indictment against the businessman, accusing him of illegally procuring dual-use microelectronics for the IRGC. On the same day, the U.S. Department of the Treasury designated Ardakani and ten associated entities under Executive Order (E.O.) 13382, which targets individuals and entities involved in the proliferation of weapons of mass destruction. As a result, U.S. persons and entities are prohibited from conducting transactions with Ardakani.
