= List of mass stabbings by death toll =

This list excludes state-sanctioned killings (executions, genocides, etc.) or massacres done by military or paramilitary forces, and only includes civilian/terrorist mass murders. The list is organized by number of victims killed by knives, swords, axes, or other sharp weapons. Attacks where blades were a secondary weapon are included if they fit the criteria of at least three victims, and the number can be verified. Some entries on this list are incidences where stabbings occur prior to or after other attacks by the same perpetrator, such as mass shootings or vehicle-ramming attacks. Attacks where bladed weapons were unused are not included. Cases where multiple weapons, including knives, are used, but the exact number of victims stabbed/bludgeoned is unclear, will not be included on the list. Perpetrators that were killed or injured are omitted from the list.

This list defines a mass stabbing as any spree killing where at least 3 people are stabbed, bludgeoned, or struck with any kind of bladed weapon.

== List ==
Date	Location	Country	Dead	Injured	Total	Weapons used	Description
Unknown, < 1905	Siquijor	Philippines	32	?	32	Bolo knife	A man killed around 32 people leaving a church with a Bolo knife, then killed more in a nearby town until he was stoned to death by locals. (Note: Unconfirmed event.)
March 1, 2014	Kunming, Yunnan	China	31	143	174	Knives, cleavers	2014 Kunming attack: Five East Turkestan Islamic Movement terrorists attacked people in a waiting area of Kunming railway station. Four attackers were shot dead by police while another was arrested.
October 6, 2022	Nong Bua Lamphu	Thailand	25 (Note: Excludes victims killed by vehicle or gunfire. Includes 23 children killed at the nursery and 2 adults fatally stabbed outside.)	1+	26+	Curved Knife	2022 Nong Bua Lamphu massacre: 34-year-old Panya Khamrab went on a killing spree across Nong Bua Lamphu, using a 9mm pistol, a knife, and his truck to attack people. After the attacks, he shot his wife and stepson dead before committing suicide.
Unknown, 1903	Mindanao	Philippines	23	?	23	Kris	A man killed 23 Christians with a Kris in Mindanao at some point in 1903.
Either February 1954 or mid-1955	Angala Village, Mahagi	Belgian Congo	22	?	22	Machete	William Unek held a banquet for 22 family members, murdering twenty of them in their sleep while killing two others after fleeing the scene. William evaded capture and was later killed in 1957, after perpetrating a mass shooting and axe attack in northern Tanganyika.
May 27, 2021	Beni	(Democratic Republic of the Congo) DR Congo	22	?	22	Knives, machetes	A group of Islamist militants entered a Congolese town and proceeded to stab people while raiding the village. 22 people were killed.
April 21, 1950	Nainital, Uttarakhand	India	22	0	22	Machete	A drunk Ghurka soldier fatally stabbed 22 wedding guests after being enraged by a low-caste money lender marrying a girl of the higher social-standing Brahmin caste. All of the victims were members of the Harijan caste.
April 15, 1987	Banyuwangi Regency	Indonesia	20	12	32	Parang	1987 Banyuwangi massacre: 42-year-old Wirjo killed twenty neighbors and injured twelve others in the villages of Banjarsari and Boyolangu. He killed himself in a suicide by hanging during the manhunt.
July 26, 2016	Midori-ku, Sagamihara	Japan	19	26	45	Yanagi-ba knives, hammer	Sagamihara stabbings: 19 people were killed and 26 injured (13 seriously) at a care home, targeting disabled people. The perpetrator, 26-year-old Satoshi Uematsu, was arrested and sentenced to death on March 16, 2020. As of February 2026, Uematsu is awaiting execution.
September 29, 2016	Qujing, Yunnan	China	19	0	19	Pickaxe	2016 Yema village stabbings: 27-year-old Yang Qingpei murdered his parents after an argument about money, before stabbing 17 neighbors to death in an attempt to cover up the crime. Yang was apprehended in Kunming and sentenced to death on July 28, 2017.
October 11, 1956	Roxas, Palawan	Philippines	18 (Note: Including two unborn infants)	1	19	Spear, Bolo knife	1956 San Nicolas murders: Domingo Salazar murdered his pregnant wife and her sister before entering 4 residences and killing everyone inside with a Spear and Bolo knife. He then attempted to enter a school to no success. He was subsequently arrested by police.
March 19, 1989	Nafang, Guangxi	China	17	2	19	Knife	Huang Guozhen killed his brother and his wife at their house before lighting it on fire, then killed 15 others with a large knife at a market. He would be subdued by bystanders and arrested, being sentenced to death and executed 10 days later.
January 1, 1976	Zixing	China	17	0	17	Kitchen Knife	Ou Yangpu fatally stabbed 17 members of his family with a kitchen knife before hanging himself in a nearby forest.
February 28, 2012	Yecheng, Xinjiang	China	16	18	34	Knives, axes	2012 Yecheng attack: Nine Uyghur separatists attacked a Han neighborhood, killing 15 civilians and one police officer before eight assailants were killed by police.
May 9, 1977	Quezon, Palawan	Philippines	15	4	19	Knife	Florentino Basobas killed 15 people around his town with a knife before being killed by the civil guard.
May 27, 1897	Keningau	North Borneo	15	3	18	Knife	1897 Gunsat's Kampong murders: Antakin murdered his wife after finding out she had an affair, then stabbed random people along the street with an until he was shot dead.
April 24, 2024	Shenyang, Liaoning	China	13	9	22	Knife	A man stabbed several people with a knife at Pattaya Hot Spring Bathing Center over a dispute, then stabbed more people on the street indiscriminately before being arrested by police.
February 28, 2016	Thane, Maharashtra	India	13	1	14	Knife	32-year-old Hasnain Anwar Warekar killed 13 members of his family with a large knife at a family celebration by slitting their throats before committing suicide via hanging. The suspects' sister survived the attack but was critically injured.
February 18, 2003	Huludao, Liaoning	China	13	0	13	Kitchen knife, wooden stick	2003 Huludao murders: Guo Zhongmin stabbed his neighbors to death across three houses, killing 13 people and fleeing the scene. He then committed suicide by ingesting insecticide after being surrounded by police 5 days later.
June 22, 1952	Manila	Philippines	12	14	26	Bolo	Two men attacked women and children aboard an inter-island ship with bolo knives. One attacker was shot dead by a security officer, while another was subdued by police and navy patrolmen. 6 later died in the hospital.
August 8, 1998	Krông Pắk District	Vietnam	12	7	18	Two knives	Krông Pắk stabbing: 35-year-old rice farmer Dương Văn Môn killed twelve people and injured six others through a village in Krông Pắk District. He tried to commit suicide by swallowing insecticide, but was forced to vomit it when he was captured by villagers. He was sentenced to death in November 1998.
September 24–29, 2006	Tonghua, Jilin	China	12	5	17	Knife	Tonghua murders: 35-year-old Shi Yuejun stabbed 17 victims across various locations between September 24 and 29 before being arrested.
November 13, 1952	Banga, Aklan	Philippines	12	4	16	Bolo	Salvador Rublico stabbed 12 people to death with a Bolo across 5 different houses before he was shot dead.
May 19, 1929	Kitale	Kenya Colony	12	1	13	Spear	Kitale murders: Mogo killed his wife and infant child before killing 10 others at a farm. He was sentenced to death by hanging and was executed on January 23, 1930.
July 28, 1950	Mulago, Kampala	Protectorate of Uganda	12	0	12	Knife	Mulago hospital murders: 55-year-old Lazaro Obwara fatally stabbed 11 children and a mother to death in the pediatric ward at the Mulago Government African Hospital while visiting his terminally ill son. He was arrested at the scene and charged with 10 counts of murder.
October 6, 2000	Heyang County, Shaanxi	China	12	0	12	Axe	Jia Yingmin killed 12 people, including members of his own family, with an axe before hanging himself.
September 4, 2022	Saskatchewan	Canada	11	17	28	Kitchen knife, scissors	2022 Saskatchewan stabbings: Myles Sanderson killed 11 people (including his brother, Damien) and injured 17 others at various locations in James Smith Cree Nation and Weldon until being apprehended by police. Shortly after being arrested, Myles overdosed on cocaine and died.
October 9, 1947	Bangi, Selangor	Malayan Union	11	10	21	Pocket knife	1947 Bangi stabbing: Mat Taram bin Sa'al stabbed 21 people aboard a FMSR and in a train station with a pocket knife until he was arrested.
February 18, 1942	El Corozo, Trujillo	Venezuela	11	4	15	Hatchet, Knife	50-year-old farmer Gregorio Cáceres killed 11 people and injured 4 others with a Hatchet and knife in the village of El Corozo before escaping into the jungle, where he was shot dead by police.
July 26, 1764	Greencastle, Pennsylvania	(United States) British America	11	1	12	Unknown	Enoch Brown school massacre: Four Delaware Lenape warriors stormed a wooden school in Pennsylvania and attacked 11 students with bladed weapons, scalping them, as well as a teacher who was also scalped and shot. 11 of the twelve victims died in the attack.
October 21, 1921	Cotabato	Philippines	11	0	11	Bolo	A man named Andangan killed 11 members of his family with a Bolo before taking his own life.
November 10, 1805	Clarksburg, Virginia	United States	10 (Note: Including an unborn infant)	0	10	Axe	Clemmons family murders: Abel Clemmons murdered his pregnant wife and 8 children at their home with an axe, before being arrested several days later. He was executed by hanging in June 1806.
August 4, 1985	Macau	Portuguese Macau	10	0	10	Broken glass bottle	Eight Immortals Restaurant murders: Huang Zhiheng killed the ten-person Zheng family in the Eight Immortals Restaurant in Macau over gambling debt. After disposing of the bodies, he continued to run the restaurant until his arrest on September 28, 1986.
April 27, 2018	Mizhi County, Shaanxi	China	9	12	21	Knives, dagger	Mizhi County middle school stabbing: 28-year-old Zhao Zewei stabbed nine students to death and wounded 12 others at No. 3 Middle School in Mizhi County, using three knives and a dagger. Students and staff eventually subdued him before he was arrested. He was sentenced to death on July 10, 2018, and executed on September 27.
May 12, 2010	Nanzheng District, Shaanxi	China	9	11	20	Cleaver	Shengshui Temple kindergarten attack: Wu Huanming, 48, stormed a kindergarten with a cleaver, attacking several children and adults. This resulted in nine deaths – seven children and two adults – and injuries to 11 others. Wu then killed himself by cutting his own throat.
November 26, 2004	Ruzhou, Henan	China	9	3	12	Knife	21-year-old Yan Yanming, armed with a knife, attacked twelve male students, killing nine of them in a school dormitory, before fleeing and later being captured by Chinese authorities.
December 28, 2025	Richelieu, Commewijne District	Suriname	9	2	11	Knife	2025 Richelieu stabbing: 43-year-old Dennis Aroma killed four of his own children and five neighbors following a dispute with his wife. Aroma was arrested and committed suicide a day later while in custody.
November 24, 2025	Steung Trang, Kampong Cham	Cambodia	9	0	9	Unknown, arson	21-year-old Soben Minea stabbed to death 8 members of his family before setting the house on fire, fleeing the scene and killing one more.
April 27, 2004	Wakiso	Uganda	9	0	9	Panga, axe	Christopher Kasoma murdered seven of his children, including his pregnant daughter, along with his grandson, with a panga and axe before killing himself with poison.
August 6, 1887	Bibb County, Georgia.	United States	9	0	9	Axe	Woolfolk murders: 9 members of the Woolfolk family were murdered with an axe in the early morning hours of August 6, 1887. Thomas Woolfolk, the 27-year-old son of two of the victims, stepbrother of six victims, and nephew of one, was convicted and sentenced to death. Due to a change of venue in his trial, he was executed by hanging in Houston County, Georgia, on October 29, 1890. Some historians have alleged the murders were instead committed by a man named Simon Cooper, while others contend Tom Woolfolk was properly identified as the murderer.
May 14, 1906	Allentown, Florida	United States	9	0	9	Axe	The nine-person family of William Glenn Acreman, including his wife and 7 children, were found dead in their house in Allentown, Florida. The house was set on fire after the killings, and the suspect remains unknown.
April 27, 1912	Steamboat Africa	Atlantic Ocean	8	23	31	Axe	While aboard a Portugeuese steamboat near São Tomé and Príncipe, a man killed 8 people and wounded 23 others with an axe before being fatally shot.
November 16, 2024	Wuxi, Jiangsu	China	8	17	25	Knife	2024 Wuxi stabbing: Eight deaths and 17 injuries were reported at the Wuxi Vocational Institute of Arts and Technology after student Xu Jiajin attacked them with a knife.
June 8, 2001	Ikeda, Osaka Prefecture	Japan	8	15	23	Deba Knife, Bunka knife(unused)	Ikeda school massacre: 37-year-old Mamoru Takuma killed 8 students and wounded 16 other students and staff members before being subdued at Ikeda Elementary School. Takuma was sentenced to death in August 2003, and was executed in September 2004.
March 30, 1959	Labyrinth	Jamaica	8	14	22	Machete, Ice Pick, Dagger	26-year-old Thaddeus Hyatt stabbed 22 people, 8 fatally, in the town of Labyrinth on Easter Monday. He was arrested and sentenced to death.
March 23, 2010	Nanping, Fujian	China	8	5	13	Knife	Nanping school massacre: 41-year-old Zheng Minsheng killed eight students and injured five others in a stabbing at Nanping City Experimental Elementary School. Minsheng was sentenced to death on April 8, 2010, and was executed 20 days later.
September 2, 2019	Enshi City, Hubei	China	8	2	10	Knife	A 40-year-old man with the surname Yu attacked students at the Chaoyangpo Elementary School on the first day of classes. He was arrested shortly afterwards.
December 19, 2014	Cairns, Queensland	Australia	8	0	8	Knife	Cairns child killings: 37-year-old Raina Mersane Ina Thaiday stabbed eight of her children to death. Thaiday had been hospitalized for 35 self-inflicted stab wounds after the attacks. Thaiday was deemed unfit to stand trial by reason of insanity due to undiagnosed schizophrenia and placed in a psychiatric facility indefinitely.
February 19–20, 2008	Tegucigalpa & San Juan de Flores	Honduras	8	0	8	Machete	20-year-old Elías Ipsaú Lagos Colindres killed eight people in two separate attacks in Tegucigalpa and San Juan de Flores, including five members of his adoptive family, before being arrested and later convicted in 2009.
July 13, 1966	Chicago, Illinois	United States	8	0	8	Knife, strangulation	Richard Speck broke into a townhouse in Chicago and murdered/raped eight student nurses through stabbing and strangulation. Four days later, Speck was arrested at a hospital and sentenced to death in 1967 until his death sentence was reversed in 1971.
June 9, 1912	Villisca, Iowa	United States	8	0	8	Axe	Villisca axe murders: 6 members of the Moore family and 2 guests were found dead in the Moore family home in Villisca. The perpetrator remains unknown as of 2026.
September 25–26, 1786	Cape Town	(Dutch East India Company) Dutch Cape Colony	7	14	21	Kris, "Small curved dagger", various other bladed weapons	Soera Brotto killed 7 men and wounded 10 others around Cape Colony before being captured the next day, wounding 4 more while resisting arrest and receiving a wound to his head.
June 5, 2021	Anqing	China	7	13	20	Knife	2021 Anqing stabbing: 25-year-old Wu Liang stabbed pedestrians along a street in Yingjiang District before being apprehended at a Bus station shortly afterwards.
March 8, 1989	Chantada, Galicia	Spain	7	6	14	Knife, Axe	Chantada stabbing: 64-year-old Paulino Vázquez stabbed his neighbors with a knife and axe, killing 7 and wounding several others before returning home and lighting his own house on fire, killing himself in the process.
March 26, 1975	Kachin State	Burma	7	5	12	Machete	U Win-maung, the principal of a primary school in northern Burma, attacked students with a machete inside a classroom. 7 students were killed while 5 more were injured. 5 other students escaped unharmed. Win-maung was killed by police shortly afterwards.
April 1, 1996	Yizhang County, Henan	China	7	5	12	Unknown	Wang Xiangjun, a mentally ill man, killed seven students and injured five others at two different schools.
October 9, 2021	Redcliff, Midlands	Zimbabwe	7	3	10	Knife, Axe, Spear	26-year-old Thubelihle Khoshow stabbed 10 people at an all-night church vigil in the Stone Clare Suburb of Redcliff, killing 7.
January 30, 1969	Buffalo Narrows, Saskatchewan	Canada	7	1	8	Axe	Buffalo Narrows murders: Frederick McCallum broke into a home, killing 6 members of the Pederson family and a guest with an axe, along with injuring one son. McCallum was arrested and found not guilty by reason of insanity.
May 10, 1899	Klaukkala, Nurmijärvi	Finland	7	0	7	Axe	Karl Emil Malmelin, a 25-year-old farmworker at the Simola farm, murdered 7 of the household members at the Croft after the crofter's daughter, Edla Aspelin, refused his marriage proposal.
February 27–28, 1967	Bukovice and Vlčice, Jeseník District	Czechoslovakia	7	0	7	Axe, shotgun barrel	Josef Svoboda (mass murderer), a 43-year-old man suffering from paranoia, anger issues and with a long history of anti-social behaviour, murdered his three sons at his home and then went to a his parents-in-law' farmhouse near Vlčice where his wife, who was seeking a divorce, was staying due to being afraid of him. Upon reaching the house, he broke inside and murdered his wife's parents and daughter. Svoboda later struck a 17-year old neighbour, who went to the farmhouse to investigate, in the head with his axe and punctured her chest with a barrel of a shotgun. After failing to reach his wife, who escaped to the roof, Svoboda fled the scene and after several suicide attempts, he killed himself by jumping into a nearby quarry.
July 15, 1963	Rio Bueno	Chile	7	0	7	Knife, axe	43-year-old baker Luis Sandoval Troncoso killed his wife and six children with a knife and axe before hanging himself
August 27–28, 2001	Sioux City, Iowa	United States	7	0	7	Hammer	Adam Moss bludgeons his girlfriend, her five children and his boss to death. His motive remains unknown.
April 22, 2025	Antipolo, Rizal	Philippines	7	0	7	Two knives	32-year-old Bogart Ramirez stabbed 7 of his coworkers to death with two knives at a bakery. He was arrested shortly after.
August 20, 2001	Sacramento, California	United States	7	0	7	Knife	Nikolay Soltys fatally stabbed his pregnant wife, Lyubov, at their home in North Highlands before driving to Rancho Cordova, where he killed his aunt, uncle, and two young cousins. He then picked up his 3-year-old son, Sergey, and killed him in a remote field the next day. He was then arrested by authorities after a 10-day manhunt.
June 2, 1982	Kowloon	Hong Kong	6	37	43	Two knives, two chisels	Anne Anne Kindergarten stabbing: 28-year-old Lee Chi-hang killed his mother and sister at his home before carrying out an attack at Anne Anne Kindergarten.
November 24, 1932	Seattle	United States	6	13	19	Bolo	Julian Marcelino went on a stabbing spree in Seattle's Chinatown district, fatally stabbing 6 people and injuring 13 others with a Bolo. He surrendered to police around half an hour later.
April 13, 2024	Sydney, New South Wales	Australia	6	10	16	Ka-Bar knife	Bondi Junction stabbings: 40-year-old Joel Cauchi fatally stabbed six people at Westfield Bondi Junction in Sydney, Australia, before being shot dead by a police officer.
June 3, 2017	London	United Kingdom	6	6+	12+	Ceramic knives	2017 London Bridge attack: 3 Islamic terrorists struck pedestrians with a van across the London Bridge before exiting their vehicle and stabbing bystanders in the Borough Market area. All 3 attackers were shot dead by responding officers, some of whom were injured during the attack. 8 people were killed, and 48 others were wounded, 21 critically.
July 1, 2008	Shanghai	China	6	4	10	Knife, Molotov Cocktails	Yang Jia ignited 8 molotov cocktails at the front gate of the police headquarters in Zhabei before stabbing a security guard and 9 police officers before he was subdued and arrested. He was subsequently sentenced to death.
February 19, 2016	Assin Akrofuoum, Central Region	Ghana	6	1	7	Machete	Akwasi Ganu killed his parents, his sister, his nephew, and his landlord with a machete, along with injuring the son of the landlord. He was killed by a mob after fleeing the scene.
July 10, 2023	Lianjiang, Guangdong	China	6	1	7	Knife	2023 Lianjiang stabbing: A 25-year-old man fatally stabbed 6 people, including 3 students, and injured one more with a knife at a kindergarten before being arrested.
March 6, 2024	Ottawa, Ontario	Canada	6	1	7	38 cm hunting knife	20-year-old Febrio De-Zoysa killed a mother, her 4 kids, and a family friend that he was living with in their townhome in Ottawa.
March 7, 1972	Cruzeta, Rio Grande do Norte	Brazil	6	0	6	Sickle	Farmer José Emidio da Silva hacked his wife and 5 children to death with a sickle, he would later be arrested and sentenced to 30 years in prison.
March 17, 1943	Karhiniemi, Huittinen	Finland	6	0	6	Axe	Toivo Koljonen, an escaped convict, broke into a home in the village of Karhiniemi, killing 5 family members and a visiting neighbor with an axe. He was then captured in Viranmaa nearly 2 weeks later and sentenced to death.
August 14, 2011	St Helier	Jersey	6	0	6	2 kitchen knives	Rzeszowski family homicides: 31-year-old Damian Rzeszowski stabbed 6 people, including 4 family members, to death before attempting via stabbing himself. Rzeszowski survived his attempt and was arrested shortly after, and sentenced to 180 years in prison, 30 for each victim.
March 31, 1922	Waidhofen, Bavaria	Germany	6	0	6	Mattock	Hinterkaifeck murders: Five members of the Gruber family, along with their maid, were found dead at their farm from stab wounds sustained by a mattock. The perpetrator has never been identified, and the case remains unsolved as of 2026.
August 20, 1960	San Carlos	Chile	6	0	6	Scythe	Jorge del Carmen Valenzuela Torres, later known as the Jackal of Nahueltoro, murdered his partner and five stepchildren with a scythe. He evaded capture for a month until being arrested and sentenced to death.
September 17, 2009	Collier County, Florida	United States	6	0	6	Fillet Knife	Mesac Damas fatally stabbed his wife and 5 children at their home in Collier County. The next day, he fled the country and flew to Port-au-Prince, Haiti. He was apprehended by US Marshals on September 23 and sent back to the US to be prosecuted.
October 23, 1889	Lovendegem	Belgium	5	24	29	Razor	A patient at a hospital for 'incurables' fatally stabbed 4 patients and the lady superior with a razor. 24 others were wounded.
May 27, 1846	Mumbai	India	5	17	22	Knife	A drunken man killed 5 people and wounded 17 more with a knife in the streets of Bombay before he was subdued.
October 20, 2008	Nonhyeon-dong, Seoul	South Korea	5	7	12	Sashimi knife, 2 fruit knives, Tear Gas Gun, Gasoline.	2008 Nonhyeon-dong gosiwon murders: 30-year-old Jeong Sang-jin set fire to his apartment with gasoline and slashed fleeing victims with a Sashimi knife, killing 6 people and injuring 7 others. One death was attributed to a fall. Jeong was sentenced to death on May 12, 2009.
August 29, 2017	Pasay, Metro Manila	Philippines	5	4	9	Kitchen Knife	Alberto Garan stabbed his girlfriend to death in his apartment, then went between other rooms stabbing other tenants before being shot dead by police.
October 13, 2021	Kongsberg	Norway	5	3	8	Two bladed weapons, Bow and arrow	Kongsberg attack: Espen Andersen Bråthen stabbed 5 people to death inside their homes and in public space and injured two others. Earlier, he attacked police officers and bystanders with a bow and arrow, but either discarded or lost the bow. He was arrested 35 minutes later and sentenced to psychiatric confinement in 2022.
August 2, 2018	Baýramaly, Ashgabat	Turkmenistan	5	2+	7+	Wrench, strangulation.	33-year-old Dovran Seyitberdyev killed 5 people and injured several others in his ex-wife's relatives and neighbors houses. He fled the scene but was later arrested at his home and sentenced to 25 years in prison.
December 22, 1986	Předměřice nad Labem, Hradec Králové District	Czechoslovakia	5	2	7	Knife, knife sharpening block.	33-year-old Vladimír Lulek, after returning drunk from a bar with an acquaintance, stabbed his wife and his four children to death and injured his acquaintance and neighbour, both of which attempted to intervene. He then attempted suicide by slashing himself but failed and was arrested. He was executed in 1989 as the last person executed in what is now the Czech Republic.
May 4, 2021	Saudades, Santa Catarina	Brazil	5	1	6	Katana, Fireworks	Saudades massacre: 18-year-old Fabiano Kipper Mai entered the Pro-Childhood Aquarela daycare center in downtown Saudades and killed 3 children and 2 staff members with a Katana before attempting suicide with the sword. He was then arrested and sentenced to 329 years in prison.
September 4, 1913	Degerloch, Württemberg	German Empire	5	0	5	blackjack, Dagger	Ernst August Wagner murdered his wife and four children in the early hours of September 4 with a dagger and a blackjack. Later that evening, Ernst killed 9 more and injured 11 others in a mass shooting in the village of Mühlhausen before being subdued by locals and arrested.
October 26, 2013	Brooklyn, New York	United States	5	0	5	Butcher Knife	Murder of the Zhuo family: Mingdong Chen murdered his cousin's wife and four children with a butcher knife in their home before being arrested at the scene.
October 10, 1977	San Juan	Trinidad and Tobago	5	0	5	Machete	A man running through the halls of El Socorro public school killed four children with a machete; while trying to escape, he killed a woman outside the school. He was later arrested by police.
May 21, 2014	Jiangzicui metro station, Taipei	Taiwan	4	24	28	2 fruit knives, Swiss Army Knife	2014 Taipei Metro attack: 21-year-old Cheng Chieh attacked passengers on a Taipei Metro C321 subway train, killing 4 and injuring 24 others. Chieh was arrested shortly after and was sentenced to death, being executed on May 10, 2016.
August 4, 2010	Zibo, Shandong	China	4	20	24	Long knife	26-year-old Fang Jiantang stabbed 24 students and staff with a knife at a Kindergarten, killing 3 students and 1 teacher. He was arrested shortly afterwards.
September 30, 2004	Linwu County, Hunan	China	4	16	20	Cleaver	Liu Hongwen, a former teacher at Guangyi Township Central Elementary School, stabbed students and teachers with a cleaver at the school before being arrested. He was found not guilty by reason of insanity.
January 23, 2009	Sint-Gillis-bij-Dendermonde, East Flanders	Belgium	4 (Note: 3 in the nursery, 1 in a home 1 week prior)	12	16	3 kitchen knives	Dendermonde nursery attack: Kim de Gelder killed an elderly woman in her home a week prior, then killed 2 children and 1 adult in a nursery and wounded 13 others before being arrested an hour later in Lebbeke.
June 8, 2008	Akihabara, Tokyo	Japan	4 (Note: Excludes victims killed by truck.)	8	12	Smith & Wesson HRT Dagger	Akihabara massacre: 25-year-old Tomohiro Katō rammed a rented truck into a crowd in the Akihabara shopping quarter, then exited the vehicle and stabbed bystanders. He was arrested shortly after.
July 8, 2021	Havana	Cuba	4	2	6	unknown	58-year-old Felix Ramón stabbed 4 of his neighbors to death in an apartment building before setting the apartment on fire and committing suicide by falling.
September 15–17, 2004	London and Sussex	United Kingdom	4	2	6	Large knives	Daniel Gonzalez fatally stabbed 4 people and injured 2 more across multiple homes between September 15 and the 17th, until he was arrested by police.
May 29, 1989	Springfield, New Jersey	United States	4	1	5	10-inch-Butcher knife	Rolando Marcelo would go on a stabbing spree killing his brother, mother, and two neighbors. He was found not guilty by reason of insanity.
February 22, 1999	Gulbene	Latvia	4	1	5	Cleaver, knife, axe	Gulbene kindergarten massacre: 19-year-old Alexander Koryakov entered a Gulbene kindergarten and hacked three girls to death with a meat cleaver. He also killed a teacher and wounded a nurse before trying to escape and being arrested.
September 12, 2026	Houma, Louisiana	United States	4	1	5	?	4 people were killed, and 1 child was injured after a stabbing spree across several homes in Houma. 47-year-old Kaegan Solet, who was charged with another stabbing incident in 2019, was arrested on September 13 in connection to the attack.
March 10, 2024	Mānoa, Hawaii	United States	4	0	4	Kitchen knife	Paris Oda, under financial distress, stabbed his wife and three children to death, before turning the blade on himself.
August 21, 1952	Saxtorp, Hurva	Sweden	4	0	4	Axe	Tore Hedin murdered his parents in Saxtorp with an axe and set their house on fire, then went to a retirement home in Hurva where his ex fiancée, Ulla Östberg, worked and lived. He bludgeoned Ostberg and Agnes Lundin, the matron of the retirement home, before setting the home on fire, killing 5 more residents.
November 13, 2022	Moscow, Idaho	United States	4	0	4	Ka-bar knife	2022 University of Idaho murders: 28-year-old Bryan Kohberger fatally stabbed 4 University of Idaho students in an off-campus house in Moscow, Idaho. Kohberger was arrested on December 30 at his parent's home in Chestnuthill Township, Pennsylvania. On July 25, 2025, Kohberger was sentenced to life in prison without the possibility of parole.
April 2, 2026	Kampala	Uganda	4	0	4	Machete, knives	Kampala school stabbing: Christopher Onyum fatally stabbed 4 children at the Ggaba Early Childhood Development Program School before being arrested.
May 22, 2013	Brno	Czech Republic	4	0	4	Knives, Axe	Harok family murder 20-year-old US national Kevin Dahlgren murdered the Harok family with knives and an axe before setting their remains on fire. He fled the Czech Republic and flew back to the United States, to which he was immediately arrested after landing in Washington DC on May 23, 2013.
September 21, 2012	Pingnan County, Guangxi	China	3	13	16	Knife	25-year-old Wu Yechang broke into a nursery and attacked children with a knife, killing 3 and leaving 13 others injured. He was arrested by police at the scene.
February 27, 2002	Yongtai County, Fujian	China	3	11	14	Knife	38-year-old Huang Qiaoying stabbed 14 students from Baidu Primary School while they were walking home from class. She was arrested and found not guilty due to her mental illness.
December 19, 2025	Taipei	Taiwan	3	11	14	Smoke grenades, Molotov Cocktails, Knife	2025 Taipei stabbings: 27-year-old Chang Wen threw smoke grenades and stabbed people across two locations in Taipei, Taiwan, killing 3 and injuring 11 others before committing suicide via fall.
July 29, 2024	Southport, Merseyside	United Kingdom	3	10	13	Kitchen knife	2024 Southport stabbings: 17-year-old Axel Rudakubana entered a Taylor Swift themed dance class and attacked various children and adults with a kitchen knife, killing 3 and wounding 10 others. Rudakubana was sentenced to life imprisonment on January 23, 2025.
October 22, 2019	Village Dudkino, New Moscow, Moscow	Russia	3	4	7	Knife	In the morning, Sergei Sazonov, a 26-year-old hostel employee, grabbed a knife and began attacking guests following a dispute that arose when they refused to lend him money (other accounts suggest it may have been an attempted robbery). A 20-year-old pregnant woman and a 47-year-old man were killed. The assailant also wounded himself while being apprehended and subsequently taken into custody.
February 11–12, 2011	New York City, New York	United States	3	4	7	Chef knife, carving fork, 2004 Lexus ES330	Maksim Gelman stabbing spree: Over the course of 28 hours, Maksim Gelman killed 4 people, including his stepfather, and injured 5 others with a knife and car until being subdued and arrested.
August 23, 2017	Nizhny Novgorod	Russia	3	2	5	Knife, Improvised explosive	Sergei Barakhov, an employee at Gorky Automobile plant (GAZ), stabbed 5 other employees, 3 fatally, before he was shot and wounded by police and subsequently arrested. While attempting to evade police, Barakhov threw an improvised explosive towards them.
October 22, 2015	Trollhättan	Sweden	3	2	5	Viking Sword	Trollhättan school attack: 21-year-old Anton Pettersson killed three people and injured 2 with a sword at Kronan Primary School before being shot dead by responding officers.
May 11, 2013	Milan, Lombardy	Italy	3	2	5	Pickaxe	21-year-old Mada "Adam" Kabobo, an illegal Ghanaian immigrant, attacked pedestrians with a pickaxe on the streets of Milan for 50 minutes before being arrested.
September 25, 2012	Zhengzhou	China	3	1	4	Knife	Around 5 AM, a 20-year-old man with the surname Zhang stabbed 4 students in a female dormitory at the Henan Vocational and Technical College following a dispute. He was arrested shortly afterwards.
March 6, 2024	Guadalajara, Jalisco	Mexico	3	1	4	Hatchet, 2 knives	Technological University of Guadalajara attack: 20-year-old Gabriel Alejandro Galaviz González murdered a woman in a hotel, then killed 2 more people at the Technological University of Guadalajara. He was arrested by police and committed suicide in August 2024 while in custody.
April 7, 2020	Knox County, Tennessee	United States	3	1	4	Knife	2020 Knox County stabbing: Idris Abdus-Salaam stabbed three women to death and injured another at a truck stop outside of Knoxville before being shot dead by a responding officer.
May 20, 1991	Porterville, California	United States	3	1	4	Hunting Knife	45-year-old Sypheuang Souvannasing, a former mental patient with a history of delusions, fatally stabbed 3 people at random and set one of the victims' homes on fire. He hid inside a trailer home and was shot dead by responding officers.
September 9, 1985	Davao City	Philippines	3 (Note: Excludes 64 victims killed by poisioning.)	0	3	Machete, Knife	Sinasa massacre: Religious leader Mangayanon Butaog gave his followers gruel laced with insecticide, killing 64 of them. When his wife and two children refused to eat the gruel, Butaog killed them with a machete, then stabbed himself in the abdomen with a knife, committing suicide.
August 1, 2026	São Bernardo do Campo, São Paulo	Brazil	3	0	3	Pocket knives	2026 Bombril factory stabbings: 33-year-old Claudio Henrique da Silva stabbed 3 coworkers to death before being arrested, he would later commit suicide while in prison.
May 23, 2014	Isla Vista, California	United States	3	0	3	SRK knife, hunting knife	2014 Isla Vista attacks: Elliot Rodger stabbed two of his roommates along with their friend to death prior to killing 3 more and injuring 14 others in a shooting/car ramming attack before killing himself.
April 1, 2000	Murcia	Spain	3	0	3	Katana, machete	16-year-old José Rabadán Pardo killed his parents and sister in their sleep with a katana and machete. He was arrested two days later in a train station and later sentenced to six years in a juvenile detention center.
June 5, 1931	RMS Empress of Canada	Pacific Ocean	2	29	31	Pocketknife	1931 Empress of Canada stabbings: Graciano Bilas, a passenger abord the Empress of Canada, stabbed 31 passengers before being arrested and brought to Hong Kong, where he was declared insane.
May 7, 2024	Zhenxiong, Yunnan	China	2	21	23	Knives	A man stabbed 23 people at Zhenxiong People's Hospital with two knives before being arrested.
May 28, 2019	Kawasaki City, Kanagawa	Japan	2	18	20	2 Yanagi ba knives	Kawasaki stabbings: 51-year-old Ryuichi Iwasaki stabbed 20 people at a bus stop in Kanagawa before stabbing himself in the throat, killing 2 people and himself.
April 28, 2021	Beiliu, Guangxi	China	2	16	18	Knife	A 25-year-old man stabbed 18 students and teachers at a kindergarten before being arrested. His ex-wife worked at the school.
August 1998	Henan	China	2	15	17	Unknown	A former teacher stabbed 17 students, 2 fatally, at a school in Henan.
December 13, 1933	Sasmuan	Philippines	2	12	16	Bolo	Dalmacio Bautista, who was recently released from an asylum, attacked people with a Bolo during a town fiesta until he was subdued by a bystander. After his arrest, Bautista claimed he acted in self defense, stating that he heard someone plotting to kill him.
May 20, 2024	Guixi, Jiangxi	China	2	10	12	Fruit Knife	A 45-year-old woman stabbed 12 students and teachers at a primary school before being arrested.
November 7, 2020	Krivoy Rog, Dnepropetrovsk Oblast	Ukraine	2	8	10	Kitchen knife	29-year-old man started stabbing random people on the streets of Metalurhiinyi District of the city. He stabbed 10 people, two of whom (father and son) were killed, before being apprehended. In February 2021 he was sent to compulsory psychiatric treatment.
April 4, 2020	Romans-sur-Isère, Drôme	France	2	5	7	Knife	2020 Romans-sur-Isère knife attack: Abdallah Ahmed-Osman stabbed 7 people in two shops, killing 2, before being arrested.
October 31, 2020	Quebec City	Canada	2	5	7	Katana	2020 Quebec City stabbing: Carl Girouard stabbed several people with a Katana near the Parliament Building before being arrested by police.
June 29, 2003	Irvine, California	United States	2	3	5	Samurai Sword	30-year-old Joseph Parker, a former employee with a history of delusions, killed 2 people and injured 3 more with a sword at Albertson's Supermarket before he was shot dead by responding officers.
February 11, 2019	Stolbtsy, Minsk region	Belarus	2	2	4	Knife	15-year-old student Vadim Miloshevsky fatally stabbed a student and teacher and injured 2 other students at School No. 2 before fleeing the scene and being arrested 2 hours later.
March 28, 2023	Lisbon	Portugal	2	1	3	Knife	2023 Lisbon Ismaili Centre stabbing: Abdul Bashir stabbed 3 people, two fatally, at the Ismaili Muslim Centre until being shot by responding officers and arrested.
September 29, 2026	Staškov	Slovakia	2	1	3	Knife	A 13-year-old student stabbed 2 teachers and a female student at an Elementary school in Staškov. He was arrested by police shortly after. The female student died in the hospital days later.
January 16, 2025	Spišská Stará Ves	Slovakia	2	1	3	Tactical knife	2025 Spišská school stabbing: 18-year-old student Samuel Straško fatally stabbed the assistant principal and an 18-year-old female student at a gymnasium injuring another student before fleeing the scene and being arrested in a florest an hour later.
May 26, 2017	Portland, Oregon	United States	2	1	3	Knife	2017 Portland train attack: Jeremy Joseph Christian stabbed three people on a train for intervening as he was harassing other passengers before being arrested by police.
December 14, 2012	Wenshu Township, Henan	China	1	23	24	Kitchen knife	Chenpeng Village Primary School stabbing: 36-year-old Min Yongjun stabbed an elderly woman in her home before stealing a knife and stabbing 23 children at Chenpeng Village Primary School. He was subsequently arrested.
July 16, 2009	Ncabaneni	(Eswatini) Swaziland	1	10	11	Spear, stones	Three boys and eight girls were stabbed with a spear by Sicelo Dlamini at classrooms in Ncabaneni High School, who was then chased and beaten to death by a mob of outraged students. Besides Dlamini, one of the wounded girls died at the scene.
June 30, 2018	Boise, Idaho	United States	1	8	9	Knife	2018 Boise stabbing: 30-year-old Timothy Kinner carried out a mass stabbing at an apartment complex in Boise, Idaho, United States. One child was killed.
March 21, 1950	Avellino	Italy	1	8	9	Knife	23-year-old Mario Gurino fatally stabbed a girl and wounded 8 others during a church congregation. He was disarmed outside the church afterwards.
December 20, 2024	Zagreb	Croatia	1	6	7	Knife	Zagreb school stabbing: 19-year-old Leonardo Mušančić stabbed 7 students and staff at Prečko Elementary School, resulting in the death of a 7-year-old student, before attempting to take his own life. He was arrested shortly after.
June 20, 2026	Krasnodar	Russia	1	6	7	Machete	2026 Krasnodar mall attack: A 19-year-old man attacked shoppers with a machete at a shopping mall in Krasnodar, Russia before being arrested.
June 11, 2020	Vrútky, Žilina Region	Slovakia	1	6	7	Knife	Vrútky school stabbing: 22-year-old former student Ivan Čulok stabbed students and staff at United School (Spojená škola), killing the school's deputy principal and injuring 6 others. He was then shot dead by police while fleeing the scene.
August 3, 2016	London	United Kingdom	1	5	6	Knife	2016 Russell Square stabbing: Zakaria Bulhan stabbed 6 people at Russell Square, killing 64-year-old American, Darlene Horton and injuring 5 others. He was tased by police and arrested at the scene.
October 14, 2014	Žďár nad Sázavou	Czech Republic	1	4+	5+	Combat knife replica, pepper spray	Žďár nad Sázavou school stabbing: 26-year old Barbora Orlová attacked a secondary school in Žďár nad Sázavou, stabbing 1 student to death and injuring several other students before taking one of the injured as a hostage. Orlová was neutralized with a taser and arrested shortly after injuring a police negotiator, who exchanged himself with the injured hostage.
April 30, 2024	Hainault, London	United Kingdom	1	4	5	Katana	2024 Hainault sword attack: Marcus Monzo crashed his van into a property, then stabbed bystanders with a Samurai Sword. A 14-year-old boy, Daniel Anjorin, was killed, and four others were injured, including two police officers. Monzo was tased by responding officers and arrested.
April 27, 2026	Calama	Chile	1	4	5	Katana, several knives, pepper spray	2026 Calama school stabbing: An 18-year-old student allegedly attached multiple students and staff members at his high school, killing a regional inspector and injuring four others before being tackled and disarmed. He attempted to commit suicide by stabbing before being arrested.
January 23, 2023	Algeciras, Andalusia	Spain	1	4	5	Machete	2023 Algeciras church attacks: 25-year-old Yassine Kanjaa attacked 2 churches in Algeciras, stabbing 4 people until being arrested.
August 21, 2026	Fagersta	Sweden	1	3	4	Longsword	2026 Fagersta school stabbing: An 18-year-old man wearing a helmet and face mask attacked students at the Brinell school in Fagersta before being arrested by police.
April 24, 2025	Nantes	France	1	3	4	Hunting knife, folding knife	2025 Nantes school stabbing: A 14-year-old student stabbed four classmates at his school, killing one girl before being restrained by a teacher and arrested.
October 1, 2026	Torreón	Mexico	1	3	4	Machetes, Molotov Cocktails, Firecrackers	2026 Torreón school stabbing: Two 18-year-old twin brothers and former students carried out an attack on Secondary School Number 13 in La Unión ejido in Torreón, killing an assistant principal and injured 3 others. They were subdued by bystanders and taken into custody by police afterwards.
October 8, 2016	Minsk	(Belarus) Belorussia	1	2	3	Chainsaw and axe	ru:Казакевич, Владислав Валентинович: 17-year-old Vladislav Kazakevich killed 1 woman and wounded 2 others at a shopping mall in Minsk before being detained by mall staff and authorities. In 2017 he was sentenced to 15 years imprisonment, in 2018 the term was increased to 22 years since Kazakevich committed another attack in prison.
June 6, 2020	Cangwu, Guangxi	China	0	39	39	Knife	2020 Cangwu county stabbing: Security guard Li Xiaowen stabbed 37 kids and two adults at Wangfu Primary School with a knife. He was sentenced to death and, as of 2026, is awaiting execution.
September 16, 2011	Arroyo	Puerto Rico	0	37	37	Needle	A 14-year-old girl stabbed 37 students with a hypodermic needle at Escuela Intermedia José D. Choudens in Arroyo, Puerto Rico.
May 26, 2006	Berlin	Germany	0	37	37	Kitchen knife	16-year-old Mike P. slashed a crowd during an inauguration at Berlin Central Station with a 7.5-inch knife before being subdued by security guards and arrested. In 2007, he was charged and sentenced to seven years in prison.
April 29, 2010	Taixing, Jiangsu	China	0	32	32	Knife	Zhongxin stabbing: 47-year-old Xu Yuyuan went to Zhongxin Kindergarten and stabbed 29 students and two teachers after stabbing the security guard. He was sentenced to death on May 15 and executed on May 30.
September 11, 2004	Suzhou, Jiangsu	China	0	28	28	Knife	Suzhou daycare stabbing: 41-year-old Yang Guozhu stabbed 28 kids at a daycare in Suzhou with a knife. He attempted to light gasoline and explosives in the building, but was stopped by police and arrested.
January 20, 1995	Mount Pleasant, Pennsylvania	United States	0	28	28	Needle	A 13-year-old boy stabbed 19 to 28 classmates with a hypodermic needle at Mount Pleasant Area Secondary School before being arrested.
September 20, 2004	Ju County, Shandong	China	0	25	25	Kitchen knife	Ju County stabbing: 36-year-old Jia Qingyou stabbed 25 students at a primary school and held a female student hostage for one hour before being subdued by authorities. He was sentenced to death and executed one month later.
September 14, 1998	Hejiang County, Sichuan	China	0	23	23	Kitchen Knives	A man stabbed 23 children at an elementary school flag-raising ceremony before being subdued by a teacher and getting arrested.
December 27, 2001	Surigao City	Philippines	0	22	22	Bolo	60-year-old fisherman Dalmacio Abad hacked people sleeping on the ground and second floor of a ferry terminal with a Bolo. He resisted arrest but was subdued by more than a dozen security guards and police officers.
April 9, 2014	Murrysville, Pennsylvania	United States	0	21	21	Two kitchen knives	Franklin Regional High School stabbing: 16-year-old Alexander Hribal stabbed 20 students and a security guard at Franklin Regional High School before being restrained by the assistant principal and another student.
September 30, 2014	Daqing, Heilongjiang	China	0	20	20	Knife	43-year-old Li Huaqiang stabbed 14 diners at a KFC outlet and six more at a McDonald's restaurant before being arrested at the scene. He was later sentenced to death on January 16, 2015.
April 1, 2007	Lijiang, Yunnan	China	0	20	20	Knife	25-year-old tour guide Xu Mingchao, stole a knife from a store, stabbed the store owner and then attacked tourists and pedestrians at a resort and square until he was arrested. In 2008, he was sentenced to 15 years in prison.
December 26, 1925	Toulon	France	0	20	20	Knives	Two sailors attacked guests at a dance hall with knives, injuring 20. One suspect was captured while the other escaped.
May 23, 2025	Hamburg	Germany	0	15	15	Knife	2025 Hamburg stabbing attack: 39-year-old Lydia S. stabbed 15 people in the Central train station of Hamburg before being subdued by bystanders and arrested.
December 8, 1994	Birmingham, West Midlands	United Kingdom	0	15	15	Knives	Rackhams knife attack: 30-year-old David Morgan injured fifteen women at a Rackhams store before being restrained and arrested by police.
January 4, 1997	Taichung County	Taiwan	0	14	14	Two knives	30-year-old Franco Salomon stabbed 9 workers at a glass factory before attempting suicide by stabbing himself. When the police arrived, he resisted arrest, stabbing five officers before he was subdued.
February 2, 2001	Red Lion, Pennsylvania	United States	0	14	14	Machete	2001 Red Lion machete attack: 55-year-old William Michael Stankewicz attacked students and faculty at North Hopewell-Winterstown Elementary School with a machete before being subdued by the principal and arrested. He was sentenced to a minimum of 132 years in prison.
January 15, 2018	Perm	Russia	0	13	13	Knives	2018 Perm school stabbing: Two 16-year-old students attacked students and teachers with knives at School #127 in Perm before attempting to take their own lives.
June 17, 1991	Olongapo, Zambales	Philippines	0	13	13	Machete	30-year-old Evaristo Malisya attacked people with a machete at an evacuation center, following the eruption of Mount Pinatubo, wounding 13 before escaping.
July 26, 2025	Garfield Township, Michigan	United States	0	11	11	Folding knife	2025 Traverse City stabbing attack: 42-year-old Bradford James Gille is accused of 11 people at a Walmart before he was restrained and arrested by police.
November 1, 2025	Huntingdon, Cambridgeshire	United Kingdom	0	11	11	Knife	2025 Cambridgeshire train stabbing: 32-year-old Anthony Williams is accused of stabbing 11 passengers aboard a London North Eastern Railway train before being restrained and arrested by police.
September 3, 1998	Hajdúhadház	Hungary	0	11	11	unknown	A 31-year-old female teacher stabbed eight children and three teachers in the canteen of a primary school in Hajdúhadház.
December 27, 2025	Mishima, Shizuoka	Japan	0	8	8	Knife, bleach	Mishima factory stabbings: 38-year-old Masaki Oyama is accused of injuring fifteen former coworkers at a rubber factory, stabbing eight of them.
December 8, 1901	Kiel	German Empire	0	8 (Note: Initial reports stated the victim count as 80. However, a later report published the number as 8.)	8	Knife	A man stabbed 8 people along the street with a knife in Kiel before fleeing.
October 22, 2017	Flums, St. Gallen	Switzerland	0	7	7	Hatchet, scissor	17-year-old Sasha I. set his home alight before going on a one-hour stabbing spree across his town, injuring 7 people before being shot and arrested at a gas station.
March 3, 2021	Vetlanda, Småland	Sweden	0	7	7	Axe	2021 Vetlanda attack: 22-year-old Tamim Sultani stabbed 7 pedestrians with an axe in Vetlanda. He was shot and wounded by police before being arrested.
August 21, 2019	Charqueadas, Rio Grande do Sul	Brazil	0	7	7	Hatchet, Molotov cocktails	A 17-year-old teen, inspired by the Suzano massacre, threw a Molotov cocktail at a classrom, which failed to detonate. Alarmed by the loud noise, students began to run and he attacked them with a hatchet, injuring six students and a teacher before another teacher was able to subdue him.
January 19, 2018	Sosnovy Bor, Buryatia	Russia	0	6	6	Axe, molotov cocktail	15-year-old student Anton Bichivin attacked 5 students and a teacher with an axe and a molotov cocktail at School #5 before attempting to take his own life by stabbing himself and jumping out of a window.
September 17, 2024	Azambuja	Portugal	0	6	6	Knife	2024 Azambuja school stabbing: A 12-year-old boy stabbed six people at a school.
August 12, 2024	Eskişehir	Turkey	0	5	5	Camping knife	2024 Eskişehir stabbing: 18-year-old Arda Küçükyetim stabbed people outside a mosque and in the surrounding area while livestreaming the attack on Kick. He was then chased and subdued by a police officer. In September 2025, he was sentenced to 75 years and five months imprisonment. He committed suicide in June 2026, while in custody.
September 28, 2023	Jerez de la Frontera, Andalucía	Spain	0	5	5	Knives	2023 Jerez de la Frontera school stabbing: 14-year-old Saúl stabbed 3 teachers and 2 students with a pair of knives at the Elena García Armada Institute, a school in Jerez de la Frontera. He was arrested on the third floor of the building.
November 23, 2023	Leinster, Dublin	(Republic of Ireland) Ireland	0	4	4	Knife	Gaelscoil Choláiste Mhuire stabbings: Riad Bouchaker, an Algerian immigrant, attacked a group young children outside a primary school with a 10-inch knife, stabbing a five-year-old girl, a care assistant and two other children. Passersby were able to disarm and incapacitate him until his arrest.
May 10, 2021	Dunedin	New Zealand	0	4	4	Knives	2021 Dunedin supermarket stabbing: Four people were stabbed at a market in central Dunedin. The attacker, 42-year-old Luke James Lambert, was arrested shortly after and later sentenced to 13 years imprisonment in May 2022.
May 21, 2024	Taichung	Taiwan	0	3	3	Knives	2024 Taichung MRT attack: 20-year-old Hung Ching stabbed 2 people on a Taichung MRT train before being subdued by passengers. The attacks occurred exactly 10 years after the 2014 Taipei Metro attack.
