= List of mass stabbing incidents =

List of mass stabbing incidents may refer to the following lists:

- List of mass stabbing incidents (before 2010)
- List of mass stabbing incidents (2010–2019)
- List of mass stabbing incidents (2020–present)
- List of mass stabbings by death toll
