= Khazz silk =

Type of silk cloth

Khazz silk (al-khazz الخزّ ) was a blended silk cloth made of silk and wool. Persian and Arabic qazz or khazz, refer to silk or silk products. In medieval Arabic القزّ al-qazz meant "raw silk". Khazz appears in written documents at various points in history with variable meanings, though almost always associated with silk materials. Khazz was also pronounced as qazz in colloquial Arabic.

== Origins and meaning ==
Khazz silk can refer to both raw silk and a variety of silken cloths. The name of the silkworms in Arabic is dudat al-qazz and sericulture and silk weaving have a long history as vital industries in Syria and Palestine.

The meaning of the word has shifted over time, and was once used to describe the "waste silk" made in the process of sericulture, or the scraps of old silk cloths. Though silk-weaving flourished in Palestine beginning in the 2nd century, domestic sericulture did not begin until centuries later, so raw silk was imported or old silk fabrics disassembled to spin new yarn, often mixing the thread with more readily available yarns to make new silk blends.

Khazz is only one of the words to describe silk fabrics in Arabic, and when used in tandem with harir in historical documents, the latter would mean silk, referring to silk filament & fabrics woven from it, as contrasted against khazz spun silk fabrics, which may have been brushed to be downy. Khazz could be of superior quality or low quality, and the lower quality materials had other names like khazzaj, khazash and khashaz

Khazz was also used to describe a cloth of blended wool (in some cases rabbit wool) and silk, and was also used historically to describe the beaver and its hide. This latter usage (in both Arabic and Greek) engendered much confusion among modern scholars of Byzantine Greek, where the Greek cognate of khazz, chasdion (χάσδιον) appears frequently in old texts & well into the 15th century.

== History of use ==
The earliest documented mention of khazz is in a panegyric poem by the Arab poet Al-Nabigha where he describes it as a red silk fabric in which the Ghassanid king Amr is adorned. Silk manufacture and trade were an important source of revenues for the Byzantine Empire. The Ghassanids served as foederati during the time of Roman Byzantine rule over Palestine and Syria, and secured the trade routes, including the end of the Silk Road.

Khazz was one of several polychrome silks mentioned in writings on the time of early Caliphate, the others being harir, dibaj and washy (this latter being an embroidered silk fabric). Ibn Sa'd and Ibn Hanbal, both writing in the 9th century, recount that Uthman the first caliph and Imran bin Husain wore clothing made of khazz, and the latter with the explicit approval of the prophet Muhammed.

There are several mentions in Arabic literature to a type of striped khazz and Kutuf (the velvet cloth) used at the Umayyad Caliphate court, Hisham ibn Abd al-Malik (691-743). Hisham used to have a fondness for robes and carpets." …. In his days there were made, striped silk (al-khazz raqm) and velvets (kutuf)".

In the Middle Ages, a variety of fabrics that used silk for the warp and wool for weft would be called khazz.

A particular type of coarse silk fabric mixed with wool and produced in Palestine was called qazz and bi-harir (meaning "in/of silk"), and a thin, almost transparent version of it was used in clothing, drapery and even as medical dressings. Exported from Gaza city's port to various destinations in Europe, it also came to be known as qazz or gauze or gaza there.

A cloth called khazz is mentioned in the 13th century and in a 16th-century document of Ain-i-Akbari.

== Texture ==
The texture of Khazz was similar to velvet or a napped cloth.

== Price ==
Khazz is noted as one of the costlier cloths, and it was priced at 16 Tankahs/silver coins (equal to the monthly salary of a soldier in the 14th century). The price is almost 16 times corresponding to a long cloth which was 1 Tankah.

== See also ==
- Katan (cloth)
