= Shengshui Temple kindergarten attack =

2010 mass stabbing in Shaanxi province, China

- Location: Nanzheng County, Hanzhong, Shaanxi, China
- Date: 12 May 2010; ~8:00 a.m. (CST)
- Target: Children and teachers at a private kindergarten
- Attack type: Mass stabbing
- Weapon: Cleaver
- Deaths: 10 (including the perpetrator)
- Injuries: 11
- Perpetrator: Wu Huanming
- Motive: Personal grievance, mental instability

The Shengshui Temple kindergarten attack was a mass stabbing that occurred on 12 May 2010, at a private kindergarten near Shengshui Temple in Nanzheng County, Hanzhong, Shaanxi province, China. The attacker, 48-year-old Wu Huanming, killed nine people—seven children and two adults—and injured eleven others with a cleaver before taking his own life.

The incident was one of a series of school attacks in China during 2010, prompting nationwide concern and renewed government measures to improve security at educational institutions.

== Background ==
The attack occurred during a period in 2010 when a string of violent incidents targeted schools across China. Authorities had been increasing security at educational institutions following similar events in provinces such as Guangdong and Shandong.

== Attack ==
On the morning of 12 May 2010, 48-year-old Wu Huanming entered the Shengshui Temple Kindergarten armed with a cleaver. He attacked students and teachers, killing seven children and two adults before returning home and committing suicide by cutting his own throat.

== Suspect ==
Wu Huanming, a 48-year-old local man, was described by neighbors as a reclusive and short-tempered farmer. Reports indicated that he had recently had a dispute with the owner of the kindergarten over the property's lease. According to The Guardian, Wu had taken in a disabled boy he found on the streets, suggesting that he was not entirely isolated within his community. However, Shanghai Daily reported that Wu suffered from chronic physical illnesses, including diabetes and prostate inflammation, which may have contributed to his psychological distress.

== Aftermath ==
Following the incident, Chinese authorities ordered tighter security at schools and kindergartens nationwide. Local officials also pledged to provide counseling for survivors and families of victims. The attack drew widespread condemnation and further intensified discussions about mental health care and social inequality in rural China.

== See also ==
- Nanping school massacre
- List of mass stabbings by death toll
