= 1987 Banyuwangi massacre =

Mass stabbing in East Java, Indonesia

- Location: Banyuwangi Regency, East Java, Indonesia
- Date: 15 April 1987
- Attack type: Mass murder, mass stabbing, murder–suicide
- Weapon: Jombret
- Deaths: 21 (including the perpetrator)
- Injuries: 12
- Perpetrator: Wirjo

On 15 April 1987, a mass stabbing took place in two villages in Banyuwangi Regency, Indonesia. Twenty people were killed and twelve others were injured before the perpetrator, Wirjo, committed suicide during a manhunt.

== Murders ==
The first attack took place in the morning hours at Wirjo's home in Banjarsari, part of Glagah, Banyuwangi. At the back of the house, Wirjo was sharpening a jombret, a Javanese grass-cutting tool, while in the front of the residence, Wirjo's four-year-old adopted daughter Renny was playing in a sand dune with another girl of the same age, Arbaiyah. After a while, Wirjo, who had periodically come from behind the house to check on the children, suddenly ran at them wielding the jombret. Renny avoided the first swing of the weapon, after which Wirjo attacked Arbaiyah, killing her by slashing her throat, nearly decapitating the girl. Renny was able to flee the scene through a rice field, where she found her adoptive mother (Wirjo's wife) and told her what happened. The mother and child returned to confront Wirjo, who just stared at them and walked away. The pair went off to report the incident to authorities. Security forces in nearby Kemiren were informed at approximately 6:30 a.m.

Wirjo went to the next-door home of Maskur and his wife Mursiyah. Entering through the back of the house, Wirjo snuck up on Mursiyah as she was cooking rice in the kitchen and slashed her throat from behind. Maskur heard the attack from the living room and attempted to intervene, but he was also fatally struck in the neck. By this point, other neighbours had become aware of Wirjo's attacks and fled their homes, informing other residents of the ongoing murders. As a result, several other villagers came to the scene to look for Wirjo. The search party briefly found and chased after Wirjo after Gimin, a villager who survived an attack without injury, alerted them to his presence. The group lost sight of Wirjo as he fled west into the rice fields, near the Galung river, where they discovered the body of Isah, who was killed with the jombret as she was trimming the fields. The group spotted Wirjo walking in the distance and went in his direction, finding two dead elderly people, Suwendah and Taman, in the fields. Like the previous victims, they had died from cuts to the neck. The group subsequently stopped the search effort to bring the bodies back to the village. They found nine additional corpses in the rice fields, all farmers who were killed while working. According to uninjured survivor Aniya, who was a relative to Wirjo, he chased after anyone he encountered in the rice fields, but easily lost interest to instead attack others who were close. The first casualties were brought to the hospital at about 9:00 a.m.

Wirjo eventually left the fields and entered Boyolangu, part of Giri. On the path near the embankment, he fatally slashed the throat of Istianah, a Sekolah Menengah Pertama student at Kosgoro Middle School, as the girl was walking the opposite direction. Wirjo was spotted by residents, led by rukun tetangga head Temu, and chased into the residential area. Wirjo escaped the group, but was confronted in the backyard of Djam'i, a People's Security (Kamra) militaman. Although the two men knew each other, Wirjo did not respond to questions and attacked Djam'i, who, as a trained silat fighter, was able to fend off the attack with several kicks, although losing two fingers while blocking a blow from Wirjo's weapon. Djam'i ran to alert other security forces, while Wirjo fled further into the village. The final victim was Suindah Rasmani, who was slashed in the back of the neck while harvesting coconuts and died on the way to the hospital. Wirjo was last seen by the remaining coconut gatherers, walking near a river between the hamlets of Delik and Gerangan.

=== Security response ===
During the killings, militia security forces ordered the evacuation of Banjarsari and Boyolangu. Those who elected to stay were asked to gather in groups of ten families at the residence of a neighbour or relative, with the women and children to barricade themselves inside while the men guarded the house with sharpened bamboo sticks, clubs and machetes. Schools in the area were closed for the day, but reopened the next morning.

Police had difficulty arriving at the scene as they did not know the exact location and were unaware of Wirjo's appearance. They thus had to contact his uncle, Sutedjo, to guide them to Wirjo's house, remaining with Sutedjo for most of the day. Backup only arrived after Wirjo had already disappeared from Boyolangu. The manhunt began in the evening and was led by Indonesian National Police Major General Subagyo, in the forests of Banyuwangi. Police made use of search dogs and were also aided by the Indonesian National Armed Forces. The following day, at around 10:00, Besuki Regional Police Chief Colonel Momo Kelana and his troop found Wirjo's body between the hamlets of Concrong and Jatibesar, around 3 kilometres (2 mi) west of his house. He had committed suicide by hanging with a cloth belt, reported as either a setagen or kain, which he had tied around the roots of a tree, positioned on a cliff 2.5 metres (8.2 ft) above the Siwuran river. Rather than collect Wirjo's body for burial, the officers shot the makeshift noose and let the body get swept away by the currents, with many villagers gathering to watch around the stream for the body, which was eventually retrieved.

== Victims ==
By the end of the day, Wirjo had attacked a total of 32 people, 19 in Banjarsari and 13 in Boyolangu. Approximately 37 people were admitted to the emergency department (UGD), with 15 or 17 declared dead during the day; the remainder were reportedly stabilised. By the following day, the death toll had increased to 18. Two weeks after the murders, Tempo reported 20 fatalities, 18 of whom were dead at the scene while two others died of their wounds at the hospital. Immediate reports claimed at least 14 injured, but this number was later reduced to 12. Most of the victims were farmers on their way to the rice fields or children on their way to school.

All casualties were treated at Blambangan Regional Hospital (RSUD Blamangan) in Banyuwangi town. Due to the remote location of the villages, many of the victims were transported with pick-up trucks or motorcycles. All of the fatalities were slashed in the neck, although wounds were often present all over the body, head, and limbs. Blambangan hospital was overwhelmed with the number of casualties, leading to scheduled surgeries being cancelled and requiring some patients having to lie on mats on the floor. Additional medical staff had to be called from the mountains, as there weren't enough doctors even as the intern nurses substituted for them, with some officers of the national police and army soldiers aiding as well. Emergency treatment was over at 13:00, four hours after the first arrivals, though some of the injured were still at the hospital as of 25 April.

An officer of the Banyuwangi Regency Government Community Protection took photographs of the ongoing treatment at the hospital and later of Wirjo's body as it was discovered the day after the murders. The photos, numbering around 36, were then gifted to Balambangan Hospital head surgeon Suherman as historical mementos. Suherman elected to keep most of the images private.

The fatalities included the following:

- Arbaiyah, 4
- Mursiyah, 43
- Maskur, 80
- Isah, 40
- Taman, 75
- Suwendah, 73
- Buang, 50
- Sumo, 65
- Rohayah, 50
- Sueb, 50
- Samirah, 40
- Supijah, 45
- Asri, 60
- Aasmui, 55
- Asmai, 28
- Istianah, 15
- Suindah Rasmani

== Perpetrator ==
Suwirjo, better known as Wirjo, was born as the fifth of nine children, as a member of the local Osing. He received elementary schooling, which was not standard for the rural area. Wirjo was formerly employed at Kertas Basuki Rachmat Indonesia, a paper company in Jakarta, working as a forklift operator, but was fired after intentionally ramming a forklift into a wall, subsequently working on his brother's rice fields. On 1 July 1976, he married his wife Indarah. Besides the adopted Renny, the couple had no children. At the time of the murders, Wirjo was 42 years old and his wife was 32, although later accounts estimate his age as around 35 or 38.

=== Motive search ===
According to Indarah, unlike his siblings, who were also farmers, her husband had a reputation for being self-centered, arrogant and bad-tempered, being known for drinking a lot of alcohol, gambling frequently and "playing around" with other women. Due to this, his family questioned whether he would remain included in their mother's inheritance. Wirjo's family had been fairly wealthy, but Wirjo became poor after wasting his father's inheritance through his gambling and drinking habits, which resulted in frequent arguments with other family members. Indarah stated that Wirjo reacted violently when his personal issues were mentioned, threatening her with a celurit. He had made similar death threats against his mother and siblings, having once attempted to attack his mother with a keris. The night before the murders, Indarah and Wirjo got into a quarrel on the rice fields, after Wirjo told Indarah, who was hoeing the soil, to move so he could pass by with cattle. When she told him there was enough room, Wirjo beat her with a cattle whip, causing her to leave to go live at her parents' house in Kemiren.

Police mentioned that while they did not have a motive, they ruled out terrorism, which was initially considered due to the 1987 Indonesian legislative election on 23 April, also noting Wirjo that was suspected of being mentally ill before. Wirjo's uncle Sutedjo claimed that his nephew had sharpened the jombret used in the attacks two days earlier, telling him that he did so "for self-protection", but also believed that the massacre was not premeditated and instead committed because Wirjo thought his wife had left him, not knowing she intended to return eventually. Modern media reports attribute the murders to Wirjo's bad character traits and inability to control his emotions.

== Aftermath ==
When the discovery of Wirjo's body was first announced, Sukar, a hansip in nearby Kemiren and the son of the killed woman Suindah, believed that Wirjo had been found alive and set out to challenge him in a one-to-one machete fight. He was intercepted along the way by other villagers and informed of Wirjo's death by suicide.

Over the following days, police distributed flyers around Banyuwangi to ensure everyone was aware of Wirjo's death. After a post-mortem examination at Blambangan Hospital's morgue, the remains were returned to Wirjo's family. Local custom required that bodies are washed by hand before burial, but the man in charge of the duty, Mudin, refused out of superstitious fears. Wirjo's uncle Sudetjo did the rites instead and with seven gravediggers, he buried Wirjo in the family plot, next to his father. The funeral being watched by thousands of locals, who described still feeling fearful, to the point that they had difficulty eating and sleeping, but were still curious about Wirjo's nature.

In August 2017, as part of the 30-year anniversary of the killings, Banyuwangi Radio made a retrospective report on the massacre. Due to the passage of time, several details, such as the exact date in 1987 when the killings occurred or the exact number of fatalities and injured, were not immediately available to local media and had to be reconstructed through contemporary witnesses and archived records. Wirjo's uncle and the hospital head surgeon at the time were interviewed and the death site was visited. Interest in the murders resurged in the early 2020s with the rising popularity of true crime, after the case was featured in the television news magazine On the Spot, which included testimony by survivors, local officials and relatives of Wirjo. Ahead of the 35-year anniversary, security guard Sukar was interviewed.

== Myths and misinformation ==
Wirjo was already known as an eccentric in the village. Besides his irritable temperament, his uncle Sutedjo and food vendors in Perliman remembered Wirjo for his large and unusual appetite. In one instance, he ate 5 kilograms (11 lb) of fried rice by himself, bathing in the river afterwards. Another time, he made rujak from two papayas and 2 kilograms (4.4 lb) of chili, but refused ice to get rid of the lingering spicy aftertaste after, instead eating fifty boiled eggs with the same purpose. These eating habits, contributed to Wirjo's pre-existing reputation as someone inhuman. Once, Wirjo tranquilized a cow, which he considered too weak during plowing, by feeding the cow a red-tailed green ratsnake before slaughter.

Local rumours from before the murders also claimed that Wirjo had developed supernatural powers through kanuragan, a Javanese form of ritualistic magic, due to which it was believed that Wirjo was immune to being cut, able to dematerialize or go invisible and capable of bilocation. Before his marriage, Wirjo had engaged in a two-year tirakat, a tariqa-derived form of asceticism, claiming he had spent this time without sleeping and learnt magic spells. A popular rumour in the area claimed that Wirjo had been possessed by a spirit during the killings, while his family believed that his lack of spiritual guidance during his explorations of magic resulted in mental instability. Continued belief in Wirjo's supposed supernatural powers led to the massacre becoming the subject of urban legends. Because of this, his grave is often visited by locals, as well as tourists from across East Java. His death site, which has become less isolated due to the expansion of the surrounding rice fields, but is still only accessible by foot, is regarded as haunted by some Banjasari inhabitants, believing any visitor will be haunted by Wirjo's spirit. Rumours claim that fish gather under the spot where Wirjo hanged himself.

Bernama and Reuters reported that Wirjo had fasted for a month (specified as forty days by Indonesian media) before the murders and shortly before the attacks, he had supposedly dug up the remains of his mother in Banjarsari's graveyard and gnawed at the bones, despite her still being alive at the time of the murders. This was derived from a more mundane occurrence a month earlier, where Wirjo had reburied his father's body and shroud in a different part of the cemetery, an experience that apparently left him feeling uneasy and caused him to go to his mother's home to cry. Other early false reports claimed that Wirjo had decapitated a schoolboy, also killed his wife and his adopted son, despite Renny being female, and that he drank the blood of the latter. This particular claim is believed to stem from Wirjo's know preference for eating dried cow's blood. It was also widely misreported that Wirjo used a celurit (translated as a sickle in English-language reports), a knife, or even both weapons in the form of a parang and celurit. Local media specified that he used only a jombret, which resembles a parang but with a thinner and longer blade and, unlike a sickle, only the upper part of the blade is slightly curved.

== See also ==
- List of mass stabbings by death toll
- 1998 East Java ninja scare
