= Enoch Brown school massacre =

1764 massacre in Pennsylvania, United States

Coordinates: 39.8246°N 77.7559°W

- Part of Pontiac's War
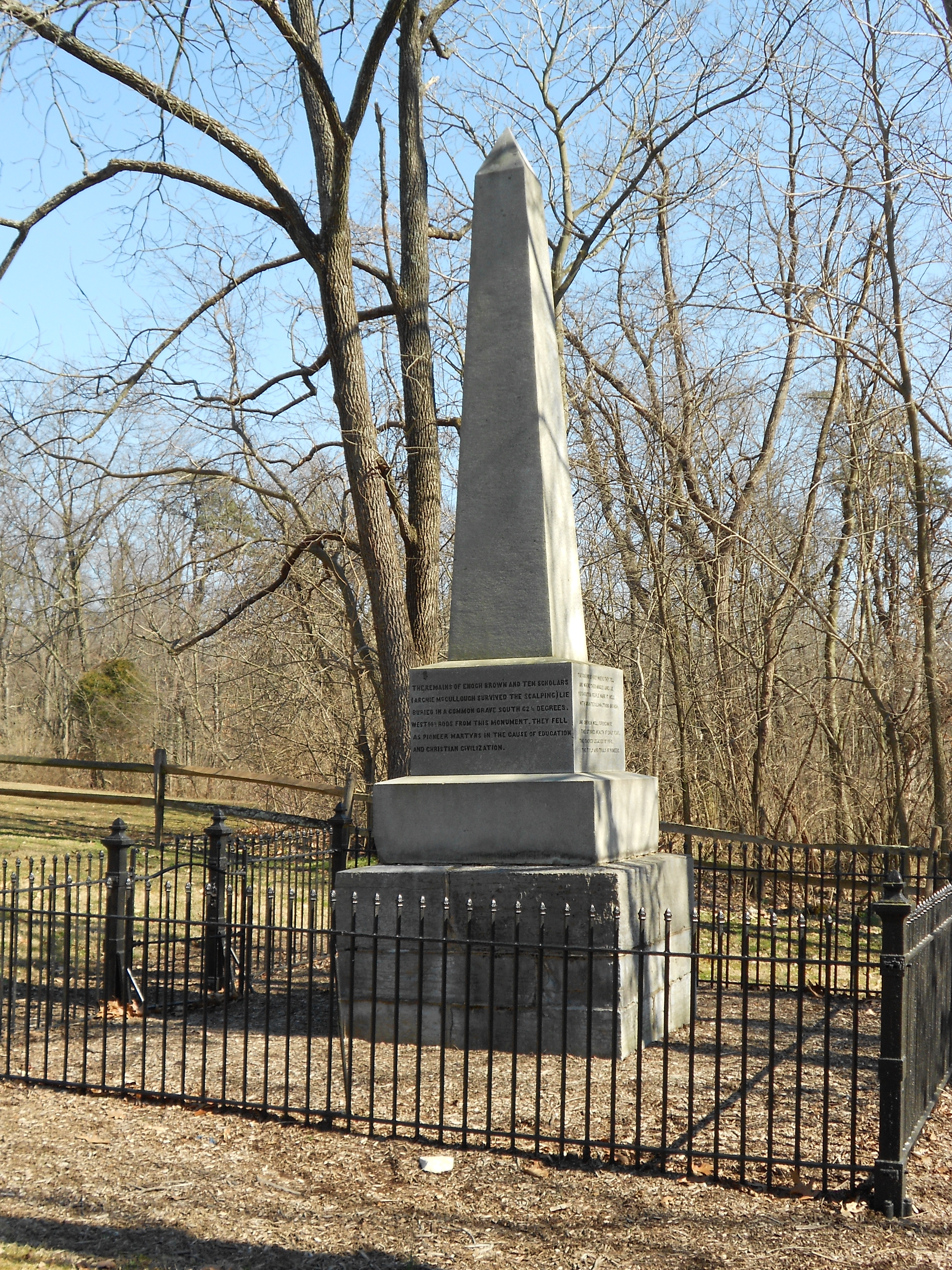
- Memorial erected in 1885, near Greencastle, Pennsylvania
- Location: Greencastle, Pennsylvania, British America
- Date: July 26, 1764; 262 years ago
- Target: Students and staff at Enoch Brown school
- Attack type: Massacre
- Deaths: 11
- Injuries: 1
- Perpetrator: 4 Delaware Lenape warriors

On July 26, 1764, four Delaware (Lenape) Native Americans entered a settlers' log schoolhouse in the Province of Pennsylvania and killed the schoolmaster, Enoch Brown, and ten students. One other student named Archie McCullough was wounded. Historian Richard Middleton described the massacre as "one of the most notorious incidents" of Pontiac's War.

== Attack ==
On July 26, 1764, four Delaware (Lenape) Native Americans entered a settlers' log schoolhouse in the Province of Pennsylvania in what is now Franklin County, near the present-day city of Greencastle. Inside were the schoolmaster, Enoch Brown, and a number of young students. Brown pleaded with the warriors to spare the children; nonetheless, he was shot, beaten with a club and scalped, and warriors then clubbed and scalped the children. Brown and ten children were killed. One scalped child, Archie McCullough, survived his wounds.

A child survivor recounted "Two old Indians and a young Indian rushed up to the door soon after the opening of the morning session. The master, surmising their objective, prayed them only to take his life and spare the children, but all were brutally knocked in the head with an Indian maul and scalped."

A day earlier, the warriors had encountered a pregnant woman, identified as Susan King Cunningham, on the road. She was beaten to death, scalped, and the baby was cut out of her body. When the warriors returned to their village on the Muskingum River in the Ohio Country and showed the scalps, an elder Delaware chief rebuked them as cowards for attacking children. John McCullough, a settler who had been held prisoner by the Delaware since 1756, later described the return of the raiding party in his captivity narrative:

I saw the Indians when they returned home with the scalps; some of the old Indians were very much displeased at them for killing so many children, especially Neep-paugh'-whese, or Night Walker, an old chief, or half king,—he ascribed it to cowardice, which was the greatest affront he could offer them.

== Aftermath ==
The authorities captured some of the Lenape warriors who were believed to be responsible for the massacre. The Lenape warriors were later sentenced to death and executed by hanging for their role in the massacre. Incidents such as these prompted the Pennsylvania General Assembly, with the approval of Governor John Penn, to reintroduce the scalp bounty system previously used during the French and Indian War. Settlers could collect $134 for the scalp of an enemy American Indian male above the age of ten; the bounty for women was set at $50.

Settlers buried Enoch Brown and the schoolchildren in a common grave. In 1843, the grave was excavated to confirm the location of the bodies. In 1885, the area was named Enoch Brown Park and a memorial was erected over the gravesite.

== See also ==
- List of school shootings in the United States by death toll
- List of school shootings in the United States (before 2000)
- List of school shootings in the United States (2000–present)
- List of mass stabbings by death toll

== Bibliography ==
- Dixon, David (2005). Never Come to Peace Again: Pontiac's Uprising and the Fate of the British Empire in North America. Norman: University of Oklahoma Press. ISBN 0-8061-3656-1.
- Middleton, Richard (2007). Pontiac's War: Its Causes, Course, and Consequences. New York: Routledge. ISBN 978-0-415-97914-6.
- McCulloh, Rodney (2015). The Scalping of Archie McCullough:The True Story of the Sole Survivor of the Enoch Brown Massacre. Lagoda, IN: Lamp-post Books. ISBN 978-1-329-67680-0.
