= 2023 Lianjiang stabbing =

2023 mass stabbing in China

- Location: Hengshan Town, Lianjiang, Zhanjiang, Guangdong, China
- Date: July 10, 2023 c. 7:40 a.m. – c. 8:00 a.m. (CST; UTC+08:00)
- Target: Kindergarten
- Attack type: Mass stabbing; mass murder; child murder
- Weapon: Knife
- Deaths: 6
- Injuries: 1
- Perpetrator: Wu Moujie
- Motive: Unknown

On July 10, 2023, a mass stabbing occurred at a kindergarten in Hengshan, Lianjiang, Zhanjiang, Guangdong, China. A 25-year-old man, Wu Moujie, stabbed seven people, killing six.

== Background ==
There have been attacks on schools using cold weapons in China. Knife attacks are common because it is very difficult to get firearms in China.

== Stabbing ==
The attack happened at around 7:40 a.m., just as parents were dropping their children off for summer classes. Wu Moujie entered the kindergarten and started stabbing people. The attacker was detained at around 8:00 a.m.

A video spread on the internet showing victims lying on the ground near the kindergarten gates.

=== Victims ===
Among those killed are one teacher, two parents, and three students. One other person was injured.

== Aftermath ==
The attack caused anger online. By the end of July 10, more than 400 million people had read about the incident on the Chinese social network Weibo. Many demanded that the attacker be sentenced to death.

== Perpetrator ==
The perpetrator was Wu Moujie, who was 25 years old at the time of the incident. He was a resident of Lianjiang.

One witness said that earlier, the attacker's child had been hit by a car driven by one of the victims at the kindergarten.

Later, the perpetrator said he acted out of revenge after being harassed by a student from the same kindergarten.

== See also ==
- List of school attacks in China
- List of attacks related to primary schools
- List of mass stabbings by death toll
- List of mass stabbing incidents (2020–present)
- 2023 in China
