= 2026 Bombril factory stabbings =

2026 workplace stabbing in São Paulo, Brazil

Bombril factory stabbings
- Location: São Bernardo do Campo, São Paulo, Brazil
- Date: August 1, 2026; 3 months ago c. 05:50 a.m. (BRT, UTC−03:00)
- Target: Coworkers
- Attack type: Mass stabbing; Workplace stabbing; Triple murder
- Weapon: Two Pocket knives
- Deaths: 4 (including the perpetrator) (Note: The perpetrator died by suicide ten minutes after being incarcerated.)
- Perpetrator: Claudio Henrique da Silva
- Defender: Edvaldo Santos da Silva
- Motive: Under investigation, possible Retaliation for workplace bullying, psychotic break

On the morning of August 1, 2026, 33-year-old forklift operator Claudio Henrique da Silva stabbed 3 coworkers to death inside the Bombril factory in São Bernardo do Campo, São Paulo, Brazil, before being subdued and arrested. He would later commit suicide while in prison.

== Events ==
On the morning of August 1, 2026, 33-year-old Claudio Henrique da Silva, a forklift operator for TPC took two pocket knives to his workplace at the Bombril factory in São Bernardo do Campo, shortly after arriving, Claudio pulled out his pocket knives and begun stabbing 39-year-old Douglas de Souza Vieira, Witnesses first thought they were fistfighting before seeing Douglas bleed. 44-year-old supervisor Edvaldo Santos da Silva tried to intervene, firstly by trying to calm Claudio down, then by throwing a chair at him, before being fatally stabbed to death on the left side of the chest. Douglas tried to flee by running down a flight of stairs but fell before heading to safety, causing Claudio to catch up to him and stab him to death, all while repeating "go mess with someone who was quiet" (Vai mexer com quem está quieto) and "are you playing with me?" (Vai tirar brincadeira comigo?). After killing both workers, Claudio stabbed 54-year-old José Guilherme Victoriano de Moura to death near a bathroom and continued to stab the other three until he lost his breath, at which point he sat down on the ground and was subdued by other workers, still holding one of the knives, saying he was only going to hand it over to police, when the police came Claudio threw the knife on the ground and surrendered. Claudio would later kill himself 10 minutes after being incarcerated.

== Aftermath ==
Bombril released a note later that day stating that Claudio was a third party worker that had suffered a psychotic break inside the factory, as well as sharing solidarity with the victims family, TPC, the third-party company hired by Bombril which both the perpetrator and the victims were employed by took full accountability over the act.
All three victims were buried the following day.

The factory returned to operation on August 3, with 18 psychologists and social workers helping the employees.

== Victims ==
- Douglas de Souza Vieira, 39-year-old; Worked as a forklift operator, died at the factory.
- José Guilherme Victoriano de Moura, 54-Year-Old; Worked as a product inspector, died at the factory.
- Edvaldo Santos da Silva, 44-year-old; Worked as a supervisor, rescued alive but succumbed to his wounds.

Two of the victims, José Guilherme Victoriano de Moura and Douglas de Souza Vieira are alleged to have bullied the perpetrator over his "bad smell".

== Perpetrator ==
The perpetrator was identified as 33-year-old forklift operator Claudio Henrique da Silva who worked as an outsourced employee in the factory for around two years. Claudio was knows as a quiet and timid person who didn't have much social interaction with his family, he lived with his parents but didn't share much of his daily life with them, he was known to enjoy practicing sports. Claudio was on his day off during the attack and was known to be bullied inside the factory.
Claudio had no known criminal record, with his only police document being related to a traffic accident where he was listed as the victim.

== See also ==
Mishima factory stabbings - Similar workplace attack in Japan
