= Tonghua murders =

2006 spree killing in Jilin, China

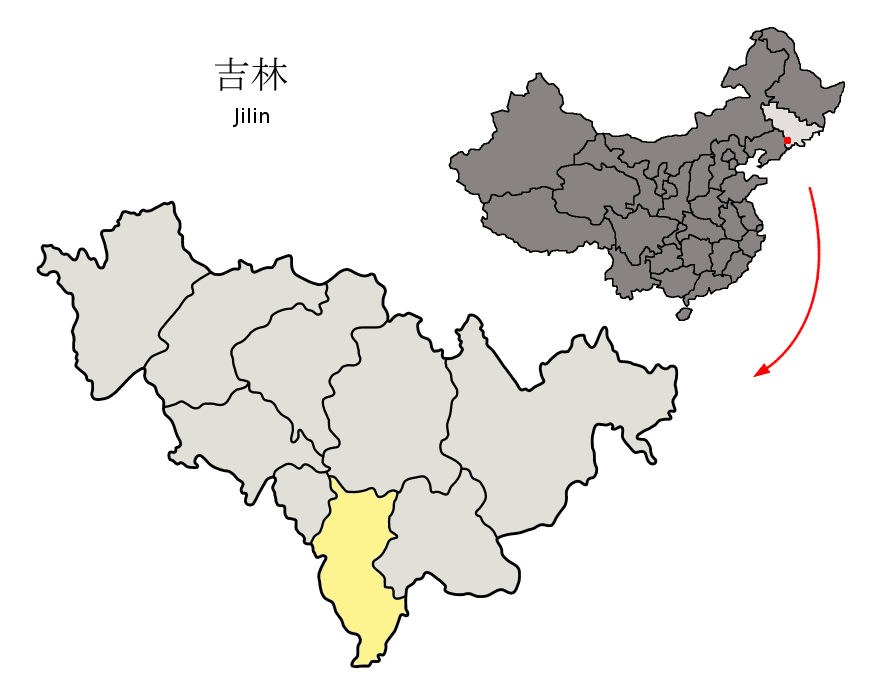
- Location of Tonghua in Jilin
- Location: Liuhe County and Tonghua County, Jilin, China
- Date: 24–29 September 2006 c. 0:00 – 12:00 (CST)
- Attack type: Mass stabbing
- Weapon: Knife
- Deaths: 12
- Injuries: 5
- Perpetrator: Shi Yuejun
- Motive: Revenge for perceived humiliation Witness eliminiation
- Convictions: Murder x12 Robbery x1

Between 24 September and 29 September 2006, twelve people were killed and five were wounded others in a series of knife attacks in Tonghua, Jilin, China. The killings are collectively referred to as the Tonghua 9·24 mass murder case (Chinese: 通化9·24特大系列杀人案).

The perpetrator, 35-year-old Shi Yuejun, was apprehended following a manhunt and admitted to the murders, saying he was motivated by vengeance for previous conflicts with the victims. He was sentenced to death on 25 November the same year and executed a month later.

== Murders ==
=== Initial spree killing ===
On the evening of 23 September 2006, at approximately 21:00, Shi, armed with four knives, drove his work truck to Ermi, seeking out fellow pig farmer and butcher Li Zhenjun, who ran Ermi's slaughterhouse. Shi found Li at the town bar and after an argument, the two men spent the evening playing cards and drinking baijiu with two fellow butchers. Shi then convinced the three men to enter his truck for a ride home. Shi dropped off the other two butchers without incident before pulling up to Li's residence. Outside the house, Shi stabbed Li to death, loaded his body onto the truck and drove to Tongmei Road near Dalianchuan village, just outside of Ermi, to dump the remains.

Returning to Ermi, Shi bought rat poison, apparently for use in a potential suicide. At about 1:30 a.m., he went to the house of Wang Yuliang, the deputy director of Ermi's animal husbandry site, who had fined Shi for failing to abide by livestock quarantine regulations. Shi coaxed Wang Yuliang into opening the door by claiming he was there to pay the fine, then attacked Wang and his family inside. Shi fatally stabbed Wang, his wife Zhang Lili and Wang's parents. Wang Yuliang's brother, Wang Yuhong, intervened by attacking Shi with a shovel, sustaining a stab wound to the abdomen. During the fight, Shi was injured in the leg, fleeing after one of his knives broke. Wang Yuhong briefly chased after Shi's car before walking to house of the Tang couple across the street, telling them to call the police. Wang Yuliang and his father were found dead on the floor, while his mother was lying on a kang bed-stove with the still living Zhang, as well as the couple's three-year-old son. Zhang died before the arrival of an ambulance.

Shi then drove back to Tonggou, where he sought out shop owner Liu Guohua, who had refused to sell his meat, at his store across the street from Shi's house. Pretending he was there to buy food, Shi killed Liu after he opened the door before rushing into the living quarters and attacking Liu's wife, Cao Deqin, in the bedroom. She was stabbed 37 times in the chest, back, and arms, but survived, albeit rendered paralysed. Shi then went down a few streets to the house of Wang Gang, who had refused to slaughter pigs for Shi because he offered low compensation. Shi was let inside by claiming he was there to deliver a pig, after which Shi seriously injured Wang with a single stab wound to the abdomen.

Via Tongliu Highway, Shi proceeded to Zhudayuan Village in nearby Sanyuanpu town, to the house of shop owner and slaughterhouse supervisor Yu Hongyong, described as Shi's only childhood friend, who had also imposed of a fine on Shi. Claiming he needed to borrow money from Yu, Shi ambushed Yu while distracted, stabbing him several times in the abdomen. Yu's resistance caused Shi to injure his hand and drop the knife. Shi took out another knife and lightly injured Yu's wife by slashing her in the face. Before dying, Yu told his wife to hide in a room with a lock bolt. Shi left his truck at the village entrance and fled the scene on foot.

=== Manhunt ===
Less than an hour after the Wang family killings were reported, Shi was identified by police as the culprit through descriptions by his fellow villagers. At 3:30, roadblocks were set up in Liuhe and Tonghua County, as well as Tonghua City and Meihekou. A reward of ¥100,000 was offered by Tonghua Public Security Bureau for clues about the murderer's whereabouts.

On 27 September, at around 6:00 a.m., while hiding in the mountainside near Tonggou, Shi went to the secluded home of Sun Honglian and Liu Jifen to ask for food. However, fearing they would report him to police, Shi killed them before fleeing again. After a crime scene analysis tied the murders to Shi, the public security bureaus of Tonghua, Baishan, and Liaoyuan decided to enter a joint investigation, deploying 2,000 police officers from their respective city bureaus, as well as 1,000 officers of the Jilin People's Armed Police. Police determined that Shi was still in the area On 28 September, the Ministry of Public Security issued a Class-A warrant and offered a reward of ¥50,000 for information that would lead to his arrest. 12,000 people participated in the manhunt including armed police, militia, and local residents.

On 29 September, at around 3:00, Shi broke into the house of Zhao Yufu in Lüjiabao Village, part of Liunan Township. Shi was discovered at 5:30 by the homeowner, after which Shi killed Zhao and his wife Guan Xiumei inside the home before fatally stabbing their grandson Zhao Jinkai inside the building's courtyard. A neighbour, Liu Jinping, overheard the commotion and fought Shi using a wooden drawbar. Liu was cut in the left arm while Shi retreated after being bludgeoned. Liu went to the town doctor's house and reported the incident to police at 5:50 and at a few hours later at around 12:00, Shi was apprehended in a cornfield outside the village.

== Victims ==
=== 24 September ===
==== Killed ====
- Li Zhenjun (李振军)
- Wang Yuliang (王玉良), 34
- Zhang Lili (张莉莉), 26, Wang Yuliang's wife
- Wang Guilu (王贵禄), 79, Wang Yuliang's father
- Li Xiumei (李秀梅), 72, Wang Yuliang's mother
- Liu Guohua (刘国华), 43
- Yu Hongyong (于宏勇), 35

==== Injured ====
- Wang Yuhong (王玉宏), Wang Yuliang's brother
- Cao Deqin (曹德芹), 43, Liu Guohua's wife
- Wang Gang (王刚)
- Xie Hongyan (谢红艳), Yu Hongyong's wife

=== 27 September ===
- Sun Honglian (孙洪连), 45
- Liu Jifen (刘继芬), Sun Honglian's wife

=== 29 September ===
==== Killed ====
- Zhao Yufu (赵玉福)
- Guan Xiumei (管秀梅), Zhao Yufu's wife
- Zhao Jinkai (赵金凯), 14, Zhao Yufu's grandson

==== Injured ====
- Liu Jinping (刘金平), 49

== Perpetrator ==
Undated photo of Shi used in the manhunt

Shi Yuejun (Chinese: 石悦军; pinyin: Shí Yuèjūn) was born on 5 March 1971 in Liunan, a township of Liuhe County, the youngest of four children to pig farmers residing in Tonggou village. His father died when Shi was four years old, for which he was bullied by other children. In 1988, after completing basic schooling, Shi adopted the family trade of raising pigs, home slaughtering them and selling the meat as a self-employed butcher at farmer's markets in Tonggou and surrounding communities, most part of Liunan township, rotating the locations each day. He was regularly contacted with businesses in nearby Ermi town.

Shi was well-liked in his hometown and nicknamed "Little Shi" ("小石子") by fellow villagers. His neighbours regarded him as quiet and solely business-minded, though willing to haggle for every individual cut of pork by weight. He wasn't known to start arguments and once willingly offered to give up his usual stand when a fellow farmer argued with him for it. Conversely, Shi's mother suspected that her son had a mental illness and stated that he was known for his stinginess. Shi married sometime in the early 1990s, having a 14-year-old daughter and a three-year-old son by 2006. Shi's wife worked as a teacher and together, they had a relatively large income. However, Shi had been experiencing financial difficulties since 2005. His wife described Shi as an introverted person with few social contacts who was prone to rumination and holding grudges over past conflicts with others. The families of the later victims related that Shi's relationships with them was tenuous, and according to Shi's family, he had voiced his belief that he was the target of a deliberate humiliation effort since July 2006. The family of Liu Guohua recalled several incidents in which Shi threw stones at their house after Liu refused to buy meat from him after receiving a bad batch.

According to police, Shi was diagnosed with depression. Two months prior to the murders, his sister organised regular appointments with a psychiatrist in Tonghua, which improved his mood, and he and his wife spent ¥10,000 to make trips to Shanghai, Suzhou, and Hangzhou.

== Investigation ==
Following his capture, Shi was brought to Changchun, where he confessed to the murders. He admitted to having planned the murder of 12 people since May 2006, telling police he had intended to kill the remaining five targeted people. Shi described his motive as "revenge for the humiliations that he suffered by the society". Shi claimed that the first victim, Li Zhenjun, had been making unfair monetary charges to other butchers since May 2006. Police later found that he was referring to a relatively recent government-mandated change in the management of the Ermi slaughterhouse, which had introduced a required health check for animals before slaughter. Shi had refused to pay for the check-ups and continued to slaughter pigs at his own house for later sale at the market to circumvent this, which was subsequently discovered by Li, who fined Shi ¥1,000, beginning Shi's feud with the slaughterhouse. Cheng Songliu, a sociologist at Changsha University of Science and Technology, stated that Shi was significantly affected by past childhood trauma and his ongoing depression, and following failings in his personal life and career, Shi projected his pre-existing delusions of persecution onto the slaughterhouse, its staff and finally anyone who had previously quarrelled with him.

== Trial ==
Shi was tried at Tonghua Intermediate People's Court on 25 November 2006. There was increased security in the court house, with required ID checks and a ban on carrying bags into the building. Shi's state-appointed attorney argued for a lighter sentence, pointing to his client's lack of a prior criminal history and willingness to cooperate in custody.

Shi pleaded guilty, but reasoned that he "didn't kill without reason" and was "forced into a desperate situation". Shi claimed that he didn't plan the murders in advance and had only come to Li Zhenjun's property to kill one of his pigs. According to Shi, Li caught him in the act and thinking Li was armed as well, Shi killed Li. Shi then decided to kill other people who had wronged him, believing that he would get the death penalty for Li's murder anyway. He did acknowledge that the final five victims were complete strangers and only killed because he believed they could report him. He also downplayed his previous admission of having plans to kill more people and was unable to name exact reasons why they needed to die in his mind. The son of two of the victims, Sun Changli, grabbed a brass desk sign to throw at Shi when the latter stated he was "forced" to kill his parents. Sun was stopped by bailiffs and escorted out of the room along with another son of victims, Zhao Chunxiang, who had tried to lunge at Shi with Sun. Shi remained mostly still-faced, except when addressing the media attention by saying he did not consider himself a serial killer or mass murderer, receiving a warning for contempt of court for smiling. Shi ended his statement by admitting he deserved to die and asked for the death penalty to be enforced before the end of the year, saying "Murder must be paid with one's life; debts must be repaid". Shi refused to pay compensation, however, claiming he had no money. Shi's wife and mother were subsequently escorted out of the court.

At the end of the three-hour trial, Shi was convicted of murder and robbery, for which was given a death sentence and ordered to pay ¥831,681.39 as compensation to the six co-plaintiffs in the case. Shi did not appeal the verdict.

=== Execution ===
For a little over three weeks, Shi was held at Liuhe County Detention Center. On 19 December, a day before his scheduled execution, he had a final visitation with his family, urging his mother and sister to not cry. He appeared calm, but reportedly ate little for dinner and had insomnia during his last night. In the morning of 20 December, he received a final meal of dumplings before being driven to the Liuhe County Court, where Tonghua Intermediate People's Court read him the execution warrant at 9:00. Shi showed no emotion, but frequently looked around. At 9:50, he was escorted to his execution site, held on a hill near Liuhe County's funeral home, where local residents, mostly families of victims, were in attendance. Shi Yuejun was executed at 10:00 with a single burst of gunfire.

== Aftermath ==
Deputy Secretary of the Provincial Party Committee Tang Xiangqian described the killings as an "extremely rare and one of the most heinous crimes in Jilin".

The government of Jilin allocated ¥1,000,000 to reward several participants in the manhunt. The Engineering and Chemical Defense Company of the Special Operations Brigade of the First Detachment of the Jilin Provincial Armed Police Corps was awarded a collective second-class merit along with a medal, with one officer, Wang Zhengchao, receiving an individual merit and medal. Five additional individuals received the same awards: Secretary of the Tonghua Municipal Party Committee Gao Guangbin, Mayor of Tonghua Zhang Anshun, Deputy Directors of the Jilin Provincial Public Security Department Li Dongtai and Shi Li, and Deputy Commander of the Jilin Provincial Armed Police Corps Chen Tianrang. Nine members of the Municipal Party Committee of Liuhe County and Tonghua County as well as 28 officers of eight units of the Provincial Public Security Department received third-class merits. Liu Jinping, who fought off Shi and alerted police who captured him, was awarded ¥5,000 and the title "Advanced Individual in Righteous and Courageous Acts of Jilin Province". Liu additionally received several thousand yuan in donations by various villagers in Liuhe County for his medical treatment.

While most voiced satisfaction at Shi's execution, some surviving victims voiced sadness for Shi's family. Cao Deqin, who was left paralysed and unable to pay her new medical expenses, said she didn't care about Shi's death and was more concerned over how the imposed fine would be paid. Tonghua's court noted that it is set to ensure the livelihood of Shi's family, who elected to move from their home village for the future of Shi's children, but that it could not guarantee that the agreed compensation will actually be the settled amount for each victim and their families.
