= 2003 Huludao murders =

2003 mass murder in Huludao, China

- Guo Zhongmin
- Location: Gaoheshanggou, Huludao, Liaoning, China
- Date: 18 February 2003; 15:00 – 16:00 (CST)
- Attack type: Mass stabbing, beating, home invasion,
- Weapons: Kitchen knife Wooden stick
- Deaths: 13
- Perpetrator: Guo Zhongmin

On 18 February 2003, a mass murder occurred in Gaoheshanggou village in Huludao, Liaoning, China. The occupants of three houses were targeted in a mixed stabbing and bludgeoning attack, killing 13 people.

The perpetrator, 36-year-old Guo Zhongmin, had acted out of vengeance after being sued by one of his neighbours following a land dispute. Guo went on the run for five days and died by suicide after being surrounded by police.

== Background ==
Guo Zhongmin (Chinese: 郭忠民) (24 June 1966 - 23 February 2003), a resident of Gaoheshanggou, part of Yangjiao Township in Huludao's Lianshan district, was embroiled in a zoning dispute with Zhang Baohua, over the latter's construction of a vegetable greenhouse. Zhang filed a lawsuit against Guo, which was decided in Zhang's favour. Guo reportedly harbored a grudge and came to believe that two other neighbours, Liu Changrui and Guo Zhongren, had supported Zhang in court.

== Incident ==
On 18 February 2003, Guo sent his wife and children away in preparation of the attack. In the afternoon, Guo entered successively the homes of his neighbours, armed with a kitchen knife and a wooden stick. Eight people were killed at the Liu residence, three people at the Guo residence and two people at the Zhang residence. Most victims bore signs of both bludgeoning and stabbing, having died either from head trauma or stab wounds to the head and torso. The attack lasted approximately an hour. Guo escaped the scene with a bleeding cut to his left hand.

== Victims ==
- Liu Changrui (刘长瑞), 62
- Liu Changyu (刘长玉), 59, wife of Liu Changrui
- Liu Yumei (刘玉梅), 39, daughter of Liu Changrui
- Liu Meng (刘猛), 24, daughter of Liu Changrui
- Grandson of Liu Changrui, 12
- Granddaughter of Liu Changrui, 5
- Nephew of Liu Changrui
- Niece of Liu Changrui
- Guo Zhongren (郭忠仁), Guo's cousin
- Wife of Guo Zhongren
- Son of Guo Zhongren
- Zhang Baohua (张宝华)
- Li Guoren (李国仁), Zhang Baohua's brother-in-law

== Manhunt ==
The same day as the attack, Huludao Municipal Public Security Bureau formed an investigative committee, around 30 minutes after the crime was reported. Officers were dispatched to protect the remaining families of the victims, particularly the wife and children of Zhang Baohua. Police issued a Class A arrest warrant for Guo's capture and provided photos and a physical description of Guo to public channels for broadcast on television and radio, reprint in newspapers, and word of mouth. Security checks were arranged at bus stations, railway stations, and travel agencies in all six of Huludao's districts/counties. More than 1,000 police officers of Liaoning Provincial Public Security Bureau were involved in the manhunt.

For four days, Guo travelled around Lianshan district by foot. On the evening of 19 February, Guo was first reported in a clinic in Beidi village near Gangtun, where he received a bandage for his hand. On 20 February, Guo received some food after begging at a house in Beigou village. In the early morning of 21 February, Guo broke into a home in Yangjiao Township, where he received food, a change of clothes and 30 yuan after threatening to kill the family of the homeowner. On the evening of 22 February, Guo went to a pesticide store run by an acquaintance in Huludao. After unsuccessfully begging for money, Huo stole a bottle of pesticide from the store and a bicycle outside before fleeing the city. Huludao police presumed that he would head for the province border to Hebei and alerted the public security bureaus in Anshan and Jinzhou.

On 23 February, Guo was spotted at the train station of Shahe Town in Suizhong County. As police moved in to arrest Guo, he swallowed the poisonous pesticide on his person and died at the scene despite resuscitation attempts.
