= Julian Marcelino =

1932 Seattle mass murderer

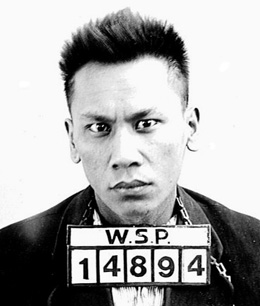
- 1933 image of Julian Marcelino at Washington State Penitentiary
- Born: Marcelino Julian; 1902; Cuyapo, Nuevo Ecija Province, Philippines
- Died: Unknown
- Occupation: Migratory worker
- Motive: Being robbed, insanity
- Conviction: Murder
- Penalty: Life in prison, later declared insane, paroled and deported

Details
- Date: November 24, 1932; 4:00 p.m. – 4:30 p.m.
- Locations: Seattle, Washington
- Target: Passersby
- Killed: 6
- Injured: 13
- Weapon: Bolo knife

Julian Marcelino (born 1902) was a Filipino mass murderer who killed six people and injured thirteen in a mass stabbing in Seattle's Chinatown district on November 24, 1932. Marcelino stabbed multiple people with a bolo knife before surrendering to the police.

== Background ==
Marcelino was born about 1902 in Cuyapo, Nueva Ecija province, in the Philippine Islands. He served for several years in the Philippine Constabulary and emigrated to the United States in 1929, arriving in Seattle aboard the SS President Grant. In the U.S. he worked at seasonal and migrant jobs, including as a cook and agricultural laborer.

== 1932 rampage ==
On Thanksgiving Day, November 24, 1932, Marcelino attacked residents and passersby in and around the Midway Hotel and along 6th Avenue South and King Street in Seattle’s International District with a bolo knife. Contemporary press accounts described a brief spree during which Marcelino killed six men and wounded thirteen, with Marcelino having been described as fighting like "a mad wolf". Marcelino had said he felt funny in the head. Four of those dead were Filipinos; the injured came from many ethnic backgrounds.

Those killed were

- Bernardino Bonita, 30
- Tito Guatlo, 36
- Jimmy Jiminez, 26
- Frank Johnson, 60
- William J. Morris, 65
- William Tenador, 26

Those injured were

- Cristolo Bayada, 19
- Mrs. Maca Fujita, 37
- S. Higashi, 38
- Kaneki Inyoue, 47
- I. Katimuri, 35
- K. Nakano, 48
- Yoshio Oya, 52
- Antone Schuele, 73
- Hans Sjogren, 56
- Harold Stallworth, 48
- Robert Sinclair, 47
- Thomas Takoff, 47
- K. Yasuda, 50

== Arrest and imprisonment ==
Marcelino surrendered to pursuing officers after about a half hour of attacks. He was held without bail and examined by psychiatrists. In April 1933 he was tried in King County Superior Court; the jury found him guilty of first-degree murder and he was sentenced to life imprisonment. After several years in Washington State Penitentiary in Walla Walla, he was transferred to a psychiatric hospital, declared legally insane, and under a conditional pardon tied to deportation, returned to the Philippine Islands in March 1936 for commitment to an institution.

== Later life ==
After being deported to the Philippines, some later accounts claim he served in resistance or military activity during World War II, reportedly surviving the Bataan Death March in 1942, but details after his deportation are sparse, and Marcelino's whereabouts after his departure from the United States. His ultimate fate is unknown.
