= Kitale murders =

1929 killing in Kitale District, Kenya

- Kitale (Kenya)
- Location: Kitale District, Kenya Colony
- Date: 12 May 1929
- Attack type: Mass stabbing
- Weapon: Spear
- Deaths: 12
- Injuries: 1
- Perpetrator: Mogo
- Motive: Anger over witchcraft allegations
- Convictions: Murder

On 12 May 1929, a mass murder occurred at a farm near Kitale, Kenya Colony. A native worker killed twelve people and wounded another with a spear. The perpetrator was subsequently arrested and sentenced to death.

== Background ==
In British-controlled African colonies, European settlers used the term "amok" to describe sudden and unexplained violence committed by natives. The term was applied when the perpetrators were previously well-regarded by Europeans as "intelligent, honest [and] industrious", and in employ as farm workers or askaris. Unlike its modern definition, amok was described as a "lust which has baffled white science to explain; for it is not due to disease, nor criminal instinct", and seen as a temporary state of mind occurring in individuals who showed no mental abnormalities either before or after committing "amok" violence.

The perpetrator, Mogo s/o Chesubol, was a Sebei originally from Uganda. He was married and had multiple children. For six years, he had worked as a resident labourer, or "squatter", on a farm about six miles from Kitale, owned by a European surnamed Weller. As part of the arrangement, Mogo was given a plot of land on Weller's property, where he lived in a hut with his family and tended to his own crops and livestock, in exchange for general labour in Weller's service.

Mogo became subject of rumours levied by other native squatters, claiming that he practiced witchcraft and based on this, Weller decided to not renew Mogo's contract. On 11 May 1929, Weller told Mogo that he had to leave because of the black magic allegations, after which Mogo reportedly returned to his hut and spent the next day brooding over the development.

== Incident ==
During the midday or afternoon hours of 12 May 1929, Mogo began shouting in his hut before grabbing a spear he kept on a rack above his front door, using it to kill his wife Kasenwa and their infant Tarokwa with a slashing motion. Afterwards, Mogo ran out of his home towards the hut of a man with whom he had previously quarrelled, broke down the door and stabbed the resident to death. Another resident overheard the attack and attempted to restrain Mogo from behind, but he was stabbed and seriously injured. Mogo then headed towards his daughter's hut with the intent of killing her and on the way, he fatally stabbed an elderly woman carrying wood before breaking into another hut where he murdered two women who were playing with their two children. Arriving at his daughter's hut, Mogo found her absent, after which he attacked a nearby group of men herding cattle.

While Mogo kept searching for his daughter, other farm workers informed Weller and brought him to the site of the initial killings. Weller armed two natives with rifles and along with eight Maasai herdsmen, who were already wielding spears, they were ordered to search for Mogo and use their weapons if necessary. Weller left to fetch police and a doctor, but the workers did not attempt to confront Mogo as they feared his supposed supernatural powers and believed that he was committing the murders under the influence of witchcraft.

During Weller's absence, Mogo found his daughter herding goats. She fled into the forest, but was chased down and killed by her father. Shortly after, Weller returned with police, who, after a brief search, found Mogo near his hut, herding his cattle and leading them away from their grazing spot, apparently to comply with Weller's prior eviction notice. Upon being apprehended, he demanded that Weller pay him his wages. Mogo cooperated with police and assisted them in retrieving and counting the bodies. In total, six women, three men, and three children had been killed.

== Trial ==
During his trial, Mogo justified the murders to the magistrate by stating that other farm residents had called him a wizard and that his wife had refused him food and intercourse. The judge, Sir Joseph Sheridan, acknowledged that allegations of witchcraft might constitute "grave and sudden provocation" that could contribute to lessened criminal circumstances, but that the specific claim of being a wizard had not been made against him by others. Sheridan declared the defendant sane under the M'Naghten rules and on 9 August 1929, Mogo was found guilty of the murder of his wife Kasenwa. He was sentencd to death by hanging. An appeal at the Court of Appeal for Eastern Africa was dismissed on 4 December 1929. Mogo was executed on 23 January 1930.
