= 1897 Gunsat's Kampong murders =

Mass stabbing in North Borneo

- Location: Gunsat's Kampong, Province Dent, North Borneo (modern-day Sabah, Malaysia
- Date: 27 May 1897
- Weapon: Knife
- Deaths: 15
- Injuries: 3
- Perpetrator: Antakin
- Defender: Rungus

On 27 May 1897, a mass stabbing took place in Gunsat's Kampong, near Keningau, North Borneo. Fifteen people were killed and three were injured before the perpetrator was shot and killed by local security.

== Background ==
In the 19th century, mass murders by single perpetrators were considered unusual. Such acts of violence, typically committed spontaneously and targeting people at random, especially when the perpetrator lacked a criminal or ideological motive, were referred to as "amuck" in English-language reports. The term was derived from Malay and "running amuck" was primarily associated with the Austronesian peoples of Southeast Asia.

== Incident ==
A local colonial official, Barraut, was informed of an ongoing situation in Gunsat's Kampong, with an initial estimate of two dead men and one wounded. Barraut, accompanied by another official, Applin, and four police officers of the British North Borneo Constabulary, arrived from Keningau at the affected kampong at noon. By this point, Barraut was informed that the death toll had increased to fifteen, with three more wounded. The perpetrator, Antakin, a native, had been fatally shot by Rungus, a local officer under village chief Gunsat.

Barraut concluded that Antakin was likely motivated by the apparent infidelity of his wife Sumboh, who was amongst those killed, stating that this was "the only excuse [he] can find". Sumboh's supposed lover, Egah, was subsequently taken into custody. Antakin's property was distributed between the families of the deceased.

Information about the murders were published days after the fact in the 1 June 1897 issue of the British North Borneo Herald, which described the killings as "the biggest amok on record".

== Victims ==
Of the deceased, nine were male and six were female. They were of various ages, also including four youths (three male and one female).

- Belawan, female
- Bindong, male
- Dingnat, male
- Lana, male
- Lapidan, female
- Latam, youth
- Pandong, male
- Rumoh, youth
- Sambing, male
- Sindon, female
- Sumboh, female
- Tadauh, female
- Telukhan, male
- Tuangud, youth
- Umok, female

The three injured were Lindas, an elderly woman; Lasan, a young adult woman; and Sudidit, a male of unspecified age. They were treated on-site by a travelling dresser.
