= Mesac Damas =

American mass murderer (born 1976)

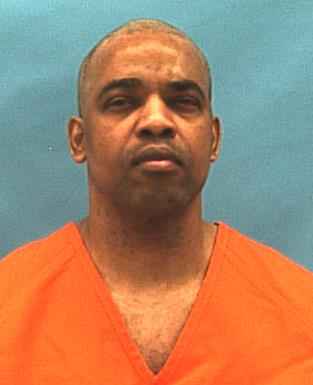
- Florida Department of Corrections photo
- Born: July 2, 1976 (age 50); Haiti
- Spouse: Guerline Damas
- Children: Meshach, Marven, Maven, Megan, Morgan
- Status: Incarcerated
- Conviction: First degree murder (6 counts)
- Penalty: Death

Mesac Damas (born July 2, 1976) is an American man convicted of the murder of his wife and five children at their home in Collier County, Florida, in 2009.

== Early life ==
Mesac Damas was born in Haiti on July 2, 1976. Damas had an unstable family life and was influenced in his youth by domestic violence and poverty.

He was raised an Evangelical Christian by his mother and father until the age of 10 when his parents left for the United States, leaving him in Haiti with extended family members who practiced Haitian Voodoo. As an adult, Damas identifies as an Evangelical Christian.

At the age of 19, Damas left Haiti and relocated to the United States, where he has lived ever since.

At the time of the murders, Damas was 33 years old and worked as a chef at a local ale house. He described himself as "the best of the best" in his line of work.

In January 2009, eight months prior to the murders, Damas was arrested for domestic violence battery against his wife, Guerline, whom he had been with for 12 years. The incident arose over Damas' suspicions of unfaithfulness on the part of his wife.

== Murders ==
In a statement to US Marshals, Damas divulged that on Wednesday, September 16, 2009, his wife, Guerline Damas, brought up the topic of divorce while at home that evening. Damas stated that the conversation became frenzied, and that at one point he said to his wife, "Divorce me? I'll [expletive] kill you."

The following morning, Thursday, September 17, 2009, Damas followed his wife to work for her 5:00AM shift at Publix to make sure she was "really there". Another argument then ensued when she discovered that he had followed her.

Damas stated that the conversation of the night before lingered in his mind all day, causing him to become increasingly angry over the subject. Damas reported to work that evening but clocked out after working only two hours, saying that he couldn't work because he wasn't feeling well and had a "pounding headache". Damas would later tell agents that at the time, "bad spirits" and voices were telling him that his wife would leave him.

After leaving work, Damas arrived at a local supermarket where he purchased a Berkley fillet knife, a roll of silver duct tape, and a pack of gum.

When he arrived home, Damas said that his wife did not speak to him except to ask him to sign immigration papers and tell him that she still intended to leave. It was then that Damas grabbed a knife, tied her with a rope, and duct-taped her mouth.

Damas said he could not describe any of the events after that, except to say, "it's bad, it's criminal." When agents asked whether anyone helped him commit the crimes, Damas said that he had help from a "visible spirit" but not an actual physical person. Damas asserted that his actions were carried out as a result of a hex that was placed on him by his mother-in-law and/or a coworker of his.

Damas remained in the house until 7:00 am the following day, thinking about how he was going to kill himself. He then changed his clothes, packed a suitcase, and drove to Miami International Airport.

On Saturday September 19, 2009, the family of Guerline Damas contacted the Collier County Sheriff's Office to file a missing person's report, as they had not heard from Guerline since Thursday, September 17, 2009, and she had not reported to work.

At 7:03 that evening, deputies arrived at the Damas family's residence to conduct a welfare check on Guerline Damas and her five children. It was at this time that deputies entered the residence and noticed what appeared to be blood leaking from a closed door under the stairs, with floor rugs pushed against it to cover the space between the bottom of the door and the tile floor beneath it. The residence was then secured as a possible homicide scene.

Deputies pried open the locked door and found the body of Guerline Damas on the floor of a small bathroom, face down in a large pool of dried blood with a black trash bag over her head and her limbs bound with duct tape.

Her autopsy revealed blunt force injury to her right elbow and right eye, and deep, extensive sharp force injury to her left shoulder and neck.

Deputies then discovered the body of Meshach Damas in a second floor bedroom, face down on a mattress atop an area of dried blood. The autopsy of Meshach Damas revealed sharp force injuries to the palm of his right hand, as well as extensive sharp force injuries encircling almost the entirety of his neck.

Upon entry into another second floor bedroom, deputies discovered the bodies of the remaining four Damas children, two on the bedroom floor beside one another, one on the bed, and one on a mattress on the floor of the bedroom. All four sustained sharp force injuries to their necks.

== Flight and arrest ==
On the morning of Friday, September 18, 2009, Mesac Damas went to Miami International Airport and purchased a ticket for a one-way flight to Port Au Prince, Haiti, where he arrived at 10:50 am the same day.

Damas would later state to US Marshals that he had flown to Haiti to say goodbye to his family, because he "knew what he did was wrong and that he didn't deserve to live".

On September 22, 2009, a warrant was signed by a Collier County judge for the arrest of Mesac Damas for the murder of his wife and five children.

On September 23, 2009, Damas was apprehended by United States Marshal Service agents in Port Au Prince, Haiti. Damas voluntarily provided a lengthy statement to agents at that time, saying, among other things, "I know what I did was wrong. Bad spirits made me do it." and asking agents, "You think I want to live after what I did?"

In a statement to the Naples Daily News the same day, Damas admitted to the murders of his wife and five children, and said that he wished to receive the death penalty for his crimes.

Damas was transported back to Collier County by the US Marshal's Service, where he was incarcerated and held without bond.

== Competency ==
Throughout the pendency of the Damas case, his competency to stand trial was an ongoing question, mainly revolving around his hyper-religious ideation and refusal to cooperate with attorneys, with the court, and with jail staff. Questions of competency caused frequent and significant delays in the progress of the case.

Between September 2010 and March 2011, three experts were appointed by the court to evaluate Damas' competency, resulting in a June 2011 court order finding him competent to proceed. Despite this, competency issues persisted as the case proceeded and as Damas' behavior became more bizarre.

Damas was then re-evaluated and found incompetent to proceed on March 19, 2014, by a court order which cited, "a substantial likelihood that in the near future the defendant will inflict serious bodily harm on himself or another person, as evidenced by recent behavior." Additionally, the order stated that Damas' condition had "substantial probability" of responding well to treatment with the goal of restoring his competency to proceed "in the reasonably foreseeable future." It was at this time that he was committed to the custody of the Department of Children and Families and referred to a mental health treatment facility, where he was admitted in April 2014.

In October 2014, his competency was found to have been restored by a court order, stating that facility records note Damas was "aggressive, manipulative, and deceitful, and would engage in cooperative behavior when necessary to get something he wanted," as well as describing Damas as "grandiose, preoccupied with his own self-worth, entitled and wants to be admired by others, lacks empathy, and arrogant." Reports further state that Damas "has the ability to engage in appropriate behavior, and his refusal to do so at times is a volitional choice, and not a symptom of mental illness".

Having found that his competency had been restored, Damas was set back on track to proceed to trial.

== Jail and courtroom behavior ==
While being held in custody, Damas rejected his legal name and took on a moniker of his own making, "C.O.G." — an acronym meaning "Child of God".

Damas also refused to eat or shower for long periods of time. At least one reported instance involved Damas going without showering for over 30 consecutive days. Local news sources reported that the smell coming from Mesac Damas' cell was so bad at times that it made other inmates physically ill.

Damas routinely refused deputies' orders and was the subject of numerous disciplinary action by jail staff, including at least one incident wherein Damas was sprayed with pepper spray after hiding under his bunk.

Damas' courtroom behavior often became a spectacle and attracted much media attention. One August 2010 court appearance involved Damas singing aloud until his lawyer and the presiding judge told him to calm down. He ceased until the hearing was almost over, but then began again with the outbursts.

Damas was routinely transported by multiple jail deputies to and from his court appearances, at times secured to a safety restraint chair for the safety of staff.

As the case proceeded, Damas' courtroom behavior became generally less disruptive but not necessarily any more cooperative. At nearly every court appearance attended by Damas in 2017, he could be seen sitting silently with his head resting on the table, possibly asleep.

At a hearing on June 23, 2017, Damas unexpectedly rose to his feet and stated in open court that he wanted to discharge his attorneys, represent himself, and plead guilty to the charges against him. At a later hearing on July 21, 2017, to determine his ability to adequately represent himself and enter a guilty plea to six capital felonies, Damas again became uncooperative, making rambling and disjointed statements to the court.

At one hearing in October 2017, Damas handwrote a note to the presiding judge which read, "Go ahead, continue your work, may my blood be upon your shoulders," signing the note "C.O.G."

== Disposition ==
On September 5, 2017, Mesac Damas pleaded guilty to all six counts of first degree premeditated murder. Sentencing was deferred until October 27, 2017, when Collier Circuit Judge Christine H. Greider sentenced Mesac Damas to concurrent death sentences on all six counts.

In January 2019, the Supreme Court affirmed the original sentence, confirming six death sentences.

== See also ==
- Capital punishment in Florida
- List of death row inmates in the United States § Florida
