= Chantada stabbing =

1989 mass stabbing in Lugo, Spain

- Location: Chantada, Province of Lugo, Galicia, Spain
- Date: 8 March 1989
- Attack type: Mass stabbing
- Weapons: Knife, axe, arson
- Deaths: 8 (including the perpetrator)
- Injuries: 6–7
- Perpetrator: Paulino Fernández Vázquez
- Motive: Fear of losing land

On 8 March 1989 a mass stabbing took place in Chantada, Province of Lugo, Galicia, Spain, during which 64-year-old Paulino Fernández killed seven people and wounded six or seven.

== Attack ==
On 8 March 1989, Paulino Fernández travelled from his home in Surribas to Chantada. There, he spoke with his lawyer about the land acquired. According to the lawyer, he was more nervous and depressed than usual. He then talked to the notary and later did some work with his brother. At noon, he returned to Surribas. There he dined with his brother and his wife. He talked about the land they wanted to take from him. After lunch, the brother and wife went to friends. At 2:30 p.m., he left his house with a knife and met his neighbor, who was chopping wood.

He asked a neighbor what a group of people standing on the street was doing. A neighbor told him that they were waiting for a bus to take them to the funeral. He stabbed a neighbor several times and ran after him, but the neighbor ran away from him. A neighbor asked for help from people on the street, and he was taken by car to a hospital in Chantada. Neighbors did not pay much attention to the attack, got on a bus, and went to the funeral. Paulino then returned home, drove the cows out to graze, and drove them to Quinzán. He saw four people working on the farm, "A Lamela". Despite the fact that they all had sickles, Paulino killed three with a knife on the spot and wounded one woman. She tried to run away, but he caught up and killed her. He then met a neighbor and seriously injured him. He then went to Surribas via Quinzán. Along the way, he attacked seven neighbors. Two of them died on the spot, one died 20 days later in hospital, and four or five others were injured. He also did not attack some people along the way. He also used an ax during the attack. At the end of the attack, one man managed to take a knife from him, and Paulino went home. His brother learned of the massacre and took Paulino's wife out of the house. When he returned, he set fire to the house and lay down on the bed. He died in the fire. During the fire, his body fell to the ground floor of the stable and was found there. His neighbors also heard a tractor explode during the fire.

== Perpetrator ==
Paulino Fernández Vázquez was born in 1925 in Surribas, Chantada. He was a farmer, had 14 cows, and bought a tractor shortly before the attack. He lived with his wife; they had no children. He married 30 years before the attack. His wife was 12 years older than him. She was blind, deaf, and had a hip fracture. Neighbors and acquaintances described him as calm, closed, and stingy. He had no conflicts with neighbors. Some time before the attack, he bought several plots of land from his relatives in Brazil. After the purchase, he did not register the land in the cadastre in his own name. Tax receipts were received in the names of previous owners. This was done so as not to pay taxes. After the purchase, he began to worry that this land would be taken away from him. He told his relatives that he was afraid that his neighbors would take the land from him. He also became nervous and complained of severe headaches. His lawyer reassured him that no one would take his land. In 1971, he was diagnosed with depressive syndrome with a pathological reflex that affected his stomach and liver. Also, this year, he went to a psychiatrist. Three years later, he returned to a psychiatrist, and his diagnosis largely coincided with the previous one. He also found an organic reflection of the rheumatic disease. He last consulted a psychiatrist in 1988. His wife recalled that he had a single attack of insanity as a child and that there were many images of saints on his bedside table.
