= 2021 Vetlanda attack =

Stabbing in Vetlanda, Jönköping County, Sweden

Vetlanda stabbing attack
- Location: 57.425°N 15.085°E; Vetlanda, Sweden
- Date: 3 March 2021; 14:53 (UTC+01:00)
- Target: Civilians
- Attack type: Mass stabbing
- Deaths: 0
- Injuries: 7 victims +1 perpetrator
- Perpetrator: Tamim Sultani

On 3 March 2021 at around 15:00 local time, a 22-year-old man stabbed seven people in Vetlanda, Sweden. All victims survived; the perpetrator was wounded by police during his arrest. He was convicted of seven counts of attempted murder as well as a minor narcotics offense and sentenced to life imprisonment in July 2021.

== Attack ==
Some minutes before 14:55 local time, near the street of Bangårdsgatan in the southern Swedish locality of Vetlanda, a man went on a 19-minute mass stabbing rampage in the streets, attacking random pedestrians with a knife. The police received its first emergency calls at 14:54 local time, with the first patrol arriving at 15:10. Three minutes later, the attacker was shot by police and wounded, before being arrested. Police said that five different crime scenes were identified, hundreds of metres apart.

The police investigation concluded that the attack was not a terrorist act. An investigation by the Swedish National Board of Forensic Medicine found that the perpetrator was not suffering from a severe mental disorder (allvarlig psykisk störning, a Swedish legal term), during the attack. This meant that he could be sent to prison when found guilty instead of a psychiatric institution.

== Victims ==
Seven civilians were stabbed. The oldest victim was born in 1945, and the youngest was born in 1985. They were all men. All casualties, including the perpetrator, were hospitalised. Three of them were initially in life-threatening, critical condition; two were seriously injured, two others were moderately injured and one individual was slightly injured.

== Perpetrator ==
The perpetrator is Tamim Sultani, an Afghan who had sought asylum in Sweden claiming to be 22 years old and lived in an apartment in Vetlanda. According to public records, he applied for asylum in Norway using an Afghan passport which said he was born in 1988. Norway rejected his application. He then migrated to in Sweden in 2018 and applied for asylum again, this time saying he was born in 1999. He received a temporary residence permit which was later extended. The Swedish Migration Agency did not send him back to Norway which they should have according to the Dublin Regulation. He moved to Vetlanda in April 2020, from a nearby town. According to his neighbours he spoke Swedish poorly and had no English knowledge, which made communication with him difficult. He was frequently helped by a woman from the social services. He had a previous conviction for drug offences and was known by the police for committing minor offences.

== Trial ==
Sultani was prosecuted by the Eksjö District Court but the trial was held in the high-security premises of Jönköping District Court. The trial started 21 May. He was found guilty of seven attempted murder and a minor narcotics offense. He was sentenced to life in prison and deportation from Sweden and ordered to pay damages to each stabbing victim.
