= 1956 San Nicolas murders =

Mass stabbing in the Philippines

- Location: San Nicolas, Palawan, Philippines
- Date: October 11, 1956
- Weapons: Spear; Bolo knife
- Deaths: 18 (including two unborn children)
- Injuries: 1
- Perpetrator: Domingo Salazar
- Convictions: Murder x16 Frustrated murder Attempted murder x2

On October 11, 1956, a mass stabbing took place in the San Nicolas neighborhood of Roxas, Palawan, Philippines. The perpetrator, 42-year-old Domingo Salazar, killed 16 people with a spear and bolo before surrendering to authorities.

After initially being sentenced to death, the Supreme Court of the Philippines decided in People of the Philippines v. Salazar that the perpetrator was to receive a reduced penalty of multiple prison sentences.

== Killings ==
On the morning of October 11, 1956, Salazar asked his pregnant wife Máxima Pacho to accompany him while gathering nipa for the repair of their house. Before they could leave together, Máxima's pregnant sister Romana arrived and invited her to get palay at the latter's house. Máxima agreed to the offer and declined to help her husband in the house repairs. Salazar was angered by this and using a spear and bolo knife, he first killed Romana before murdering Máxima and her nephew Fortunato Nares Jr. After walking 800 metres (0.50 mi) from the house, Salazar successively entered four neighboring residences, murdering everyone he found inside.

Salazar then went to the grounds of the sitio's school, where he stabbed Manuel Adion in the back with the spear; Adion was able to escape with a perforated left lung and survived following emergency treatment. Salazar then chased two other men, Pablo Páz and Severino Adion, and threw his spear at them, hitting neither, before trying to enter the schoolhouse. As the present teacher present had already locked and barricaded the schoolhouse's door and windows, Salazar was unable to force his way in. He lastly went to the chapel and tolled the bell, calling for everybody to come and asking to be killed, to no response.

Eventually, two armed guards and a barrio officer arrived at the scene and persuaded Salazar to surrender. They did so by promising that they would shoot and kill him at the wharf, but only after he had signed a piece of paper that was to protect them from repercussions from higher authorities. When Salazar lay down his arms and was about to affix his thumbmark on the paper, he was subdued and arrested.

== Victims ==
- Urbana Abique, 50
- Felisa Adion, 37
- Felomina Baaco, 48
- Salome Baaco, 23
- Leonila Llavan, 25
- Manuela Llavan, 39
- Fortunato Nares Jr., 5, son of Romana Pacho
- Henry Pacaldo, 5
- Baudelio Pacho, 18
- Máxima Pacho, 37, Salazar's common-law wife
- Romana Pacho, 34, Maxima Pacho's sister
- Aurelia Páz, 7
- Herminia Páz, 6 months
- Lilia Paz, 5
- Nenita Sausa, 5
- Lolita Yayen, 17

== Perpetrator ==
Domingo Salazar was a Moro originally from Zamboanga. He was a farmer who also used the alias name Darquez. Salazar had moved to the San Nicolas barangay, then a barrio, several years before the killings. Salazar had a common-law marriage with his wife Máxima Pacho. Under the then-existent version of the civil code, their relationship was viewed as illegitimate and not binding since Máxima was Christian and Salazar was Muslim.

=== Motive ===
The American newspaper Eugene Register-Guard initially cited a report claiming Salazar was affected by "lingering illness" and "failure to collect outstanding debt". However, by the time of his trial, it was established that Salazar believed that his wife Máxima was having an affair with her sister Romana's husband Fortunato Nares and that he was not the father in her pregnancy. Salazar confessed to planning the killings for several days as "vindication of his honor".

== People of the Philippines v. Salazar ==
People of the Philippines v. Salazar
- Court: Supreme Court of the Philippines en banc

Full case name
- The People of the Philippines v. Domingo Salazar alias Darquez
- Decided: June 30, 1959
- G.R. number: L-11601
- Concurrence: Paras, Bengzon, Padilla, Montemayor, Bautista Angelo, Labrador, Concepcion, Endencia, Barrera

Salazar waived his right to preliminary investigation. On October 24, 1956, Salazar's physical and mental state was examined by the chief of the Puerto Princesa Hospital, who declared him normal and sane. While at the hospital, Salazar made his confession to the Provincial Commander of Puerto Princesa in presence of a justice of the peace, repeating the sequence of events and details of each murder. Salazar was consulted in the written transcription into Tagalog and affirmed that the confession was voluntary.

=== Trial ===
At the regional trial court in Roxas, Salazar was charged with sixteen counts of murder, one count of frustrated murder, and two counts of attempted murder. He was given legal counsel by two court-appointed lawyers. At his arraignment, Salazar was asked to describe the course of the murders, but he refused since he had already done so earlier. After the confession was read to Salazar, the remaining evidence was presented, which included the spear used in most of the murders, witness affidavits, crime scene sketches, and a statement written by Manuel Adion. Court proceedings were translated for Salazar, who pleaded guilty.

Salazar was convicted and received sixteen death sentences, one for each murder count, an 8 to 17-year prison sentence for frustrated murder, and a 2 to 8-year prison sentence for each of the attempted murders. He was also required to indemnify each of the heirs of the fatal victims a sum of ₱3,000, and also financially compensate the three surviving victims.

=== Appeal ===
Salazar's defense appealed the case, which was then reviewed by the Supreme Court. His defense sought to reduce the murder conviction by contesting premeditation and treachery as described by the lower court, maintaining that Salazar had not agreed with these factors with his guilty plea. The appeal asserted that Salazar was affected by a culture-bound syndrome, specifically the juramentado of the Moro people, in similar vein as amok syndrome, contending that the killings should not have been judged as murder as defined by Philippine law; per Salazar's defense, in Moro culture, someone "running juramentado" is traditionally killed during the act to minimise deaths. The arguments were dismissed as without merit, with an additional note that Salazar could not invoke jealousy to mitigate premeditation in the murders as a crime of passion since he acknowledged both planning of the killings and awareness of the apparent infidelity for several days. However, the Supreme Court found that Salazar's guilty plea offset the aggravating factor of treachery.

On June 30, 1959, the decision was made to retain the conviction, but the penalty was reduced to a medium period per the Revised Penal Code. As such, the three sentences for the murders of Máxima Pacho, Romana Pacho, and Fortunato Nares, was changed to reclusión perpetua (20 to 40 years imprisonment and a lifetime barring on holding a political office), the frustrated murder sentence was changed to 4 to 12 years imprisonment, and the two attempted murder sentences was changed to 4 months to 6 years imprisonment each. The indemnity payable to his victims' relatives was raised to ₱6,000.
