= Katan (cloth) =

Thin silk cloth

Katan was a thin silk cloth. It was made of double twisted yarns of pure silk yarns in warp and weft both.

== Texture ==
Katan was a superfine, delicate cloth. It is said that ''The cloth goes to the pieces when exposed to the moonlight''

=== Brocade ===
katan butidar : warp and weft with buties in zari or silk (untwisted).

== Mentions ==
European Katan is mentioned in the Ain-i-Akbari in silk stuffs.
