= Mishima factory stabbings =

2025 crime in Japan

- Location: 35.110713958740234°N 138.9251708984375°E; 8-1 Minamifutsukamachi, Mishima, Shizuoka 411-0832, Japan
- Date: 26 December 2025; 16:25 (JST)
- Target: Employees at the Mishima Yokohama Rubber Company facility
- Attack type: Mass stabbing, Workplace violence, Chemical attack
- Weapons: Survival knife; Bleach
- Deaths: 0
- Injuries: 15 (8 by stabbing, 7 via chemical-spraying)
- Perpetrator: Masaki Oyama
- Motive: Revenge for workplace bullying

On 26 December 2025, a mass stabbing took place at the Yokohama Rubber Company facility in Mishima, Shizuoka Prefecture, Japan. The suspect, identified as a former employee, stabbed eight male employees with a knife and sprayed seven other men with bleach.

== Incident ==
During the evening shift, at approximately 16:34 JST, a former employee, wearing a gas mask and armed with a knife, walked into his business and immediately stabbed and wounded eight male workers one-by-one at the facility. The suspect sprayed bleach all over seven other men while attempting to stop the suspect. Officials at the Asahi Shimbun investigated that the man had ties to the factory and was a former employee at the plant. He was arrested and charged with a dozen counts of attempted murder.

== Victims ==
All of the victims are male employees at the factory, ranged in age from 20 to 60. Out of the fifteen men injured, six of the victims were taken to nearby hospitals in critical condition but all survived.

== Perpetrator ==
Shortly after the stabbings, the perpetrator was identified as Masaki Oyama of Mishima (born 1987), a 38-year-old former employee. During an interview, police confirmed that Oyama wielded a survival knife in the attack. He gave his motive as revenge for perceived workplace bullying. Two days after the attack, Oyama was indicted on attempted murder on one of the victims, a 28-year-old male employee, with a similar knife-looking object at the same plant.

== Investigation ==
Two days after the attack, the Shizuoka Prefectural Police searched Oyama's house in Mishima, where only a few details were immediately released. During questioning, Oyama stated that he targeted them, and was both depressed and "dissatisfied with interpersonal relationships at work."
