= Nanzheng District =

Nanzheng 南郑区 Nan-cheng
- District
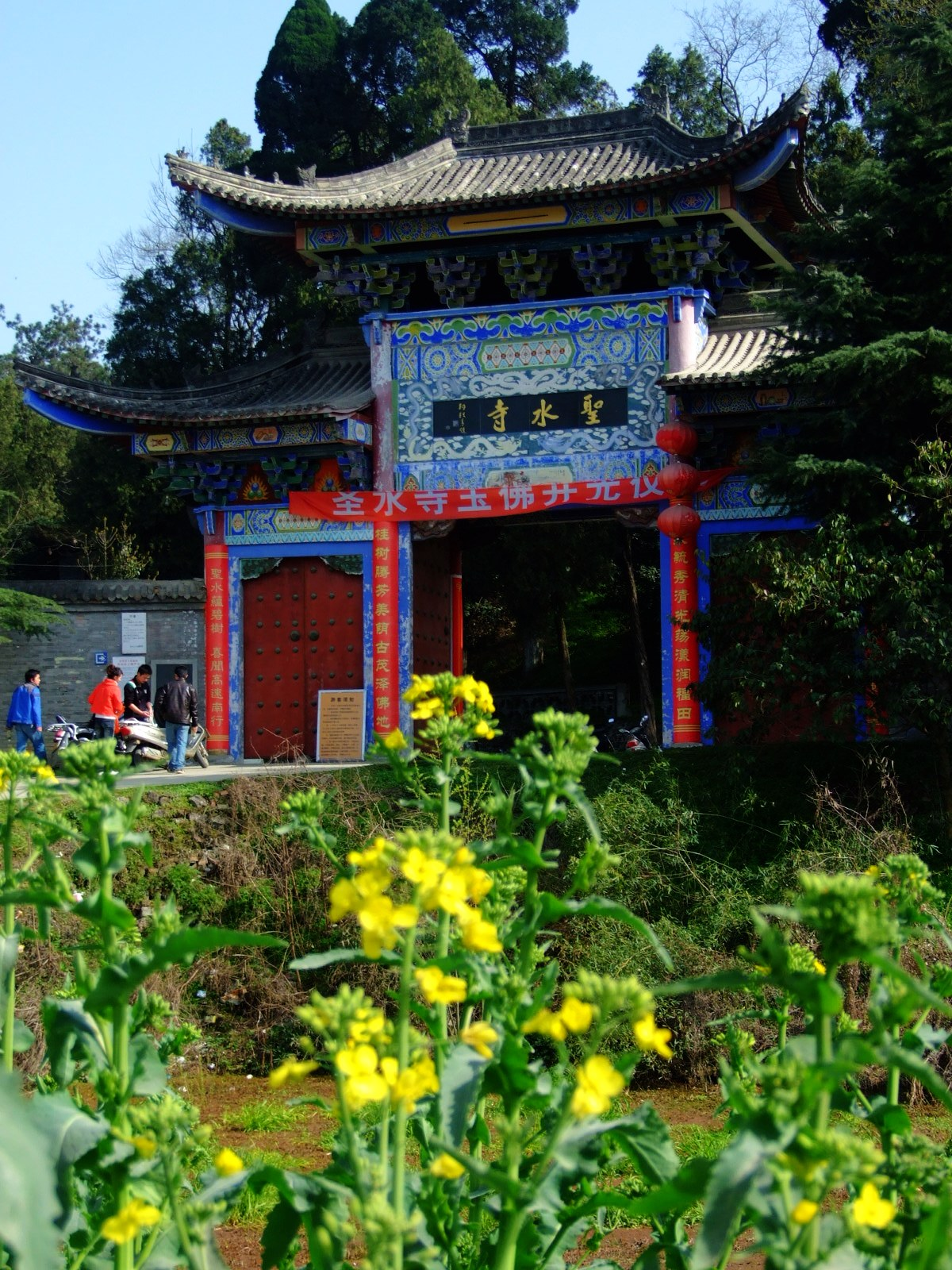
- The Paifang of the Shengshui Temple (圣水寺)

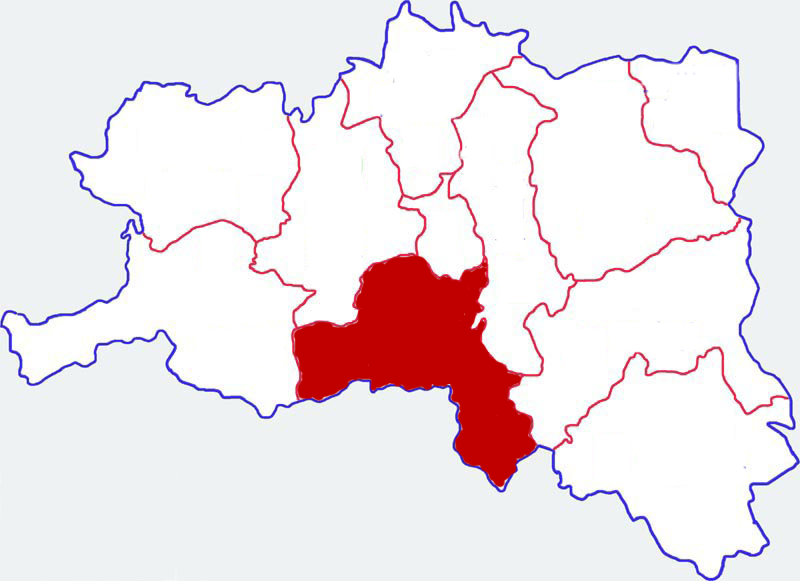
- Location in Hanzhong

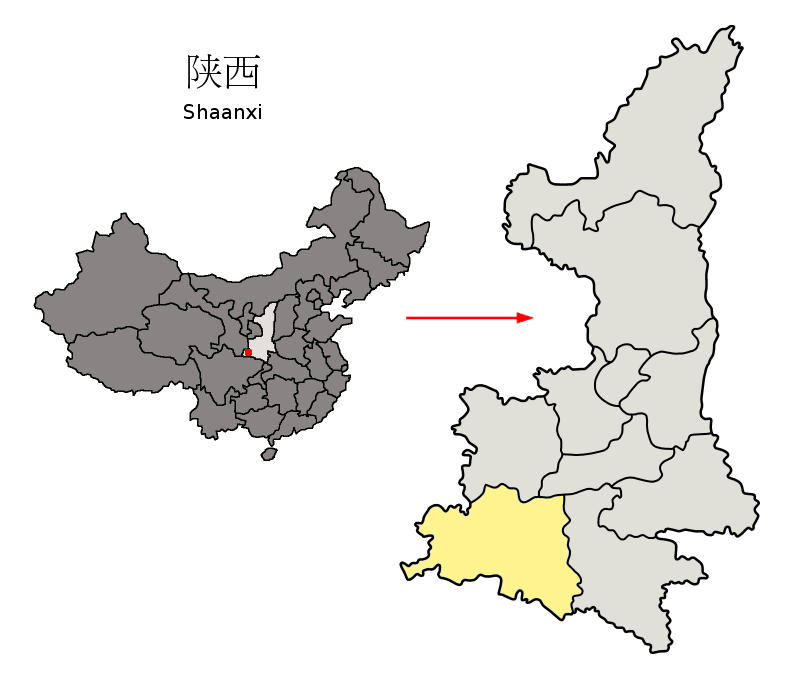
- Hanzhong in Shaanxi
- Coordinates: 33°0′N 106°56′E
- Country: People's Republic of China
- Province: Shaanxi
- Prefecture-level city: Hanzhong

Area
  - Total: 2,809.03 km^{2} (1,084.57 sq mi)

Population (2019)
  - Total: 477,400
  - Density: 170.0/km^{2} (440.2/sq mi)
- Time zone: UTC+8 (China Standard)
- Postal code: 723100
- Area code: 0916
- Website: nanzheng.gov.cn

Nanzheng District (simplified Chinese: 南郑区; traditional Chinese: 南鄭區; pinyin: Nánzhèng Qū), formerly Nanzheng County (simplified Chinese: 南郑县; traditional Chinese: 南鄭縣), is a district of the city of Hanzhong, Shaanxi province, China, bordering Sichuan province to the south.

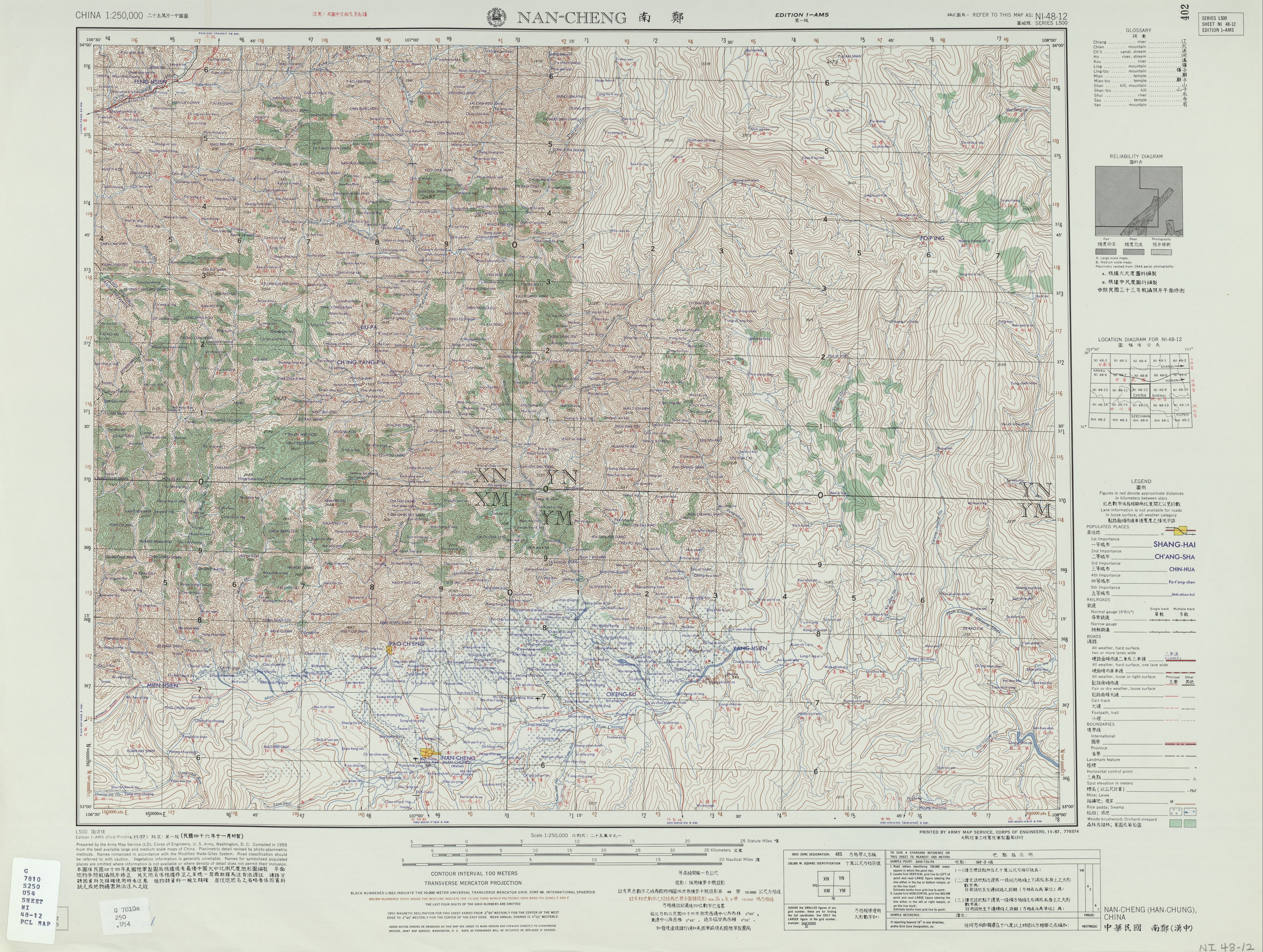
Map including Nanzheng (labeled as 南鄭(漢中) NAN-CHENG (HAN-CHUNG) (Walled)) (AMS, 1955)

== Administrative divisions ==
As of 2019, Nanzheng District is divided to 2 subdistricts and 20 towns.

Subdistricts

- Hanshan Subdistrict (汉山街道)
- Zhongsuoying Subdistrict (中所营街道)

Towns

- Shengshui (圣水镇)
- Dahekan (大河坎镇)
- Xieshui (协税镇)
- Liangshan (梁山镇)
- Yangchun (阳春镇)
- Gaotai (高台镇)
- Xinji (新集镇)
- Lianshui (濂水镇)
- Huangguan (黄官镇)
- Qingshu (青树镇)
- Hongmiao (红庙镇)
- Moujiaba (牟家坝镇)
- Fa (法镇)
- Xiangshui (湘水镇)
- Xiaonanhai (小南海镇)
- Beiba (碑坝镇)
- Liping (黎坪镇)
- Fucheng (福成镇)
- Lianghe (两河镇)
- Hujiaying (胡家营镇)

== Climate ==
Climate data for Nanzheng, elevation 537 m (1,762 ft), (1991–2020 normals, extremes 1981–present)
Month	Jan	Feb	Mar	Apr	May	Jun	Jul	Aug	Sep	Oct	Nov	Dec	Year
Record high °C (°F)	20.5 (68.9)	22.0 (71.6)	31.1 (88.0)	32.8 (91.0)	35.1 (95.2)	36.9 (98.4)	40.6 (105.1)	40.6 (105.1)	36.7 (98.1)	29.4 (84.9)	22.6 (72.7)	18.4 (65.1)	40.6 (105.1)
Mean daily maximum °C (°F)	7.3 (45.1)	10.5 (50.9)	15.9 (60.6)	22.0 (71.6)	26.0 (78.8)	28.9 (84.0)	30.8 (87.4)	30.4 (86.7)	24.8 (76.6)	19.1 (66.4)	13.2 (55.8)	8.1 (46.6)	19.8 (67.5)
Daily mean °C (°F)	2.7 (36.9)	5.6 (42.1)	10.2 (50.4)	15.8 (60.4)	20.0 (68.0)	23.8 (74.8)	25.9 (78.6)	25.2 (77.4)	20.4 (68.7)	15.0 (59.0)	9.1 (48.4)	3.9 (39.0)	14.8 (58.6)
Mean daily minimum °C (°F)	−0.3 (31.5)	2.2 (36.0)	6.2 (43.2)	11.2 (52.2)	15.4 (59.7)	19.8 (67.6)	22.2 (72.0)	21.5 (70.7)	17.5 (63.5)	12.4 (54.3)	6.3 (43.3)	1.2 (34.2)	11.3 (52.4)
Record low °C (°F)	−6.6 (20.1)	−5.6 (21.9)	−3.7 (25.3)	0.5 (32.9)	6.6 (43.9)	12.6 (54.7)	16.2 (61.2)	14.1 (57.4)	9.4 (48.9)	−1.4 (29.5)	−2.7 (27.1)	−8.9 (16.0)	−8.9 (16.0)
Average precipitation mm (inches)	8.9 (0.35)	14.0 (0.55)	32.7 (1.29)	58.6 (2.31)	95.3 (3.75)	113.1 (4.45)	160.5 (6.32)	129.7 (5.11)	149.3 (5.88)	87.3 (3.44)	37.1 (1.46)	9.2 (0.36)	895.7 (35.27)
Average precipitation days (≥ 0.1 mm)	6.0	7.0	9.2	9.8	12.5	12.7	13.3	12.4	14.2	13.6	9.4	6.5	126.6
Average snowy days	4.1	2.2	0.8	0.1	0	0	0	0	0	0	0.5	1.6	9.3
Average relative humidity (%)	79	76	74	75	75	77	81	81	85	87	87	82	80
Mean monthly sunshine hours	76.0	77.4	118.6	154.1	166.0	164.4	181.6	176.9	102.0	88.4	75.4	77.0	1,457.8
Percentage possible sunshine	24	25	32	39	39	38	42	43	28	25	24	25	32
Source: China Meteorological Administration all-time extreme temperature
