= Jingju Temple =

Jingju Temple (simplified Chinese: 净居寺; traditional Chinese: 凈居寺; pinyin: Jìngjū Sì), may refer to:

- Jingju Temple (Ji'an), in Ji'an, Jiangxi, China
- Jingju Temple (Xinyang), in Xinyang, Henan, China
- Jingju Temple (Yiwu), in Yiwu, Zhejiang, China
- Jingju Temple (Taizhou), in Taizhou, Zhejiang, China
- Jingju Temple (Mount Jiuhua), in Mount Jiuhua, Anhui, China
