= Henan Xinyang Senior High School =

- 河南省信阳高级中学
- Xinyang, Henan, PRC

Information
- Type: Senior High School
- Established: 1938
- President: Lewu Bi
- Staff: 260 (In 2008)
- Enrollment: 4800 (In 2008)
- Website: Official Website

Henan Xinyang Senior High School or Xinyang Senior High School (short for XSHS) is located in Xinyang - a historical and agricultural city, which is a Southeast Part of Henan Province, PRC. The school is known as The Champion Scholar High School in Henan.

== History ==
Founded in 1938 in Gansu Province, the name was National Number Ten Middle School of China (Republic of).

The school was moved to Xinyang in 1946 and given the name of Henan Provincial Middle School of Xinyang. At that time, there were only 8 classes, 400 students and 42 teachers.

Three years later, i.e. after PLA occupied Xinyang in 1949, several middle schools were merged with the school, it was then called Xinyang Middle School.

In 1978, the school was renamed Xinyang Senior High School.

== New Campus ==
The new campus was built in the year 2002, lying at the foot of Mountain Xianshan, bordering on Shihe River, overlooked by Mountain Jigongshan, top four famous summer resorts in China. The new school consists of 60 classes, having a large variety of buildings, entertainment/sport facilities and books.

== Reputation ==
In the National Higher Education Entrance Examination (mostly known as Gaokao), about 200 students got the offer from Tsinghua University, Peking University and University of Science and Technology of China since 1985. Moreover, there were seven students entitled The Gaokao Champion of Henan Province. Now, the school is known as The Champion Scholar High School in Henan.

== See also ==
- Maojian tea
- Xinyang city
