= Chenpeng Village Primary School stabbing =

2012 mass stabbing in Henan province, China

- Security footage of the attack at the school gates
- Native name: 光山校园血案 光山县"12·14"校园伤害案
- Location: 31°55′27.19″N 114°46′4.58″E; Chenpeng, Henan, China
- Date: 14 December 2012; Reported to police at 7:40 a.m. Beijing Time (GMT+8)
- Target: Students and an elderly woman
- Attack type: Mass stabbing, attempted pedicide, school attack
- Weapon: Kitchen knife
- Deaths: 0
- Injuries: 24
- Perpetrator: Min Yongjun
- Motive: Doomsday delusions

On December 14, 2012, between 7:00 and 8:00 a.m. local time, a mass stabbing took place at Chenpeng Village Primary School (simplified Chinese: 陈棚村完全小学; traditional Chinese: 陳棚村完全小學; pinyin: Chénpéng Cūn Wánquán Xiǎoxué (Note: "Chenpeng Village Complete/Total Elementary School", meaning it covers years one through six)) in Wenshu Township, Guangshan County, Henan province, China. 36-year-old villager Min Yongjun stabbed 24 people, including 23 children and an elderly woman who lived near the school.

The incident followed other school attacks in China since 2010 committed by mentally disturbed perpetrators involved in personal disputes or unhappy with the rapid changes occurring in Chinese society. Following the attack, measures were taken for security guards to be posted at schools across China.

== Attack ==
Due to strict gun control laws in China, knives are usually the weapon of choice in violent crimes.

Min first broke into the home of Xiang Jiaying, aged 84 or 85, and assaulted the occupant before grabbing a knife from the kitchen. During the ensuing struggle for the knife, Xiang was severely injured while Min fled.

The attack on the children occurred at the entrance of the school, as students were arriving for classes set to begin at 8:00 a.m. At around 7:40 a.m., Min pursued the children with the knife he had stolen from the elderly woman's house and slashed them, many on their heads. Xinhua reported that some of the children had had fingers or ears cut off in the knife attack. Min was restrained at the primary school and transferred to police custody.

== Victims ==
Immediately after the attack, 22 people were treated at three hospitals, ten at Guangshan County People's Hospital, ten at Guangshan County Traditional Chinese Medicine Hospital, and two at Xiancheng Hospital, the latter outside of Guangshan County.

As described during a supplementary investigation by Xinyang Municipal People's Procuratorate in January 2013, of the 23 children counted as injured, seven had serious wounds and eleven had minor injuries; the remaining five were determined to have not been wounded at all.

== Perpetrator ==
The perpetrator was Min Yongjun (simplified Chinese: 闵拥军; traditional Chinese: 閔擁軍; pinyin: Mǐn Yōngjūn), (Note: Initially misidentified as Min Yingjun (simplified Chinese: 闵应军; traditional Chinese: 閔應軍; pinyin: Mǐn Yìngjūn, a resident of the same village as Min Yongjun.) from Zhoupeng village, also part of Wenshu Township. Min had a history of epileptic seizures since 1992, and according to police, the night before the attack, he had severely beaten his parents and his two daughters following an argument after Min's father grounded him after another seizure. Min had apparently spent the entire night running a 10-kilometer distance before breaking into a house at random.

In police custody, Min stated that he committed the stabbing because he felt "doomed" and "hoped to do things to make the world remember him before he died". He said he got the idea to attack a school because he remembered reports from spring 2010 about three prominently reported stabbings at kindergartens in China, such as the Shengshui Temple kindergarten attack in Shaanxi.

Min had been influenced by the 2012 doomsday phenomenon. This was allegedly propagated in China by the Eastern Lightning church. Min stated that he had been listening to "doomsday preaching" by a local woman affiliated with Eastern Lightning before the attack.

=== Legal processes ===
In December 2013, Min Yongjun was found guilty of intentional homicide and sentenced to death. In November 2015, he was re-sentenced to death with a two-year reprieve.

== Response ==
The Guangshan County government established an emergency response team for the incident. The coverage of the incident in local media was tightly controlled, with Beijing usually restricting coverage of such sensitive topics to dissuade copycat attacks, and an article in the Financial Times reported a backlash by Chinese citizens due to the lack of coverage of the school stabbings. An article in the Associated Press similarly wrote that a possible reason why authorities wanted to restrict the news was to either "prevent encouraging others or to play down the crime to keep blame off the government".

Within three days of the attack, officials detained 93 people, including members of Eastern Lightning, for spreading doomsday rumors, such as distributing leaflets that claimed that the sun would no longer shine and a power outage was imminent. By 18 December, a total of over 500 people were arrested across eight provinces for spreading misinformation. 400 of these were arrested in Qinghai province alone.

On 16 December, the suspect was arrested and charged with the crime of endangering public safety by dangerous means.

Six officials were fired because they "handled the incident improperly".

== Reactions ==
Some commentaries situated the knife attacks in the wider context of China's social and economic transformation, noting the inadequacies in the country's health care system for diagnosing and treating citizens with psychiatric distress and illnesses.

As the Chenpeng school attack was followed by the Sandy Hook Elementary School shooting in the United States hours later comparisons were drawn between the two. The difference in gun control laws between the two countries was used to explain the disparity in casualties of the school attacks by journalists and politicians, including U.S. Representative Jerry Nadler. An article in the Associated Press noted that despite the different outcomes, an underlying commonality between the attacks was the increased frequency of school attacks because "attackers often seek out the vulnerable, hoping to amplify their outrage before they themselves often commit suicide."

Comparisons were also drawn between the incident handling by the local and national governments involved. The lack of coverage by Chinese state-run news channels and the lack of any emotional response from the Chinese government at any level were contrasted with the detailed US media coverage and then-US President Barack Obama's national speech, including his commitment to tackling the underlying issues.

== Footage ==
The local police released footage from a security camera showing the attacker barging into the school and attacking a student. The video was noted and analyzed by many news agencies and contributed significantly to the widespread coverage of the incident.

== See also ==
- List of school attacks in China
