= Minggang railway station =

Railway station in Minggang, Pingqiao District, Xinyang, Henan, China

Minggang 明港

General information
- Location: Minggang, Pingqiao District, Xinyang, Henan; China
- Coordinates: 32°28′00″N 114°02′38″E
- Operator: CR Wuhan
- Line: Beijing–Guangzhou railway
- Distance: Beijing–Guangzhou railway: 918 kilometres (570 mi) from Beijing West; 1,378 kilometres (856 mi) from Guangzhou
- Platforms: 3 (1 side platform and 1 island platform)
- Tracks: 6

Other information
- Station code: 20888 (TMIS code); MGN (telegraph code); MGA (Pinyin code)
- Classification: Class 3 station (三等站)

History
- Opened: 1903; 123 years ago

Services
| Preceding station | China Railway | Following station |
|---|---|---|
| Queshan towards Beijing or Beijing West | Beijing–Guangzhou railway | Xinyang towards Guangzhou |
Location
- Location within Henan Location within China

Minggang railway station (Chinese: 明港站) is a station on Beijing–Guangzhou railway in Minggang, Pingqiao District, Xinyang, Henan.

== History ==
The station was established in 1903.

There is no regular scheduled passenger trains stop at this station after 2014, although ticket services remain at the station.
