= Liangting Township =

Geographical division in Xinyang City, China

Liangting 凉亭乡
- Township
- Location in Henan
- Coordinates: 31°46′52″N 115°00′52″E
- Country: People's Republic of China
- Province: Henan
- Prefecture-level city: Xinyang
- County: Guangshan County
- Time zone: UTC+8 (China Standard)

Liangting Township is a township situated in the southeast region of Guangshan County in Xinyang City, Henan Province. It shares borders with Baiqueyuan Town to the east, Balifan Town in Xinxian County to the south, Popihe Town to the west, and Zhuanqiao Town to the north. The name of Liangting can be derived back to the Qing dynasty. The highest mountain is the Saishan with 374.3 meters.

In August 1975, the establishment of Baique and Popihe communes led to the formation of Liangting commune. However, in February 1983, the authorities reorganized the administrative structure, and the commune was transformed into a township. The township governs 15 administrative villages as of June 2020. Covering an area of 62.5 square kilometers, the township has a registered population of 26,451 as of the end of 2018.

== Economy ==
The major economical industry in Liangting Township is the "Xinyang MaoJian tea", the top 10 traditional tea types, which has lasted around 2000 years.
