= Minquan Subdistrict, Henan =

Minquan Subdistrict 民权街道
- Subdistrict
- Location of Xinhua Subdistrict in Henan
- Coordinates: 32°7′31″N 114°4′28″E
- Country: China
- Province: Henan
- Prefecture-level city: Xinyang
- District: Shihe District
- Time zone: UTC+8 (China Standard)

Minquan Subdistrict (simplified Chinese: 民权街道; traditional Chinese: 民權街道; pinyin: Mínquán Jiēdào) is a subdistrict in Shihe District, Xinyang, Henan, China.
