= Maojian =

Maojian may refer to:

- Maojian District (茅箭区), a district of the city of Shiyan, Hubei, People's Republic of China.
- Xinyang Maojian tea (信阳毛尖), a green tea produced in Xinyang, Henan.
