= Xinyang Daily =

Daily newspaper in Xinyang, Henan, China

- Type: Daily newspaper
- Founded: August 1, 1949
- Headquarters: Xinyang, Henan
- OCLC number: 123264586
- Website: ribao.xyxww.com.cn

Xinyang Daily (信阳日报; 信陽日報) is a Henan-based Chinese daily newspaper that is publicly distributed in the whole China. It is published by the Xinyang Daily Office, and is officially launched on October 10, 1988. The newspaper is the organ of Xinyang Municipal Committee of the Chinese Communist Party.

== History ==
Xinyang Daily was formerly known as South Henan People's Post (豫南人民报), which was founded on August 1, 1949, and then suspended and reissued several times, and was reissued on July 23, 1984, when it was called Xinyang Post (信阳报).
