= Wenshu (disambiguation) =

Wenshu most commonly refers to Manjushri (Chinese: 文殊), a bodhisattva in Mahayana Buddhism.

Wenshu may also refer to:

- Wenshu Township (Chinese: 文殊乡), township in Guangshan County, Xinyang city, Henan, China
- Emperor Guangwu of Han (5 BC – AD 57), courtesy name Wenshu (Chinese: 文叔)
- Shou Liang (fl. 250s–280s), courtesy name Wenshu (Chinese: 文淑), Shu Han official and scholar
- Wang Chang (Three Kingdoms) (died 259), courtesy name Wenshu (Chinese: 文舒), Cao Wei military general and politician

== See also ==
- Wenshu Guangfa Tianzun, Taoist deity
- Wenshu Temple (disambiguation)
