= Xinyang Minggang Airport =

Xinyang Minggang Airport 信阳明港机场
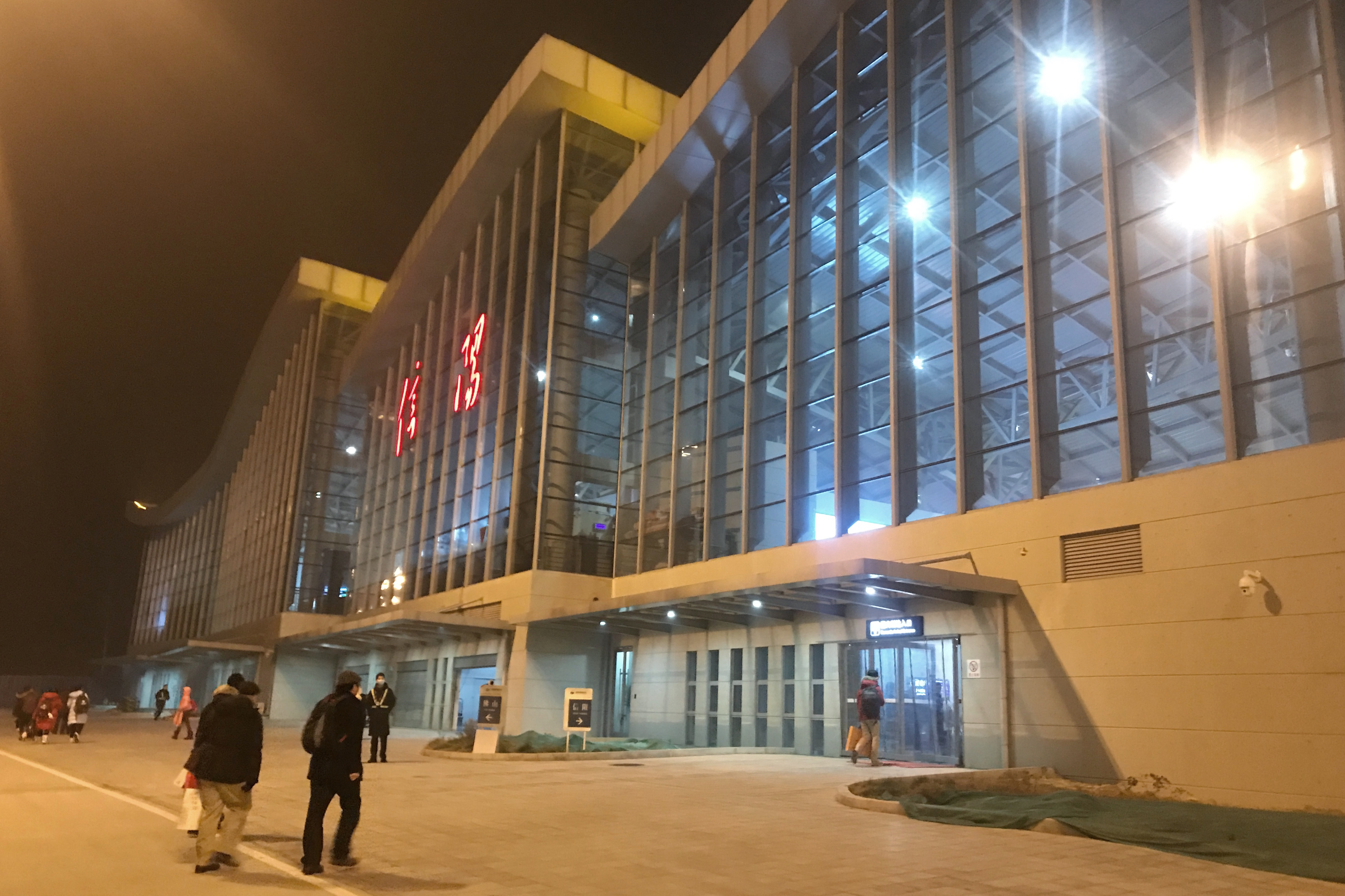
- IATA: XAI; ICAO: ZHXY

Summary
- Airport type: Public / Military
- Serves: Xinyang
- Location: Minggang, Pingqiao, Xinyang, Henan, China
- Opened: 28 October 2018; 7 years ago
- Built: 1931; 95 years ago
- Coordinates: 32°32′29″N 114°04′40″E

Map
- Location of airport in Henan

Runways
Direction	Length		Surface
Direction	m	ft	Surface
07/25	2,700	8,858

Statistics (2025)
- Passengers: 303,868
- Aircraft movements: 2,862
- Source: List of the busiest airports in the People's Republic of China

Xinyang Minggang Airport
- Simplified Chinese: 信阳明港机场
- Traditional Chinese: 信陽明港機場
Transcriptions
Standard Mandarin
- Hanyu Pinyin: Xìnyáng Mínggǎng Jīchǎng

Xinyang Minggang Airport (IATA: XAI, ICAO: ZHXY), or Minggang Air Base, is a dual-use civil and military airport serving the city of Xinyang in Henan Province, China. It is in the town of Minggang in Pingqiao District, about 45 kilometres (28 mi) from downtown Xinyang and 48 kilometres (30 mi) from the city of Zhumadian.

== History ==
The military air base formerly known as Zhumadian Airbase was built in the 1930s and served important national defense operations following the Manchurian Incident; Zhumadian was critical in supporting the Nationalist Chinese Air Force operations in the northern-front during the War of Resistance-World War II, and was where the 4th Fighter-Attack Group of the Chinese Air Force launched their close-air support missions for Chinese ground forces fighting the Imperial Japanese Army at the Battle of Taierzhuang. The airbase was completely modernized in 1958, and in September 2011, the State Council and the Central Military Commission approved the proposal to convert the base to a dual-use airport. Construction began in November 2015, and a test flight was completed on 23 May 2018. The airport was officially opened on 28 October 2018 for commercial passenger operations, with an inaugural China Eastern Airlines MU9921 flight from Xi'an Xianyang International Airport. The construction budget was 360 million yuan.

== Facilities ==
Xinyang Minggang Airport has a runway that is 2,700 meters long and 50 meters wide (class 4C), and a 5,000-square-meter terminal building. It is projected to handle 300,000 passengers and 2,500 tons of cargo per year by 2020.

== Airlines and destinations ==
Airlines	Destinations
Air Chang'an	Xiamen, Xi'an
China Eastern Airlines	Chengdu–Tianfu, Chongqing, Hangzhou, Shanghai–Pudong
GX Airlines	Chengdu–Tianfu, Haikou
Okay Airways	Shenzhen, Tianjin

== See also ==
- List of airports in China
- List of the busiest airports in China
- List of People's Liberation Army Air Force airbases
