= XAC =

XAC may refer to:

- the IATA code for Arcachon - La Teste-de-Buch Airport, France
- the ISO 639-3 code for the Kachari language
- Xinyang Agricultural College
- Xi'an Aircraft Industrial Corporation, also known as Xi'an Aircraft Company Limited
- XacBank, a bank in Mongolia
- Xbox Adaptive Controller, a video game controller designed by Microsoft for Windows PCs and the Xbox One and Xbox Series X/S video game consoles
