= QSH =

QSH may refer to:

- QSH, the Beijing–Guangzhou railway Pinyin code for Queshan railway station, Zhumadian, Henan, China
- QSH, the China Railway Pinyin code for Qingsheng railway station, Guangzhou, Guangdong, China
