= Xinyang Normal University =

University in Xinyang, China

- 信阳师范大学
- Type: Public
- Established: 1975
- Administrative staff: 940
- Students: 16000
- Location: Xinyang, Henan, PRC
- Website: www.xynu.edu.cn

Xinyang Normal University (XYNU) is located in Xinyang city with famous cultural and historical interests in the south of Central China's Henan province.

== History ==
Founded in 1975, XYNU was a sub-college in Xinyang City belonging to Kaifeng Teachers' College (the origin of Henan University). In 1998, XYNU was authorised by the State Council of China to award MA degrees.

== Academics ==
- School of Politics and Law
- School of Literature
- School of Life Sciences
- School of Education Science
- School of Chemistry＆ Chemical Engineering
- School of Continuing Education
- Huarui College
- School of Economics ＆Management
- School of Physics＆ Electronic Engineering
- School of Mathematics ＆ Information Science
- Department of Mass Communication
- Department of Physical Education
- Department of Music
- Department of History
- Department of Fine Arts
- Foreign Languages Department
- Department of Architectural Engineering
- Department of English Teaching and Research
- Urban and Environmental Science Department
- Department of Marxism Teaching ＆ Research
- Department of Computer Science and Technology

== Glory ==
In 2007, XYNU was entitled Excellent University in the national education evaluation program.

In 2009, XYNU was nominated National Role Model in Ethical and Cultural Progress.

'XYNU is the cradle of prospective teachers', said Mr Fei Xiaotong, the famous social activist and educationist.

== See also ==
- Maojian tea
- Xinyang city
- Fei Xiaotong
