= Liangxiang (disambiguation) =

Liangxiang may refer to:

- Liangxiang, Beijing (良乡地区), in Fangshan District, Beijing
- Liang Xiang, Chinese politician

== See also ==
- Liangting, Susong County (凉亭镇), town in southern Anhui
- Liangting Township (凉亭乡), Huaining County, Anhui
