= QSN =

QSN may refer to:

- QSN, the IATA code for San Nicolás de Bari Airport, Mayabeque Province, Cuba
- QSN, the telegraph code for Queshan railway station, Zhumadian, Henan, China
