= Minggang =

Town in Henan, China

Coordinates: 32°28′08″N 114°03′00″E

Minggang (Chinese: 明港; pinyin: Mínggǎng) is a town in Pingqiao District, Xinyang, Henan Province in Central China (central plain). The population in (2005) was 69,100.

== Transport ==
=== Airport ===
- Xinyang Minggang Airport

=== Railway Stations ===
- Minggang railway station
- Minggang East railway station
