= List of school attacks in China =

Below is a chronological list of school attacks in China.

== 1990s ==
=== July 1995 ===
On July 10, 1995, Dong Chi (董驰), armed with a double-barreled shotgun and garden shears, attacked staff and students at a kindergarten in Meihekou, Jilin, killing a six-year-old girl and wounding 15 other students and a teacher. Dong was shot and killed by police.

=== April 1996 ===
On April 1, 1996, Wang Xiangjun (王湘军), who was described as a mental patient, broke into two schools in Yizhang County, Hunan, stabbing seven students to death and injuring five others.

=== August 1998 ===
In late August 1998, a teacher fatally stabbed two children and injured 15 others in Henan.

=== September 1998 ===
On September 14, 1998, teacher and ex-soldier Lin Peiqing (林培青) wounded 23 students with kitchen knives, including eight children who were critically injured, at a primary school in Hejiang County, Sichuan during the morning Flag Raising Ceremony.

=== October 1999 ===
On October 19, 1999, a drunk school police officer Liang Yongcheng (梁永成) in Longzhou County, Guangxi, shot and wounded a teacher and six students with a hunting rifle before committing suicide.

== 2000s ==
=== March 2001 ===
On March 6, 2001, Li Chuicai (李垂才) allegedly broke into a third-grade classroom in Wanzai County, Jiangxi, and ignited explosives in a suicide bombing, destroying the school, killing 41 people and injuring 27.

=== February 2002 ===
On February 27, 2002, 38-year-old Huang Qiaoying stabbed a group of students from Baidu Primary School in Yongtai County, Fujian, while walking home after classes, killing three and wounding 11; she was arrested at the scene and found not guilty due to her mental illness.

=== September 2002 ===
On September 26, 2002, a bus driver from Lanzhou, Gansu, killed a teacher and wounded two others, including his ex-girlfriend, at a school with a hunting rifle. He was fatally shot by police after threatening suicide on the roof.

=== November 2002 ===
On November 24, 2002, Huang Hu placed rat poison in the table salt of a kindergarten in Wuchuan, Guangdong. Huang operated his own kindergarten that he had opened the previous month. His business failed quickly, and he blamed it on the kindergarten he targeted. 70 children and two teachers fell severely ill, though all of them survived. Huang was sentenced to death and executed on January 3, 2003.

==== Shilong stabbing ====
On November 26, 2002, a schizophrenic man named Shi Ruoqiu (施若丘) stabbed seven children at Shilong Elementary School in Huaiji County, Guangdong. Five of the children later died from their injuries.

=== January 2003 ===
On January 25, 2003, a teacher named Chen Peiquan (陈培全) fatally stabbed three students and a teacher at Yang Gan Middle School in Suixi County, Guangdong. Another three were injured. Chen had a history of mental illness and spent the previous six years in and out of mental hospitals.

=== February 2003 ===
On February 25, 2003, two blasts occurred at Tsinghua University and Peking University, each one separated by 90 minutes. Six were injured in Tsinghua, and three in Peking. Investigations revealed that the sources of the explosions were homemade bombs planted by 27-year-old farmer Huang Minxiang, who was motivated by a desire of notoriety. In March 2003, Huang was sentenced to life imprisonment.

=== March 2003 ===
On March 7, 2003, 24-year-old Xie Zhongcai (谢忠材) injured four teachers and four children with a knife at a kindergarten in Beihai, Guangxi, before being overpowered by the father of a child at the school. According to investigators, Xie was romantically rejected by a teacher at the school, and the teacher had arranged for him to be beaten up.

=== September 2003 ===
On September 13, 2003, 25-year-old Liang Mei returned to Guangxi Teachers' College in Nanning, who had suspended her for one year for attempting suicide. There she killed one student and injured seven other classmates by stabbing them in the back.

=== February 2004 ===
Between February 13 and 15, 2004, Ma Jiajue (马加爵), a biochemistry student at Yunnan University, killed four students with a hammer for accusing him of cheating in a card game.

=== August 2004 ===
On August 4, 2004, 15 students and three teachers were stabbed in a kindergarten at Peking University in Beijing. One student died in the hospital. The perpetrator, Xu Heping (徐和平), was a temporary worker at the kindergarten and was diagnosed with paranoid schizophrenia. He had been held at a mental hospital for four months in 1999 due to his illness, and was described as introverted and depressed.

=== September 2004 ===
==== Suzhou daycare stabbing ====
On September 11, 2004, 28 children were slashed after 41-year-old Yang Guozhu (杨国柱) broke into a daycare in Suzhou, Jiangsu. He was stopped by police as he was attempting to light gasoline and explosives in the building. Yang's parents had committed suicide by drinking poison in 2002. He claimed the attacks were a release of his frustration over family issues.

==== Ju County stabbing ====
On September 20, 2004, a man stabbed 25 students at No. 1 Experimental Primary School in Ju County, Shandong, before taking a female student hostage and being subdued by authorities.

==== Guangyi Centre School stabbing ====
On September 30, 2004, four children were killed and 16 others injured in a mass stabbing at Guangyi Centre School in Linwu County, Hunan. The perpetrator, 28-year-old Liu Hongwen (刘红文), was a teacher at the school with mental health issues. During his trial he was diagnosed with schizophrenia and found not guilty by reason of insanity.

=== October 2004 ===
On October 21, 2004, Fu Hegong (付贺功) broke into a kindergarten in Beijing with the intent to rob it. After being confronted by a teacher, he raped and smothered her to death with a quilt. After a five-year-old boy was awakened by the noise, he beat the boy to death. Fu had previously committed three unrelated murders and was executed for his crimes in 2005.

=== November 2004 ===
On November 25, 2004, 21-year-old Yan Yanming (闫彦明) entered Ruzhou No. 2 High School and fatally stabbed nine boys as they slept in their dormitory. He later attempted suicide and was turned over to authorities by his mother. He was executed on January 18, 2005.

=== December 2004 ===
On December 3, 2004, 12 students were stabbed by 30-year-old Liu Zhigang (刘志刚) at Central Primary School in Mingcheng Town, Panshi, Jilin. He scaled the school's fence, attacked students with a kitchen knife, and slashed his own throat. He and his victims all survived. After the attack Liu was placed in a mental hospital due to his severe schizophrenia.

=== April 2005 ===
On April 2, 2005, a man surnamed Meng broke into a classroom at Nansan Middle School in Zhanjiang, Guangdong, and inuring eight students with a kitchen knife. After a standoff with police, he attempted suicide by jumping off the building, but survived. Meng was a carpenter who had been recently fired from his job.

=== July 2005 ===
On July 7, 2005, 38-year-old Feng Liying, a woman with a history of mental illness, attacked a group of children who were playing in front of their school after classes with a knife. Three were injured and a fourth escaped by entering the school. The woman was arrested and sent to a psychiatric hospital for treatment.

=== October 2005 ===
On October 12, 2005, 33-year-old Liu Shibing (刘世斌) a former mental patient, opened fire with six homemade guns at Niutoushan Primary School in Liudong Town, Guangde, Anhui. Eighteen people were wounded (sixteen students and two adults). Liu fled the scene, but was arrested on October 14 in Beijing. At the time of the crime, he was unemployed and unmarried, and had a history of both criminal activity and mental disorders. Two years prior, he had burnt down his mother's home after she refused to give him money to buy cigarettes. Previous to the shooting, he had expressed jealousy towards people who had children, allegedly saying, "I have no kids of my own, so I will get rid of other people's kids".

=== May 2006 ===
==== Shiguan kindergarten attack ====
On May 8, 2006, 18-year-old Bai Ningyang (白宁阳) entered a classroom of a kindergarten in Shiguan Village, Gongyi, Henan. He forced the teacher and children to the back of the room at knifepoint, locked the door and poured gasoline on the floor, setting the room alight before escaping. 12 died and five others were seriously injured. According to locals, the teacher of the class had previously rejected his romantic advances. Bai was sentenced to death in December 2007.

On May 19, 2006, a 30-year-old woman from Hubei suspected of having mental illness stormed into a classroom of the Hekou Elementary School with a knife in Taihu, Anhui. Five students were injured, all of them non-fatally. The woman was arrested at the scene and sent to a psychiatric hospital for evaluation. Hours previous to the attack she had injured her niece in her house.

==== Luoying hostage taking ====
On May 24, 2006, after a dispute with neighbors, 35-year-old Yang Xinlong (杨新龙) murdered his aunt with a kitchen knife in Luoying village in Dengzhou, Henan, before setting her house on fire. He then injured another neighbor, fled, and chased after his cousin, who ran into Luoying Primary School. Yang scaled the wall into the school and took 19 elementary school students hostage, blocking a classroom door with a table. During the event, he killed a 10-year-old girl and injuring a male student before being shot in the wrist by a sniper and was subdued by police.

=== May 2007 ===
On May 15, 2007, 17-year-old Wu Jianguo (吴建国) stabbed six of his classmates with a knife at a middle school in Maoming, Guangdong, killing two.

=== June 2007 ===
==== Longtang stabbing ====
On June 13, 2007, 42-year-old Su Qianxiao (苏千小) broke into Chiling Primary School in Longtang, Zhanjiang, Guangdong, and killed a nine-year-old boy with a kitchen knife and seriously wounded three others.

==== Fuzhou stabbing ====
On June 20, 2007, four students were injured, one critically, when a young man broke into a school in Fuzhou, Fujian, and began attacking them with a knife.

=== July 2007 ===
In July 2007, a mentally ill man attacked 18 children with a wrench at a school in Foshan, Guangdong. He entered a classroom and began striking the children on their heads. He fled the scene on a motorcycle and attempted suicide.

=== September 2007 ===
On September 9, 2007, 49-year-old Chen Zhengwei, a worker at Kunming No. 1 Middle School, stormed into the campus with a rented vehicle, hitting and injuring six people before stopping and attempting suicide by pouring gasoline on himself and drinking it. He was arrested at the scene and was later sentenced to life imprisonment.

On September 13, 2007, a mentally ill 28-year-old man threw five girls and one boy out of a window on the third floor of a primary school in Hengyang, Hunan, killing one.

=== February 2008 ===
On February 25, 2008, Chen Wenzhen (陈文真) broke into Leizhou No. 2 Middle School in Leizhou, Guangdong, and fatally stabbed two students and injured four others, after which he stabbed himself in the abdomen and jumped from the fifth floor, killing himself. The perpetrator was described as a "mentally disturbed" young man.

=== March 2009 ===
On March 2, 2009, 40-year-old Xu Ximei hacked two preschoolers to death with a kitchen knife at a primary school in Mazhan, Guangdong. A grandmother and three others at the school were also injured. Xu was reportedly mentally disabled.

=== June 2009 ===
On June 22, 2009, 66-year-old Li Shengguang poisoned the food of Lu Zhikun, the wife of the director of the Wenda Kindergarten, located in Huangshi, Hubei. However, the poisoned food mixed with that of the students, causing the death of one of them and leaving 20 others in the hospital. Li was arrested the following day.

== 2010s ==
=== March 2010 ===
On March 23, 2010, Zheng Minsheng (郑民生) 41, murdered eight children with a knife in an elementary school in Nanping, Fujian; The attack was widely reported in Chinese media (called 南平实验小学重大凶杀案), sparking fears of copycat crimes. Following a quick trial, Zheng Minsheng was executed about one month later on April 28. Media reported a history of mental health issues, but police stated that Zheng had no history of mental illness, contradicting earlier reports. Zheng said that he performed the attack after being turned down by a girl and suffering "unfair treatment" from the girl's wealthy family.

=== April 2010 ===
==== Xizhen stabbing ====
On April 13, at Xizhen Primary School in Hepu County, Guangxi, a mentally ill man killed an eight-year-old boy and an 80-year-old woman passerby, and injured five others people – two boys, aged seven and 12, a seven-year-old girl and a couple in their thirties. The knife-wielding suspect, Yang Jiaqin (杨家钦), aged 40, was detained.

==== Leizhou stabbing ====
On April 28, in Leizhou, Guangdong, Chen Kangbing, 33 (陈康炳) attacked Leicheng First Primary School, and wounded 16 students and a teacher. Chen Kangbing had been a teacher at a different primary school (Hongfu Primary School) in Leizhou, but was on sick leave due to mental illness. He was sentenced to death by a court in Zhanjiang in June. The attack had taken place just a few hours after the execution of Zheng Minsheng.

==== Zhongxin stabbing ====
On April 29 in Taixing, Jiangsu, 47-year-old unemployed man Xu Yuyuan (徐玉元) went to Zhongxin Kindergarten and stabbed 29 students and two teachers after stabbing the security guard; most of the Taixing students were four years old. On May 15, he was sentenced to death for "intentional homicide", despite no official reports on any injured students dying. Internet reports, however, claimed that an untold number of the children had died. He was executed on May 30.

==== Weifang hammer attack ====
On April 30, Wang Yonglai (王永来) used a hammer to inflict head injuries to preschool children in Weifang, Shandong, then used gasoline to commit suicide by self-immolation. He was motivated by the attempts of local authorities to tear down his newly built family home since it was built on farmland, which is illegal.

=== May 2010 ===
==== Shengshui Temple kindergarten attack ====
An attacker named Wu Huanming (吴焕明), 48, killed seven children and two adults and injured 11 others with a cleaver at the Shengshui Temple private kindergarten in Hanzhong, Shaanxi, on May 12, 2010; early reports were removed from the internet in China, for fear that mass coverage of such violence could provoke copycat attacks. The attacker later committed suicide at his house; he was the landlord of the school, and had been involved in an ongoing dispute with the school administrator about when the school would move out of the building.

==== Hainan knife attack ====
On May 19, 2010, at Hainan Institute of Science and Technology (海南科技职业学院), a vocational college in Haikou, Hainan, more than ten men charged into a dormitory wielding knives around 2:30 a.m.; after attacking the security guard and disabling security cameras, nine students were injured, one seriously. The local men attacked the dorm in an act of revenge and retaliation against college students following conflict the previous day at an off-campus food stall in which four students were injured, for a total of 13.

=== August 2010 ===
On August 4, 2010, 26-year-old Fang Jiantang (方建堂) slashed more than 20 children and staff with a 60 cm knife at a kindergarten in Zibo, Shandong, killing three children and one teacher. Of the injured, three other children and four teachers were taken to a hospital. After being caught, Fang confessed to the crime. There was no known motive.

=== August 2011 ===
Eight children, between the ages of three and five, were injured in Minhang District, Shanghai, when an employee at a child-care centre for migrant workers slashed the children with a box-cutter. The woman had worked there for years, but was thought to have psychiatric problems.

=== September 2011 ===
In September 2011, a young girl and three adults taking their children to nursery school were killed in Gongyi, Henan by 30-year-old Wang Hongbin (王宏斌) with an axe. Another child and an adult were seriously wounded but survived. Hongbin is a local farmer who is suspected of being mentally ill.

=== September 2012 ===
==== Guangxi Zhuang nursery stabbing ====
On September 21, 2012, three children died and 13 more were injured after a suspected mental patient allegedly broke into a nursery in Pingnan County, Guangxi, and attacked students with a knife. The suspect, Wu Yechang, aged 25, was caught on-site by police officers, who rushed to the nursery after receiving emergency calls.

==== Henan College break-in ====
On September 25, 2012, a 20-year-old man surnamed Zhang broke into a girls' dormitory in the Henan Vocational and Technical College in Zhengzhou, killing three students and wounding another. He was later arrested.

=== December 2012 ===
==== Chenpeng Village Primary School stabbing ====
On December 14, 2012, 36-year-old Min Yongjun stabbed 23 children and an elderly woman in Wenshu, Henan, at Chenpeng village's primary school as children were arriving for classes. The attacker was restrained at the school, and later arrested. All of the victims survived and were treated at three hospitals, though some were reportedly seriously injured, with fingers or ears cut off, and had to be transferred to larger hospitals for specialized care.

==== Fengning vehicle-ramming attack ====
On December 24, 2012, thirteen students were injured after a 48-year-old man drove into them outside Fengning No. 1 Middle School in Fengning, Hebei. The suspect, Yin Tiejun, who had a gas tank and firecrackers, tried to set his car on fire but failed and was arrested. Yin told police he was upset over a court ruling in the murder of his daughter three years earlier.

=== March 2013 ===
==== Shanghai stabbings ====
A knife-wielding attacker killed two relatives and then slashed 11 people, including six children, outside a school in Shanghai. The man, whose surname was given as Zang, killed his sister and her mother-in-law at their home in a family dispute over money. Zang then attacked parents and children outside an elementary school in the suburban district of Fengxian just as classes were let out.

==== Yulin City school beating ====
Two boys died after they were beaten by a member of staff at a private primary school in Yulin City, Guangxi.

=== September 2013 ===
Two adults were killed and 44 others were injured after a homemade explosive detonated outside Balijie Primary School in Guilin, Guangxi. Most of the injured were schoolchildren. One of those killed was the bomber, who was riding his motorcycle during the explosion.

=== May 2014 ===
On May 20, 2014, a man armed with a meat cleaver slashed eight children on a playground located within the Macheng school in Hubei. Eight students were injured; one seriously, suffering major blood loss, with the other seven sustaining minor injuries. The perpetrator, identified as 35-year-old Chen Zuihang (陈最杭), was arrested without incident. Chen had a history of drug usage (being previously arrested for said crime in 2006 and 2011), and tested positive for methamphetamine in a urine test taken right after the incident.

=== September 2014 ===
On September 1, a man, identified by his surname Chen, broke into Dongfang Primary School in Shiyan, Hubei, around 10:20 in the morning. Wielding a knife, the man stabbed eight students and a teacher, killing three of the students, before committing suicide.

The same month, on September 26, four children were stabbed to death as they were walking to their school in Lingshan County, Guangxi. The 56-year-old suspect, Shi Jiangting (石健廷), who chased the children with a fruit knife, fled the scene on his rickshaw. Several days later, on October 9, his decomposed body was found hanging in the nearby mountains after committing suicide.

=== March 2015 ===
On March 18, 2015, a student stabbed three of his classmates, two boys and a girl, at Shouchang Middle School in Jiande City, Zhejiang; their injuries were not life-threatening. The attack took place during nap time, and the perpetrator jumped out of a window before later being treated at a hospital.

=== February 2016 ===
On February 29, 45-year-old Li Sijun injured ten schoolchildren (six boys and four girls) at Yangfan Primary School (扬帆小学) in Haikou, Hainan, by stabbing them with a knife before escaping and committing suicide. The motive for the attack is unclear.

Later that same day, a man deliberately drove his jeep into the campus of Nanyang No. 1 Middle School in Henan, injuring 6 students who were leaving class, before driving off school grounds onto another group of students, hitting another 6, one fatally. The driver, Ma Gaochao, was arrested that same day. He was a retired prosecuting lawyer and member of the Chinese Communist Party. His motive had apparently been seeking revenge on society as he was caught up in a business dispute. Ma was charged with endangering public safety and sentenced to death in July 2017.

=== November 2016 ===
On November 25, at around 11:40 a.m. 58-year-old Lei Mingyue (雷明跃) entered an after-school care center in Hantai District, Shaanxi, and attacked students lining up for lunch with an axe. After wounding seven female students from Beiguan Primary School he fled the premises, injuring two passersby during his escape. He was later arrested by police and stated that he carried out the attack as revenge on society after he was arrested twice for theft.

=== March 2017 ===
On March 28, 2017, in Yuncheng, Shaanxi, Chai Qingkui, a man suspected of having mental problems, stormed into an elementary school and attacked children with a knife, one student was killed and an unknown number of persons injured. The perpetrator escaped and was arrested on the same day.

=== May 2017 ===
A driver angry over the loss of his overtime pay set fire to his school bus in the city of Weihai, Shandong, killing all 13 people aboard the bus, including 11 children from China and South Korea, the driver himself and a teacher. The driver ignited gasoline, which he had bought earlier, while the bus was travelling through a tunnel in Weihai that is home to many South Korean businesses. Police determined that the fire started on the floor of the bus next to the driver's seat, where the cap to a cigarette lighter and gasoline residue were found.

=== June 2017 ===
On June 15, 2017, a bombing at a kindergarten in Feng County, Xuzhou, Jiangsu, killed at least eight people and injured 65 others. The perpetrator, 22-year-old Xu Taoran, died in the blast. Subsequent investigation revealed that Xu had been mentally ill and was obsessed with death and destruction. The blast occurred at the entrance of the kindergarten, while children were leaving school. Two people died on the spot, and five succumbed to injuries at the hospital. Nine remained in critical condition in the aftermath. Due to the shattering bomb parts, over 60 people were injured and needed medical attention.

=== April 2018 ===
Nine people were killed and 12 were injured in a stabbing outside No. 3 Middle School in Mizhi County, Shaanxi. The attack was allegedly carried out by a former pupil seeking revenge for having been bullied. The perpetrator was sentenced to death and executed in September 2018.

=== June 2018 ===
On June 28, outside Shanghai World Foreign Language Primary School, one of the best private elementary schools in the city, a man attacked three schoolboys and a mother with a kitchen knife, fatally wounding two boys and injuring the others. The attacker, 29, was caught by pedestrians at the scene. Unemployed, he arrived in Shanghai in early June but failed to find a job. He reportedly committed the crime to "take revenge on society," the man told the police.

=== October 2018 ===
A knife-wielding assailant injured 14 children at a kindergarten in Chongqing. The attacker, a 39-year-old woman, was taken into custody. No motive for the assault was immediately publicized.

=== January 2019 ===
On January 8, a 49-year-old man surnamed Jia was arrested after attacking 20 children at Beijing No. 1 Affiliated Elementary School of Xuanwu Normal School with a hammer. Three of the children suffered severe injuries. The perpetrator was identified as a worker at the school and his work contract had not been renewed, giving a motive to his attack.

=== March 2019 ===
On the afternoon of March 14, 2019, 54-year-old Cui Zhenjiang (崔振江) attacked students near the Guanghuadao Primary School in Tangshan, Hebei, injuring 17 students.

=== September 2019 ===
On September 2, 2019, a 40-year-old attacker surnamed Yu killed eight students and injured two others at an elementary school in Chaoyangpo, Enshi City, Hubei, on the first day of the new semester. The motive and method of the attack were not specified. The suspect was previously released from prison in June 2018 after serving a sentence for attempted murder.

=== November 2019 ===
More than 50 people, almost all of them young children, were hospitalized in Kaiyuan, Yunnan, after a man broke into a kindergarten and sprayed them with sodium hydroxide as "revenge on society." Fifty-one children and three teachers were injured, including two seriously injured, but not life-threatening.

== 2020s ==
=== June 2020 ===
On June 4, 2020, 39 people (37 students and two adults) were injured in a knife attack at a primary school. The students suffered mild injuries; two adults suffered more severe injuries. The perpetrator, school security guard Li Xiaowen, was motivated personal resentments against colleagues and the vice principal. He was sentenced to death in September 2020.

=== April 2021 ===
On April 28, 2021, a knife-wielding man broke into a school, killing two children and wounding 16 others. The mass stabbing occurred in Beiliu, Guangxi. A man with the surname Zeng, aged 24, was apprehended by police. Authorities did not confirm a motive for the attack, but Hong Kong news outlets, including Oriental Daily and Apple Daily, reported that the suspect was going through a divorce and his wife worked at the school.

=== August 2022 ===
On August 3, 2022, four people were killed and five others wounded in a knife attack at a kindergarten in Anfu County, Jiangxi. The suspect, identified as 48-year-old Liu Xiaohui (刘小辉), fled to a mountainous area in neighboring Wan'an County after the attack and was arrested 12 hours later during a foot chase in which he was seriously injured after being hit by a car. Despite efforts to save him, Liu died in the hospital hours later on August 4.

=== April 2023 ===
At 5:00 p.m. on April 19, 2023, a mentally unstable student allegedly stabbed seven people at the Qingdao Campus of Shandong University of Science and Technology with a knife, killing one. He was subsequently arrested.

=== May 2023 ===
On May 14, 2023, a sophomore of the High School Affiliated to Renmin University of China allegedly stabbed two of his neighbours to death and severely injured his mother by beating her into a coma. The following day, he went to the Tongzhou campus of his school, where he allegedly stabbed three people, including the vice-principal, who is suspected dead.

=== July 2023 ===
On July 10, 2023, six people were killed and one wounded in a mass stabbing at a kindergarten in Lianjiang, Guangdong. The suspect, a 25-year-old man with the surname Wu, was arrested by police.

=== May 2024 ===
On May 20, 2024, a woman stabbed twelve people with a fruit knife at a primary school in Guixi, Jiangxi, killing two. The suspect, a 45-year-old woman surnamed Pan, was arrested at the scene.

=== October 2024 ===
At around 3:20 p.m. near the intersection of Wanquanzhuang Road and Wanliu Zhong Road in Beijing, close to Zhongguancun No. 3 Primary School, an attacker injured five people, three of them minors. The attacker was reportedly arrested at the scene. The injured were reported to be in a stable condition. The alleged attacker, a 50-year-old man surnamed Tang, was arrested and is currently under investigation by the Chinese authorities.

=== November 2024 ===
==== Wuxi stabbing attack ====
On November 16, 2024, eight people were killed and 17 others injured in a stabbing attack on the Wuxi Vocational Institute of Arts and Technology college campus in Yixing, Jiangsu. The suspect, a 21-year-old student surnamed Xu, was arrested at the scene.

==== Changde vehicle-ramming attack ====
On November 19, 2024, 39-year-old Huang Wen drove into students and pedestrians outside a primary school in Changde, Hunan, as students were arriving to school. 30 people were injured, including 18 students. Huang was arrested at the scene and later sentenced to death with a two-year reprieve.

=== April 2025 ===
On April 22, 2025, a woman drove into pedestrians at the gate of Sumeng Township Central Primary School in Jinhua, Zhejiang, killing between seven and fourteen people, most of whom were students.

=== June 2025 ===
On June 4, 2025, a stabbing was reported at Wuhan University in Wuhan, Hubei. A 23-year-old student surnamed Zhu attacked three people in the university cafeteria. No one was seriously injured, and Zhu was detained.

=== August 2025 ===
On August 3, 2025, at around 6 p.m., a man perpetrated a knife attack near a primary school in Leiyang, Hunan, where two people were killed and three more were injured. The suspect, 31-year-old Duan Chao, was arrested.

=== October 2025 ===
At approximately 5:30 pm on October 22, 2025, a 48-year-old man surnamed Chen rammed his car into citizens at the entrance of Chongqing Road Primary School in Shiyan, Hubei, injuring at least 10 people.

== See also ==
- Lists of school-related attacks
- Crime in China
- Social issues in China
