= Mount Jigong =

Mountain in Xinyang, China

- Location within Henan Location within Eastern China

Highest point
- Coordinates: 31°48′13″N 114°05′05″E

Geography
- Location: Shihe District, Xinyang, Henan
- Parent range: Dabie Mountains

Mount Jigong (simplified Chinese: 鸡公山; traditional Chinese: 雞公山; pinyin: Jīgōng Shān) is a mountain in Shihe District, Xinyang, Henan Province, China, located near the border with Hubei Province to the south. The name, which means Rooster Mountain or Cockerel Mountain, is derived from its shape.

It used to be a summer retreat for Western missionaries and, later, for Communist officials. From 1898 to 1936, over 300 villas of various styles were built on the mountain by foreign missionaries of different countries, and the area became a famed summer resort. It is 38 km from downtown Xinyang.

== Climate ==
Mount Jigong has a humid subtropical climate (Köppen climate classification Cwa).

Climate data for Mount Jigong, elevation 734 m (2,408 ft), (1991–2020 normals, extremes 1981–present)
Month	Jan	Feb	Mar	Apr	May	Jun	Jul	Aug	Sep	Oct	Nov	Dec	Year
Record high °C (°F)	15.2 (59.4)	21.1 (70.0)	25.8 (78.4)	28.6 (83.5)	32.2 (90.0)	33.9 (93.0)	34.5 (94.1)	33.9 (93.0)	32.1 (89.8)	29.1 (84.4)	23.7 (74.7)	17.4 (63.3)	34.5 (94.1)
Mean daily maximum °C (°F)	3.7 (38.7)	6.5 (43.7)	11.6 (52.9)	18.1 (64.6)	22.3 (72.1)	25.3 (77.5)	27.2 (81.0)	26.6 (79.9)	23.0 (73.4)	18.2 (64.8)	12.2 (54.0)	6.1 (43.0)	16.7 (62.1)
Daily mean °C (°F)	0.1 (32.2)	2.5 (36.5)	7.2 (45.0)	13.3 (55.9)	18.1 (64.6)	21.5 (70.7)	23.7 (74.7)	23.0 (73.4)	19.1 (66.4)	14.3 (57.7)	8.3 (46.9)	2.4 (36.3)	12.8 (55.0)
Mean daily minimum °C (°F)	−2.4 (27.7)	−0.1 (31.8)	4.0 (39.2)	9.8 (49.6)	14.8 (58.6)	18.6 (65.5)	21.3 (70.3)	20.5 (68.9)	16.3 (61.3)	11.4 (52.5)	5.4 (41.7)	−0.2 (31.6)	10.0 (49.9)
Record low °C (°F)	−13.1 (8.4)	−13.6 (7.5)	−7.3 (18.9)	−3.7 (25.3)	4.0 (39.2)	7.7 (45.9)	14.6 (58.3)	10.6 (51.1)	6.0 (42.8)	−0.5 (31.1)	−11.7 (10.9)	−13.6 (7.5)	−13.6 (7.5)
Average precipitation mm (inches)	42.2 (1.66)	50.9 (2.00)	79.0 (3.11)	102.7 (4.04)	138.3 (5.44)	185.6 (7.31)	258.4 (10.17)	188.8 (7.43)	90.6 (3.57)	86.7 (3.41)	54.5 (2.15)	29.3 (1.15)	1,307 (51.44)
Average precipitation days (≥ 0.1 mm)	8.4	9.7	11.2	11.0	12.3	11.8	13.5	13.9	11.3	10.6	9.3	7.1	130.1
Average snowy days	7.7	5.4	2.8	0.3	0	0	0	0	0	0.1	1.6	4.3	22.2
Average relative humidity (%)	66	69	70	70	73	81	87	87	79	69	66	63	73
Mean monthly sunshine hours	138.2	131.2	161.5	184.4	190.2	175.7	189.4	182.7	162.6	166.5	158.4	150.6	1,991.4
Percentage possible sunshine	43	42	43	47	44	41	44	45	44	48	51	48	45
Source: China Meteorological Administration
