= Xinyang Agriculture and Forestry University =

Agricultural college in Xinyang, Henan, China

- 信阳农林外网
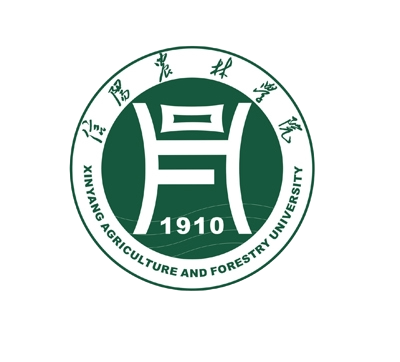
- Seal of Xinyang Agriculture and Forestry University
- Type: College, Public
- Established: 1910
- President: Jian Cao
- Administrative staff: 1,134
- Students: 17,000
- Location: Xinyang, China
- Campus: 296.5 acres (120.0 ha); Urban
- Website: Official Website of XYAFU

Xinyang Agriculture and Forestry University
- Traditional Chinese: 信陽農林學院
- Simplified Chinese: 信阳农林学院
- Literal meaning: Xinyang College of Agriculture and Forestry
Transcriptions
Standard Mandarin
- Hanyu Pinyin: Xìnyáng nónglín xuéyuàn

Xinyang Agriculture and Forestry University (XYAFU) is a university located in Xinyang City, in the southern part of Henan Province, Central China. It was established in 1910 as the Runing-fu Industrial School.

== History ==
Xinyang Agriculture and Forestry University was founded in Runan County, Zhumadian, Henan, in 1910 as the Runing-fu Industrial School (汝寧府中等實業學堂, Rǔnìngfǔ zhōngděng shíyè xuétáng). The school moved to Xinyang City after 1949, and its name was changed to the Xinyang Agricultural School in 1958. In 1992, the Ministry of Education of the People's Republic of China renamed it the Xinyang Agricultural College. In 2013, the institution gained university status, becoming the Xinyang Agriculture and Forestry University.

Today, the university is most well-known for its School of Tea Science, which has long had a close relationship with the development and cultivation of Xinyang Maojian tea. It is also home to the Journal of Xinyang Agriculture and Forestry University, a peer-reviewed academic journal that publishes research in fields related to agriculture and forestry.

== Departments ==
The university is divided into 17 schools, listed below. Of these, the schools of Agronomy, Forestry, Animal Science and Veterinary Medicine, Tea Science, Fisheries, and Horticulture fall under the Faculty of Agriculture. The other schools have separate faculties.

- School of Pharmaceutical Engineering
- School of Logistics & E-Commerce
- School of Tourism Management
- School of Forestry
- School of Horticulture
- School of Information Engineering
- School of Foreign Languages
- School of Physical Education
- School of Fisheries
- School of Food Science and Technology
- School of Agronomy
- School of Animal Science and Veterinary Medicine
- School of Marxism
- School of Planning and Design
- School of Business Administration
- School of Tea Science
- School of Finance and Economics

== See also ==
- http://www.chinatefl.com/henan/teach/xyny.htm Teach in Henan, China - Welcome to XAC.
