= Huaibin County =

Huaibin County 淮滨县
- County
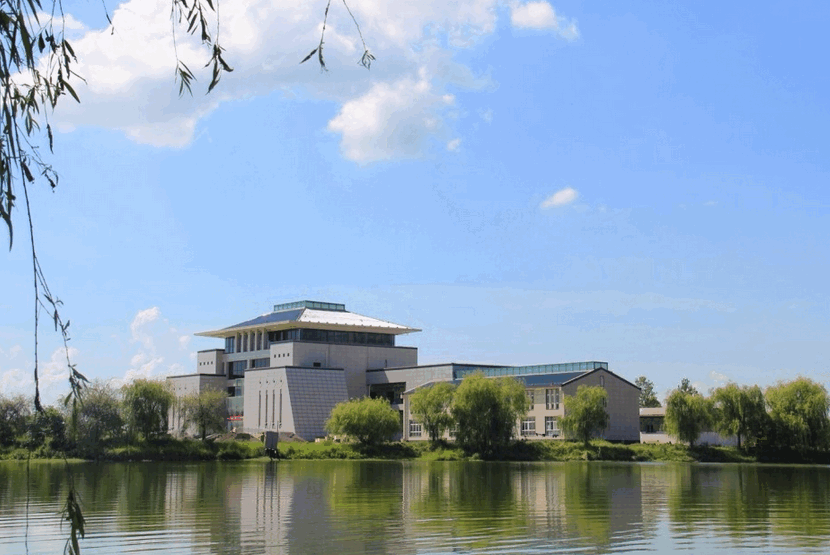
- Huaihe Museum

- Location of the seat in Henan
- Coordinates: 32.473°N 115.420°E
- Country: People's Republic of China
- Province: Henan
- Prefecture-level city: Xinyang

Area
  - Total: 1,192 km^{2} (460 sq mi)

Population (2019)
  - Total: 569,500
  - Density: 477.8/km^{2} (1,237/sq mi)
- Time zone: UTC+8 (China Standard)
- Postal code: 464400

Huaibin County (simplified Chinese: 淮滨县; traditional Chinese: 淮濱縣; pinyin: Huáibīn Xiàn) is a county in the southeast of Henan province, China, bordering Anhui province to the northeast. Situated along the Huai River (Huaihe), it is under the administration of Xinyang city.

== Administrative divisions ==
As of 2012, this county is divided to 5 towns and 5 townships.

Towns

- Chengguan (城关镇)
- Langan (栏杆镇)
- Fanghu (防胡镇)
- Xinli (新里镇)
- Maji (马集镇)
- Qisi (期思镇)
- Zhaoji (赵集镇)

Townships

- Taitou Township (台头乡)
- Wangjiagang Township (王家岗乡)
- Gucheng Township (固城乡)
- Sankongqiao Township (三空桥乡)
- Zhangli Township (张里乡)
- Luji Township (芦集乡)
- Dengwan Township (邓湾乡)
- Zhangzhuang Township (张庄乡)
- Wangdian Township (王店乡)
- Gudui Township (谷堆乡)

== Climate ==
Climate data for Huaibin, elevation 35 m (115 ft), (1991–2020 normals, extremes 1981–present)
Month	Jan	Feb	Mar	Apr	May	Jun	Jul	Aug	Sep	Oct	Nov	Dec	Year
Record high °C (°F)	21.6 (70.9)	28.2 (82.8)	35.4 (95.7)	33.7 (92.7)	37.1 (98.8)	39.2 (102.6)	40.7 (105.3)	38.2 (100.8)	38.1 (100.6)	38.5 (101.3)	28.8 (83.8)	22.5 (72.5)	40.7 (105.3)
Mean daily maximum °C (°F)	6.9 (44.4)	10.2 (50.4)	15.7 (60.3)	22.2 (72.0)	27.2 (81.0)	30.1 (86.2)	32.2 (90.0)	31.3 (88.3)	27.6 (81.7)	22.6 (72.7)	15.9 (60.6)	9.3 (48.7)	20.9 (69.7)
Daily mean °C (°F)	2.4 (36.3)	5.4 (41.7)	10.4 (50.7)	16.6 (61.9)	21.8 (71.2)	25.6 (78.1)	28.0 (82.4)	27.0 (80.6)	22.6 (72.7)	17.2 (63.0)	10.6 (51.1)	4.6 (40.3)	16.0 (60.8)
Mean daily minimum °C (°F)	−1.0 (30.2)	1.5 (34.7)	6.1 (43.0)	11.6 (52.9)	17.1 (62.8)	21.7 (71.1)	24.6 (76.3)	23.6 (74.5)	18.7 (65.7)	12.9 (55.2)	6.5 (43.7)	1.0 (33.8)	12.0 (53.7)
Record low °C (°F)	−18.5 (−1.3)	−13.4 (7.9)	−4.7 (23.5)	0.1 (32.2)	5.6 (42.1)	12.8 (55.0)	17.5 (63.5)	14.6 (58.3)	7.5 (45.5)	1.3 (34.3)	−7.6 (18.3)	−15.8 (3.6)	−18.5 (−1.3)
Average precipitation mm (inches)	32.5 (1.28)	37.0 (1.46)	63.8 (2.51)	65.6 (2.58)	102.0 (4.02)	163.0 (6.42)	210.5 (8.29)	129.9 (5.11)	65.2 (2.57)	60.7 (2.39)	45.9 (1.81)	25.8 (1.02)	1,001.9 (39.46)
Average precipitation days (≥ 0.1 mm)	7.0	7.6	8.3	7.8	10.1	9.3	11.3	11.4	8.7	7.9	7.6	6.2	103.2
Average snowy days	4.9	3.0	1.2	0	0	0	0	0	0	0	0.7	1.8	11.6
Average relative humidity (%)	73	72	69	70	72	77	82	84	80	74	73	71	75
Mean monthly sunshine hours	102.3	105.7	142.6	171.7	173.8	166.2	174.9	162.5	139.5	134.4	127.8	116.3	1,717.7
Percentage possible sunshine	32	34	38	44	41	39	40	40	38	39	41	38	39
Source: China Meteorological Administration
