= Guangshan County =

Guangshan County 光山县
- County
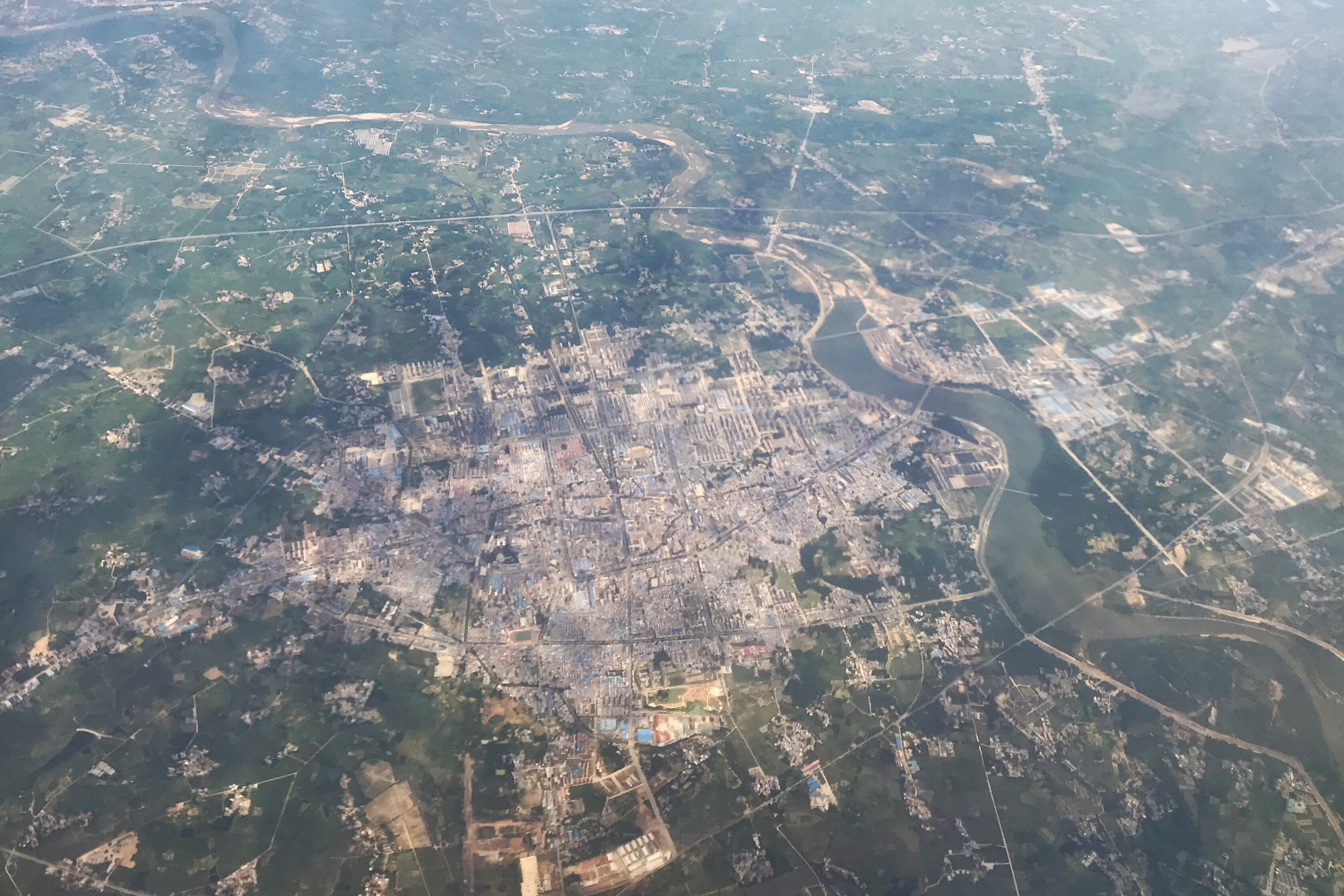
- Aerial view of Guangshan County

- Location of the seat in Henan
- Coordinates: 32°00′N 114°54′E
- Country: People's Republic of China
- Province: Henan
- Prefecture-level city: Xinyang

Area
  - Total: 1,829 km^{2} (706 sq mi)

Population (2019)
  - Total: 608,900
  - Density: 332.9/km^{2} (862.2/sq mi)
- Time zone: UTC+8 (China Standard)
- Postal code: 465450
- Area code: 0376
- Website: http://www.guangshan.gov.cn/

Guangshan County (Chinese: 光山; pinyin: Guāngshān; postal: Kwangshan) is a county in the southeast of Henan province, China. It is under the administration of Xinyang city. The regional dialect is the Xinyang city dialect of Southwestern Mandarin.

The 13th five-year plan of Xinyang city puts forward the concept of "integration of decoration and light", accelerates the integrated development of Huangchuan and Guangshan counties, constructs the sub central city of the city area, and supports the withdrawal of counties into cities.

== Administrative divisions ==
As of 2012, this county is divided to 2 subdistricts, 7 towns and 10 townships.

Subdistricts

- Xianshan Subdistrict (弦山街道)
- Zishui Subdistrict (紫水街道)

Towns

- Suntiepu (孙铁铺镇)
- Pobeihe (泼陂河镇)
- Baique (白雀镇)
- Shilimiao (十里庙镇)
- Mafan (马畈镇)
- Zhuanqiao (砖桥镇)
- Zhaihe (寨河镇)

Townships

- Yanhe Township (晏河乡)
- Huaidian Township (槐店乡)
- Yinpeng Township (殷棚乡)
- Wenshu Township (文殊乡)
- Xianju Township (仙居乡)
- Beixiangdian Township (北向店乡)
- Nanxiangdian Township (南向店乡)
- Luochen Township (罗陈乡)
- Hushan Township (斛山乡)
- Liangting Township (凉亭乡)

== Climate ==
Climate data for Guangshan, elevation 49 m (161 ft), (1991–2020 normals, extremes 1981–present)
Month	Jan	Feb	Mar	Apr	May	Jun	Jul	Aug	Sep	Oct	Nov	Dec	Year
Record high °C (°F)	21.6 (70.9)	27.5 (81.5)	35.2 (95.4)	34.0 (93.2)	36.4 (97.5)	37.0 (98.6)	38.8 (101.8)	38.3 (100.9)	37.3 (99.1)	34.8 (94.6)	29.2 (84.6)	22.8 (73.0)	38.8 (101.8)
Mean daily maximum °C (°F)	7.1 (44.8)	10.4 (50.7)	15.8 (60.4)	22.3 (72.1)	26.9 (80.4)	29.8 (85.6)	32.0 (89.6)	31.2 (88.2)	27.6 (81.7)	22.5 (72.5)	15.9 (60.6)	9.6 (49.3)	20.9 (69.7)
Daily mean °C (°F)	2.3 (36.1)	5.4 (41.7)	10.5 (50.9)	16.7 (62.1)	21.8 (71.2)	25.4 (77.7)	27.8 (82.0)	26.9 (80.4)	22.7 (72.9)	16.9 (62.4)	10.3 (50.5)	4.4 (39.9)	15.9 (60.7)
Mean daily minimum °C (°F)	−1.2 (29.8)	1.5 (34.7)	6.0 (42.8)	11.8 (53.2)	17.2 (63.0)	21.7 (71.1)	24.6 (76.3)	23.8 (74.8)	18.9 (66.0)	12.7 (54.9)	6.1 (43.0)	0.6 (33.1)	12.0 (53.6)
Record low °C (°F)	−17.2 (1.0)	−13.0 (8.6)	−4.5 (23.9)	−0.2 (31.6)	6.4 (43.5)	12.6 (54.7)	17.9 (64.2)	15.1 (59.2)	9.8 (49.6)	1.3 (34.3)	−7.6 (18.3)	−16.5 (2.3)	−17.2 (1.0)
Average precipitation mm (inches)	35.0 (1.38)	41.9 (1.65)	67.7 (2.67)	86.2 (3.39)	112.6 (4.43)	162.1 (6.38)	216.5 (8.52)	136.9 (5.39)	72.8 (2.87)	70.4 (2.77)	48.9 (1.93)	26.6 (1.05)	1,077.6 (42.43)
Average precipitation days (≥ 0.1 mm)	8.1	8.7	9.9	9.4	11.2	10.7	11.4	12.2	9.8	9.4	8.4	6.5	115.7
Average snowy days	5.3	3.4	1.1	0	0	0	0	0	0	0	0.7	1.7	12.2
Average relative humidity (%)	76	75	71	71	73	78	82	83	78	76	76	74	76
Mean monthly sunshine hours	119.9	120.6	156.5	185.2	191.8	187.8	202.4	185.5	159.5	156.5	145.9	133.5	1,945.1
Percentage possible sunshine	38	38	42	48	45	44	47	45	43	45	47	43	44
Source: China Meteorological Administration

== History ==
The famous historical figures born at Guangshan included Sima Guang (司马光, 1019–1086), Cai Yizhong (蔡毅中, 1567－1631), and Huxu (胡煦, 1655－1736).

During the Chinese Civil War, Guangshan county was at the heart of the Eyuwan Soviet (including the soviet capital). The Eyuwan Soviet included more than one million people in the border region between Hubei, Henan, and Anhui provinces and was the second-largest soviet in China.

== See also ==
- Chenpeng Village Primary School stabbing
- Wenshu Township

== Bibliography ==
- Benton, Gregor (1992). Mountain Fires: The Red Army's Three-year War in South China, 1934-1938. Los Angeles: University of California Press.
- Wou, Odoric (2022). Mobilizing the Masses: Building Revolution in Henan. Stanford: Stanford University Press.
