= Jingju Temple (Yiwu) =

Buddhist temple in Yiwu, China

- 净居寺
- Location within Zhejiang

Religion
- Affiliation: Buddhism
- Deity: Chan Buddhism

Location
- Location: Houzhai Subdistrict, Yiwu, Zhejiang
- Country: China
- Coordinates: 29°23′11″N 120°05′23″E

Architecture
- Style: Chinese architecture
- Founder: Shegong (涉公)
- Established: 867
- Completed: 1980s (reconstruction)

Jingju Temple (simplified Chinese: 净居寺; traditional Chinese: 凈居寺; pinyin: Jìngjū Sì) is a Buddhist temple located in Houzhai Subdistrict of Yiwu, Zhejiang, China.

== History ==
Jingju Temple was originally built by monk Shegong (涉公) in 867, under the Tang dynasty.

During the Dazhong Xiangfu period of Song dynasty, Emperor Zhenzong inscribed and honored the name "Jingju Temple" (净居院).

Over the course of 1,150 years, the temple was destroyed and rebuilt many times. Most of the present structures in the temple were repaired or built in the 1980s. The Buddhist temple status was approved in 1992 and religious activities were revived.

== Architecture ==
The temple was built along the up and down of mountains. Now the existing main buildings include Shanmen, Heavenly Kings Hall, Mahavira Hall, and the Buddhist Texts Library.
