= Wenshu Township =

Wenshu Township 文殊乡
- Township
- Location in Henan
- Coordinates: 31°55′20″N 114°46′27″E
- Country: People's Republic of China
- Province: Henan
- Prefecture-level city: Xinyang
- County: Guangshan
- Elevation: 78 m (256 ft)
- Time zone: UTC+8 (China Standard)
- Area code: 0376

Wenshu (Chinese: 文殊乡; pinyin: Wénshū Xiāng) is located in Guangshan County in southeastern Henan province, China. The name of "Wenshu, 文殊" comes from Buddhism (Manjushri). As of 2011, it has 1 residential community (街居委会) and 21 villages under its administration.

== See also ==
- List of township-level divisions of Henan
- Chenpeng Village Primary School stabbing
- Townships of the People's Republic of China
