= Jingju Temple (Ji'an) =

Buddhist temple in Jiangxi, China

- 净居寺
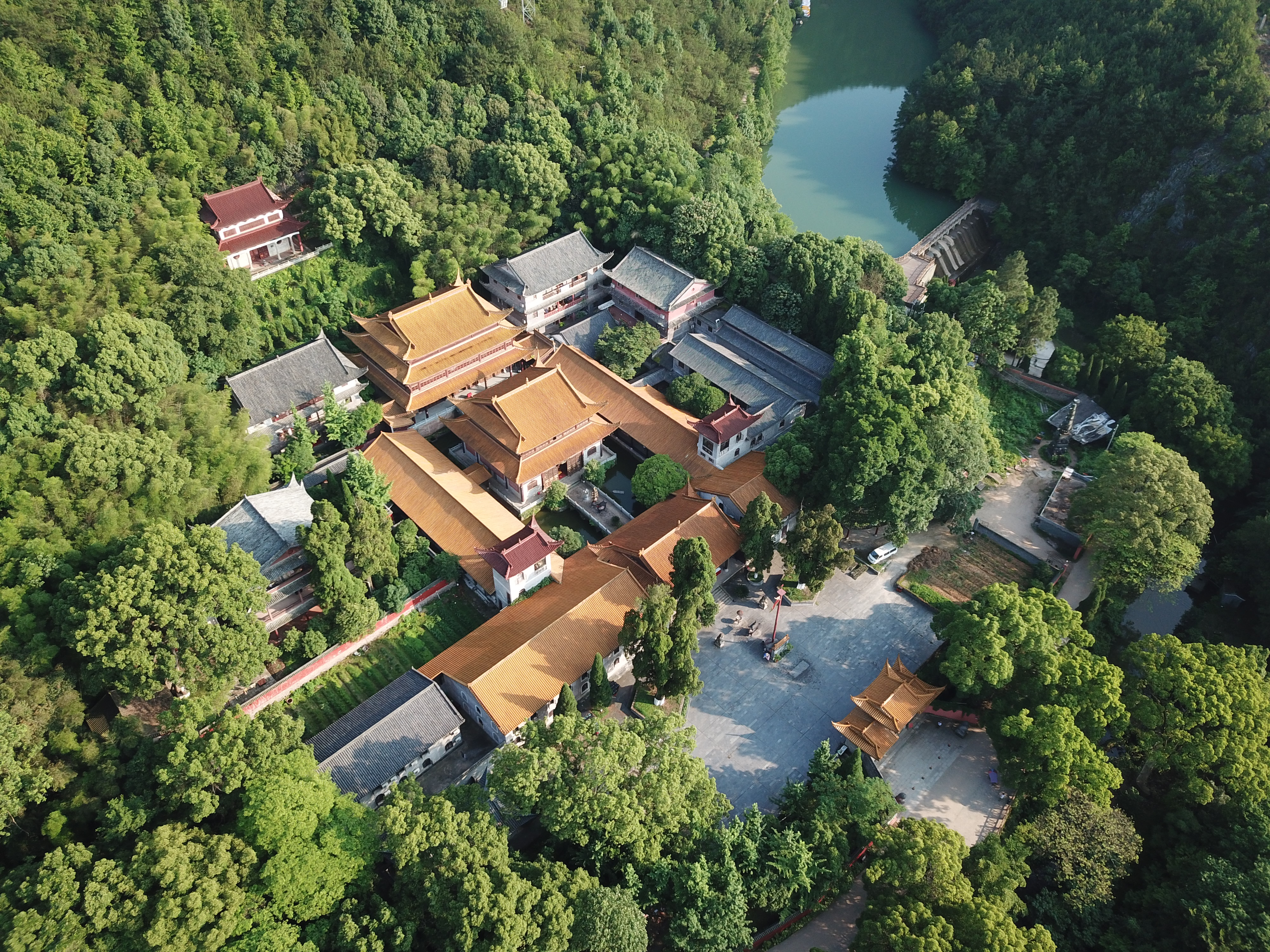
- Vertical view of Jingju Temple.

Religion
- Affiliation: Buddhism
- Sect: Chan Buddhism
- Leadership: Shi Miao'an (释妙安)

Location
- Location: Qingyuan District, Ji'an, Jiangxi
- Country: China
- Interactive map of Jingju Temple
- Coordinates: 27°03′49″N 115°03′34″E

Architecture
- Style: Chinese architecture
- Founder: Qingyuan Xingsi
- Established: 705
- Completed: 1984 (reconstruction)

Jingju Temple (simplified Chinese: 净居寺; traditional Chinese: 凈居寺; pinyin: Jìngjū Sì) is a Buddhist temple located on Mount Qingyuan, in Qingyuan District of Ji'an, Jiangxi, China.

== History ==
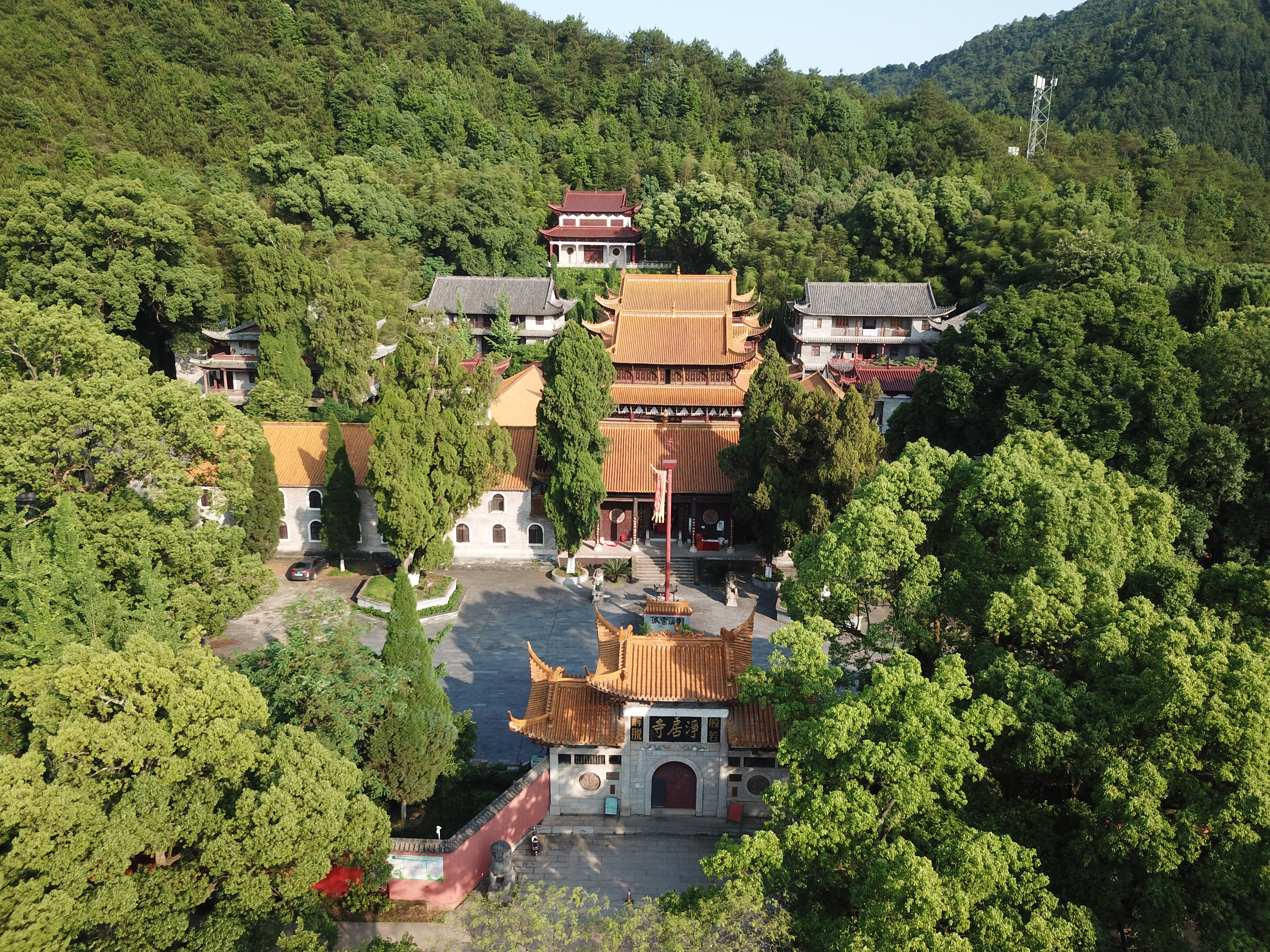
Jingju Temple on Mount Qingyuan.

=== Tang dynasty ===
Jingju Temple was first construction as "Anyin Temple" (安隐寺) in 705 by an accomplished Chan master Qingyuan Xingsi, under the Tang dynasty (618–907). Qingyuan Xingsi settled at Anyin Temple, where he promulgated Buddhist doctrines and disseminated Buddhism for more than 27 years, and attracted large numbers of practitioners.

In 749, after Jianzhen's east crossing failed, he lived here for a short time. He visited the Pagoda of Seventh Patriarch with Japanese monk Puzhao.

Since Emperor Wuzong (841–846) believed in Taoism, he ordered to demolish Buddhist temples, confiscate temple lands and force monks to return to secular life. Anyin Temple was completely destroyed in the massive movement which known as the "Great Anti-Buddhist Persecution".

The temple was rebuilt in 851, in the reign of Emperor Xuanzong (847–860).

=== Song dynasty ===
In 1066, in the 3rd year of Zhiping period (1064–1067) in the Song dynasty (960–1279), Emperor Yingzong inscribed and honored the name "Anyin Temple".

In 1104, Emperor Huizong renamed it "Jingju Temple", which is still in use now. At that time, the temple had reached unprecedented heyday with one thousand monks lived there.

=== Yuan dynasty ===
In the late Yuan dynasty (1271–1368), Jingju Temple was devastated by war, when Red Turban Rebellion fought against the Mongolian army.

=== Ming dynasty ===
In 1376, in the early Ming dynasty (1368–1644), Chan master Shigong (师巩) restored and redecorated the temple.

In 1514, in the ruling of Zhengde Emperor, Wang Yangming, an exceptional Neo-Confucianism philosopher and educator, often gave lectures here.

The temple went to ruin at the end of the Ming dynasty.

=== Qing dynasty ===
During the Shunzhi era (1644–1661) of the Qing dynasty (1644–1911), abbot Xiaofeng (笑峰) renovated the Pilu Hall (毗卢殿), Yanshou Hall (延寿殿) and Chuanxin Hall (传心殿), and compiled the Records of Qingyuan Mountains (清原山志).

=== Republic of China ===
During the Republic of China (1912–1949), abbot Gaoguang (高光) repaired and refurbished the temple.

=== People's Republic of China ===
After the establishment of the Communist State, the temple went into decline while the loss of government support.

In 1966, Mao Zedong launched the Cultural Revolution, the Red Guards had attacked the temple in this ten-year massive socialist movement, the temple was dilapidated with huge losses of the cultural relics.

Jingju Temple has been designated as a National Key Buddhist Temple in Han Chinese Area in 1983.

After the 3rd Plenary Session of the 11th Central Committee of the Chinese Communist Party, according to the national policy of free religious belief, Jingju Temple was officially reopened to the public in 1984. That same year, the local government has allocated CN¥2 million for the reconstruction project.

In the winter of 1990, Shi Tiguang (释体光) was unanimously chosen as new abbot of the temple.

In January 2014, the temple was listed among the second group of "National Religious Base for Patriotism Education".

== Architecture ==
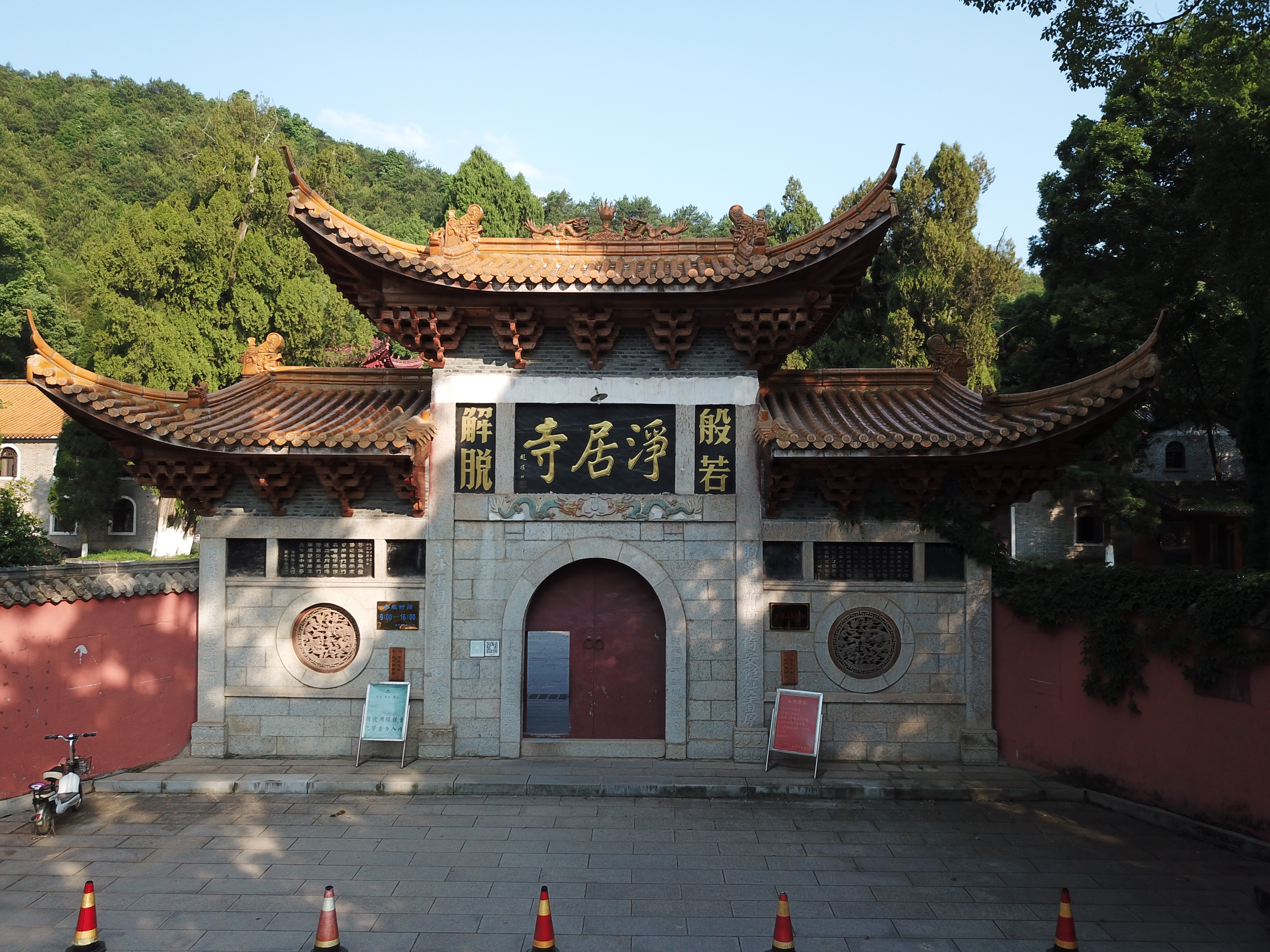
The Shanmen at Jingju Temple.

Along the central axis are the Shanmen, Four Heavenly Kings Hall, Mahavira Hall, Pilu Hall, Buddhist Texts Library, and the Pagoda of Seventh Patriarch.

=== Hall of Four Heavenly Kings ===
The Hall of Four Heavenly Kings is 18 metres (59 ft) long and 15 metres (49 ft) wide. Maitreya is enshrined in the Hall of Four Heavenly Kings and at the back of his statue is a statue of Skanda. Statues of Four Heavenly Kings are enshrined in the left and right side of the hall.

=== Mahavira Hall ===
The Mahavira Hall is 25 metres (82 ft) long, 20 metres (66 ft) wide with a construction area of 500 square metres (5,400 sq ft). The Mahavira Hall is the main hall in the temple. In the middle of the hall placed the statue of Sakyamuni, with statues of Eighteen Arhats stand on both sides of the hall.

=== Pilu Hall ===
Behind the Mahavira Hall is the Pilu Hall (毗卢殿). It is 30 metres (98 ft) long, 23 metres (75 ft) wide with a construction area of 680 square metres (7,300 sq ft). The hall, for the worship of Vairocana, more commonly known as "Pilu Buddha" in Chinese.

=== Pagoda of Seventh Patriarch ===
The Pagoda of Seventh Patriarch was originally built in the reign of Emperor Xuanzong of Tang dynasty. The 3.5-metre (11 ft) pagoda has granite structure with five storeys and five sides. Curved bars and cornices are set on each story, which are magnificent and become the symbol of Jingju Temple. Its body are engraved with Chinese characters "Pagoda of the Seventh Patriarch Hongji Chan Master in the Tang dynasty after his Parinirvana" (唐七祖弘济禅师归真之塔).
