= Jingju Temple (Xinyang) =

Buddhist temple

Guangshan Jingju Temple
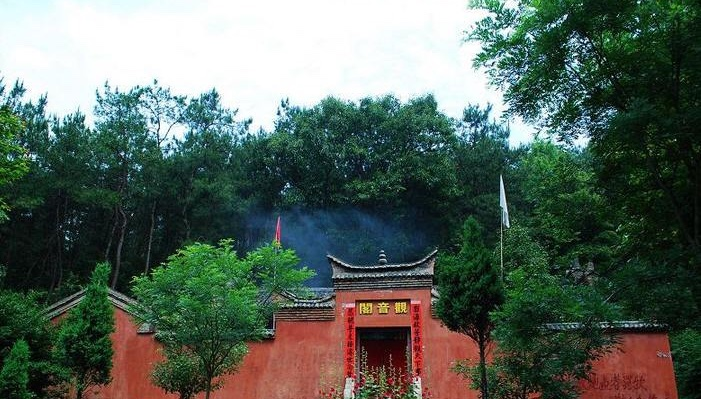
- Location: Guangshan, Xinyang, China

Guangshan Jingju Temple (simplified Chinese: 净居寺; traditional Chinese: 凈居寺; pinyin: Jìngjū Sì), located in Guangshan County, Henan Province, China, also known as "Emperor entitled Brahma Temple", is the birthplace of Guangshan Jingju Temple Gate of China's first Buddhist sect, Tiantai Sect. In the fifth year of Tianbao in the Northern Qi dynasty (554 A.D.), the eminent monk Huisi came to Dasu Mountain in Guangzhou to build a nunnery and open an altar to preach. Emperor Song Zhenzong's inscription "Emperor entitled Brahma Temple" is carved with five large-character plaques, which are still embedded on the door. The Daxiong Hall in the temple is a Ming dynasty building. There are still more than 30 steles inscribed by historical celebrities and scholars such as the "Emperor's powdered gold" stele in Wanli of the Ming dynasty, and the "Reconstruction Stele of Dasushan Brahma Temple" in Kangxi of Qing dynasty. The stele of Su Shi's poems (Song dynasty) on visiting Jingju Temple is also conserved within the temple.

== Monks ==
The Jingju Mountain where the Jingju Temple is located was a place for Maitreya Buddha to sermon. It is the birthplace of Tiantai Sect of Buddhism. There were many famous monks here in history of Buddhism. Based on ancient literature "Buddhism in the Tang Dynasty of China", "Dictionary of Chinese Names", "Chinese Temples and Bodhisattvas", "Guangshan County Chronicles" of the Ming, Qing, and Republic of China, respectively, and relevant materials at China and abroad, the famous monks here included but not limited to:

Huisi (515–577 AD) was a monk of the Northern and Southern dynasties, the founder of Jingju Temple, the third ancestor or patriarch of Tiantai Sect in China, and the teacher of Zhiyi, the actual founder of Tiantai Sect (ranked fourth).

Zhiyi, a monk in Sui dynasty, was the heir of Huisi and the actual founder of the Tiantai sect. He was known as "Tiantai Buddha". According to the Dictionary of Chinese Names, Zhiyi's family surname was Chen, and his style name was De'an. He lost his parents at the age of eight, and became a monk at Guoyuan Temple in Xiangzhou. In the first year of Chen Tianjia (560 AD), at the age of 23, he came to Dasu Mountain in Guangzhou to worship Huisi as his teacher. He learned Zen and practiced the Dharma Samadhi.
