= Pingqiao, Xinyang =

Pingqiao 平桥区
- District
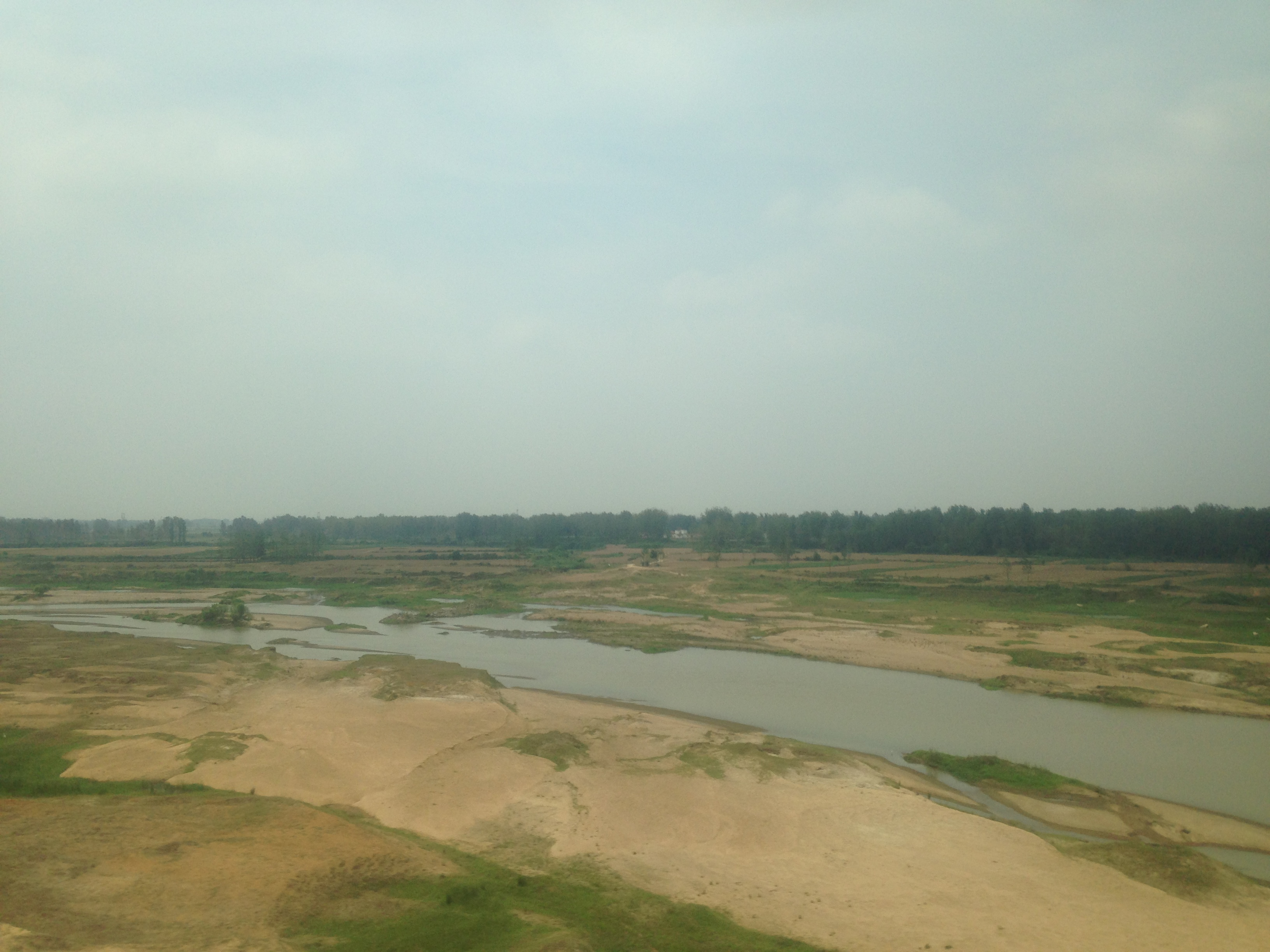
- Huaihe River in Pingqiao, Xinyang

- Location in Henan
- Coordinates: 32°06′04″N 114°07′34″E
- Country: People's Republic of China
- Province: Henan
- Prefecture-level city: Xinyang

Area
  - Total: 1,889 km^{2} (729 sq mi)

Population (2019)
  - Total: 747,600
  - Density: 395.8/km^{2} (1,025/sq mi)
- Time zone: UTC+8 (China Standard)
- Postal code: 464100

Pingqiao District (simplified Chinese: 平桥区; traditional Chinese: 平橋區; pinyin: Píngqiáo Qū) is a district and the seat of the city of Xinyang, Henan province, China, bordering Hubei province to the northwest.

== Administrative divisions ==
As of 2012, this district is divided to 6 subdistricts, 5 towns and 9 townships.

Subdistricts

- Yangshan Subdistrict (羊山街道)
- Qianjin Subdistrict (前进街道)
- Nanjinglu Subdistrict (南京路街道)
- Pingqiao Subdistrict (平桥街道)
- Gan’an Subdistrict (甘岸街道)
- Wulidian Subdistrict (五里店街道)

Towns

- Minggang (明港镇)
- Wuli (五里镇)
- Xingji (邢集镇)
- Pingchang (平昌镇)
- Yanghe (洋河镇)

Townships

- Xiaowang Township (肖王乡)
- Longjing Township (龙井乡)
- Hudian Township (胡店乡)
- Pengjiawan Township (彭家湾乡)
- Changtai Township (长台乡)
- Xiaodian Township (肖店乡)
- Wanggang Township (王岗乡)
- Gaoliangdian Township (高粱店乡)
- Chashan Township (查山乡)
