= Shihe, Xinyang =

Shihe 浉河区
- District
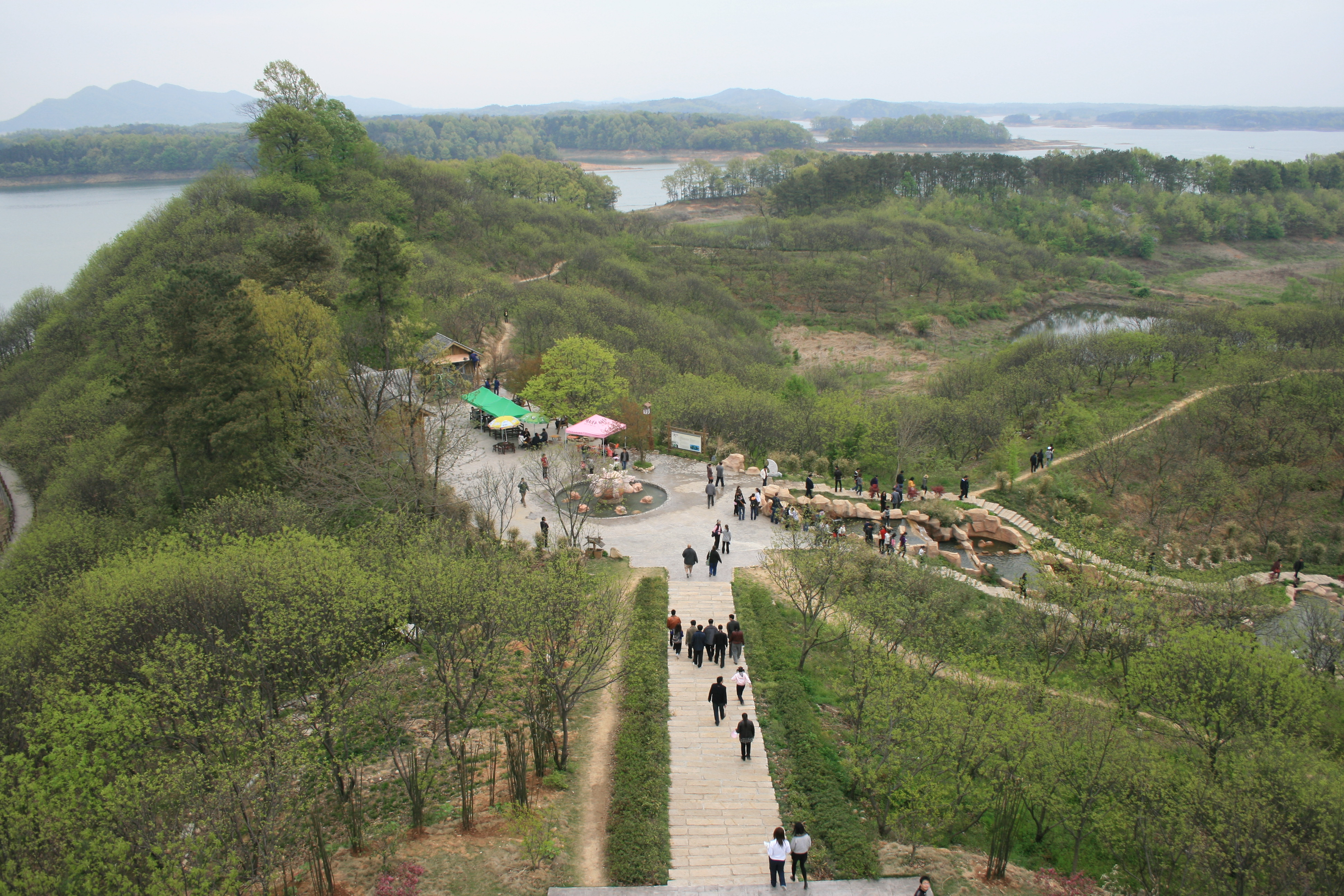
- Nanwan Lake

- Location in Henan
- Coordinates: 32°07′01″N 114°03′32″E
- Country: People's Republic of China
- Province: Henan
- Prefecture-level city: Xinyang

Area
  - Total: 1,783 km^{2} (688 sq mi)

Population (2019)
  - Total: 674,900
  - Density: 378.5/km^{2} (980.4/sq mi)
- Time zone: UTC+8 (China Standard)
- Postal code: 464000
- Website: www.shihe.gov.cn

Shihe (Chinese: 浉河; pinyin: Shīhé) is a built-up (metro) district of the city of Xinyang, Henan province, China. Shihe District was established in 1998, and got its name from the Shi River (浉河).

== Administrative divisions ==
As of 2012, this district is subdivided to 9 subdistricts, 3 towns and 6 townships.

Subdistricts

- Laocheng Subdistrict (老城街道)
- Minquan Subdistrict (民权街道)
- Chezhan Subdistrict (车站街道)
- Wulidun Subdistrict (五里墩街道)
- Wuxing Subdistrict (五星街道)
- Hudong Subdistrict (湖东街道)
- Nanwan Subdistrict (南湾街道)
- Jinniushan Subdistrict (金牛山街道)
- Shuangjing Subdistrict (双井街道)

Towns

- Lijiazhai (李家寨镇)
- Wujiadian (吴家店镇)
- Dongshuanghe (东双河镇)

Townships

- Youhe Township (游河乡)
- Dongjiahe Township (董家河乡)
- Shihegang Township (浉河港乡)
- Tanjiahe Township (谭家河乡)
- Liulin Township (柳林乡)
- Ersanliqiao Township (十三里桥乡)

== Economy ==
In 2023, Shihe District recorded a regional GDP of 31.941 billion yuan, an increase of 1.4% over the previous year. Among them: the added value of the primary industry reached 3.685 billion yuan (+1.0%); the secondary industry reached 7.264 billion yuan (−0.6%); and the tertiary industry reached 20.993 billion yuan (+2.3%). The industrial structure ratio was 11.5:22.8:65.7, respectively. The district’s per capita regional GDP reached 52,178 yuan, an increase of 1.5%. Fixed asset investment (excluding rural households) grew by 1.2%.

=== Fiscal status ===
In 2023, Shihe District’s general public budget revenue totaled 1.331 billion yuan, a decrease of 1.5% year-on-year. Tax revenue reached 1.126 billion yuan (−5.6%), accounting for 84.7% of total general public budget revenue. General public budget expenditure amounted to 3.721 billion yuan, an increase of 3.1%.

=== Primary industry ===
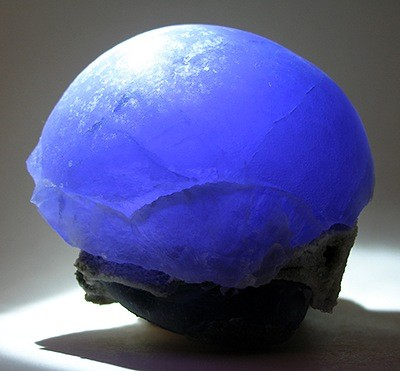
Blue fluorite "cap" on matrix, Minggang Fluorite mine, from Shihe

- In 2023, the total output value of agriculture, forestry, animal husbandry, fishery, and supporting services reached 8.259 billion yuan, up 1.4% at comparable prices. Among them: agriculture 6.283 billion yuan (+0.4%); forestry 270 million yuan (+3.8%); animal husbandry 321 million yuan (+0.4%); fishery 214 million yuan (+1.4%); supporting services 1.170 billion yuan (+8.3%).
- Grain planting area reached 14.12 thousand hectares (−0.3%). Wheat accounted for 2.41 thousand ha (−1.7%); rice 10.85 thousand ha (+0.6%). Tea planting area was 41.65 thousand ha (−0.05%); vegetables and edible fungi 17.71 thousand ha (+0.04%).
- Total grain output reached 109,340 tons (unchanged). Summer grain totaled 8,150 tons (−5.0%, all wheat). Autumn grain totaled 101,190 tons (+0.4%), including 95,896 tons of rice (+0.9%).
- Major agricultural outputs: tea 37,460 tons (−0.6%); chestnuts 28,127 tons (+0.9%); vegetables and edible fungi 542,063 tons (+0.01%); aquatic products 12,173 tons (+1.5%).
- Livestock products: pork, beef, mutton, and poultry meat totaled 1,365 tons (−62.4%); poultry eggs 978 tons (−91.3%).

=== Secondary industry ===
Shihe District’s traditional industrial pillar sectors include metallurgy, building materials, chemicals, textiles, and energy. The five leading industries are equipment manufacturing, food processing, new materials, electronic information, and automobiles and auto parts.

- In 2023, the added value of industrial enterprises above designated size decreased by 5.6%, with a product sales rate of 100.1%.
- By industrial type: light industry grew 5.6%, while heavy industry declined 6.6%.
- By ownership: state-owned enterprises (−4.9%); joint-stock enterprises (−5.4%); foreign-funded and Hong Kong/Macao/Taiwan-invested enterprises (−20.6%).
- By public vs. non-public: public-sector enterprises (−4.7%); non-public enterprises (−8.8%).
- By key industrial groups: five leading industries (−17.0%); traditional pillar industries (−5.7%); strategic emerging industries (−6.0%); high-tech industries (+25.3%); high-growth manufacturing (−13.6%); high-energy-consuming industries (−5.4%).

=== Tertiary industry ===
In 2023, total retail sales of consumer goods reached 20.620 billion yuan, an increase of 4.8% year-on-year. Urban retail sales reached 20.305 billion yuan (+5.0%), while rural retail sales totaled 315 million yuan (−5.2%).
