= Queshan railway station =

Railway station in Queshan County, Zhumadian, Henan, China

Queshan 确山

General information
- Location: Queshan County, Zhumadian, Henan; China
- Coordinates: 32°48′13″N 114°01′51″E
- Operator: CR Wuhan
- Line: Beijing–Guangzhou railway
- Distance: Beijing–Guangzhou railway: 881 kilometres (547 mi) from Beijing West; 1,415 kilometres (879 mi) from Guangzhou
- Platforms: 3 (1 side platform and 1 island platform)
- Tracks: 8

Other information
- Station code: 20870 (TMIS code); QSN (telegraph code); QSH (Pinyin code)
- Classification: Class 3 station (三等站)

History
- Opened: 1903; 123 years ago

Services
Preceding station	China Railway	Following station
Zhumadian towards Beijing or Beijing West	Beijing–Guangzhou railway	Minggang towards Guangzhou
Location
- Location within Henan Location within China

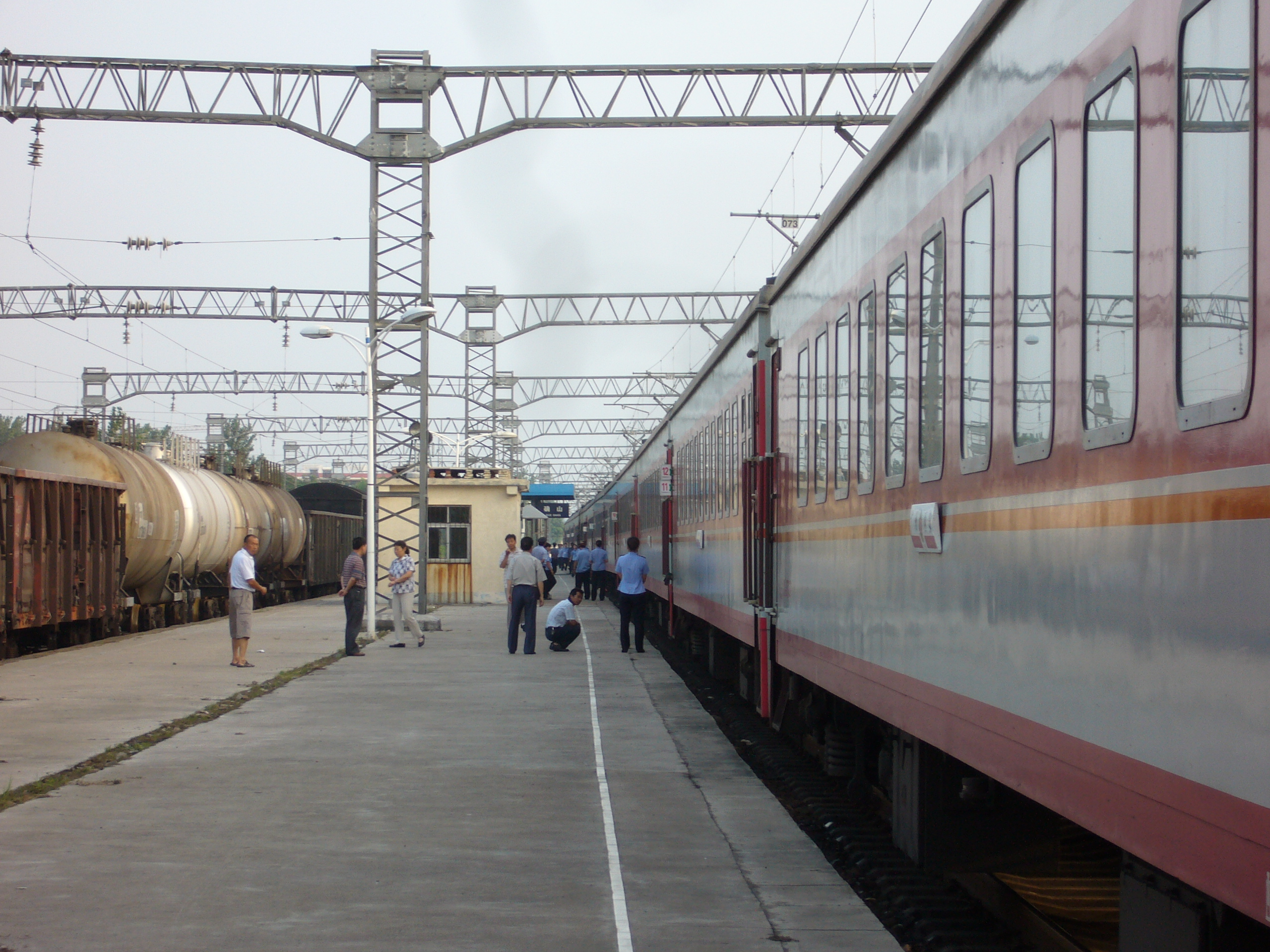
Queshan Railway Station

Queshan railway station (Chinese: 确山站) is a station on Beijing–Guangzhou railway in Queshan County, Zhumadian, Henan.

== History ==
The station was established in 1903.
