= Xinyang Maojian tea =

Chinese green tea

Maojian
- Type: Green
- Other names: Chinese: 毛尖, Green Tip or Tippy Green
- Origin: Henan Province, China
- Quick description: A green tea with a sweet taste

Xinyang Maojian tea (simplified Chinese: 信阳毛尖; traditional Chinese: 信陽毛尖; pinyin: Xìnyáng Máojiān; pronounced [ɕînjǎŋ mǎʊtɕjɛ́n]), also known as Yu Maofeng, is a green tea produced in Xinyang, Henan. The fresh tea leaves of Xinyang Maojian Tea are harvested from tea trees and processed through various processes such as withering, kneading, and drying. It is often designated as a famous Chinese tea. It is one of the top ten famous teas in China and one of the famous specialties in Henan Province. The main producing areas are in Xinhe City (now Xinyang City), Pingqiao District (formerly Xinyang County), Guangshan County, Xin County, and Luoshan County. Created by Han tea farmers. In the early years of the Republic of China, the top five tea houses in Xinyang Tea District produced the high-quality Benshan Maojian tea, which was officially named "Xinyang Maojian".

== Characteristics ==
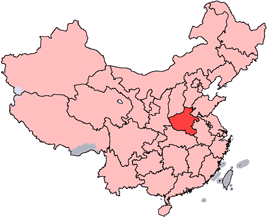
Xinyang Maojian tea is grown in Henan province, China.

Xinyang Maojian is known for its unique and delicious flavor. The color is yellowish especially when boiled with water. The tea liquor is slightly thick and tastes refreshingly brisk and with a long-lasting aftertaste.

The tea leaves, which are covered in abundant white hairs, are thin, tender and evenly shaped. Xinyang Maojian tea is especially notable for its hairy tips, and its leaves are described as thin, round, and straight with a conspicuous gloss.

Another notable characteristic of the Xinyang Maojian is its fragrant aroma. This is attributed to the presence of significant amounts of acids and esters such as the Hexadecanoic and Phthalic acids, which collectively give off a strong floral smell.Key odorants in Xinyang Maojian varies with harvest season,Its smell include nonanal, β-ionone, linalool, geraniol, and β-cyclocitral.

In 1915, at the Panama International Exposition, it won the gold medal with Guizhou Maotai "贵州茅台". In 1990, the Xinyang Maojian brand also participated in the national appraisal and won the first place in the comprehensive quality of green tea. Xinyang Maojian is known as the "king of green tea". Xinyang Maojian brand ranks third in the value of public brands in China's tea region for many years. In 2017, in the evaluation of China's tea regional brand value, Xinyang Maojian ranked second in the brand value list with 5.991 billion yuan.

== History ==
Xinyang Maojian (信阳毛尖) is one type of green tea that originally was produced in central China. The name can be divided into two parts that are associated with two aspects: "Xinyang" (信阳) is for Xinyang city in Henan, China that produces this type of tea; "mao jian" (毛尖) are the words to depict the shape of the tea — "mao" (毛) means tiny fuzz in cup when brewed and "jian" (尖) refers to shape the leaves: sharp, full young leaves.

Xinyang has a tea history dating back to 2300 years ago. In 1987, at Gushi County of Xinyang, tea was discovered in an ancient tomb.

In 1080AD in Song dynasty, one of the greatest scholar Su shi commented that "Xinyang tea is the best among all tea from area of southern Huai river"

In the past century, Xinyang Maojian has been considered one of the 10 best teas in China. It has a wide market and popularity in Henan province, where people drink it as a relaxing beverage after a busy day.

In Xinyang Maojian history, there were eight famous tea shops:

- Yuanzhen Tea (元贞茶社, 1903)
- Longtan Tea (龙潭茶社, 1903)
- Hongji/Cheyun Tea (宏济/车云茶社, 1910)
- Yushen Tea (裕申茶, 1911)
- Guangyi Tea (广益茶社, 1912)
- Wanshou Tea (万寿茶社, 1913)
- Guangsheng Tea (广生茶社, 1915)
- Bohou Tea (博厚茶社, 1919)

In 1914, Longtan Tea and other shops sent teas to the 1915 Panama-Pacific International Exposition and won a gold medal. Over the next 100 years, the tea shops disappeared, while Longtan Tea has survived and developed into a group of companies known as Henan Xinyang Maojian Group.

== Origin ==
In southern Henan Province, Xinyang is a place with a mild climate and good conditions for growing trees that produce the tea's unique quality: Xinyang tea trees are planted at high altitudes where the weather is clearly divided by four seasons. Many high mountains, such as Mt. Cheyun, Mt. Jiyun, and Mt. Tianyun, surround the location and support environmental humidification and moisture. Moreover, the location is abundant with forests, clouds, rainfall, with large temperature difference between day and night. These geographical advantages help keep Xinyang's soil healthy and fertile, while trees more efficiently absorb chemical elements to produce higher quality green tea.

== Geographical condition ==
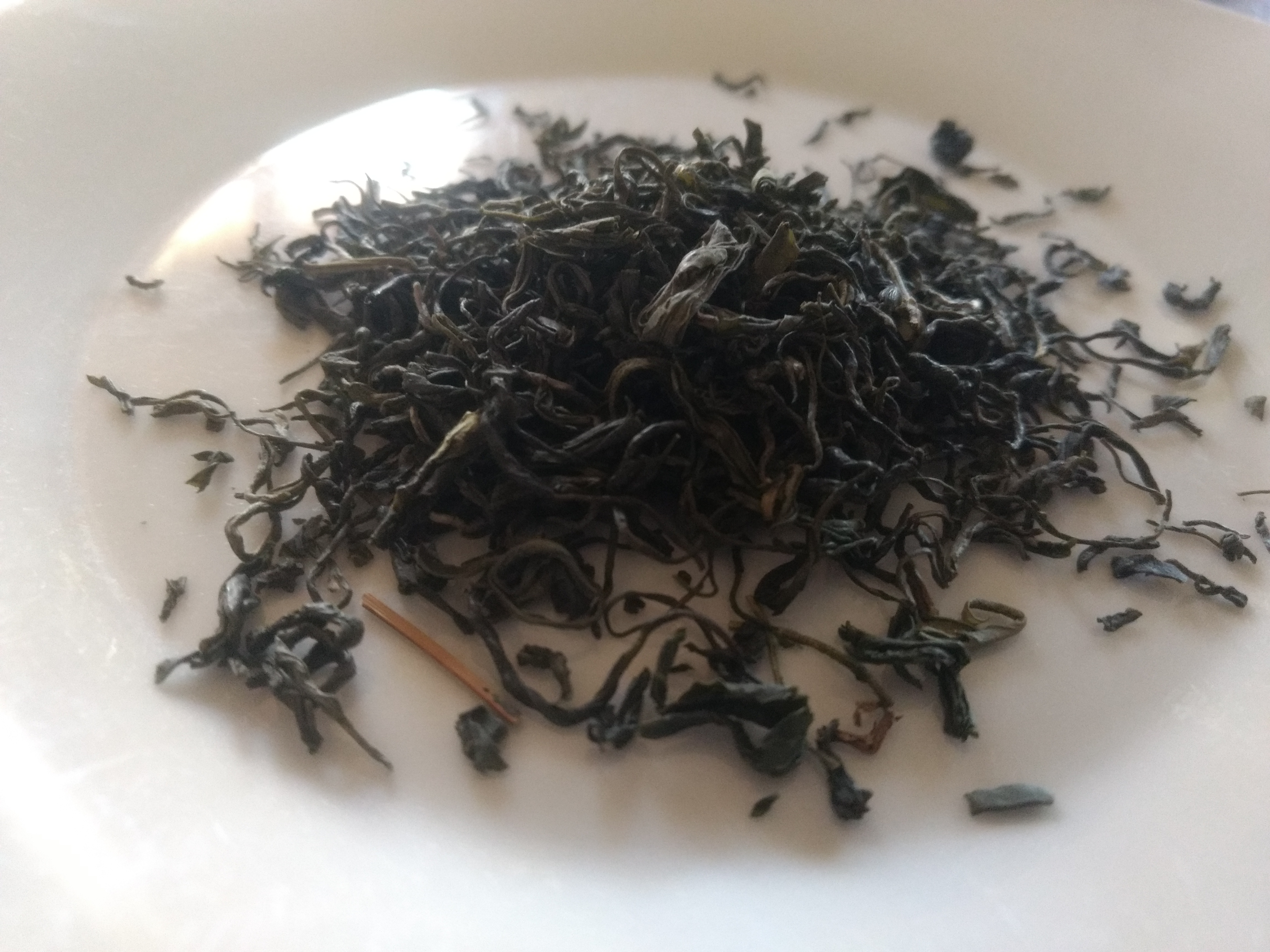
Maojian tea.

Xinyang has unique natural conditions for the growth of tea trees. The annual average temperature here is 15.1 °C, and the average year is between 14.5 °C and 15.5 °C. Beginning in late March, the average daily temperature reached 10 °C, which lasted for more than 220 days and did not decline until late November. The effective accumulated temperature is 4864 °C, and the 80% year is 4683 °C. The average monthly temperature from April to November is 20.7 °C, the hottest July average temperature is 27.7 °C, and the coldest January average temperature is 1.6 °C. Xinyang has abundant rainfall, with an average annual rainfall of 1134.7mm, and is concentrated in the tea season. From April to November, the number of hours of illumination was 1592.5 hours (accounting for 73% of the total number of hours in the year), the amount of solar radiation was 89.25 kcal/cm^{2}, and the effective radiation was 43.74 kcal/cm^{2}.

The soil in Xinyang Mountain area is mostly yellow and black sandy loam, deep and loose, with more humus content and higher fertility, and the PH value is between 4 and 6.5. Tea farmers have traditionally chosen to grow tea in high mountains at an altitude of 500 to 800 meters. The mountains here are undulating, forests are dense, vegetation is abundant, rainfall is abundant, clouds are filled, and the air is humid (relative humidity is more than 75%). The sun is late and the sun is not strong, and the temperature difference between day and night is large. Tea tree bud leaves grow slowly, have strong tenderness, rich hypertrophy, and more effective material accumulation. In particular, Xinyang is located in the northern latitude and high latitudes, and the annual average temperature is low, which is conducive to the synthesis and accumulation of nitrogenous compounds such as amino acids and caffeine.

== Fresh tea leaf requirements ==
The harvest season for Maojian tea is in spring and fall. However, the best quality tea comes from leaves that are harvested in mid-April. Chinese call it "Yu Qian Tea", which means the tea is picked earlier in the spring before the solar term 'Grain Rain' (Guyu). Because the leaves are rare and fresh, the price is two or three times higher than tea produced after this season. In general, the approximate ratio of fresh leaves to produced tea is 50,000 buds: 500 grams.

Dating back to ancient Chinese history, tea production was initially developed during the Zhou dynasty (ca. 1066–221 BCE). A historical account referred to a specific requirement for picking Maojian leaves. It prescribes that only girls aged 15 to 16 years old should be involved and that these workers need to bathe and change their clothes prior to picking. Picking of the tea shoots must be done by mouth and these were deposited in perfumed pouches hanging in the girls' chests.

The tea technique was originally invented in southern China, which then spread over the entire country with political and economic growth, as well as improvements in cultural interaction, transportation, and communication. Drinking tea gradually became more widely accessible, although also a symbol of class division in China. In his book History of Tea, Chen Yuan explains, "Tea culture followed transportation movements settled in Henan's Qinling Mountain. Because of weather conditions, trees could no longer be pushed northward." In 1987, archaeologists in the Xinyang area discovered ancient tea in excavated tomb sites, and determined that the tea was made in 875 BCE.

The tea industry has taken off even more in the twentieth century, and Xinyang Maojian has continued to build up its own unique style and fame. The late Qing dynasty scholar Hanlin Chen and others influenced a number of urban and rural areas, including Xinyang gentlemen, landlords, and merchants. One after another, different groups and communities began to develop their own tea production. They went to Hangzhou, Zhejiang and other important tea places to buy seeds, and learned the West Lake Longjing tea frying techniques. Based on knowing production technology, as well as knowledge about digestion and absorption, people in Xinyang eventually improved their techniques and created a unique tea-frying process. In 1913, they produced "The Mountain Tippy" tea, later renamed "Xinyang Maojian." Xinyang Maojian tea won gold medal in the Panama-Pacific International Exposition, San Francisco, in 1914 and was selected for the top ten in 1958.

== Main variety ==
According to the growing season of Xinyang Maojian, local people are accustomed to classify fresh leaves as spring tea, summer tea and autumn tea (balu tea).

Spring tea

Generally refers to the tea produced before the end of May of that year. After the tea tree is rehabilitated for one winter, the spring tea shoots are strong and strong, the leaves are soft and tender, and the hair is rich. The leaf is rich in effective substances and is the best quality in the whole year. Local people are accustomed to divide it into Mingqian tea, Yuqian tea and Chunwei tea according to the spring tea growth period.

Ming tea

Tea collected before the Ching Ming Festival (around April 5 of the Gregorian calendar). The buds that just emerged in spring were harvested. During this period, the tea was tender and scented with a touch of scent. Because of the slow growth rate, almost 100% of the bud heads are the highest level of Xinyang Maojian tea. The pre-Qing tea produced by Dashan is the best in Xinyang Maojian treasures.

Tea before the rain

Tea collected before Gu Yu (around April 20 in the Gregorian calendar). The spring temperature is moderate and the rainfall is abundant. The growth of tea leaves is full of anger, and one bud and one leaf formally form. Soaking the 'bar shape' is only second to the previous level, but the taste is slightly aggravated. This kind of tea combines the sense of the shape of the letterhead of Xinyang and the taste of it. (shape, taste is 50% each). Mainly suitable for people with slightly higher consumption.

Spring tail tea

Tea collected before the end of spring (the end of the fifth month of the solar calendar). Compared with the tea before the rain and the tea before the rain, the strips are slightly worse, but the bubbles are good and the price is relatively cheap. Most of the ordinary teas that locals drink are spring tea.

Summer tea

Refers to the tea produced at the end of June–July. As the temperature rises, the tea also grows rapidly. The soluble matter in the leaves is reduced, and the bitter and astringent substances such as caffeine, anthocyanin and tea polyphenol are increased. Therefore, the taste of summer tea is slightly bitter, and the aroma is not as strong as that of spring tea. The leaves are relatively large and wide. But summer tea is resistant to foam and the price is cheap.

Autumn tea

The tea that was harvested after August is called autumn tea, also called white dew tea. In autumn, the tea trees are harvested in spring and summer. The newly grown leaves contain relatively less material, yellowish leaves, different sizes, and the taste and aroma are relatively dull. Bailu tea is neither as tender and tender as spring tea, nor is it so dry and bitter as summer tea, but has a unique sweet and fragrant aroma.

== See also ==
- Lists of Chinese Teas
