= Xinyang =

Xinyang 信阳市 Sinyang
- Prefecture-level city
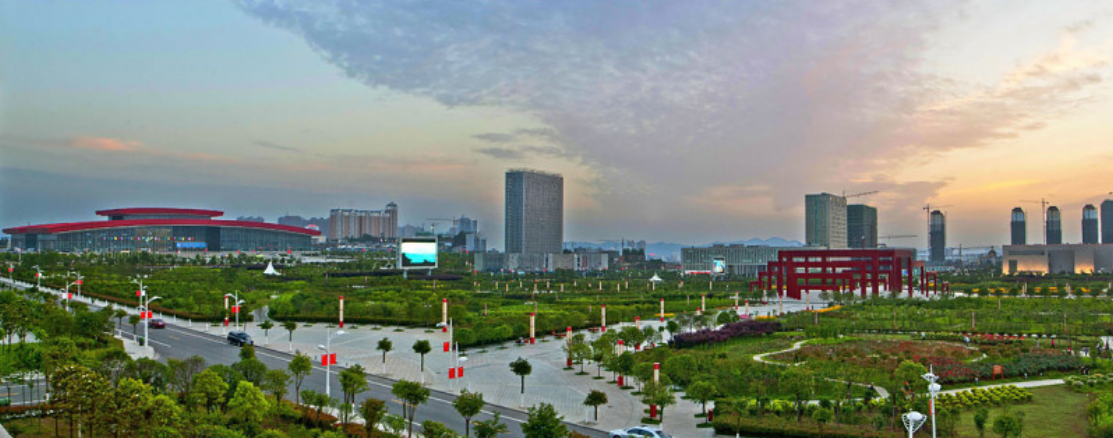
- View of Xinyang, 2014

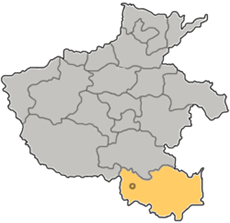
- Location of Xinyang City jurisdiction in Henan

- Location on the North China Plain Xinyang (China)
- Coordinates (Xinyang municipal government): 32°08′56″N 114°05′28″E
- Country: People's Republic of China
- Province: Henan
- Municipal seat: Pingqiao District

Area
  - Prefecture-level city: 18,819 km^{2} (7,266 sq mi)
  - Urban: 3,865.9 km^{2} (1,492.6 sq mi)
  - Metro: 3,665.9 km^{2} (1,415.4 sq mi)

Population (2020 Census for total, 2018 otherwise)
  - Prefecture-level city: 6,234,401
  - Density: 331.28/km^{2} (858.02/sq mi)
  - Urban: 1,416,800
  - Urban density: 366.49/km^{2} (949.20/sq mi)
  - Metro: 1,416,800
  - Metro density: 386.48/km^{2} (1,001.0/sq mi)

GDP
  - Prefecture-level city: CN¥ 203.8 billion US$ 30.7 billion
  - Per capita: CN¥ 31,733; US$ 4,777
- Time zone: UTC+8 (China Standard)
- Area code: 0376
- ISO 3166 code: CN-HA-15
- Major Nationalities: Han
- License plate prefixes: 豫S
- Website: www.xinyang.gov.cn/sitesources/xinyang/page_pc/index.html

Xinyang (simplified Chinese: 信阳; traditional Chinese: 信陽; pinyin: Xìnyáng; postal: Sinyang) is a prefecture-level city in southeastern Henan province, People's Republic of China, the southernmost administrative division in the province. Its total population was 6,234,401 according to the 2020 census. As of the 2010 census, 1,230,042 of them lived in the built-up (or metro) area made of two urban districts, Pingqiao and Shihe.

== History ==
As early as over 8,000 years ago, Neolithic cultures began primitive agriculture of considerable scale along the Huai River, such as the Peiligang, Longshan and Qujialing cultures.

During the Great Leap Forward, one million died in what was known as the Xinyang Incident.

== Geography ==
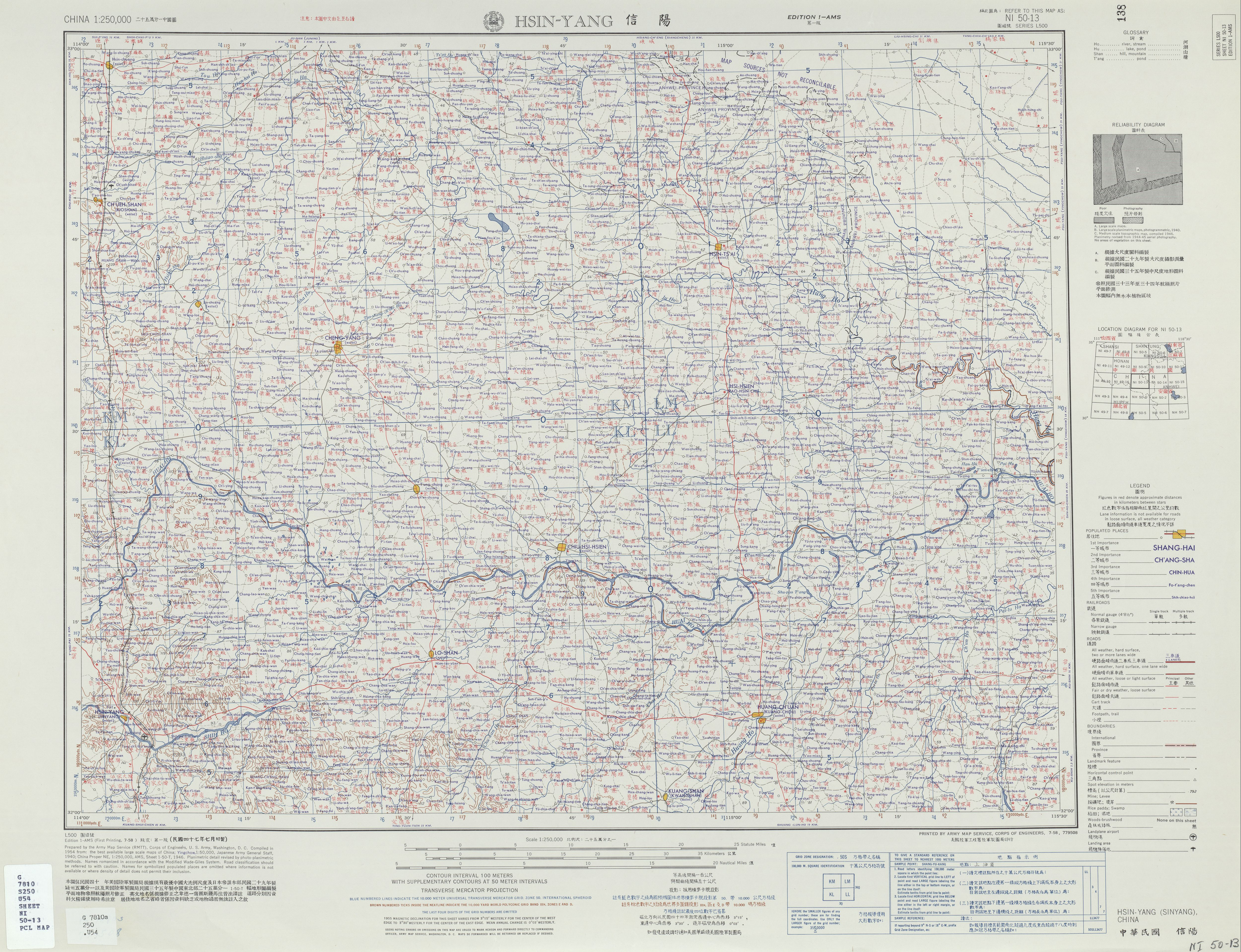
Map including Xinyang (labeled as HSIN-YANG (SINYANG) (walled) 信陽) (AMS, 1954)

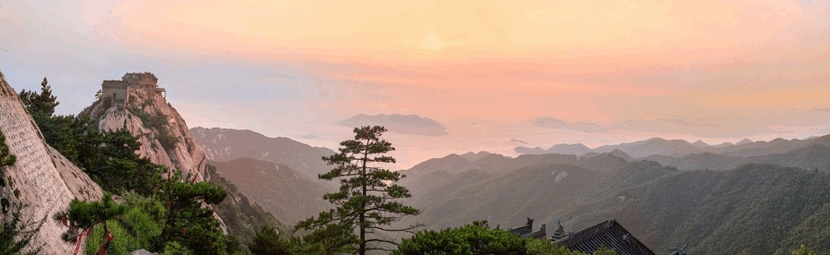
Jinlanshan National Forest Park (金兰山国家森林公园), Xin County

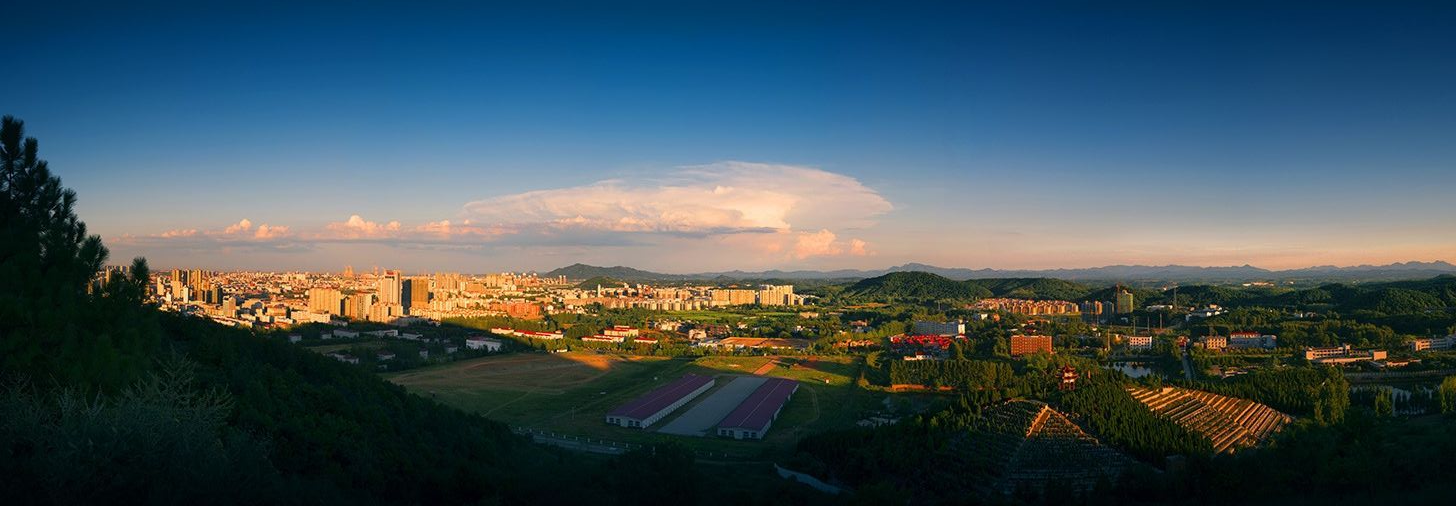
Xinyang panorama, 2014

=== Geography of city ===
The prefecture-level city of Xinyang has a total land area of 18,819 square kilometres (7,266 sq mi). The city is located in the southernmost part of Henan Province on the south bank of the Huai River and in the middle of the Dabie Mountains area. It borders the cities Zhumadian to the north and Nanyang to the northwest, and the provinces of Anhui and Hubei to the east and south respectively. The region where Xinyang is located is considered a subtropical area and the Dabie mountainous terrain is mainly to the north, south, and east of the city.

=== Climate ===
Xinyang has a monsoon-influenced, four-season distinct humid subtropical climate (Köppen Cfa/Cwa), with cold, damp winters, and hot, humid summers. The months of April through June here are slightly cooler than much of the rest of the province. The monthly 24-hour average temperature ranges from 2.4 °C (36.3 °F) in January to 27.3 °C (81.1 °F) in July; the annual mean is 15.54 °C (60.0 °F). The annual precipitation is just above 1,100 millimetres (43 in), and close to two-thirds of it occurs from May to September. With monthly percent possible sunshine ranging from 38% in March to 47% in four months, the city receives 1,974 hours of bright sunshine annually; January through March are the cloudiest months.

Climate data for Xinyang, elevation 115 m (377 ft), (1991–2020 normals, extremes 1951–present)
| Month | Jan | Feb | Mar | Apr | May | Jun | Jul | Aug | Sep | Oct | Nov | Dec | Year |
|---|---|---|---|---|---|---|---|---|---|---|---|---|---|
| Record high °C (°F) | 20.6 (69.1) | 26.5 (79.7) | 34.3 (93.7) | 34.3 (93.7) | 36.3 (97.3) | 38.7 (101.7) | 40.1 (104.2) | 40.9 (105.6) | 37.3 (99.1) | 34.2 (93.6) | 30.0 (86.0) | 21.7 (71.1) | 40.9 (105.6) |
| Mean daily maximum °C (°F) | 7.0 (44.6) | 10.4 (50.7) | 15.9 (60.6) | 22.3 (72.1) | 26.9 (80.4) | 30.1 (86.2) | 31.9 (89.4) | 30.9 (87.6) | 27.0 (80.6) | 22.1 (71.8) | 15.7 (60.3) | 9.5 (49.1) | 20.8 (69.5) |
| Daily mean °C (°F) | 2.5 (36.5) | 5.5 (41.9) | 10.7 (51.3) | 16.9 (62.4) | 21.8 (71.2) | 25.4 (77.7) | 27.7 (81.9) | 26.6 (79.9) | 22.1 (71.8) | 16.7 (62.1) | 10.5 (50.9) | 4.8 (40.6) | 15.9 (60.7) |
| Mean daily minimum °C (°F) | −0.9 (30.4) | 1.7 (35.1) | 6.6 (43.9) | 12.4 (54.3) | 17.5 (63.5) | 21.5 (70.7) | 24.4 (75.9) | 23.3 (73.9) | 18.4 (65.1) | 12.8 (55.0) | 6.7 (44.1) | 1.3 (34.3) | 12.1 (53.9) |
| Record low °C (°F) | −20.0 (−4.0) | −16.0 (3.2) | −6.6 (20.1) | −0.6 (30.9) | 5.0 (41.0) | 11.9 (53.4) | 17.0 (62.6) | 14.1 (57.4) | 7.9 (46.2) | −0.4 (31.3) | −6.4 (20.5) | −12.4 (9.7) | −20.0 (−4.0) |
| Average precipitation mm (inches) | 32.3 (1.27) | 38.7 (1.52) | 64.4 (2.54) | 80.3 (3.16) | 111.8 (4.40) | 163.7 (6.44) | 204.8 (8.06) | 154.5 (6.08) | 86.5 (3.41) | 74.2 (2.92) | 47.2 (1.86) | 23.9 (0.94) | 1,082.3 (42.6) |
| Average precipitation days (≥ 0.1 mm) | 6.9 | 8.4 | 9.1 | 9.0 | 11.0 | 10.2 | 12.0 | 11.6 | 10.2 | 9.4 | 8.1 | 6.2 | 112.1 |
| Average snowy days | 5.1 | 3.6 | 1.3 | 0 | 0 | 0 | 0 | 0 | 0 | 0 | 0.8 | 2.3 | 13.1 |
| Average relative humidity (%) | 70 | 70 | 67 | 67 | 69 | 75 | 79 | 81 | 78 | 74 | 71 | 68 | 72 |
| Mean monthly sunshine hours | 106.6 | 108.9 | 143.1 | 167.3 | 172.6 | 162.4 | 177.1 | 162.5 | 139.0 | 136.5 | 127.9 | 122.2 | 1,726.1 |
| Percentage possible sunshine | 33 | 35 | 38 | 43 | 40 | 38 | 41 | 40 | 38 | 39 | 41 | 39 | 39 |
Source: China Meteorological Administration

== Administration ==
The Xinyang City is further divided into two districts and eight counties.

Xinyang City has 2 districts and 8 counties, including Shihe District, Pingqiao District, Huangchuan County, Guangshan County, Xi County, Xin County, Luoshan County, Shangcheng County, Huaibin County, and Gushi County.

Map
| English name | Simplified | Traditional | Pinyin | Area | Population | Density |
|---|---|---|---|---|---|---|
| Shihe District | 浉河区 | 浉河區 | Shīhé Qū | 1,782.51 | 594,391 | 333 |
| Pingqiao District | 平桥区 | 平橋區 | Píngqiáo Qū | 1,883.42 | 635,651 | 337 |
| Huangchuan County | 潢川县 | 潢川縣 | Huángchuān Xiàn | 1,638 | 630,333 | 385 |
| Huaibin County | 淮滨县 | 淮濱縣 | Huáibīn Xiàn | 1,208 | 570,156 | 472 |
| Xi County | 息县 | 息縣 | Xī Xiàn | 1,835 | 793,746 | 433 |
| Xin County | 新县 | 新縣 | Xīn Xiàn | 1,612 | 275,285 | 171 |
| Shangcheng County | 商城县 | 商城縣 | Shāngchéng Xiàn | 2,130 | 495,491 | 233 |
| Gushi County | 固始县 | 固始縣 | Gùshǐ Xiàn | 2,946 | 1,023,857 | 348 |
| Luoshan County | 罗山县 | 羅山縣 | Luóshān Xiàn | 2,065 | 504,542 | 244 |
| Guangshan County | 光山县 | 光山縣 | Guāngshān Xiàn | 1,835 | 275,282 | 150 |

== Demographics ==
According to the Seventh National Census in 2020, the city's Permanent Population (hukou) was 6,234,401. Compared with 6,108,683 people in the Sixth National Census in 2010, the number increased by 125,718, representing a growth of 2.06%, with an average annual growth rate of 0.20%.

According to the 2010 Census, the population of Xinyang is of 6,109,106 inhabitants, 6.39% less than the population marked on the last census of 2000, when there were 6,527,368 inhabitants in the city.

Its built-up area is home to 1,230,042 inhabitants spread out on 2 urban districts and 3,665.9 square kilometres (1,415.4 sq mi).

== Culture ==
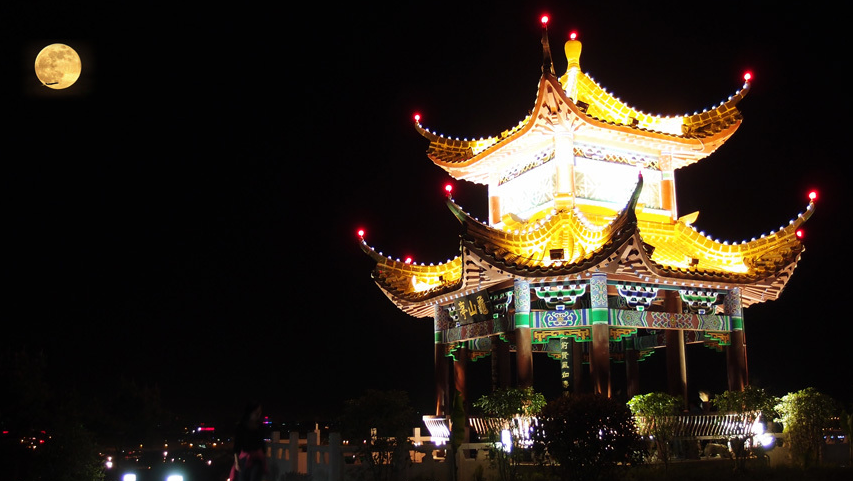
Guishan Pavilion (龟山亭)

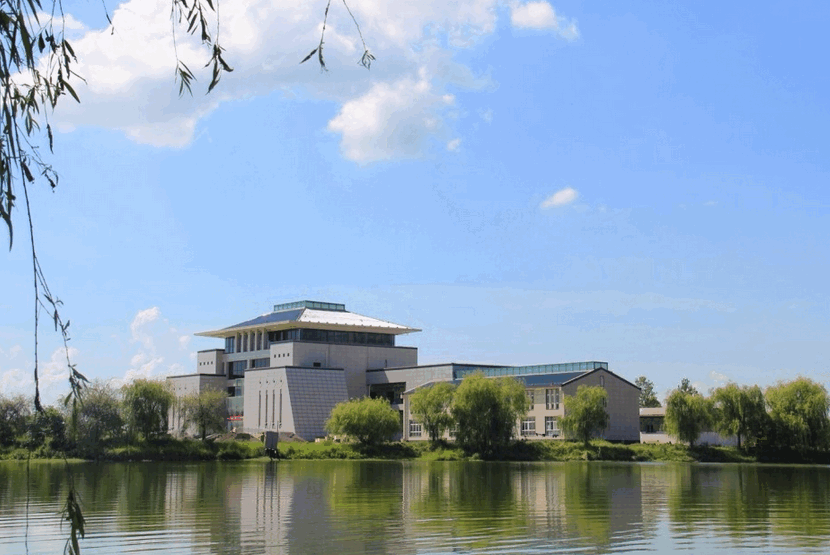
Huaihe Museum (淮河博物馆), Huaibin County

Xinyang Tea Culture Festival is held during April 28 and 30 of every year. The 25,000-capacity Xinyang Stadium, which has a capacity of 25,000, is located in the city. It is used mostly for association football and sometimes for athletics.

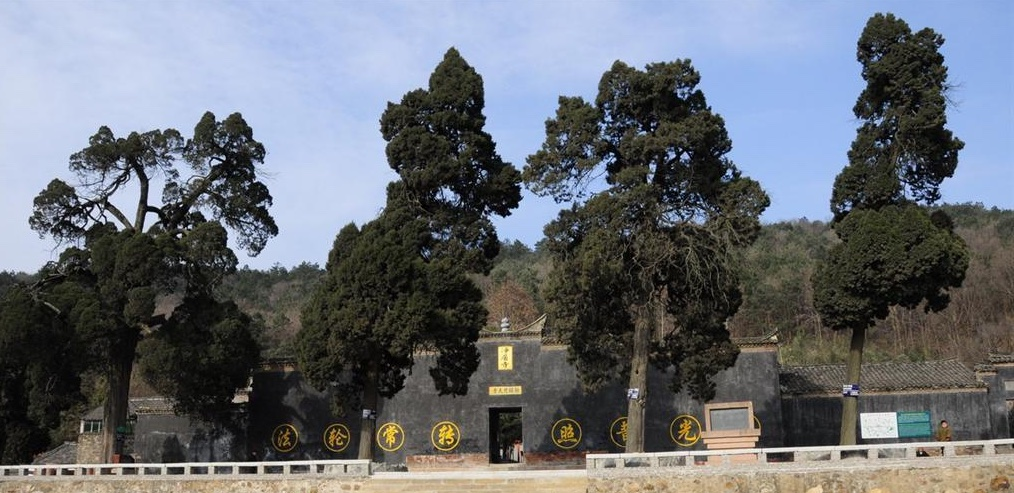
Jingju Temple（净居寺）

The Jingju Temple in Guangshan county was the source of the first Chinese section of the Buddhist "Tiantai school" as early as the fifth year of Tianbao in the Northern Qi Dynasty (554 A.D.), since the saint monk Huisi came to the Jingju Temple. Emperor Shenzong of Song bestowed the "Emperor entitled Brahma Temple" still conserved in the temple.

== Transportation ==
- Highway system
  - China National Highway 312
  - China National Highway 107
  - G4 Beijing–Hong Kong and Macau Expressway
  - G40 Shanghai–Xi'an Expressway
  - G45 Daqing–Guangzhou Expressway
- Railway system
  - Jingguang Railway
  - Jingjiu Railway
  - Ningxi Railway
  - Beijing–Guangzhou–Shenzhen–Hong Kong High-Speed Railway
- Airport
  - Xinyang Minggang Airport

== Education ==
- Higher Education
  - Xinyang Normal College
  - Xinyang Agricultural College
- Secondary Education
  - Xinyang Senior High School
  - Guangshan Second High School

== Recreation ==
- Jigong Mountain
- Nanwan Lake
- Lingshan Temple
- Jingju Temple

== Twin towns ==
- Niimi, Okayama, Japan
- Ashkelon, Israel

== See also ==
- List of twin towns and sister cities in China
