= List of mass stabbings in the United States =

This is an incomplete list of mass stabbings in the United States. A mass stabbing is a single incident in which multiple victims are harmed or killed in a knife-enabled crime. In such attacks, sharp objects are thrust at the victim, piercing through the skin and harming the victim. Examples of sharp instruments used in mass stabbings may include kitchen knives, utility knives, sheath knives, scissors, Katanas, hammers, screwdrivers, icepicks, bayonets, axes, machetes and glass bottles. Knife crime poses security threats to many countries around the world.

A mass stabbing can be defined from a number of different perspectives. The Oxford English Dictionary defines the verb 'stab' as an action that propels a pointed weapon with the intention of harm or murder. A mass stabbing is an incident involving the use of pointed weapons to wound or kill multiple people. Mass stabbings can also be looked at from the scope of knife crime. Based on a publication by the Parliament of the United Kingdom, 'knife-enabled crime' is an incident where harm is threatened or caused with the use of bladed weapons. The media also refers to 'knife crime' as a stabbing incident or the illegal possession of knives by a person in the public.

From a legal perspective, the phrase mass killing can be used to define a mass stabbing. Based on section 2 of the Investigative Assistance for Violent Crimes Act of 2012 of the United States of America, which was signed into law and published by the US Congress on 13 January 2013, 'mass killing' is an individual occasion with three or more people murdered. Mass stabbings can also be looked at from the perspective of mass murder. The Federal Bureau of Investigation (FBI) of the United States of America has defined mass murder as an incident where four or more people are killed in a single incident on a continuing basis without any significant time period in between each of the murders.

High-profile crimes in the United States in which multiple people were stabbed are listed here. According to a database published by USA Today, as of March 5, 2024, 44 mass murders in the United States since 2006 involved a knife, and 44 involved another sharp object.

== 21st century ==
=== 2020s ===
Date	Location	Dead	Injured	Total	Description
September 12, 2026	Houma, Louisiana	4	1	5	A man stabbed people inside several homes, killing four and injuring a child.
August 19, 2026	Placer County, California	0	5	5	A man stabbed five of his coworkers at the Thunder Valley Casino Resort.
August 1, 2026	Gilbert, Arizona	3 (Note: Including the perpetrator)	1	4	Three people were stabbed inside a home before police fatally shot the perpetrator.
May 6, 2026	Richardson, Texas	1	4	5	A man stabbed four people in a restaurant after threatening to harm people. Responding police fatally shot the suspect.
February 24, 2026	Key Peninsula, Washington	5	0	5	A 32-year-old man fatally stabbed four people at a home in Key Peninsula, Washington, before being fatally shot by a deputy responding to a call regarding the man violating a no-contact order at the home.
February 21, 2026	Woodbridge, Virginia	4	1	5	Ziyi Lu, stabs her 2-year-old child, her husband, and her mother-in-law to death while injuring her father-in-law. She committed suicide after the attack.
July 26, 2025	Traverse City, Michigan	0	11	11	2025 Traverse City stabbing: Eleven people were injured in a stabbing attack in a Walmart store.
March 27, 2024	Rockford, Illinois	4	7	11	2024 Rockford stabbings: Four people were killed and seven were injured.
March 10, 2024	Mānoa, Hawaii	5	0	5	2024 Mānoa murders: Paris Oda stabbed to death his 3 children and wife before committing suicide.
July 2, 2023	Green Pond, South Carolina	6	0	6	What is being called the “Green Pond massacre” a man is accused of stabbing six people to death.
March 3, 2023	Italy, Texas	3	2	5	A woman is accused of stabbing five of her children, with three being fatally stabbed.
November 30, 2022	Buffalo Grove, Illinois	5	0	5	Andrei Kisliak, stabs his family to death before committing suicide.
November 13, 2022	Moscow, Idaho	4	0	4	2022 University of Idaho killings: Four University of Idaho students were stabbed to death with a knife or knives in a rented off-campus residence.
October 6, 2022	Las Vegas, Nevada	2	6	8	2022 Las Vegas Strip stabbings: Eight people were stabbed, two fatally, with a chef's knife on a sidewalk in front of the Wynn Casino.
September 4, 2022	Phoenix, Arizona	4	0	4	Richard Wilson stabs his parents, sister, and niece to death. He is sentenced to life imprisonment without parole.
August 22, 2022	Stewartstown, Pennsylvania	2	2	4	A mother and daughter were stabbed to death and two others were injured at a residence in Hopewell Township.
July 30, 2022	Somerset, Wisconsin	1	4	5	One person died and four others were injured after being stabbed in their midsections while tubing on the Apple River.
June 24, 2022	Paulding County, Georgia	3	4	7	A woman stabs three of her children fatally and injures her other four.
December 3, 2021	Townsend, Deleware	4	0	4	Donald Grier stabbed four members of his family to death, and is convicted of the murders and sentenced to life imprisonment.
June 2, 2021	Fort Wayne, Indiana	4	0	4	Cohen Hancz-Barron stabbed his ex-girlfriend and her three children to death. He was later sentenced to life imprisonment without parole.
July 17, 2020	Arvada, Colorado	2	3	5	A man entered a strip club with a knife and stabbed four people, killing an employee before an armed security guard shot him to death.
April 7, 2020	Knoxville County, Tennessee	4	1	5	2020 Knox County stabbing: A man stabbed four women with a knife, three fatally, at a truck stop before being shot to death by a responding police officer.
January 13, 2020	Colorado Springs, Colorado	0	8	8	The stabber injured two people near the intersection of Tejon and Boulder streets before fleeing on the walking trails of the America the Beautiful Park. As police pursued the suspect, they found several more victims throughout the park. More people were stabbed at a third location before police apprehended a suspect.

=== 2010s ===
Date	Location	Dead	Injured	Total	Description
December 28, 2019	Ramapo, New York	1	4	5	Monsey Hanukkah stabbing: A masked man broke into a home of a Hasidic Rabbi where a Hanukkah party was being held and stabbed five guests, mortally wounding one.
March 13, 2019	Sheffield, Massachusetts	4	0	4	Luke Karpinski stabs his wife and three children to death before committing suicide.
June 30, 2018	Boise, Idaho	1	8	9	2018 Boise stabbing: A homeless man stabbed nine people at a birthday party outside of an apartment complex, killing a 3-year-old girl and injuring eight others. The perpetrator was sentenced to two life prison terms plus 120 years for the attack.
May 26, 2017	Portland, Oregon	2	1	3	2017 Portland train attack: A man stabbed two people to death and injured a third on a MAX Light Rail train after being confronted for shouting anti-Muslim remarks.
November 28, 2016	Columbus, Ohio	1	13	14	Ohio State University attack: After driving into a crowd of pedestrians in his car, a lone-wolf Islamic terrorist grabbed a butcher knife and stabbed several people before being shot and killed by a police officer.
November 15, 2016	Orem, Utah	0	6	6	A 16-year-old attacked students at random with knives and a martial arts stick at Mountain View High School before being tasered and attempting to commit suicide by stabbing.
September 16, 2016	St. Cloud, Minnesota	1	10	11	2016 St. Cloud, Minnesota knife attack: A man armed with two steak knives stabbed ten people at the Crossroads Center shopping mall before he was shot to death by an off-duty police officer.
July 1, 2016	Memphis, Tennessee	4	1	5	Shanythia Gardner stabbed her 5 children, one survived while the other 4 died. She was later found guilty and sentenced to life in prison.
June 26, 2016	Sacramento, California	0	10 (Note: Seven from stabbing)	10	2016 Sacramento riot: Members of the Traditionalist Workers Party (TWP) and Golden State Skinheads rallied outside of the California State Capitol. Counter-protesters from Antifa and BAMN – armed with wooden bats, sticks, fireworks, and other weapons – confronted the other protesters. Violence ensued, resulting in ten people being hospitalized for stabbing and laceration wounds. Four people, three Antifa members and one TWP member, were arrested in connection to the riot.
June 1, 2016	Phoenix, Arizona	3	0	3	Octavia Rogers stabs her three sons to death. She is found guilty, but insane, and committed to a psychiatric hospital.
May 10, 2016	Taunton, Massachusetts	3	2	5	2016 Silver City Galleria attack: A mentally ill man broke into a house and stabbed two people, killing one. He then stole a car and crashed it into the Silver City Galleria mall, where he proceeded to stab two more people at a Bertucci's restaurant, one fatally, and assaulted three more people before being shot to death by an off-duty sheriff's deputy.
February 11, 2016	Columbus, Ohio	1	4	5	2016 Ohio restaurant machete attack: A man stabbed four people at a restaurant with a machete. After fleeing the scene in a car, police officers performed a PIT maneuver, causing him to crash. He was then shot dead by police officers after lunging at them with the machete and a filet knife.
February 2, 2016	Chicago, Illinois	6 (Note: One by gunfire)	0	6	Gage Park murders: Five family members were stabbed and a sixth was shot at their home by a man and his girlfriend during a botched robbery.
November 4, 2015	Merced, California	1	4	5	University of California, Merced stabbing attack: A lone-wolf Islamic terrorist stabbed four people with a hunting knife before being shot to death by two police officers.
October 31, 2015	Pendleton, South Carolina	4	0	4	Scott family massacre Amy Vilardi cuts the throats of four members, killing them. She is convicted of the murders and sentenced to life imprisonment without parole.
September 9, 2015	South Los Angeles, California	3	0	3	Luiz Fuentes stabs his three sons to death in their car. He is sentenced to 78 years to life imprisonment.
July 22, 2015	Broken Arrow, Oklahoma	5	1	6	Broken Arrow killings: Two brothers stabbed five members of their family to death with knives at their house and attempted to kill their younger sister.
May 23, 2014	Isla Vista, California	7 (Note: Three by stabbing; four by gunfire, including the perpetrator)	14 (Note: Seven by gunfire, seven by vehicular assault)	21	2014 Isla Vista killings: A misogynistic man fatally stabbed three men in his apartment before he shot 11 people, four fatally, and struck seven others with his car before shooting himself to death.
May 20, 2014	Torrance, California	3	0	3	Carol Coronado stabbed her three daughters to death, and was later found guilty and convicted. She was sentenced to three consecutive life terms without parole.
April 9, 2014	Murrysville, Pennsylvania	0	22	22	Franklin Regional High School stabbing: A 16-year-old student stabbed 20 students and a security guard in a hallway before classes began.
October 26, 2013	Brooklyn, New York	5	0	5	Murder of the Zhuo family: A man murdered his cousin and her children at their home by stabbing them in their necks with a butcher knife.
September 4, 2013	Spring, Texas	1	3	4	Spring High School stabbing: A 17-year-old student stabbed four people, one fatally, with a pocket knife during a fight in one of the school's hallways before being arrested.
April 9, 2013	Cypress, Texas	0	14	14	Lone Star College–CyFair stabbings: A 20-year-old student entered multiple classrooms and stabbed 14 people with an x-acto knife and scalpel before he was incapacitated by multiple students.
October 23, 2012	Rancho Cordova, California	3	0	3	Grigoriy Bukhantsov, stabs his sister-in-law and her two children to death. He pleads guilty to the murders in 2018, and is sentenced to life imprisonment.
February 11–12, 2011	New York City, New York	4	5	9	Maksim Gelman stabbing spree: A man stabbed his step-father to death following an argument before fleeing in his step fathers vehicle. He proceeded to stab eight more people until he was incapacitated by a would-be victim and arrested once police arrived.

=== 2000s ===
Date	Location	Dead	Injured	Total	Description
September 17, 2009	Collier County, Florida	6	0	6	Mesac Demas, slashes the throats of his wife and five children. He is convicted of the murders and sentenced to death.
July 18, 2009	Fayetteville, Tennessee	6	0	6	Jacob Shaffer goes on a killing spree, killing his ex-wife, his stepson, his stepson's friend, and his ex-wife's parents. He also killed a man in Alabama.
March 7, 2009	Hueytown, Alabama	4	0	4	Scott Lamar Abbott stabs four people to death and is convicted of the murders.
March 25, 2008	Sitka, Alaska	4	1	5	Jason Abbott stabs three relatives and a family friend to death and injuring another relative. He is sentenced to 140 years imprisonment.
February 20, 2008	Old Orchard Beach, Maine	3	0	3	Matthew Cushing stabs his family to death, before setting the home on fire. He is convicted of the murders and sentenced to life imprisonment.
January 8, 2008	West Reading, Pennsylvania	0	3	3	There was a stabbing incident at Antietam Middle-Senior High School where a male student attacked three other students with a knife in a hallway.
December 13, 2007	Sharonville, Ohio	4	0	4	Santiago Moreno, a Mexican national, stabbed to death his four roommates before fleeing to Mexico. He was sentenced to 120 years in Mexican prison.
May 7, 2001	Anchorage, Alaska	0	5	5	Four students were stabbed at Mountain View Elementary School at around 8:10 a.m. The suspect, who was identified as 33-year-old Jason Pritchard, was injured by police gunfire and subsequently arrested.
January 6, 2007	Huron, South Dakota	2	3	5	15-year-old Joshua Gilchrist stabbed his 49-year-old mother to death with a sword along with injuring three other people: His own sister, a foreign exchange student classmate, and a police officer who subsequently shot him dead after he attempted to tase the perpetrator.
October 6, 2006	Louisville, Kentucky	4	1	5	Said Ali Biyad slashes his four children to death and injures his wife during an argument. He is sentenced to life imprisonment.
July 17, 2006	King County, Washington	4	0	4	Connor Schierman stabs 2 woman and 2 children to death. He was sentenced to death but it was later commuted.
January 1, 2006	Woodland Heights, Virginia	4	0	4	2006 Richmond spree murders The Harvey family are the first targets of the spree. They were beaten with a hammer and had their throats cut.
June 29, 2003	Irvine, California	3	4	7	Joseph Hunter Parker, a 30-year-old schizophrenic bagger attacked people at random at the supermarket he worked at with a samurai sword before being shot and killed by responding police officers.
August 23, 2002	Warsaw, Kentucky	2	2	4	Marco Allen Chapman murders: A man entered a woman's home in Warsaw, Kentucky after asking to use the telephone, before raping and stabbing her, and stabbing three of her children, two of whom died.
August 27–28	Sioux City, Iowa	7	0	7	Adam Moss bludgeons his girlfriend and her five children to death, before going to his boss's home and bludgeoning him to death. He is apprehended and convicted of the killings.
August 20–30	Sacramento, California	7	0	7	Nikolay Soltys, goes on a stabbing rampage, killing seven members of his family, one being his unborn baby. He is charged with the murders, but is unable to stand trial as he committed suicide.
May 7, 2001	Anchorage, Alaska	0	4	4	A man stabbed and wounded four students at an elementary school before being subdued by police.
February 2, 2001	Red Lion, Pennsylvania	0	14	14	Red Lion school stabbing: A man slashed fourteen people at an elementary school with a machete before being disarmed by an injured administrator.

== 20th century ==
=== 1990s ===
Date	Location	Dead	Injured	Total	Description
May 10, 1996	Coos County, Oregon	5	0	5	Bandon massacre Girley Crum Jr. slashes the throats of his ex-girlfriend's family to death in their trailer park. He was sentenced to life in prison without the possibility of parole.
February 26, 1995	Salisbury, Pennsylvania	3	0	3	Freeman family murders Brothers Bryan and David Freeman and their cousin, Ben Birdwell, murder Bryan and David's parents and their brother.
October 24, 1994	Riverside, California	3	0	3	Dora Luz Buenrostro slashes her three children to death. She is convicted of the slayings and sentenced to death.
May 16, 1992	Oklahoma City, Oklahoma	5	0	5	Danny Keith Hooks stabs to death five sex workers. He is later convicted of 5 life sentences.
February 12, 1992	Columbia Missouri	3	0	3	Ernest Lee Johnson murders three convenience store employees with a hammer and a screwdriver. He was sentenced to death and executed.
November 17, 1991	Salt Lake County, Utah	4	0	4	Margaret Kastanis bludgeons and stabs her 3 children to death before stabbing herself in the heart.

=== 1980s ===
Date	Location	Dead	Injured	Total	Description
September 1, 1989	Warwick, Rhode Island	3	0	3	Craig Price stabs three members of the Heaton family to death.
April 14, 1989	Sonoma County, California	7	2	9	Ramon Salcido goes on a stabbing and shooting spree, slashing the throats of five of his family members and shot and killed his wife and coworker.
April 15, 1988	Bexar County, Texas	4	0	4	Leopoldo Narvaiz Jr. stabs to death his ex-girlfriend and her three siblings to death. He is sentenced to death and executed in 1998.
February 18, 1988	Rochester, Minnesota	4	0	4	David Brom uses an axe and kills his parents and his siblings.
June 30, 1985	Orange County, Florida	4	0	4	Jerry William Correll stabs to death his ex-wife and her family to death. He is sentenced to death and executed for the murders.
July 1, 1983	Houston, Texas	4	0	4	Malibu Grand Prix murders 3 robbers stab to death four employees at the Malibu Grand Prix. Two were sentenced to death, and were executed.
June 5, 1983	Chino Hills, California	4	1	5	Chino Hills massacre Kevin Cooper murders 3 members of the Ryen family and their house guest.

=== 1970s ===
Date	Location	Dead	Injured	Total	Description
January 7, 1978	Rockford, Illinois	6	0	6	Nelson family murders Simon Nelson bludgeons and stabs his six children to death after his wife wanted a divorce. He is sentenced to life in prison.

=== 1960s ===
Date	Location	Dead	Injured	Total	Description
June 25, 1969	Jersey City, New Jersey	8	1	9	Torres family massacre Rafael Torres bludgeons and stabs his wife, six daughters and son to death, while injuring another one.
July 13–14, 1966	Chicago, Illinois	8	0	8	Richard Speck murders: A man broke into a dormitory for student nurses and stabbed eight of them to death.
April 23, 1966	New York City, New York	6	0	6	Jose Antonio, stabs his wife and six children to death, but is never prosecuted and set free.
December 1, 1962	Topeka, Kansas	5	0	5	27-year-old Anne Fitzgibbons, cuts the throats of her four children before committing suicide.
May 6, 1962	Zion, Illinois	6	0	6	Roland Bauer slashes his wife and children to death before committing suicide.

=== 1950s ===
Date	Location	Dead	Injured	Total	Description
March 10, 1950	Cairo, Georgia	5	0	5	Hattie May Turner uses a knife and axe to kill her husband, three children, and her neighbor. She was held for trial, but committed suicide.

=== 1930s ===
Date	Location	Dead	Injured	Total	Description
November 24, 1932	Seattle, Washington	6	13	19	Julian Marcelino murders: A Filipino immigrant goes on a stabbing spree in Seattle's chinatown district.
June 21, 1931	Glens Falls, New York	3	1	4	Ruth Bearce afraid of going to an Asylum, cuts the throats of her three children, and does her, but survives her suicide attempt. She is sent to an Asylum.

=== 1920s ===
Date	Location	Dead	Injured	Total	Description
May 24, 1929	Lebanon, Kentucky	4	0	4	Mamie Shoaf, Distressed over financial issues, slashes the throats of her 3 children before committing suicide.
December 12, 1927	Hennessey, Oklahoma	7	0	7	Phillip Millis clubs his wife and five children to death before committing suicide.
February 11–12, 1927	Utica, New York	7	0	7	Guy Taylor cuts the throats of his wife and his five children. He then commits suicide.

=== 1900s ===
Date	Location	Dead	Injured	Total	Description
September 30, 1905	Cambridge, Illinois	8	0	8	Julia Markham, clubs her seven children to death with an axe, before committing suicide by lighting herself on fire.
March 12, 1903	Bellefontaine Neighbors, Missouri	8	0	8	August Kraus, a wealthy farmer, cuts the throats of his wife and six children, before committing suicide.
June 5, 1901	Somerville, Massachusetts	5	3	8	John Murphy goes mad and stabs eight of his coworkers killing five.
March 3, 1901	Barre, Massachusetts	6	0	6	Elizabeth Naramore cuts the throats of her six children. She is found not guilty by reason of insanity.
