= Murder of Sonya Massey =

2024 police murder of a Black woman in Illinois, U.S.

- Massey in an undated photograph
- Location: 39°45′46″N 89°37′49″W; Woodside Township, Sangamon County, Illinois, U.S.
- Date: July 6, 2024; 2 years ago 1:20 a.m. (CDT; UTC−05:00)
- Attack type: Murder by shooting, police brutality
- Victim: Sonya Lynaye Wilburn-Massey
- Perpetrator: Sean Patrick Grayson
- Charges: First-degree murder (3 counts); Aggravated battery with a firearm (dropped); Official misconduct (dropped)
- Verdict: Guilty on the lesser offense of second-degree murder
- Convictions: Second-degree murder
- Sentence: 20 years in prison

On July 6, 2024, Sonya Massey, a 36-year-old unarmed Black woman, was murdered by Sean Grayson, a 30-year-old White deputy of the Sangamon County Sheriff's Office, in Woodside Township near Springfield, Illinois, United States.

Massey had called 911 about a possible prowler in her house. Grayson and Sheriff's Deputy Dawson Farley responded and found nothing after searching the vicinity. Moving inside her house, the deputies requested her ID, and Massey began searching for it. The situation escalated quickly when Massey removed a pot of boiling water from her stove after Grayson asked for its removal. Massey lifted the pot and said twice, "I rebuke you in the name of Jesus." Grayson screamed that he would "fucking shoot [her] right in [her] fucking face," and drew his service pistol. Massey apologized and ducked behind a counter. Grayson then shot at her three times, fatally wounding Massey with one shot in the head.

Grayson was fired by the sheriff's office and charged with three counts of first-degree murder on July 17, 2024. He claimed self-defense at his trial, which began on October 20, 2025. On October 29, the jury found him guilty of second-degree murder. He was given the maximum sentence of 20 years in prison on January 29, 2026. However, he died in prison on August 23, having served only six months of his 20-year sentence.

== People involved ==
=== Sonya Massey ===
Sonya Lynaye Wilburn-Massey was born on February 12, 1988, and was 36 years old at the time of her death. She had a son and a daughter. Sometime prior to her death, she voluntarily checked into a 30-day inpatient treatment program in St. Louis, returning two days later. On July 4, 2024, a caller from Massey's home address called 911. "Somebody's trying to hurt me," the caller said. When the dispatcher asked who was trying to hurt her, the caller said, "A lot of them." The caller then said, "Never mind. This must not be the right number," and disconnected. It is unknown if Massey was the person who made this call.

Massey's mother, Donna Massey, had called 911 on July 5, the day before the shooting, and told the operator her daughter was experiencing mental health issues. She reported her daughter being "sporadic" and having a "mental breakdown," but stated, "she's not a danger to herself, she’s not a danger to me." Massey's mother also added, "When she gets upset, then she thinks everybody's after her, like paranoid schizophrenic." Massey's mother then said, "[Don't send] any combative policemen who are prejudiced, please," and "I'm scared of the police." Once officers arrived, Sonya Massey was in the front yard, saying, "They won't give it to me." Inside her home, Donna Massey told the responding deputy of her daughter's recent release from a mental facility. Around 10 a.m., Sonya Massey told responding officers she did not want to speak with medical professionals or seek treatment. She spoke with EMTs and behavioral health workers who later cleared her.

A few hours later, another 911 call was placed and a female voice was heard yelling that someone had broken her window, before hanging up the phone. When the 911 dispatcher called back, Massey told the dispatcher that her neighbor hit her with a brick. Massey later received treatment at St. John's Hospital. She suffered cuts from broken glass. A sheriff's deputy arrived at the hospital. Massey told the deputy her neighbor broke her SUV's windows with a brick and that she broke another window in an attempt to get away in her SUV. The deputy stated Massey "admitted to breaking her own window," and "appeared to be having some 10-96 issues", a policing code for mental health issues.

=== Sean Grayson ===
Sean Patrick Grayson was 30 years old at the time of murdering Sonya Massey. He was a Sangamon County Sheriff's Office deputy. While enlisted in the United States Army as a wheeled vehicle mechanic (private first class) at Fort Riley from May 2014 to February 2016, Grayson had a misdemeanor DUI conviction in August 2015. Grayson was discharged from the Army for "misconduct (serious offense)." It is unknown what this misconduct was. He received a general discharge. Grayson had another DUI conviction in July 2016. Grayson worked for five different Illinois police departments and sheriffs' offices between 2020 and 2023 before he was hired by the Sangamon County Sheriff's Office. Grayson, then a police officer in Kincaid, Illinois, falsely arrested a White man named Kyle Adkins in 2021. Grayson claimed that there was a warrant and evidence against Adkins, which were later proven to be non-existent.

In 2022, Grayson, then a deputy for the Logan County Sheriff's Office, was involved in a high-speed chase where he ignored orders from his superiors to terminate the pursuit. He reached speeds of 110 mph, turned off his lights and siren, and only stopped after hitting a deer. This resulted in a meeting between Grayson and his superiors about his misconduct and the possibility of firing Grayson. However, the Logan County Sheriff’s Office absolved him and never reported the misconduct. At the time of Massey's murder, Grayson resided in Riverton, Illinois. According to his lawyer in July 2024, Grayson had stage 3 colon cancer, which was diagnosed in the fall of 2023.

On August 23, 2026, Grayson died in prison from stage 4 colon cancer. He was 32.

=== Dawson Farley ===
Dawson Farley, a sheriff's deputy for the Sangamon County Sheriff's Office, was Sean Grayson's partner at the scene.

== Shooting ==
External videos
- Sangamon County Sheriff's Office July 6, 2024 OIS Incident on YouTube (36:15)

Early on the morning of July 6, 2024, Sonya Massey called 911 as she believed that someone had broken into her home. Two deputies, Sean Grayson and Dawson Farley, responded. Both deputies subsequently searched Massey's backyard and the immediate vicinity of her property, finding no evidence of any suspicious activity or persons. The deputies approached Massey's front door and Grayson knocked multiple times. After approximately three minutes from when Grayson first knocked, Massey opened the door and engaged in conversation with the deputies. The deputies informed Massey that they had not found anyone in their search while Massey used her cell phone.

As the deputies prepared to end the exchange, Grayson suddenly asked Massey if a black SUV in her driveway belonged to her. Massey replied that the vehicle was not hers. Farley then walked around the side of Massey's house to report the license plate number of the vehicle in her driveway. Massey and Grayson continued to engage in conversation. After Farley walked back to Massey's front door, the three entered Massey's residence.

Inside the home, Massey had a phone call with a 911 dispatcher. Massey repeatedly told the dispatcher to "hold on" before the dispatcher disconnected. As Farley looked around the residence, Massey can be seen looking through a small stack of papers and her purse. At one point, Massey asked Grayson to hand her a Bible. Grayson asked Massey for her name, discussed the vehicle parked in her driveway, then asked for her ID. Massey said that she had some "paperwork" and wanted to show it to the deputies. However, Grayson and Farley insisted that she show her ID first. While Massey searched for her ID, Grayson asked someone to remove a pot of water sitting on the stove. Massey then picked it up.

After Massey picked up the pot of water and walked from her stove to her sink, Farley and Grayson moved backward. Massey asked the deputies, "Where are you going?"; Grayson replied, "Away from your hot steaming water," chuckling. "Away from my hot steaming water? [Oh], I rebuke you in the name of Jesus," Massey said. "Huh?" Grayson asked, before Massey repeated, "I rebuke you in the name of Jesus." Grayson replied, "You better fucking not. I swear to God I'll fucking shoot you right in your fucking face," then drew his gun. Farley also drew his gun.

Massey immediately apologized by saying "OK, I'm sorry," then ducked behind the kitchen counter. However, both deputies advanced from the living room toward the kitchen with their weapons trained on Massey. After several seconds of shouting orders for Massey to drop the pot of water, Grayson fired three shots at her, fatally wounding her with one shot in the face. Several news publications have reported that Massey was unarmed at the time of the shooting. Grayson activated his body camera after shooting Massey. Farley had his body camera on when he first arrived.

Farley began to leave to grab his medical kit. However, Grayson discouraged him from doing so, stating, "She's done. You can go get it, but that's a headshot." Grayson later went to get his medical kit while Farley held dish towels to her head wound. Once Grayson returned with the kit, he asked if there was anything he could do, to which he was told no. "I'm not even gonna [sic] waste my med stuff then," Grayson replied before throwing the medical kit on the floor. Massey was later pronounced dead at 1:47 a.m. at St. John's Hospital in Springfield.

Body camera footage of the shooting was released to the public on July 22, 2024.

== Aftermath ==
In the aftermath of the shooting, the Sangamon County Sheriff's Office opened an investigation of the incident, which was turned over to the Illinois State Police. The investigation was completed within 10 days. A review by Illinois State Police found Grayson not justified in his use of deadly force. He was later fired from the Sangamon County Sheriff's Office on July 17, the same day charges were filed against him. Farley was placed on administrative leave.

Massey's family retained Ben Crump, a prominent civil rights attorney who has represented several other victims of high-profile instances of police brutality, including George Floyd and Breonna Taylor. Massey's father criticized the sheriff's office for hiring Grayson despite the "serious blemishes on his record." Additionally, her family said that police had initially blamed Massey's death on both suicide and a neighbor.

County Sheriff Jack Campbell announced he would retire on August 31, 2024, due to the shooting. He was replaced in his role by former patrol officer and detective Paula Crouch the following month. In February 2025, Massey's family reached a settlement with Sangamon County for a payment of $10 million. Massey's family also created a GoFundMe, which raised $529,000 of the $600,000 goal. In May 2025, the Illinois House passed House Bill 1953, or "Sonya Massey's Bill", requiring more thorough background checks before police officers are hired.

=== Autopsy ===
The autopsy report on Massey was released on July 26, 2024. The report confirmed Massey's death to be a homicide. The report concluded that Massey was shot beneath her left eye. The bullet exited the back of her neck. It caused a skull fracture, pierced her carotid artery, and caused bleeding in her brain. The report also revealed minor blunt force injuries to her right leg. The toxicology results found that Massey had gabapentin and delta-9-THC in her system.

=== DOJ investigation ===
On July 23, 2024, the United States Department of Justice (DOJ) confirmed that it was "assessing the circumstances" of Massey's death. Ben Crump announced the DOJ was investigating that same day. However, the civil rights investigation officially began in November 2024. The DOJ would investigate the Sangamon County Sheriff's Office, Sangamon County Central Dispatch, and the county itself. The DOJ reached an agreement with Sangamon County on January 16, 2025. Sangamon County did not admit any liability by entering into the agreement with the DOJ.

The DOJ found no instances of discrimination, but required the sheriff's office and central dispatch to make biannual reports of any complaints they receive. The sheriff's office and central dispatch would also introduce additional training, such as de-escalation techniques with behavioral health disabilities. The agreement would also require the creation of a mobile crisis team that includes trained behavioral health staff.

== Criminal trial ==
On July 17, 2024, a grand jury indicted Grayson on three counts of first-degree murder, one count of aggravated battery with a firearm, and one count of official misconduct. He was held in jail without bail. Grayson pled not guilty on July 18. His attorneys had argued for his pretrial release, appealing to the Supreme Court of Illinois, which denied the petition for release on bond. Sangamon County State's Attorney John Milhiser's review did "not support a finding that… Grayson was justified in his use of deadly force." Prosecutors compared him to "an officer intentionally and unnecessarily putting himself in front of a moving vehicle and then justifying use of force because of fear of being struck." Grayson was transferred to Macon County Jail from Menard County Jail on October 29, 2024. He was also transferred to Sangamon County Jail from Macon County Jail on July 23, 2025.

The criminal trial for Grayson commenced on October 20, 2025, in Peoria County, with opening statements beginning two days later. On October 20, 12 jurors were selected. The jury was made up of nine white women, two white men, and one black man. The lesser charges, aggravated battery with a firearm and official misconduct, were dropped on October 21.

=== Testimony ===
Farley testified against Grayson on October 22, stating, "She never did anything that made me think she was a threat," and that it was Grayson's actions that raised his "sense of awareness." Grayson took the stand on October 27 and testified in his own defense. He claimed that he took "I rebuke you in the name of Jesus" as a threat and believed Massey was going to throw the pot of water at him. Grayson was equipped with a Taser, but claimed that he did not use it because he thought Massey's clothing would make it ineffective.

=== Verdict ===
Closing arguments were heard on October 28. On October 29, Grayson was found guilty of second-degree murder. The jury deliberated for more than 11 hours, over the course of two days, before reaching a verdict.

=== Sentencing ===
On January 29, 2026, Grayson's sentencing hearing began. John Milhiser, Sangamon County's state's attorney, asked for Grayson to be given the maximum sentence, stating, "If the max were more, we would ask for more." Defense attorney Mark Wykoff warned that imprisonment would endanger Grayson's health, as his colon cancer had worsened and spread, stating, "Grayson was diagnosed with Stage 3 colon cancer in 2023," and "That has now spread to his liver, and now he has Stage 4 cancer, separate and apart from the Stage 4 colon cancer, in the form of rectal cancer, and cancer to his liver and cancer to his lungs." However, the judge did not find any evidence that Grayson's cancer treatment would be different in prison compared to the outside.

Massey's mother, Donna Massey, her father, James Wilburn, and her two children all made statements at the sentencing. Massey's daughter, Summer, told the court, "Since her death, I have not been the same person." Massey's son, Malachi, told the judge, "My soul is ripped. It's like a part of me is really dead." Wilburn told the court that he is bent, but he is not broken and that his family continues to suffer from her loss, stating, "I'm bent today, but not broken. My family will forever suffer for losing Sonya." Donna told the court, "I cried every day. I lost my short-term memory. Today, I'm afraid to call the police for fear that I may end up like Sonya," and "She was one of the smartest, sweetest people I ever knew."

Grayson was sentenced to the maximum of 20 years in prison. In addition, Grayson was given two years of supervised release. With the time he had already served in jail, and with the possibility of a sentence reduction for good behavior, he could have been released after serving 8 1/2 years, around 50 percent of his sentence. During the sentencing, he expressed remorse, stating, "I made a lot of mistakes that night. There were points when I should've acted, and I didn't. I froze," and "I made terrible decisions that night. I'm sorry."

On August 23, 2026, Grayson died from complications due to colon cancer after being denied medical release from prison in July.

== Historical connection ==
According to Massey's family, one of her ancestors, William Donnegan, was lynched in the Springfield race riot of 1908 and pronounced dead in the same hospital as Massey. The 1908 riot led to the founding of the National Association for the Advancement of Colored People (NAACP). Massey's relative stated: "The more things change, the more they stay the same."

== Reactions ==
=== U.S. politicians ===
President Joe Biden stated, "When we call for help, all of us as Americans – regardless of who we are or where we live – should be able to do so without fearing for our lives," and that Massey "should be alive today." Vice President Kamala Harris said, "I join President Biden in commending the swift action of the State's Attorney's Office and in calling on Congress to pass the George Floyd Justice in Policing Act, a bill that I coauthored in the Senate." She also stated that Massey "deserved to be safe," and that "she was tragically killed in her own home at the hands of a responding officer sworn to protect and serve."

Illinois Governor JB Pritzker condemned the murder, stating that he was "enraged that another innocent black woman had her life taken from her at the hands of a police officer," and that he was "grateful to the Springfield State's Attorney's office for bringing the appropriate charges in this case." He later called for Sheriff Jack Campbell to resign. Illinois Senator Dick Durbin stated that his "thoughts are with the family and loved ones of Sonya Massey," and that "The Illinois State Police conducted a thorough investigation of Sonya's tragic death, and the Sangamon County State's Attorney brought the necessary charges in a timely way."

U.S. Representative Nikki Budzinski, said that she was "shocked, horrified, and heartbroken" by the footage and called Massey's murder an "act of senseless and unjustifiable violence." Springfield Mayor Misty Buscher stated, "I want to make it unequivocally clear that this Sangamon County deputy's actions do not reflect the values and integrity of our Springfield Police Department," and "There is no excuse for this violent act. And we demand accountability and justice for Sonya."

=== Others ===
Springfield, Illinois announced an increased police presence in response to the murder and subsequent protests by Massey's family and supporters. Protests were held in the United States, including Chicago, Hartford, New York City, and Atlanta. The NAACP released a statement that blamed politicians for "empowering" Grayson and advocated for the George Floyd Justice in Policing Act. Michael Arceneaux stated that Massey's murder was not surprising: "When don't we hear of a white officer shooting a Black person?" The 19th said it was "a striking example of how police encounters for Black people—even those who call the police for help—quickly erupt into violence."

== See also ==
- Lists of killings by law enforcement officers in the United States
- List of killings by law enforcement officers in the United States, July 2024
- List of unarmed African Americans killed by law enforcement officers in the United States
- List of law enforcement officers convicted of an on-duty killing in the United States
- List of homicides in Illinois
