= Las Vegas shooting (disambiguation) =

The 2017 Las Vegas shooting was a mass shooting during a music festival that killed 60 people and injured 867 others. As of 2026 it is the deadliest mass shooting in the United States by a lone perpetrator.

Las Vegas shooting may also refer to:

- The murder of rapper Tupac Shakur, 1996
- A mass shooting by Zane Floyd, 1999
- Las Vegas courthouse shooting, 2010
- 2014 Las Vegas shootings, a domestic terrorism incident where a married couple killed two police officers and a civilian before being killed
- 2023 University of Nevada, Las Vegas shooting

== See also ==
- 2022 Las Vegas Strip stabbings, a mass stabbing that killed two women and injured 6 others
