= List of killings by law enforcement officers in the United States, July 2024 =

This is a list of people reported killed by non-military law enforcement officers in the United States in July 2024, whether in the line of duty or not, and regardless of reason or method. The listing documents the occurrence of a death, making no implications regarding wrongdoing or justification on the part of the person killed or officer involved. Killings are arranged by date of the incident that caused death. Different death dates, if known, are noted in the description. The table below lists 118 people.

== July 2024 ==
Date	Name (age) of deceased	Race	Location	Description
2024-07-31	Elizabeth Byrd (43)	Unknown	Mesa, Arizona	Detective John Byrd strangled his wife to death during a domestic dispute.
2024-07-31	Pedro Meza Diaz (50)	Hispanic	Rosemead, California	A pursuit ensued after the suspect refused to stop for reckless driving. At some point after the chase, police shot and killed the suspect.
2024-07-31	Brennan Russell (29)	White	Wichita, Kansas	Officers conducted a traffic stop at a McDonald's parking lot. When officers attempted to detain the suspect, a fight broke out. The suspect allegedly managed to gain control of his firearm in the rear passenger seat of his car and shot himself. An officer then opened fire on him, killing him. A coroner determined that Russell would have died from his self-inflicted gunshot wound, but that the officer's gunfire "accelerated his death."
2024-07-31	William Sparkman (23)	White	Deer Park, Texas	Deer Park police responded to a report of a man banging on car windows while holding knives. During the encounter, a taser was deployed but it was ineffective to the suspect. The suspect then reportedly charged with the knife at the officers, forcing them to shoot him.
2024-07-30	Patrick Frank Whitten (31)	White	Price, Utah	A man was fatally shot after three law enforcement agencies responded to a domestic violence call. During the encounter Whitten refused to put down his gun and had reportedly raised it towards the officers.
2024-07-30	James Jaramillo (19)	Hispanic	Pueblo, Colorado	Officers responded to multiple shots fired call. Upon arrival, the suspect barricaded himself in a residence and fired at the officers. At least one officer returned fire and killed the suspect.Police said Jaramillo was the prime suspect of multiple local homicides.
2024-07-30	Weston Derby (45)	White	Des Moines, Iowa	Durby was shot and killed after a police chase and allegedly pointed a gun at the officers. An officer reportedly sustained serious injuries due to friendly fire.
2024-07-30	Gawon Kaerey Benson (31)	Black	Fort Wayne, Indiana	A man was wanted in DeKalb County after he got out of their custody. About 30 minutes later, FWPD officers found the suspect on the Purdue University Fort Wayne campus and shot and killed him. The man was reportedly armed with a handgun and didn't follow the officers' commands.
2024-07-29	Adam Cygan (50)	Unknown	Littleton, Colorado	Officers responded to a call and encountered Cygan with a weapon. They then discharged their firearms, killing him.
2024-07-29	Lavell Adams (31)	Black	Los Angeles, California	Four burglary suspects broke into a home. Officers arrested three of them, however, the fourth barricaded himself in the home and tried to set it on fire. During the encounter, the suspect reportedly charged at the officers and was fatally shot.
2024-07-28	Jeffrey Lee Miller (42)	White	Vero Beach, Florida	Miller was shot to death by an Indian River County Sheriff's deputy after reportedly attempting to attack him with a knife.
2024-07-28	David Taylor (62)	White	Fort Pierce, Florida	While responding to an alleged burglary, police encountered a man with a weapon in his hand. The man refused when officers told him to drop the weapon, leading officers to fatally shoot him. The weapon was later revealed to be a taser.
2024-07-28	Victoria G. Lee (26)	Asian	Fort Lee, New Jersey	A man called the police when his sister was experiencing mental health crisis and needed to be sent to the hospital. As they arrived, they encountered two women in the apartment, and told them not to come in. Officers complied and stood outside. At some point, they opened the door and the suspect reportedly approached them and an officer shot and killed the suspect. A knife was found at the scene. Lee's brother said his sister had been holding a small pocketknife, but had dropped it and was holding a water bottle by the time she was shot.
2024-07-28	Willie Thomas Lovett (54)	Black	Greene County, North Carolina	Deputies responded to a breaking and entering in progress. As they arrived, they encountered the resident and learned that the suspect was still inside the residence. When they encountered the suspect, Lovett, a fight reportedly ensued and they fatally shot him.
2024-07-28	Jorge Chacon-Gutierrez (25)	Hispanic	San Antonio, Texas	Chacon-Gutierrez was shot to death after he allegedly wounded a police officer during a domestic violence incident.
2024-07-28	Courtney Alexander (34)	Black	Dyersburg, Tennessee	Officers responded to a man threatening harm on himself at his home. Alexander was reportedly found with a gun and was shot and killed after he pointed it at the officers.
2024-07-27	Stephan Allan Williams (39)	Unknown	Newport News, Virginia	During a high risk traffic stop on suspects suspected of robbing a bank, Williams, one of the armed bank robbery suspects, got out of the back seat and allegedly pointed a gun at officers. Officers then fatally shot him.
2024-07-27	Phillip Allen Baldwin (31)	White	Satsuma, Florida	Deputies pulled over a carjacking suspect, who ran off. While responding officers were chasing the suspect, he attempted to grab a gun from his pocket, which led officers to fatally shoot him.
2024-07-26	Jesus Pacheco Ceniceros (21)	Unknown	San Antonio, Texas	A three-vehicle crash involving a SAPD officer left a motorcyclist dead and two others injured.
2024-07-25	Darrell Lawayne Esau II (32)	Black	DeValls Bluff, Arkansas	U.S. Marshals identified Esau, who was wanted for first-degree and attempted murder. When they attempted to arrest him, he fired 169 rounds at the officers and was shot and killed.
2024-07-25	Yoel Napoles Ravelo (32)	Hispanic	Louisville, Kentucky	Ravelo was shot after approaching officers with a knife and a bible. Non-lethal methods were deployed but they were ineffective.
2024-07-25	Jonathan Aaron Wood (40)	Unknown	Crestone, Colorado	A deputy pulled over a man whom he recognized due to having active warrants. During the stop, the man got out of the car and attacked the deputy with a metal pipe. The deputy pulled out his service weapon and shot and killed him.
2024-07-25	Segus Jolivette (35)	Black	Lafayette, Louisiana	During an armed stand-off, an officer mistakenly shot Corporal Jolivette, a member of the responding SWAT team. The subject of the stand-off was charged with murder for Jolviette's death.
2024-07-24	Kenneth Brandon MacArthur Woods (36)	Black	Benbrook, Texas	
2024-07-24	Jesse D. Wray (25)	White	Salina, Kansas	KHP troopers and SWAT team arrested several suspects in a detached garage. One of the suspects, Wray, opened fire and was fatally shot.
2024-07-24	Timothy McDonald (48)	Unknown	Buckley, Washington	
2024-07-24	unidentified male	Unknown	Thornton, Colorado	When officers encountered and approached a man suspected to be involved in an assault, a fight broke out. During the struggle, the man allegedly grabbed an officer's gun and shot the officer. Another officer then returned fire, killing him. The wounded officer sustained “serious but non-life-threatening injuries.”
2024-07-23	Matthew Austin Gullo (31)	Unknown	Williston, North Dakota	Gullo, allegedly armed with a knife, was shot and killed by police during the encounter.
2024-07-23	Ramon De Jesus Blanco (64)	Unknown	Miami, Florida	Police shot and killed Blanco, who was shooting in the air and towards buildings.
2024-07-22	Anthony J. Previte (29)	Unknown	Kensington, New Hampshire	Officers received a report of a man with mental illness threatening other people in a residence. Upon arrival, officers encountered the armed man and six of them opened fire, killing him.
2024-07-22	Matthew Paul Barry (41)	Unknown	Florence, South Carolina	When police officers were attempting to serve a warrant at an apartment, the suspect barricaded himself inside. After an exchange of gunfire, the suspect was found dead.
2024-07-22	Pierre Ramseur (33)	Black	Catawba County, North Carolina	Ramseur was wanted for several crimes in the county when he was confronted by deputies at the business where he worked. Ramseur then reportedly rammed several patrol cars with his vehicle before he was shot and killed.
2024-07-22	Preston Graham (29)	Black	Corpus Christi, Texas	
2024-07-21	Alexander Antonio Lopez (28)	Unknown	San Francisco, California	SFPD officers responded to an armed robbery. During the encounter, they shot and killed an armed suspect.
2024-07-21	Clayton Pierce (42)	Unknown	Fort Collins, Colorado	Officers found a man armed with a gun outside a vehicle. After a shootout, Pierce shot and injured an officer. He then ran to a nearby by cemetery and was killed during an exchange of gunfire. Pierce was connected to a 2019 cold case homicide by police.
2024-07-21	Donald Wilson (46)	Unknown	Peoria, Illinois	Wilson was shot and killed after reportedly swinging a shovel at officers.
2024-07-21	Richard C. Smith (68)	Unknown	Mineral County, Montana	A man who was a suspect in a stabbing and kidnaping was fatally shot after he reportedly refused to obey commands.
2024-07-20	Cody Dodd-Thompson (33)	White	West Hollywood, California	LASD received a report of an attempt robbery at a 7-Eleven. Upon arrival, they identified the suspect and attempt to put him into custody. The suspect then allegedly pulled out a handgun, and was shot by the deputies.
2024-07-20	Marques Hasbrouck (22)	White	Virginia Beach, Virginia	A man was shot and killed by police after purportedly stabbing 3 people. One person was dead and two others are in critical condition.
2024-07-20	unidentified male (27)	Hispanic	Houston, Texas	HPD responded after a knife-wielding man attempted to stab someone. When the officers arrived, a foot chase ensued and one officer shot the suspect, resulting his death.
2024-07-20	Jason Moore (42)	White	Biloxi, Mississippi	After responding to a call, officers encountered Moore, who allegedly pointed a gun at them. He was then fatally shot.
2024-07-19	Deshaun Albert Dunmyer (31)	Black	Pine Hills, Florida	Dunmyer allegedly shot and stabbed his child's mother and held his child hostage with a gun. SWAT team members then shot and killed him. The child's mother was in critical condition and the child was unharmed.
2024-07-19	unidentified male	Unknown	Hialeah, Florida	
2024-07-19	unidentified male	Unknown	Colville, Washington	
2024-07-19	unidentified male	Unknown	Waikiki, Hawaii	
2024-07-19	unidentified male	Unknown	Riverside County, California	The Riverside County Parks rangers contact the sheriff's Riverside County Sheriff's Department about an armed man near the Santa Ana River. When Riverside County Sheriff's located the man, who was reportedly armed with a machete and large metal pipe, they allegedly ordered the man to drop the weapons, but he allegedly didn't comply. An unknown less-lethal-device was used on the man; before the man was shot by a deputy.
2024-07-19	Gregory Neal Carlson (48)	White	Forest Hills, Pennsylvania	A Churchill Police Officer fatally shot Carlson, who was reportedly armed with a firearm, at a house in Forest Hills after responding to reports of a disturbance.
2024-07-18	John Thompson (42)	Unknown	Mancos, Colorado	Montezuma County deputies received a report that Thompson was “armed and acting crazy.” Upon arrival, Thompson reportedly approached officers with a rifle and was shot and killed.
2024-07-18	Matthew Walsh (35)	Unknown	Tempe, Arizona	A man who was wanted by the police was shot to death by US Marshals on Friday. Few details were released.
2024-07-18	Nicholas Owen Reed (44)	Unknown	Botetourt County, Virginia	A police chase ensued after the driver of the motorcycle refused to stop during a traffic stop. As the driver attempted to exit the parkway, the motorcycle crashed into a closed gate. He was then fatally shot after allegedly pointing a gun at a trooper. The passenger of the motorcycle was injured due to the crash.
2024-07-17	Brandon Bowie Jr. (14)	Black	Greensboro, North Carolina	One Greensboro police officer spotted that a car was driving the wrong way. He attempted to stop the car, however, it sped off. The car then collided with one of the responding cruiser at 130 mph. The suspects’ vehicle caught on fire and killed three juveniles and the officer sustained serious injuries.
2024-07-17	Kenyan Saxton-Reese (14)	Black	Greensboro, North Carolina	One Greensboro police officer spotted that a car was driving the wrong way. He attempted to stop the car, however, it sped off. The car then collided with one of the responding cruiser at 130 mph. The suspects’ vehicle caught on fire and killed three juveniles and the officer sustained serious injuries.
2024-07-17	Derrion Legrand (15)	Black	Greensboro, North Carolina	One Greensboro police officer spotted that a car was driving the wrong way. He attempted to stop the car, however, it sped off. The car then collided with one of the responding cruiser at 130 mph. The suspects’ vehicle caught on fire and killed three juveniles and the officer sustained serious injuries.
2024-07-17	Victoria Carter (37)	White	Medina, Ohio	A deputy and a sheriff confronted a woman with a replica gun and a knife. A taser was deployed but it was ineffective. Then, the woman purportedly charged at them with the knife. The sheriff then shot Carter, killing her.
2024-07-16	Joshua Everett Emmett (45)	White	Alto, Georgia	Sheriff's deputies shot and killed two people while serving a warrant on Emmett, a registered sex offender, for violating his parole.
2024-07-16	Meagan Victoria Feaster (33)	White	Alto, Georgia	Sheriff's deputies shot and killed two people while serving a warrant on Emmett, a registered sex offender, for violating his parole.
2024-07-16	Samuel Sharpe Jr (43)	Black	Milwaukee, Wisconsin	Five Columbus Division of Police officers shot and killed Sharpe near King Park on Milwaukee's West Side. Sharpe's killing gained extensive media coverage due to its proximity to the Republican National Convention venue. The officers were a part of a group of officers from other cities assisting with security during the RNC.
2024-07-16	Albert Melendez (32)	Hispanic	Thompson, New York	During a pursuit, Melendez attempted to turn his car in an intersection. A trooper on the scene ordered him to stop, however, when he reportedly drove toward and hit the trooper, the trooper shot him. The trooper sustained minor injuries.
2024-07-15	Michael Guy (39)	Black	Marion, Indiana	Police officers were attempting to arrest Guy in a home due to an outstanding warrant. A physical altercation ensued and Guy allegedly disarmed one of the officers. Another officer then shot and killed him.
2024-07-15	Steven Kissack (35)	White	Juneau, Alaska	Police approached Kissack, a homeless man, in connection with an assault that had occurred the previous day. Following a standoff, four Juneau Police officers and one Alaska Wildlife Trooper shot Kissack as he walked towards them holding a knife.
2024-07-15	Charles Carrol (68)	White	Beaumont, Texas	Police were conducting a welfare check on a possibly suicidal man when the man emerged with a gun. Officers shot the man who succumbed to his injuries.
2024-07-15	Dante Cudini (38)	White	Graham, Washington	
2024-07-15	Victor Miles Stevens	White	Calhoun, Georgia	A police officer attempted to pull over a driver involved in an illegal drug distribution, but the driver refused, commencing a pursuit. Police performed a PIT maneuver on the vehicle, during which the driver of the fleeing car was killed.
2024-07-15	Jacob Bible (25)	White	Carrollton, Ohio	FBI agents shot and killed Bible at the home he shared with his mother. Few details were immediately released.
2024-07-14	unidentified male	Unknown	Micanopy, Florida	A man was shot and killed by police after a police chase in which he hit several vehicles.
2024-07-14	Mark Hunter (73)	Unknown	Lealman, Florida	A man lying on the road was struck and killed by a Pinellas County Sheriff's deputy.
2024-07-14	Marcus Lewis (28)	Native American	Gila River Indian Community, Arizona	
2024-07-13	Joseph Earl Driver (35)	Unknown	Tuscaloosa, Alabama	
2024-07-13	Ricardo Ramirez (18)	Hispanic	Los Angeles, California	An officer in an unmarked vehicle followed a Cadillac after seeing its occupants get into a dispute with another vehicle. After the Cadillac stopped, Ramirez and another man exited the vehicle and approached the police car, which had tinted windows. The officer shot Ramirez, who was unarmed, through the window.
2024-07-13	Daniel Scott McGoldrick (35)	Unknown	Easley, South Carolina	Officers responded to a domestic incident. Upon arrival, McGoldrick came out the home and reportedly pointed a weapon at them, at which point, at least one officer opened fire, fatally striking him.
2024-07-13	Thomas Matthew Crooks (20)	White	Butler, Pennsylvania	Secret Service agents shot and killed a person who attempted to assassinate former president Donald Trump during a campaign rally in Pennsylvania. One spectator was killed and three people, including Trump, were injured in the shooting.
2024-07-12	Sherman Lee Butler (45)	Black	Detroit, Michigan	A tenant was shot and killed after he allegedly lunged toward a bailiff.
2024-07-12	Matthew Dylan Lucht (24)	White	Muskogee, Oklahoma	Muskogee County deputies were called to Coco Bongos Gentlemen's Club after reports of an armed robbery. According to news sources, when deputies arrived at the establishment, they encountered Lucht. A shootout allegedly transpired between Lucht and the deputies, whice resulted in Lucht getting fatally shot.
2024-07-12	unidentified male	Unknown	Midlothian, Texas	The man threatened his family members with "violence and death." A pursuit ensued after the man fled in a car. About thirty minutes later, the man rammed into two patrol cars and fired a weapon, he then was shot and killed by return fire.
2024-07-12	Tristan James Robert Mayberry (19)	White	Orlando, Florida	Police were conducting surveillance on a house with gang members suspected of multiple crimes, and an individual left the house holding a gun. The police followed the man into a 7-Eleven. Deputies made contact and the man refused to stop, then made a move toward the gun in his waistband, which led officers to shoot and kill him.
2024-07-12	Henry Maynard (19)	White	Winter Haven, Florida	
2024-07-11	Glenn Dawson (74)	Unknown	Loxley, Alabama	
2024-07-11	James John Fox (40)	Unknown	White County, Tennessee	
2024-07-11	Nathaniel Mark Crabtree (37)	White	Bentonville, Arkansas	Police responded to a report of a man assaulting women at a local park. The suspect was shot and transported to a hospital, where he succumbed to his injuries.
2024-07-11	Dashawn Sanchez Samuels (20)	Black	Elkin, North Carolina	
2024-07-11	Mark Hayden Jr. (37)	White	Sulphur, Louisiana	
2024-07-10	Carlos D. Atilano (26)	Unknown	Nashville, Tennessee	According to police, When Sgt. Trevor VonDohlen was driving his cruiser, a Toyota Camry veered into his lane of travel, causing a head-on crash. The Toyota driver, Atilano, died at the scene.
2024-07-10	unidentified male (20)	Unknown	Muskegon, Michigan	
2024-07-10	Luis Florez	Hispanic	Los Angeles, California	
2024-07-10	Dae'von Roberts (25)	Black	Buffalo, New York	Roberts was pulled over for excessive speeding and tinted windows. After receiving an invalid license, the officer opened the driver side door, and at some point, Roberts accelerated his car, causing the officer to hang on the doorframe. Roberts attempted to kick the officer off the car, leading to the officer shooting him multiple times. Both the suspect and the officer fell out the car, and the vehicle continued to go westbound until it bumped into the curb. The 6-year-old passenger was uninjured.
2024-07-10	Rafael Rodriguez-Aguayo (38)	Hispanic	Overton, Nevada	A park ranger shot and killed a person at Valley of Fire State Park. Few details were immediately released.
2024-07-10	Jesse Patt (37)	White	Caledonia, Wisconsin	A man dressed in black was lying on a path and was not moving. When the officers arrived, the man allegedly fired his weapon. Officers then shot and killed him.
2024-07-10	Moises Colunga Jr. (50)	Hispanic	Chula Vista, California	Police responded to a traffic accident and found a man in a severely damaged sedan. The man tried to drive away but he failed. At some point, the man flashed a gun and fired at least one shot at the officers, leading them to return fire, killing him.
2024-07-10	Joshua Keith Hughes (45)	White	Bedford, Texas	Officers were notified that cameras picked up a stolen car's plate. When officers attempted to confront the suspect, he fled the scene. When officers located him, he made suicidal remarks. The suspect attempted to escape, which officers perceived as a threat. Police then opened fire, killing the suspect.
2024-07-10	Tony Pollard (53)	Unknown	Lafayette Parish, Louisiana	A man was shot and killed while police were executing an arrest warrant for an armed robbery suspect.
2024-07-09	Sumner Howard (67)	Unknown	Mobile, Alabama	A man was killed after his motorcycle collided with a police cruiser. The officer involved, Roy Adams, also involved in three different car accidents unrelated while he was on duty this year.
2024-07-09	Juan Antonio Hernandez (52)	Hispanic	San Antonio, Texas	San Antonio SWAT officers were fired upon when apprehending a man wanted for multiple arrest warrants. In response, the man was killed.
2024-07-09	Christopher Harriman (38)	White	Old Orchard Beach, Maine	Police responded to a report of a man making suicidal threats while armed with an AR style rifle in his car, when he suddenly fled the scene. After being spotted at a convenience store, police officers tried to convince him to surrender. In response, the man loaded his rifle, and was shot and killed by police.
2024-07-08	Tyquaze Nicolas (18)	Black	Elgin, Illinois	When an off-duty officer was driving through the area, he witnessed a robbery in progress. The officer shot and killed the man after he pulled out a gun.
2024-07-08	Nicholas Elias Fernandez (26)	Hispanic	Easley, South Carolina	Police responded to a call about a man threatening physical harm to a manager at Tractor Supply Company. When they arrived, they confronted a man with a gas can and was threatening to pour gasoline on the caller's car. During the confrontation, one officer discharged his weapon, killing him.
2024-07-08	Kirk Medak (67)	White	Kasilof, Alaska	Medak was threatening to kill people with a sword. When the troopers arrived, he allegedly charged a harpoon at their vehicle twice and was shot. He was pronounced dead at the scene.
2024-07-06	Sonya Massey (36)	Black	Woodside Township, Illinois	Massey called 911 to report a prowler outside her home. Deputies responded and one ultimately shot Massey, who was holding a pot of boiling water, which they'd requested she move. Sean Grayson, who shot Massey, was charged with first-degree murder. On October 29, 2025, Grayson was found guilty of the lesser offence of second-degree murder. On January 29, 2026, Grayson was sentenced to the maximum of 20 years in prison.
2024-07-06	Dejon Marques Heard (25)	Hispanic	La Jolla, California	San Diego Police received a 9-1-1 call reporting a man was blocking the street with his car and that he was holding a knife. The suspect, identified as Dejon Heard was holding a knife. When officers gave Heard commands to drop the knife, Heard did not comply, charged at the officers, and was fatally shot.
2024-07-06	Anthony Sowell (45)	Black	Los Angeles, California	
2024-07-06	Michael Knowles (65)	Black	Fort Pierce, Florida	A biker was struck and killed by an off-duty deputy driving a cruiser.
2024-07-05	David Vang (46)	Asian	Mandeville, Louisiana	Police responded to a welfare check and reportedly heard a woman screaming inside the home. The woman ran outside and told the police that her husband Vang, was going to kill her. Vang then opened fire on her, killing her. An officer then returned fire, killing Vang.
2024-07-05	Nicholas Kemp (45)	White	West Jordan, Utah	Officers arrived at a domestic violence call when they encountered Kemp who fired at the officers, causing them to shoot him. Kemp later died overnight at a hospital.
2024-07-05	Mekalon J. Buckskin (20)	Native American	Fort Hall, Idaho	Buckskin, who sexually assaulted a 13 years old girl, was killed by police after pointing a gun at them. The FBI is currently leading the investigation.
2024-07-04	unidentified male	Unknown	Riverton, Utah	After stopping a suspect who reportedly hit and run in a parking lot, officers conducted a sobriety test. At some point, the suspect became noncompliant and shots were fired, the suspect was killed. Officials have not confirmed if the suspect has a gun or not.
2024-07-04	Timothy Jefferson (34)	Black	Dallas, Texas	Police responded to a robbery in progress call. When they arrived, officers saw the suspects run from the scene. One suspect approached him, pointing a gun at an officer, who fired at the suspect. Officer Martinez then put on his vest and activated his body-worn camera, which partially captured the shooting. The suspect was taken to a local hospital where he died from his injuries.
2024-07-04	Jimmy Lopez (26)	Hispanic	Hemet, California	Police responded to a call of an intoxicated man exiting a bar with a gun in his pants. Officers arrived as Lopez was sitting on the sidewalk and shot him 18 times. Following the shooting the gun was found to be an airsoft pistol.
2024-07-04	Pedro Felix (20)	Hispanic	Queens, New York	Police responded after a woman who was stabbed in the back ran down the street to MTA Police to ask for help. When they arrived at the luxury apartment in Jamaica, they encountered the suspect holding his father with a knife to his throat. Officers shot the suspect. The police then found a mortally wounded 8-year-old boy. Both the boy and the suspect later died at the hospital.
2024-07-04	Samson Lucas Bariah Fussner (28)	White	Yellowstone National Park, Wyoming	National Park Rangers searched for Fussner, who was reported to have threatened a woman at a lodge. Rangers eventually located him as he fired gunshots towards the Canyon Lodge dining facility with a rifle. One ranger was injured and Fussner was killed in a shoot-out. Fussner, of Milton, Florida, was employed by a private business that operated in Yellowstone.
2024-07-03	Daniel Todd Augustine (26)	White	Sioux Falls, South Dakota	A police sniper shot and killed a man who allegedly took several people hostage at a gas station.
2024-07-03	Daniel Travis Dorman	Unknown	Savannah, Georgia	A police officer fatally struck a pedestrian with his cruiser.
2024-07-02	Jeremy Bennett (36)	Black	Abilene, Texas	Bennett allegedly brandished a handgun and threatened two women. When the officers arrived, they found Bennett barricaded himself in a separate nearby residence. Swat team negotiated with him several times but he came out the residence with a gun, and reportedly pointed it at the officers. They then opened fire, killing him.
2024-07-02	Kavon Ragan (22)	Black	Oklahoma City, Oklahoma	A police sniper shot and killed a man who had shot a police officer in the hip during a barricade situation.
2024-07-02	Logan Cumberland (37)	White	Cranberry Township, Butler County, Pennsylvania	
2024-07-02	Kyle Puckett (36)	White	Evansville, Indiana	
2024-07-02	Ivan Zaystev (41)	White	Spanaway, Washington	
2024-07-02	Shakoor Quayon Williams (33)	Black	Fayetteville, North Carolina	Police arrived at Kings Cross Apartments to arrest Williams, who was a suspect in a homicide. When they arrived, Williams reportedly barricaded himself inside one of the units. Hours later, Williams exited the apartment and was killed "in an exchange of gunfire."
2024-07-01	unidentified male	Unknown	North Highlands, California	During a domestic violence situation, suspect shot a wounded a victim and barricaded himself and the victim inside the home. When officers found the suspect pointing a gun at the victim with a camera on the drone, they opened fire, killing him.
2024-07-01	unidentified male	Unknown	Cherokee, North Carolina	According to a witness, one of the officers asked the suspect to move his car, however, the suspect moved the vehicle at a very slow speed. Police then shot and killed the suspect for reasons unknown. The case is under FBI investigation.

== See also ==
- Death in custody § United States
- Henry A. Wallace Police Crime Public Database
- List of cases of police brutality
- List of countries with annual rates and counts for killings by law enforcement officers
- List of law enforcement officers killed in the line of duty in the United States
- List of law enforcement officers convicted for an on-duty killing in the United States
- List of shootings by US immigration agents
- List of police reforms related to the George Floyd protests
- List of unarmed African Americans killed by law enforcement officers in the United States
- Lists of killings by law enforcement officers
- Police brutality in the United States
- Police misconduct § United States
- Police riot § United States
- Police use of deadly force in the United States
