= Adam Moss (mass murderer) =

2001 mass murder perpetrator in Iowa, US

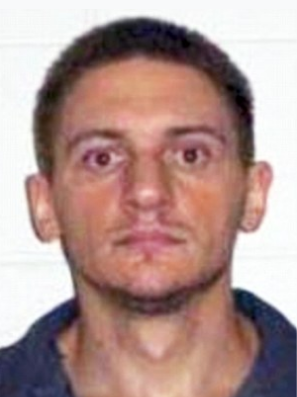
- Moss in 2001
- Born: Adam Matthew Moss; September 5, 1977; Iowa, U.S.
- Died: June 26, 2013 (aged 35); Iowa State Penitentiary, Fort Madison, Iowa, U.S.
- Cause of death: Suicide by hanging
- Motive: Unknown
- Conviction: First degree murder (7 counts)
- Penalty: Life imprisonment

Details
- Victims: 7
- Span of crimes: August 27, 2001 – August 31, 2001
- Country: United States
- State: Iowa
- Date apprehended: August 31, 2001

Adam Matthew Moss was an American mass murderer who was responsible for the murder of seven people in Sioux City, Iowa. Sometime around the late hours of August 27 or early hours of August 28, 2001, Moss entered the home of his girlfriend, Leticia Aguilar, and killed her and her 5 children. They were bludgeoned to death with a hammer while Leticia also had her throat slit. On August 30, 2001, Moss also killed his former boss, Ronald Fish. He too was killed with a hammer and knife. Moss was captured the next day following a manhunt by police. He was sentenced to seven consecutive life terms with no chance of parole. It is considered the worst mass killing committed in modern Iowa history.

== Childhood ==
Adam Moss was born on September 5, 1977. Moss would struggle with mental health issues and drugs while growing up. He also would have multiple run ins with the law. His brother, Jason Moss, filed a domestic violence charge against him and also accused him of making threatening phone calls. In 1995, Moss would be sentenced to a year probation for assault, and then again in 1997 for burglary and theft. Before the murders, Moss had been living with his girlfriend, Leticia Aguilar and her five children for couple of months. Both had worked at Smurfit-Stone Container Co, a cardboard and paper products company.

== Murders ==
Sometime around or after August 27, 2001, Moss was accused of entering his girlfriend's house and went to the children's bedrooms first. He then proceeded to kill the children as they slept, bludgeoning them to death with a hammer. He then went to Aguilars room and proceeded to beat her in the face repeatedly with a hammer and cutting her throat. Their bodies were found the next day by their babysitter Donna Stabile, who dropped by to check on them when the children were not dropped off at her home where she ran a daycare. On August 30, Moss would kill his friend and former employer Ronald E. Fish. He was also found bludgeoned to death with a hammer and stabbed with a knife. Afterwards, Moss would flee the scene by stealing Fish's car. Fish was found by Paul Yanacheak, an employee of his sisters who was sent to check on him when she hadn't heard from him. His body was found face down in the foyer of his house, with a knife still stuck in his back. A claw hammer was also found nearby. Following an all night search, Moss would be arrested on August 31 after being found hiding behind a pile of plywood near a shack that the police were monitoring.

== Trial and sentence ==
After his arrest, Moss's bail was set at $7 million while he awaited trial. Moss was indicted for the murder of Aguilar, her five children and Ron Fish. On September 10, 2001, Moss plead innocent to the seven murders he was accused of. But on September 25, 2001, Moss would eventually plead guilty to premeditated murder in all seven murders. Since Iowa did not have the death penalty, he was instead sentenced to seven consecutive life sentences with no chance for parole for his role in the crime. He was sent to the Iowa State Penitentiary in Fort Madison, Iowa. Sometime after his sentence, he was moved to a mental health unit within the Penitentiary where on June 26, 2013, Moss was found unresponsive and hanging with a bed sheet around his neck tied to a wall vent while in his cell. He was pronounced dead shortly by medical personnel. No motive was ever given for the killings.

== See also ==
Nikolay Soltys - another fugitive caught the same time as Adam Moss.
