= 2018 Boise stabbing =

2018 mass stabbing in Boise, Idaho, U.S.

- Wylie Street Station
- Location: 43.6465051°N 116.2456707°W; Boise, Idaho, U.S.
- Date: June 30, 2018; 8 years ago c. 8:46 p.m. (MDT; UTC−06:00)
- Attack type: Mass stabbing; Child murder
- Weapon: Knife
- Deaths: 1
- Injuries: 8
- Perpetrator: Timothy Kinner
- Motive: Revenge for being asked to leave the apartment in the complex
- Verdict: Pleaded guilty
- Convictions: One count of first-degree murder; Eight counts of aggravated battery; Two counts of aggravated assault; One count of possession of a deadly weapon

On June 30, 2018, a knife attack occurred at the Wylie Street Station apartment complex in Boise, Idaho, United States. A 30-year-old man named Timothy Kinner stabbed nine people. One victim, 3-year-old Ruya Kadir, died two days after the attack.

The attacker's motive was revenge because he was asked to leave a tenant's apartment in the complex.

== Stabbing ==
Kinner returned with the knife to the apartment where he was staying and found no one home. 3-year-old Kadir was celebrating her birthday just a few apartments away. He burst into her birthday party and began the attack around 8:46 p.m. Kinner grabbed Kadir, stabbed her in the heart, and threw her to the floor. Three adults who tried to stop Kinner were injured. Police arrived at the scene within four minutes of receiving calls. They found Kinner walking away from the complex and arrested him.

== Victims ==
The 3-year-old girl, Ruya Kadir, died two days after the attack. The injured included three adults, a 12-year-old, an 8-year-old, a 6-year-old, and two 4-year-olds. The victims were refugees from Ethiopia, Iraq, and Syria. They were found inside the apartment where the party was taking place and in the parking lot.

=== Memorial ===
In memory of the child who died, a garden and a small playground for children were later built on the grounds of the apartment complex.

== Perpetrator ==
Timothy Earl Kinner (born in 1988), who was 30 years old at the time of the attack, had a long criminal record. He grew up in a poor neighborhood in Memphis, Tennessee. Throughout his life, he was diagnosed with bipolar disorder and schizophrenia. Kinner had no previous connection to the victims. His motive was revenge for being asked to leave the apartment in the complex.

Kinner was invited to stay in the tenant's apartment for a few days. However, due to his bad behavior, he was asked to leave the apartment on June 29.

== Sentencing ==
In March 2021, Kinner pleaded guilty to 12 charges (one count of first-degree murder, eight counts of aggravated battery, two counts of aggravated assault and one count of possession of a deadly weapon). In June 2021, he received two life sentences without the possibility of parole. Kinner also received an additional 120 years in prison, to be served consecutively.

== See also ==
- 2018 in the United States
- List of mass stabbings by death toll
- List of mass stabbings in the United States
- List of mass stabbing incidents (2010–2019)
