= 2024 Rockford stabbings =

2024 mass stabbing in Rockford, Illinois, U.S.

- Location: Rockford, Illinois, U.S.
- Date: March 27, 2024; 2 years ago c. 1:14 p.m. – c. 1:35 p.m. (CDT)
- Attack type: Mass stabbing, home invasion, bludgeoning, vehicle-ramming
- Weapons: Knife; Chevrolet Silverado 1500; Aluminum softball bat
- Deaths: 4 (1 by bludgeoning)
- Injuries: 7 (2 by bludgeoning)
- Accused: Christian Ivan Soto
- Charges: First-degree murder (×4); Attempted first-degree murder (×7); Home invasion (×2)

On March 27, 2024, four people were killed and seven others were injured in a mass stabbing in and near Rockford, Illinois, with the fatalities entailing two men, a woman, and a 15-year-old girl. A suspect, 22-year-old Christian Ivan Soto, of Rockford, was taken into custody and charged with several counts of first-degree murder, attempted first-degree murder, and home invasion.

== Attacks ==
During an interview following his arrest, the suspect told police that he was friends with one of the victims, a 23-year-old man named Jacob D. Schupbach, and had gone to Schupbach's house to smoke marijuana. According to the suspect, he became paranoid that the drugs Schupbach gave him were laced with an unknown narcotic, after which he retrieved a knife from the kitchen and fatally stabbed Schupbach, along with Schupbach's 63-year-old mother, Ramona. Additionally, witnesses reported seeing the assailant enter a black Chevrolet Silverado and run over Jacob Schupbach before following him back into the house.

After exiting the home, the assailant fatally stabbed Jay P. Larson, a 49-year-old postal worker, whom the assailant then ran over twice as he fled in his pickup truck. At a nearby residence, the assailant stabbed a woman near her left eye as she opened the door to let their pit bull out, then wounded her adult son and daughter. The assailant fled after the woman's son struck him with a syrup bottle.

The assailant then entered the unlocked back door of another residence on the same street, where three girls on spring break had been watching movies in the basement. After asking the girls where a gun was located and yelling expletives at them, the assailant attacked all three with an aluminum softball bat he had retrieved from the kitchen. One of the girls, 15-year-old Jenna A. Newcomb, was fatally injured before the assailant eventually fled the home. The other girls, aged 15 and 14, survived. According to Newcomb's mother, she died protecting her sister and friend from further harm.

The attacks continued in another part of Winnebago County, where the assailant broke into a woman's home through a window, chased her into her yard, and attacked her with his knife, causing stab wounds to her hands and face. He then injured a man who was driving by and stopped to intervene; The assailant also attempted to steal the man's Jeep. As the assailant began attacking the man, police arrived and took him into custody, with a deputy sustaining a stab wound to his hand in the process.

== Victims ==
Four people, including a 15-year-old girl and a postal worker, were killed in the attacks, while seven others were injured. The victims were identified as 49-year-old Jay P. Larson, 15-year-old Jenna A. Newcomb, 23-year-old Jacob D. Schupbach, and 63-year-old Ramona L. Schupbach. Newcomb and the Schupbachs died at the scene, while Larson died at a hospital. The Schupbachs were the only victims Soto knew prior to the attacks.

In honor of Larson, a procession of mail trucks followed his delivery route on April 2, 2024.

== Accused ==
The only suspect in the attacks, 22-year-old Christian Ivan Soto (born November 23, 2001), of Rockford, had several traffic violations, with one incident in 2022 resulting in Soto receiving a sentence of six months of supervision. Soto had also been charged with damage to property in September 2022.

Following the attacks, Soto was charged with four counts of first-degree murder, seven counts of attempted first-degree murder, and two counts of home invasion with a dangerous weapon. Soto faces up to 60 years in prison on each count of first-degree murder and attempted first-degree murder, as well as up to 30 years in prison for each count of home invasion. Soto may also face federal charges since one of the victims was a postal worker.

Soto made his first court appearance on March 28, 2024. During a court hearing on April 2, 2024, Soto disrupted the proceedings with a verbal outburst in which he loudly exclaimed "Only God can judge me" and called those present "puppets" and "serpents". Soto's arraignment was scheduled for April 15, 2024. On that date, a Winnebago County judge ordered a psychiatric evaluation for Soto. On May 23, 2024, Soto was found fit to stand trial.

== Reactions ==
In a statement released the day after the attacks, U.S. President Joe Biden stated that he and First Lady Jill Biden were "horrified to learn of the brutal attack carried out in Rockford last night". Biden further stated that they were "praying for the families of those who lost loved ones, and hoping that all those injured make a full recovery", expressed gratitude "for the heroic actions of local law enforcement, who confronted the suspect and prevented the loss of more innocent life", and pledged that his administration "will do everything in its power to help the people of Rockford and the broader community recover from this traumatic event".

U.S. Representative Eric Sorensen, whose district covers Rockford, stated in a tweet that he was "grateful for quick actions of our police who were able to catch the suspect and prevent additional harm to our neighbors in Rockford".

Rockford's mayor, Tom McNamara, described the attacks as a "random and senseless act of violence" and stated that his heart was "breaking for those who have lost their lives, their families and our community".

== See also ==
- List of mass stabbing incidents (2020–present)
- List of homicides in Illinois
- 2024 in Illinois
