= 2022 Las Vegas Strip stabbings =

Stabbing spree in Las Vegas, Nevada, US

2022 Las Vegas Strip Stabbings
- Location: Outside: Wynn Las Vegas; Las Vegas, Nevada, United States
- Date: October 6, 2022; 11:40 – 11:42 a.m. (PST)
- Attack type: Mass stabbing
- Weapon: Kitchen knife
- Deaths: 2
- Injuries: 6
- Motive: Believed victims were "laughing at him and making fun of his clothing"
- Convicted: Yoni Christian Barrios

On October 6, 2022, a stabbing spree occurred along the Las Vegas Strip, killing two people and injuring at least six. The incident occurred in front of the Wynn Casino. It is the deadliest stabbing attack in the United States since the 2020 Knox County stabbing.

== Attack ==
Security footage shows a man entering the Wynn Casino, where he reportedly asked the janitor to contact ICE for him so he could return to his home in Guatemala. Shortly afterward, he then told a security guard at the Wynn that he was trying to sell his knives. Just before 11:40 a.m., when performers dressed as showgirls were approached by the suspect outside the hotel, he reportedly told a group of four showgirl impersonators that he was a chef at the Wynn. The suspect asked to take a picture with some of the showgirls for free, but they declined. Soon after, he proceeded to stab two of the showgirls. He then began running and attacked 6 more people — a combination of locals and tourists — before fleeing, pursued by witnesses. A man in a bloodstained chef's white jacket was arrested a short time later, and police retrieved a knife from nearby bushes that they believed had been thrown there in the retreat.

Police reported that the accused thought that his first victims were "laughing at him and making fun of his clothing", and that he continued the attack to "let the anger out".

== Perpetrator ==
The attacker was identified as 32-year-old Yoni Barrios, a Guatemalan citizen who U.S. Immigration and Customs Enforcement believe entered the United States without passing through a border checkpoint. KSNV obtained records of a 2019 domestic violence charge filed against him in California, which was not prosecuted due to a COVID-19 pandemic-related backlog in the court system and the victim's non-appearance in court. His public defender raised mental health concerns at an arraignment hearing the week following his arrest, and in December, two court psychiatrists found Barrios unable to understand court proceedings or the charges against him. He was ordered to indefinite care at a state psychiatric facility until found competent to face charges. Two years later, he was evaluated as competent to stand trial on two charges of murder and six charges of attempted murder. In January 2025, Barrios pleaded guilty but mentally ill to murder. Because of his plea agreement, he will be sentenced to life without parole instead of death.
