= Nikolay Soltys =

Ukrainian mass murderer charged in the U.S.

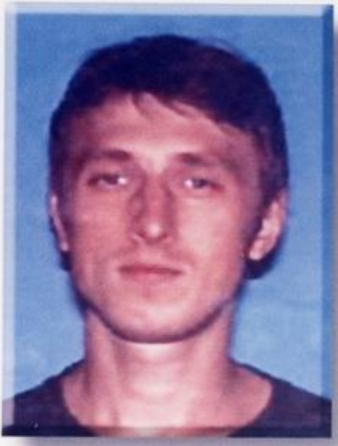
- Born: May 19, 1974; Shumsk, Ukrainian SSR, Soviet Union (now Ukraine)
- Died: February 13, 2002 (aged 27); Sacramento, California, U.S.
- Criminal charges: Unlawful Flight to Avoid Prosecution and murder

Details
- Victims: 6 (including his pregnant wife)
- Date: August 20, 2001
- Weapon: Knife

Nikolay Alekseyevich Soltys (May 19, 1974 – February 13, 2002) was a Ukrainian fugitive charged by the United States District Court for the Eastern District of California in a Federal Bureau of Investigation arrest warrant. The federal charges were for unlawful flight to avoid prosecution and there were California arrest warrants for six murders of his family members in and around the Sacramento area in August 2001.

== Background ==
Soltys was born in Shumsk, Western Ukraine on May 14, 1974. Residents of his former hometown described him as a shoemaker with violent and unpredictable behavior. At the time, Shumsk was a small religious town with a population of 5,000 residents. The town had four churches: two Orthodox churches from different branches, one Roman Catholic and one Pentecostal. Soltys and his parents belonged to the Pentecostal congregation. His parents joined a wave of Ukrainian religious population seeking refuge to the United States. Having successfully been granted refugee status in the U.S. by the former Immigration and Naturalization Service (INS), his parents migrated to New York. Soltys was known to have had violent episodes towards his parents.

ABC News reported that a newspaper from his homeland, the Kyiv daily Fakty (Facts), noted Soltys as being "abrupt" and sometimes violent prior to moving to the United States. He had arrived in the U.S. to be with his physically ailing father. The Fakty had apparently confirmed the 27-year-old refugee had a history of violence during an interview of Soltys' parents-in-law. They also denied that his rejection for enrollment into the Ukrainian military service was due to his mental instability. Instead, the relatives told the Fakty "What kept him out of the army was due to his flat feet."

Igor Nakonechnyi, the father of Soltys' wife Lyuba, told Fakty that, three years prior to the murders, Soltys had attacked Lyuba with an ax, which he had stored in a closet "for self-defense." Lyuba telephoned her parents seeking help, frantically asking them to come help her "so he doesn't kill me". He continued, "She always listened and was respectful, but then for the first time in her life she went against her parents, firmly saying, 'We love one another and I am going to live with him.'" Igor’s son, Petro, said that, even though he saw Soltys as a friend, he did not want the couple to get married because he saw Soltys as having "an unbalanced temper". He alleged that Soltys often threatened to commit suicide in arguments with his wife, attacked her multiple times, and even attempted push her in front of a moving car. He then claimed that during a specific encounter, he and his brother went to the married couple's residence and tried to take their sister back home. Soltys retaliated and tried to attack the brothers with an ax.

Shortly after the incident, Soltys left Ukraine, leaving his wife and newborn son and joining his parents in New York in 1998. After he arrived in New York, he ended up jobless after a car accident injury and was collecting welfare assistance.

== Migration ==
Shortly after his son was born, Nikolay left Ukraine and traveled to Binghamton, New York, where his parents had settled in the mid-1990s. Family members say Nikolay's parents had moved to the United States under the 1989 Lautenberg Amendment to the Foreign Operations Appropriations Act, a policy that allowed refugees from post-Soviet states to migrate to the U.S., which included Ukraine. Soltys was able to join his parents in 1998, using their status as persecuted Evangelical Christians, which gained his parents entry into the United States.

While in New York, Soltys had little money and lost his car after an accident. The crash also left him with back pain. Vasyura said Soltys often visited a chiropractor after the accident and wasn't working due to his injuries. After the loss of his father, Soltys and his mother decided to join relatives in California and moved to Sacramento.

== Murders ==
After 9 a.m. on Monday, August 20, 2001, the killings started at three locations; two in the suburbs of Sacramento, with the third alleged to have taken place in a field in Placer County, adjacent to, the north of, Sacramento County.

=== Pregnant wife ===
As Lyubov, Soltys' wife of over 3 years, was about to leave a duplex they had moved into two months earlier, when Soltys began stabbing her. Wounded, Lyubov tried to escape and went to their next-door neighbor's home for help. The neighbors immediately fled into their garage. The couple then listened from the garage as Soltys finished his wife's murder. According to the couple, Soltys then got into his car and sped away.

The Sacramento County Sheriff's Department said they received a 911 call around 10 a.m. from a Scallop Court resident in North Highlands. When deputies arrived, another neighbor, Vitaly Maznik, acted as an interpreter for detectives. Maznik said Soltys' wife was three months pregnant and scheduled to start her new job at 9:30 a.m. Responding officers found Lyubov's body in front of her neighbor's home. "He finished her there," Maznik said. "It's a terrible story."

Before 10 a.m., Soltys left the North Highlands murder scene. Witnesses told detectives he had fled in his 1995 silver Nissan Altima. He drove to the home of his aunt and uncle in Rancho Cordova.

=== Aunt, uncle and cousins ===
Soltys had lived with his aunt and uncle prior to his wife's arrival from Ukraine. When he first arrived Monday morning he showed no signs of trouble, authorities said.

Before 11 a.m., authorities received a second 9-1-1 call from a neighbor down the street, who saw a girl's body in the roadway and dialed 911 to report a hit-and-run. "I thought she was run over by a car, and then I heard a woman say, 'There's another one over here,'" Christopher Smith said.

The Sacramento Bee daily newspaper reported that, according to sources, Soltys, his aunt, and uncle - went up to the second-floor of the duplex. Evidence indicates that the three had chatted politely for a while about family matters. At the closing of the discussion is when, authorities said, Soltys produced a knife and killed them. The couple were found in an upstairs bathroom.

Detectives said Soltys then went downstairs for his young cousins, who also lived on Mills Station Road. He attacked 10-year-old Dmitriy, also using a knife. This is when 9-year-old Tatyana had tried to free her cousin from Soltys' attack.

Tatyana's aunt Inna Yasinsky said that Dmitriy's mother witnessed part of the attack after hearing screams from her duplex home next door. Yasinky said, "She saw her son stabbed and her beloved niece stabbed." She said that Tatyana was killed while trying to save her cousin, and that two other children managed to escape. Tatyana's twin sister, Galina, and her little sister, Viktoria, were also targets of the killings, investigators said, but escaped by running away from the scene. Later that same day, the fathers of the two murdered children came out of their homes and started washing their children's blood from the outer walls of the duplex and walkways.

Authorities noted that Soltys left the Mills Station murder scene and drove to his mother's house in Citrus Heights, a suburb of Sacramento, where she was babysitting his 3-year-old son Sergey Soltys. Soltys was to have enrolled in the American River College in Foothill Farms that same day. This directed detectives to determine the reason for why Soltys' mother was caring for the boy. His enrollment did not occur.

Firefighters arrived on scene first and found a severely stabbed young girl lying in the middle of the street in front of the elderly aunt and uncle's duplex. The girl was 9-year-old Tatyana Kukharskaya, their granddaughter. She was immediately taken to the University of California at Davis Medical Center, where she was pronounced dead upon arrival. A spokeswoman for the center announced that the girl had died en route to the center. A 10-year-old grandson of the elderly couple, Dmitry Kukharskiy, was found dead on the walkway adjacent to the front of the duplex. Witnesses said that the brutally stabbed children ran from their grandparents' home and the boy died in the arms of his mother, who ran out of the other half of the duplex when she heard the children screaming. The children were cousins and second cousins to Soltys. His aunt and uncle - 74-year-old Galina Kukharskaya, and 75-year-old Peter Kukharskiy (the variations in the spelling of their last names distinguish gender) - were found dead on the second floor of their duplex.

=== Son's death ===
When Soltys arrived at his mother's home on Monday afternoon, she told detectives on Tuesday that he seemed peaceful but hasty. He instantly walked to the kitchen sink and washed his hands, and the mother said he seemed messy but she saw no obvious bloodstains. After washing his hands, he quickly took his 3-year-old, blonde haired son, Sergey Soltys, and left.

With multiple witnesses connecting Soltys' Nissan Altima to the Midland Heights and Rancho Cordova murder scene getaways, police were able to find the abandoned Altima in the midnight hours of Monday. Detectives discovered a photo in the abandoned car a little after midnight on Tuesday. Authorities said the photo was found tucked away in the driver's side door storage compartment. Written on the back of the photo, of Sergey Soltys being held on his mother's lap, was a clue of where his son's body could be found. The note was written in Ukrainian, Soltys' mother translated the note for law enforcement, "He is in a box on a garbage pile at the end of Watt Avenue near the tower."

The boy's body was discovered in a blood-filled cardboard box, that was made for a 37-inch television set, by Sacramento County sheriff personnel. Prior to the discovery, sheriff officials had been searching along Watt Avenue, with helicopters and K-9 units, since the early morning hours of Tuesday. "I thought there was some hope that we'd still find the kid alive," said Sacramento County Sheriff Lou Blanas after the discovery of the toddler's body was released. "It is just very sad that this is the way it turned out."

Soltys' abandoned Nissan Altima was found Monday night near the intersection of Auburn Boulevard and Madison Avenue. When detectives found the photo, they were not sure the message was authentic or simply a lie to lead the official's investigation in a flawed direction.

In the hours prior to the toddler's discovery, four Russian-speaking Sacramentans, made up of two sheriff deputies and two civilians, were the first persons to attempt to translate the photo's note. They told investigators that "The boy could be found in a box at the end of Watt avenue." Based on this translation an extensive search was conducted over hours where Watt Avenue dead ends at Baseline Road, just across the Sacramento County line in Placer County.

Officials came up empty handed in their search and the Sheriff's Department then brought Soltys' mother in for questioning and to look at the note. She found the word "tower" in the writing, officials said the initial Russian translators missed the word due to differences in their dialects.

With this new information of the tower, Blanas ordered the entire department's day shift to remain on duty and to ready for the expanded search of Watt Avenue. At approximately 4 p.m., investigators discovered the cardboard box. It was found in Placer County approximately half-a-mile from the corner of Baseline Road and Crowder Lane, within a couple of miles from where Watt Avenue ended. The box was placed below a telecommunication switching tower atop a pile of garbage in a grove of oak trees. Authorities announced that the boy's killing appeared to be from knife stabbings and the cutting off of the child's tongue, leading him to bleed profusely from his mouth. They speculated that his life was taken on Monday afternoon, within hours of the previous family murders.

Later an auto mechanic contacted the authorities and told them he had worked on the vehicle that Soltys was driving Monday evening. He described the vehicle as a mid-1990s emerald green Ford Explorer with the color silver at the bumper line and below. The mechanic said Soltys' son, Sergey, was with the suspect at the time. He said he had worked on the car around 8 p.m. and had removed cargo rails from the top of the vehicle.

== Aftermath ==
On August 23, he became the 466th fugitive to be placed on the FBI's Ten Most Wanted list. On August 30, Soltys was arrested in the backyard of a family member's home without incident in Citrus Heights, California and was booked into the Sacramento County Jail. He subsequently committed suicide by hanging himself in his cell on February 13, 2002.

== Copycats ==
Soltys’ stabbing spree had inspired two copycats.

=== Joseph Ferguson ===
In September a few weeks after Soltys’ stabbing spree, Joseph Ferguson went on a shooting spree, killing five people and injuring two, before committing suicide. A motive found for Ferguson’s spree, was to outdo Soltys’ rampage.

=== Grigoriy Bukhantsov ===
On October 23, 2012, Ukrainian immigrant, Grigoriy Bukhantsov, stabbed his sister-in-law and her two children to death in their Rancho Cordova home. He was arrested and a statement he said was: “Nikolay Soltys has nothing on me.” In 2018, Bukhantsov pled guilty to the murders.

== See also ==
- Adam Moss - Another fugitive who committed a mass murder around the same time as Soltys.
