= Murder in Iowa law =

Aspect of Iowa law

Murder in Iowa law constitutes the intentional killing, under circumstances defined by law, of people within or under the jurisdiction of the U.S. state of Iowa.

The United States Centers for Disease Control and Prevention reported that in the year 2020, the state had one of the lowest murder rates in the country.

== Definitions ==
=== First-degree murder ===
The most serious homicide offense in Iowa is first-degree murder. It is defined as one of the following:

- Intentionally killing another person with premeditation
- Killing of another person while participating in a "forcible felony"
- Killing another person during a prison escape or attempted prison escape
- Intentionally killing peace officer, correctional officer, public employee, or hostage while imprisoned, regardless of premeditation
- Killing a child during the crime of child endangerment regardless of intent, while demonstrating a depraved indifference to human life
- Killing another person during an act of terrorism

For adult offenders, first-degree murder is punishable only by life in prison without the possibility of parole. For juvenile offenders, it is punishable only by life-with-parole after 25 years.

=== Second-degree murder ===
Second-degree murder in Iowa is defined as a murder which does not satisfy the first-degree murder standard of premeditated intent. It is punishable by up to 50 years in prison, with the possibility of parole after 70 percent of the sentence or less. It is punishable by life-without-parole for adults offenders who have been previously convicted of murder.

== Penalties ==
Offense	Mandatory sentencing
Involuntary manslaughter	Up to 5 years in prison
Voluntary manslaughter	Up to 10 years in prison
Solicitation to commit murder	Up to 10 years in prison
Homicide by vehicle	Up to 25 years in prison
Second-degree murder	Up to 50 years in prison, with the possibility of parole after 70 percent of the sentence or less, or; Life-without-parole if the defendant is an adult who was previously convicted of murder
First-degree murder	For adults: Life imprisonment without the possibility of parole, with first 5 years in solitary confinement For juveniles: Life-with-parole after no less than 25 years
