= Murder in Illinois law =

Aspect of Illinois criminal law

Murder in Illinois law constitutes the intentional killing, under circumstances defined by law, of people within or under the jurisdiction of the U.S. state of Illinois.

The United States Centers for Disease Control and Prevention reported that in the year 2021, the state had a murder rate somewhat above the median for the entire country.

== Definitions ==
=== First-degree murder ===
Illinois has four different homicide crimes in total, with first degree murder being the most serious offense. Illinois law defines first degree murder as when a person intends to kill, intends to inflict great bodily harm, or knowingly engages in an act that has a strong probability of death or great bodily harm for another individual, causing a person's death. It is punished by a minimum of 20 years in prison and a maximum of life imprisonment without the possibility of parole. The only exception is for offenders under the age of 21, where the maximum sentence is life-with-parole after 40 years. Illinois does not have the death penalty.

==== Felony murder rule ====
Illinois also employs the felony murder rule. When someone commits a "forcible felony" besides second-degree murder causing someone's death, it is first degree murder.

=== Second degree murder ===
In Illinois, second degree murder is not in itself an individual offense, but is a downgraded version of first-degree murder. A defendant is guilty of second degree murder when they commit first degree murder with one of the following mitigating circumstances:

- The defendant was seriously provoked to the point that they committed the murder in an intense passion, but the action was not reasonable force.
- At the time of the murder, the defendant believed deadly force would have been lawfully justified, but the belief was unreasonable.

Second degree murder is punished by either 4 to 20 years in prison, with the possibility of 4 of the years being reduced to probation.

== Penalties ==
The sentences for homicide offenses in Illinois are listed below.

Offense	Mandatory sentence
Involuntary manslaughter	Up to 4 years probation, or 2 to 7 years in prison
Voluntary manslaughter (fetal killing)	Up to 4 years probation, or 4 to 15 years in prison
Second degree murder	4 to 20 years in prison, with the possibility of having 4 years reduced to probation
First degree murder	For offenders over 21: 20 years to life imprisonment without the possibility of parole For offenders under 21: 20 years to life-with-parole after 40 years
