= 2020 Knox County stabbing =

Stabbing attack in Tennessee, U.S.

- Knoxville (Tennessee) Knoxville (the United States)
- Location: 35°59′57″N 83°46′40.5″W; 7210 Strawberry Plains Pike; Knoxville, Tennessee, United States
- Date: 7 April 2020 c. 7 a.m. (UTC-4:00)
- Target: Truck stop patrons
- Attack type: Mass stabbing, mass murder
- Weapon: Knife
- Deaths: 4 (including the perpetrator)
- Injuries: 1
- Perpetrator: Idris Abdus-Salaam

The 2020 Knox County stabbing occurred on April 7, 2020, shortly before 7 a.m. Eastern Daylight Time, when Idris Abdus-Salaam stabbed three women to death and injured a fourth at a Pilot truck stop a few miles east of Knoxville, Tennessee, located at 7210 Strawberry Plains Pike. Abdus-Salaam was then shot and killed by a responding police officer on the scene.

== Attack ==
A man armed with a knife inside a Pilot truck rest stop followed store manager Joyce Whaley, 57, into the woman's bathroom, launching the start of a stabbing rampage. He stabbed Whaley 11 times, killing her, and then left the washroom to attack other patrons at the station. He stabbed to death Patricia Denise Nibbe, who was nearby the washroom door, and then began to stab Nettie R. Spencer, 41.

Others at the scene began to react to the attack, and attempted to intervene against the assailant, with one person reportedly spraying the attacker with a fire extinguisher as Spencer managed to leave through the front door of the station. The assailant chased Spencer outside and began attacking her again, killing her. He then launched himself at the nearby car of customer Dessa Hutchison, who had left the station earlier in response to the attack, and fled to the driver's seat of her vehicle to call 911. The attacker pulled Hutchison from her car, repeatedly stabbing her while she was still on the line with police operators. The attacker then left her car, and began wandering around the station's parking lot.

During this time, a Pilot employee bystander got behind the wheel of a nearby SUV he found open, and ran the car into the assailant twice, sending him over the hood of the car on the second attempt. After both collisions, the attacker got back up, and began to wander around the parking lot again.

The first police officer to arrive on the scene was Officer Jordan Hurst, who confronted the assailant on the street outside the stop while the assailant was still armed with the knife. Hurst shouted at the suspect from his vehicle to stop and drop the knife eight times before firing five close range rounds at the attacker as he refused to drop his knife and started moving towards the car. Hurst was placed on paid administrative leave during investigation of the incident, per department policy, and later returned to duty.

== Assailant ==
The assailant was truck driver Idris Abdus-Salaam, aged 33, from Durham, North Carolina. Abdus-Salaam's driving log from his truck confirmed that he was driving between Kentucky and Illinois at the time of the attack. Abdus-Salaam had been already in and out of the store multiple times throughout that morning. Security cameras spotted him parking his truck, taking a shower, returning to his vehicle multiple times, loitering in throughout the station, and observing the stop on multiple occasions from a corner where he could get a full view of both main sections of building, while he was watching the staff serving the incoming early-morning influx of customers. These cameras also later captured much of the events of the attack itself.

Although Abdus-Salaam was a Muslim, nothing was found to indicate that any religious motivation played a part in the attack. Police found during their investigation that during the lead up to the attack, Abdus-Salaam had left rambling journal writings and an internet history that suggested he was "paranoid", and "angry" - being described as "angry towards all people in general". They showed a recent preoccupation with the concept of religion, looking up the beliefs and prayer behaviors of multiple religions. They also showed a resentment toward law enforcement, as well as mentioning “demons”, and expressing how he felt “abandoned and mistreated” by society. Overall, investigators found the records fairly "random", with nothing to indicate any sort of radicalization. There was additionally no indication he had conspired with anyone else at any point before the attack.

In the short term, his employment was believed to be a main trigger for the attack. By the time of the stabbing, Abdus-Salaam had been employed as a truck driver by Swift Transportation Inc. for about nine months. He had only started this job after he was forced to resign in May 2019 from his previous job, as a prison guard with the North Carolina Department of Safety. His resignation was mandated following a confrontation with a co-worker, for which Abdus-Salaam received a written reprimand. He made multiple attempts to get his job back, but all these were refused. He had recently been notified ten days before the attack that he had no chance of being rehired. It is believed that was a "tipping point" for the attack.

In the days after the attack, Abdus-Salaam's mother stated the attack was completely out of character for her son, and that he hadn't been a violent person. However, his girlfriend and his sister did tell investigators they both had noticed Abdus-Salaam displaying paranoid behavior recently, both independently claiming they had spoken to him and urged him to seek help for his mental health. Despite this, there was no record that he ever was diagnosed with, or sought any treatment for, any mental condition. For a short time, it was suspected Abdus-Salaam may have been connected with an earlier (and still unresolved) knife attack on a nurse in Millington, Tennessee, in October 2019. He was later confirmed to have been uninvolved, being far away from the town at that time.
