= Incarceration in California =

Overview of incarceration in the U.S. state of California

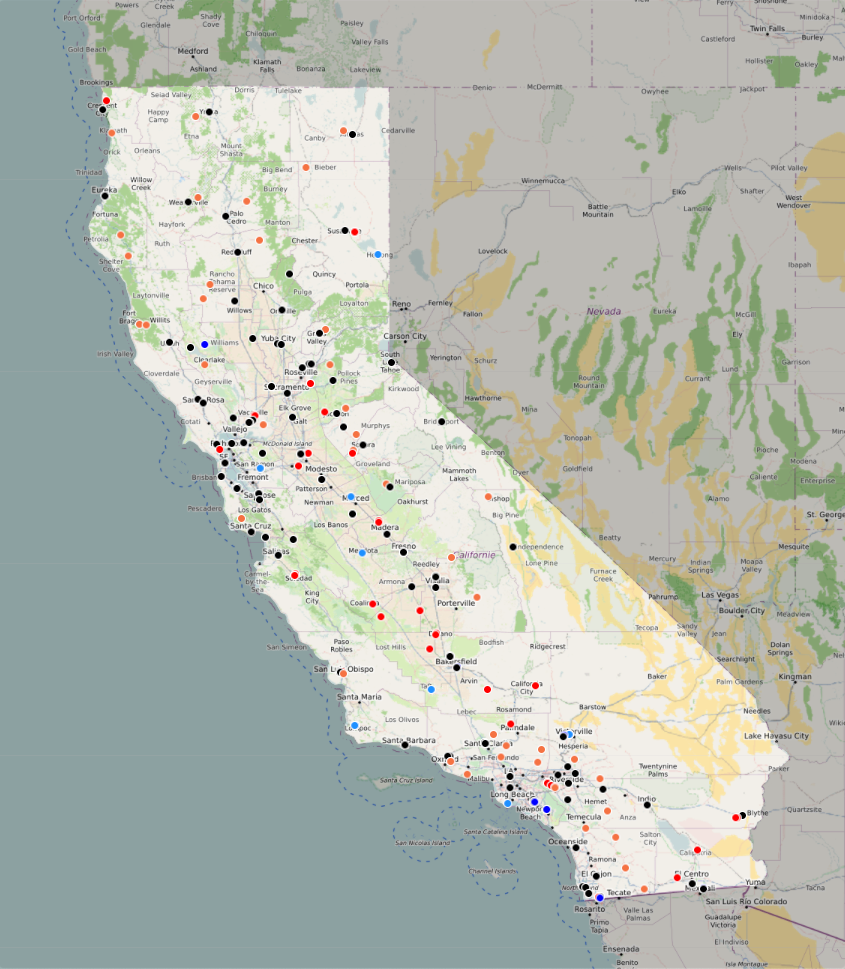
All federal, state, and county incarceration facilities in California

Incarceration in California spans federal, state, county, and city governance, with approximately 200,000 people in confinement at any given time. An additional 55,000 people are on parole.

The main government agencies and incarceration facilities involved in each jurisdiction are:

- Federal: federal prisons run by the Federal Bureau of Prisons (BOP), and immigrant detention centers run by Immigration and Customs Enforcement (ICE)
- State: state prisons, fire camps, and juvenile justice facilities, as well as a variety of community housing programs, all run by the California Department of Corrections and Rehabilitation (CDCR)
- County: county jails, usually run by county sheriffs and sometimes run by a county-level department of corrections
- City: city jails run by the city police department

Most people incarcerated in county and city jails are in pre-trial detention and have therefore not been convicted of a crime.

== Federal incarceration ==
Federal incarceration facilities
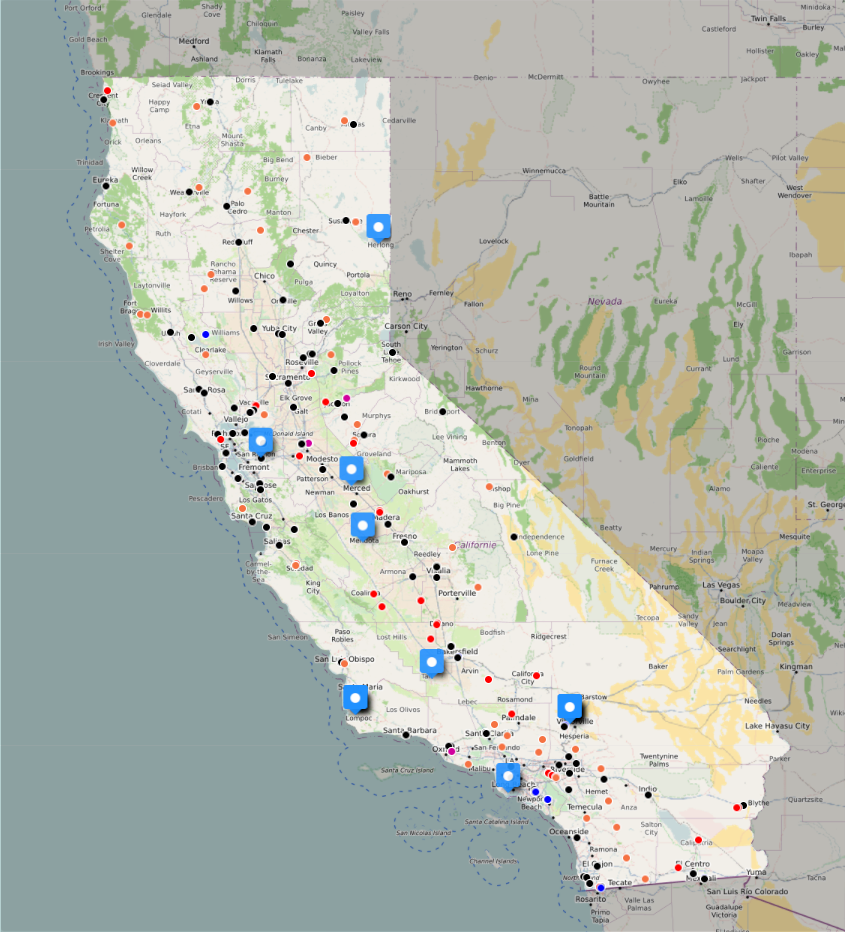
Federal prisons in California

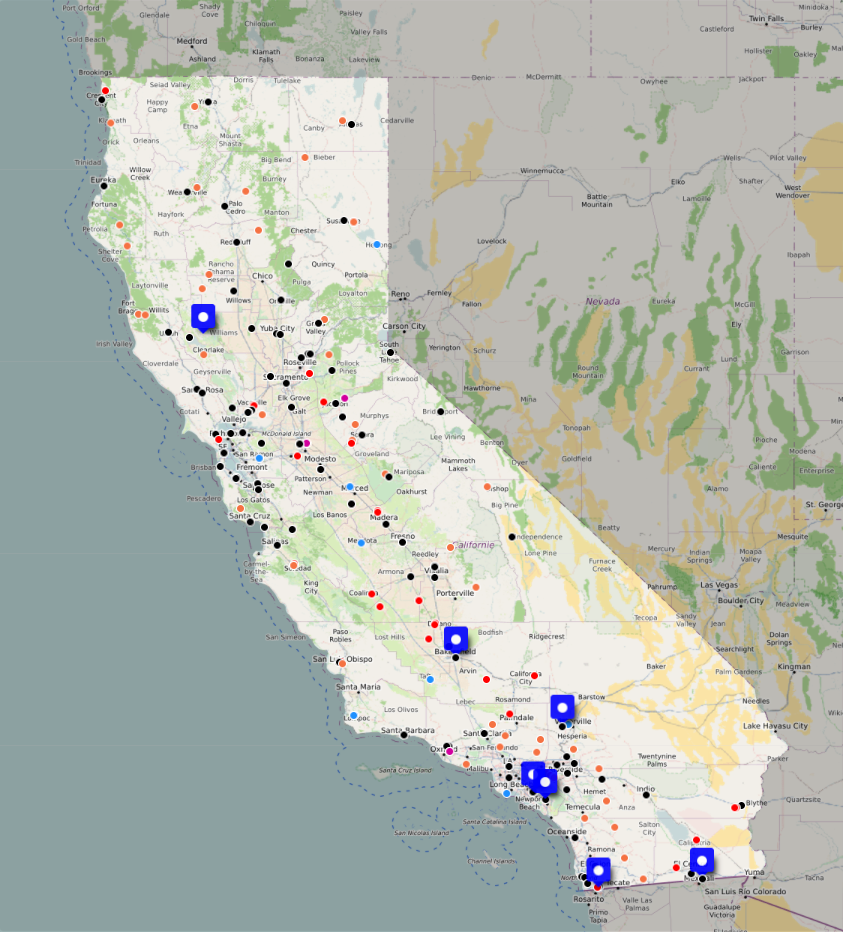
ICE detention centers in California

=== Federal prisons ===
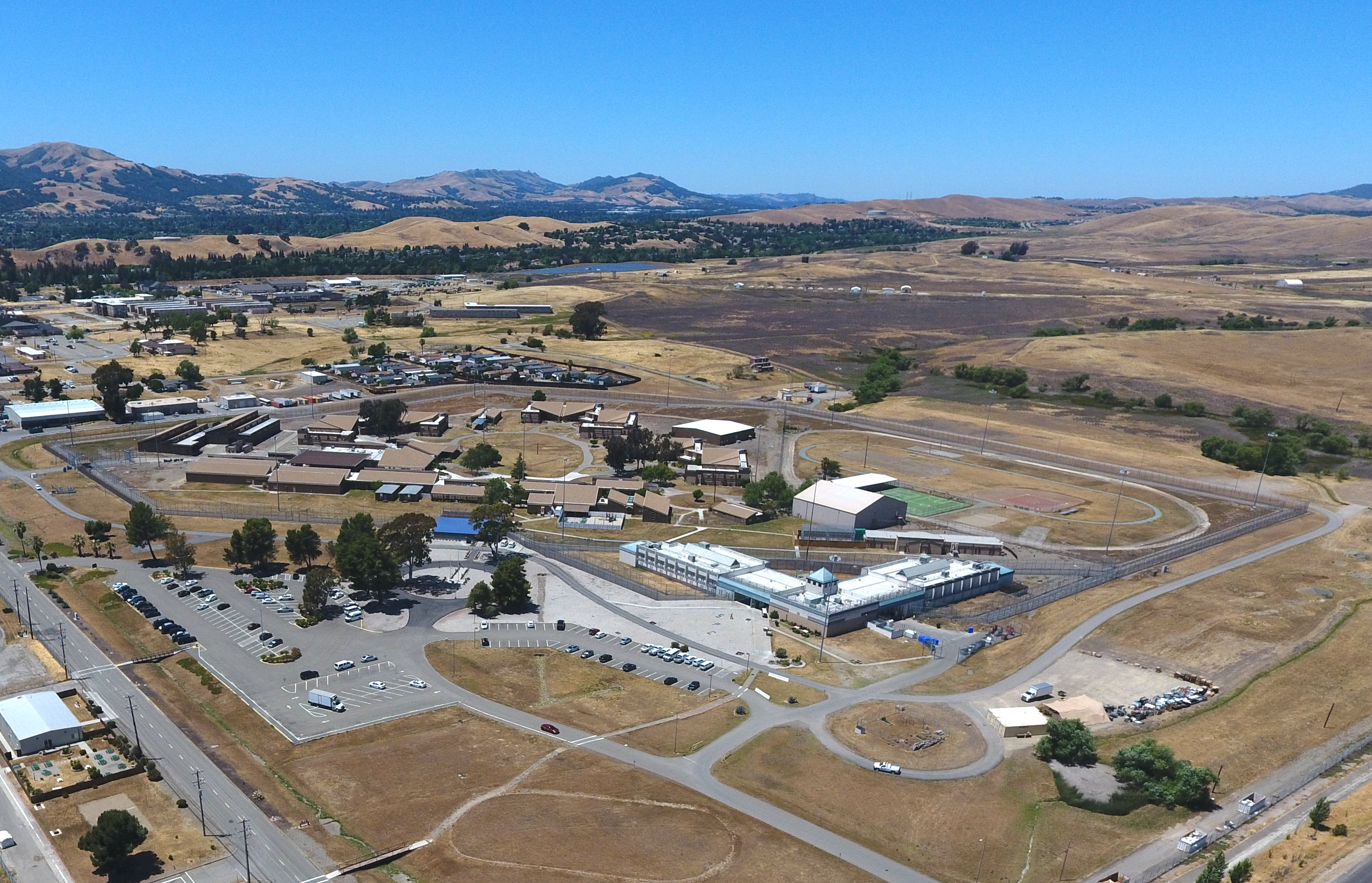
FCI Dublin, one of five federal prisons for women in the United States

The Federal Bureau of Prisons (BOP) operates a variety of facilities in California, including United States Penitentiaries (USPs), Federal Correctional Institutions (FCIs), and Private Correctional Institutions (PCIs). One BOP facility, Taft Correctional Institution, is operated by Management and Training Corporation (MCT), a private company.

As of April 2020, 13,315 people were under custody in BOP facilities in California. An additional 422 people were under BOP custody in privately run facilities in California, and an unspecified number of people were under BOP custody in community-based facilities in California. Roughly 8% of the people in BOP custody are in California.

=== ICE detention centers ===
Immigration and Customs Enforcement (ICE) contracts with various private companies to detain people in California. The largest ICE detention facilities in California are:

- Adelanto Detention Center (owned and operated by GEO Group)
- Otay Mesa Detention Center (owned and operated by CoreCivic)
- Imperial Regional Detention Facility (owned and operated by Management and Training Corporation)
- Mesa Verde Ice Processing Center (owned and operated by GEO Group)

Per a Congressional mandate that first appeared in the Department of Homeland Security Appropriations Act of 2010, ICE must maintain at least 34,000 detention beds in total across the country. ICE detention facilities in California contribute 3,515 mandatory beds to that mandate. As of August 22, 2020, ICE facilities in California had an average daily population of 3,118.

== State incarceration ==
State incarceration facilities
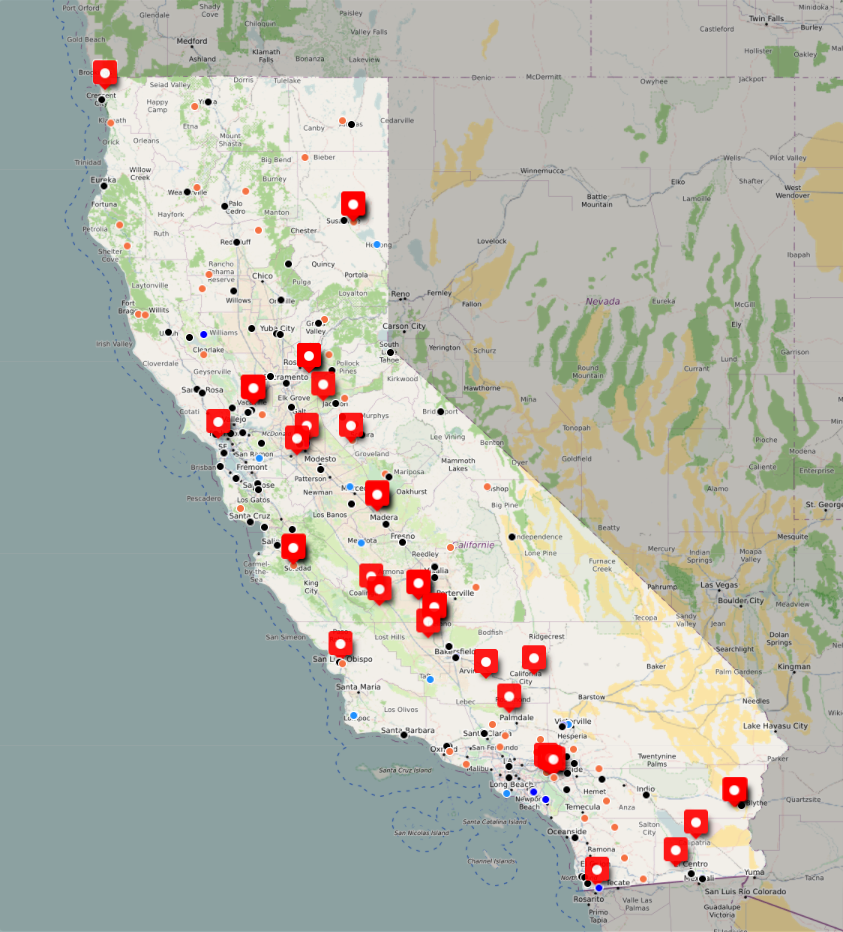
State prisons in California

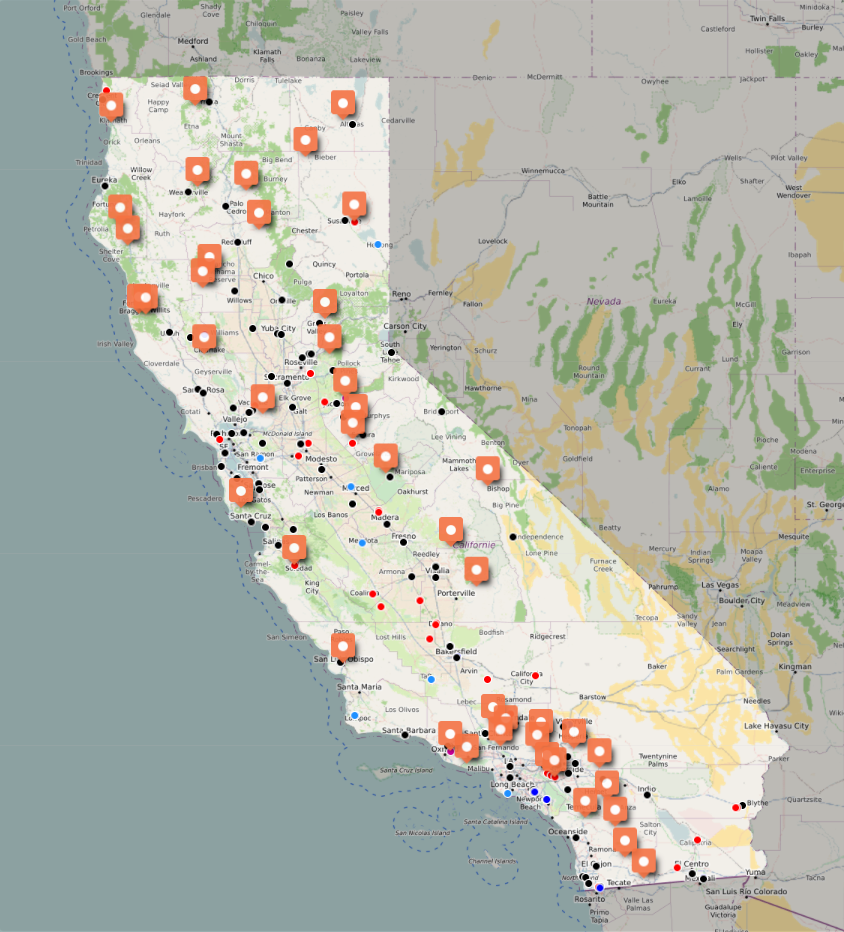
Fire camps in California

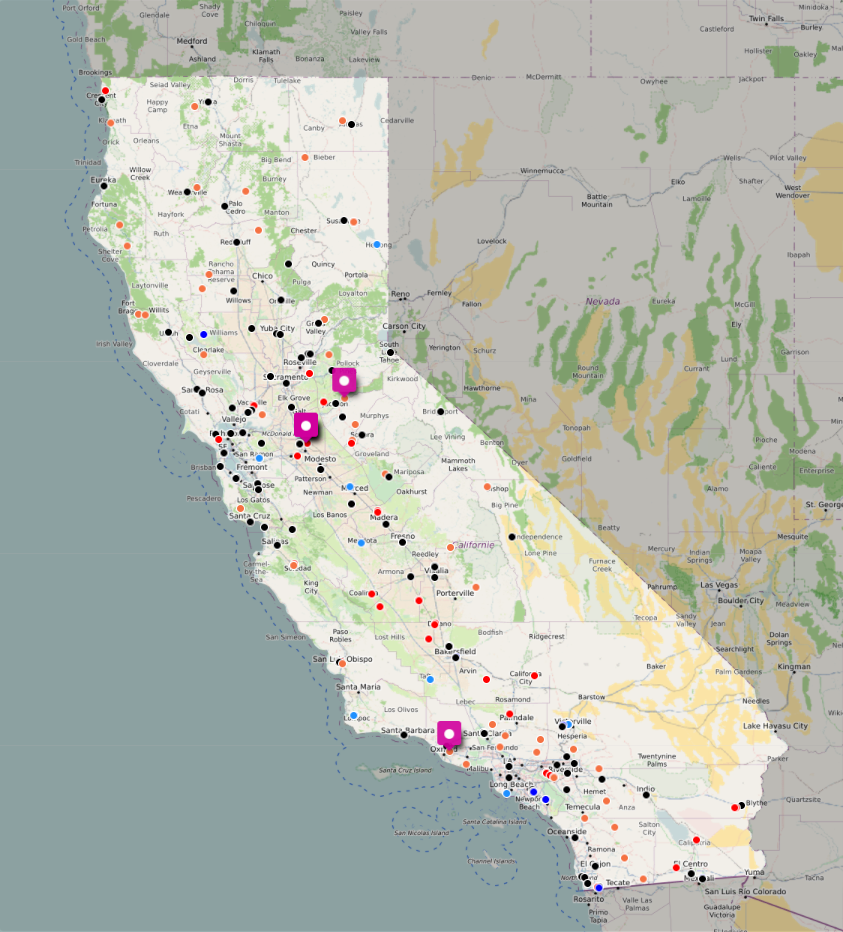
Juvenile detention facilities in California

=== State prisons ===
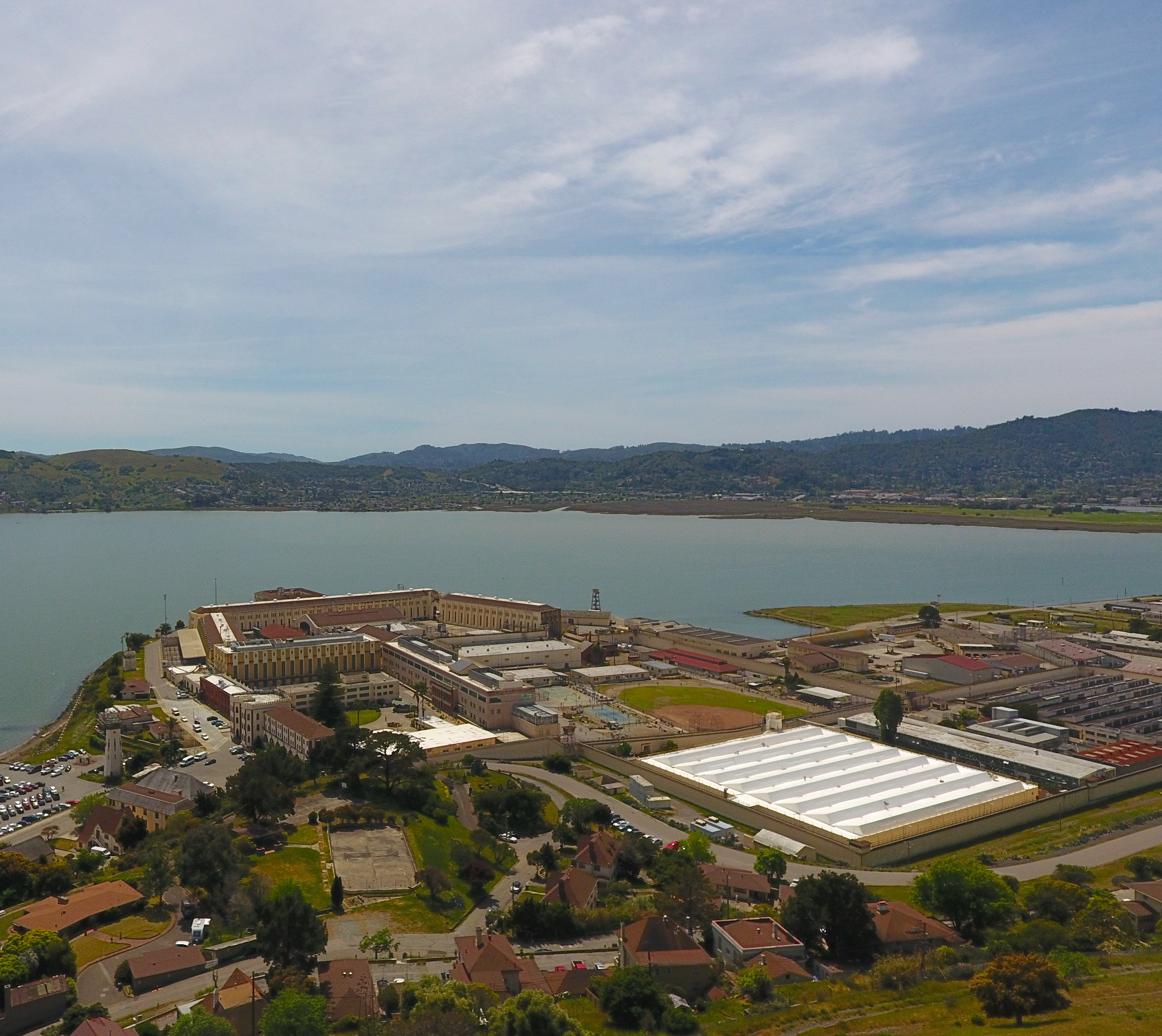
Aerial view of San Quentin, including the housing units, yard, education center, and Prison Industry Authority facilities

The California Department of Corrections and Rehabilitation (CDCR) owns and operates 31 adult prisons in California, with a design capacity of 85,083 incarcerated people.

The state's prison medical care system has been in receivership since 2006, when a federal court ruled in Plata v. Brown that the state failed to provide a constitutional level of medical care to its prisoners. Since 2009, the state has been under court order to reduce prison overcrowding to no higher than 137.5% of total design capacity.

=== Fire camps ===
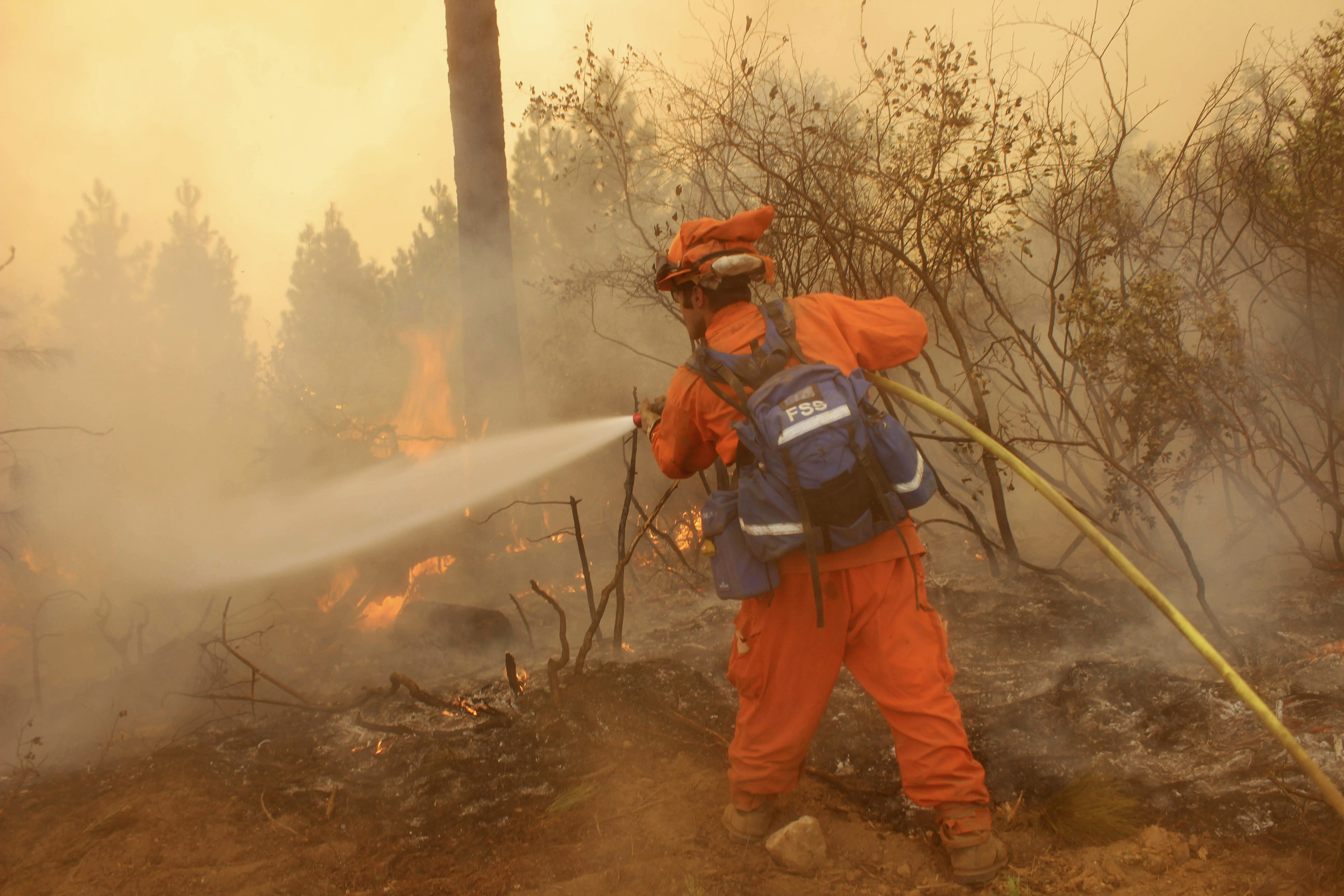
Incarcerated firefighters fight the Rim Fire in California in 2013.

The California Department of Corrections and Rehabilitation (CDCR) runs 44 conservation camps (also known as fire camps) jointly with the California Department of Forestry and Fire Protection (CAL FIRE) and the Los Angeles County Fire Department. The conservation camp program mission is to "support state, local and federal government agencies as they respond to emergencies such as fires, floods, and other natural or manmade disasters." Over 3,000 incarcerated people work at the conservation camps each year, including men, women, and juveniles. They receive the same entry-level training as CAL FIRE's seasonal firefighters.

CAL FIRE reported 3,500 incarcerated firefighters in its 2018-2019 staffing numbers, making incarcerated firefighters approximately 27% of the total firefighting capacity of the state.

=== Juvenile detention facilities ===
California Department of Corrections and Rehabilitation's Division of Juvenile Justice (DJJ) (formerly known as the California Youth Authority (CYA)) manages youth incarceration. DJJ incarcerates youths from ages 12 – 25; youths tried as adult and committed to the Division of Adult Institutions may be transferred to an adult prison once they turn 18.

DJJ owns and operates 3 prisons and 1 youth fire camp, with a total design capacity of roughly 750 incarcerated people. Those facilities are:

- Ventura Youth Correctional Facility
- N. A. Chaderjian Youth Correctional Facility
- O.H. Close Youth Correctional Facility
- Pine Grove Youth Conservation Camp

=== Other facilities ===
In addition to running prisons and camps, CDCR runs or contracts with private companies to run a variety of smaller-scale community incarceration facilities:

- Community Correctional Facilities (CCF): facilities owned and operated by cities or private companies, originally leveraged by CDCR to house people during the peak of prison overcrowding in the state. The facilities have an aggregate capacity of 2818 beds:
  - Delano Modified Community Correctional Facility (DMCCF): owned and operated by the city of Delano in Kern County
  - Golden State Modified Community Correctional Facility (GSMCCF): owned and operated by Geo Group in Kern County
  - McFarland Female Community Reentry Facility (FCRF): owned and operated by Geo Group in Kern County
  - Shafter Modified Community Correctional Facility (SMCCF): owned and operated by the city of Shafter in Kern County
  - Taft Modified Community Correctional Facility (TMCCF): owned and operated by the city of Taft in Kern County
- Community Prisoner Mother Program (CPMP): women with children under the age of 6 may be eligible for this 24-bed "community substance abuse treatment program where non-serious, nonviolent female offenders may serve a sentence up to six years."
- Alternative Custody Program (ACP): some people service prison sentences may "serve up to the last 12 months of their sentence in the community in lieu of confinement in state prison. Eligible participants may be housed in a private residence, a transitional care facility or a residential drug or other treatment program."
- Custody to Community Treatment Reentry Program (CCTRP): some women may "serve their sentence in the community at a CCTRP as designated by the Department, in lieu of confinement in State prison and at the discretion of the Secretary. The CCTRP will provide a range of rehabilitative services that assist with alcohol and drug recovery, employment, education, housing, family reunification, and social support." This program has facilities in San Diego, Santa Fe Springs, Bakersfield, Stockton, and Sacramento, with an aggregate capacity of 399 beds.
- Male Community Reentry Program (MCRP): some men serving prison sentences may "serve the end of their sentence (up to one year) in the community in lieu of confinement at a CDCR institution. The MCRP is designed to provide a range of community-based, rehabilitative services that assist with substance use disorder treatment, mental health care, medical care, employment, education, housing, family reunification, and social support." MCRP has facilities in Butte County, Kern County, Los Angeles County, and San Diego County.

== County incarceration ==
County incarceration facilities
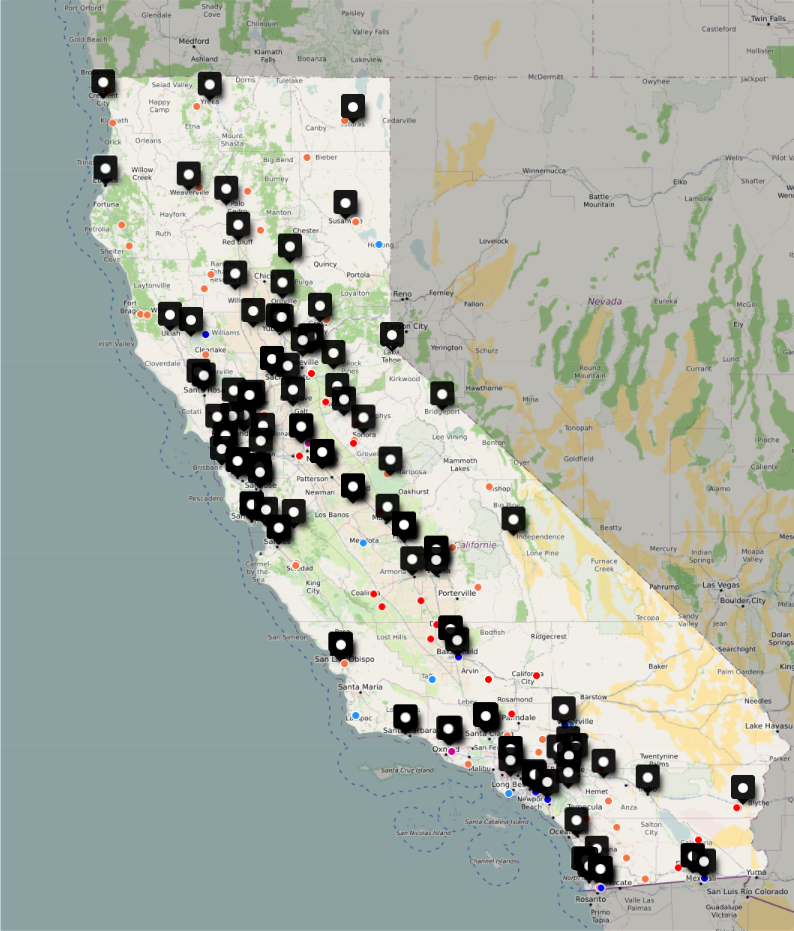
County jails in California

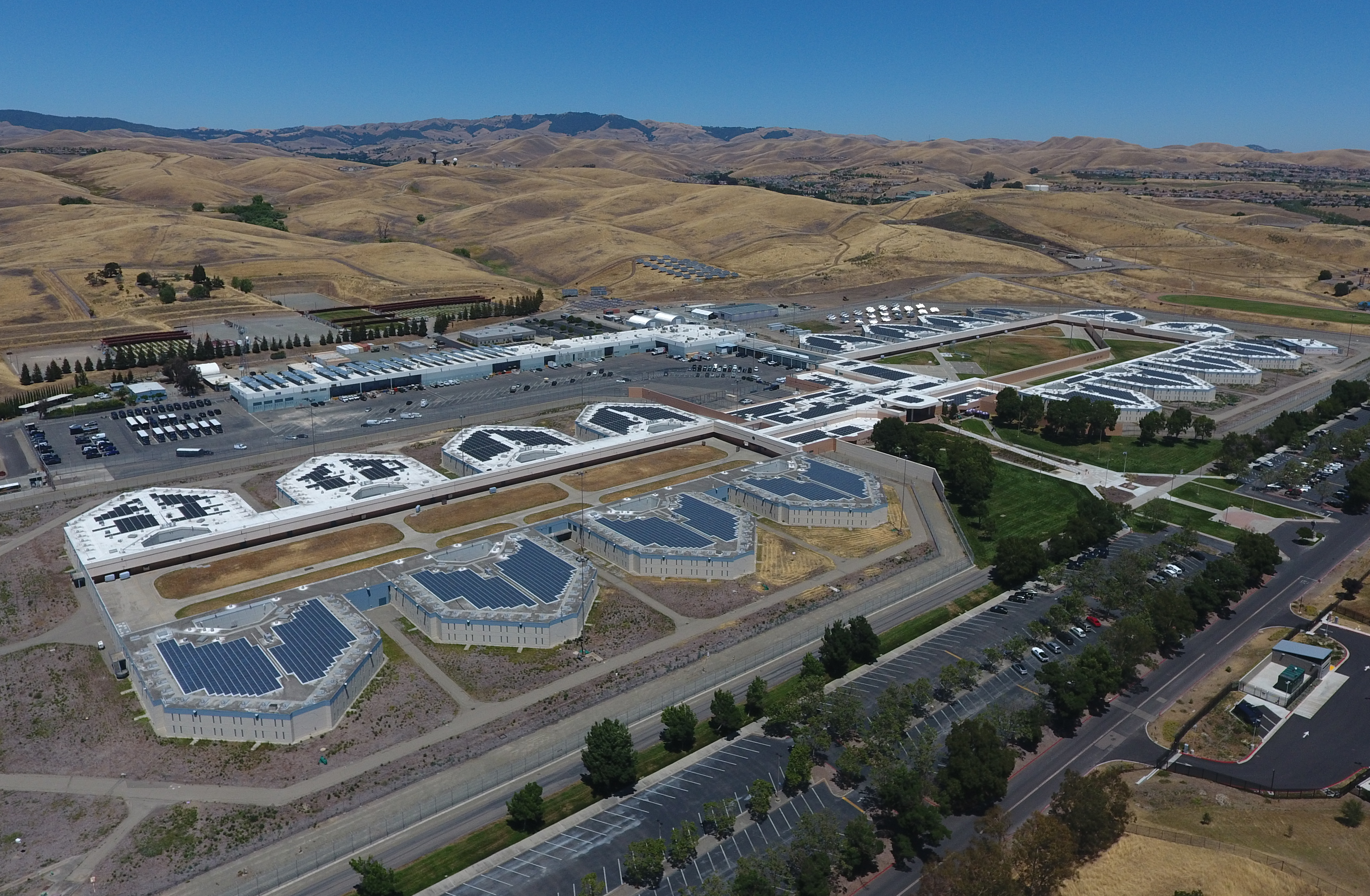
Aerial view of Santa Rita Jail in Alameda County

The California Board of State and Community Corrections tracks 116 county jails across California's 58 counties, with a total design capacity of 78,243 incarcerated people.

California's county jails function like county jails throughout the United States: they are used to incarcerated people pre-trial, through a trial and sentencing, and for some sentences of commitment. The majority of people incarcerated in California's county jails have not been sentenced (they are pre-trial and have not been convicted of a crime). Most county jails are run by the county sheriff; occasionally they are run by a county-level department of corrections.

Historically, time would be served in a county jail for sentences of less than a year, including sentences for misdemeanors and some felonies. In 2011, California's Public Safety Realignment Act was signed into law in response to the Supreme Court case Brown v. Plata and the resulting court order to address prison overcrowding in the state. Realignment "shifted responsibility for all sentenced non-violent, non-serious, non-sex offenders from state to local jurisdictions", which decreased California prison populations, increased California county jail populations, and changed the types and distribution of crimes for which people were serving sentences in county jails.

== City incarceration ==
Some cities run their own jails for incarcerating people in pre-trial detention, typically overseen by the city police department. Many city jails additionally have a "pay to stay" program as an alternative to incarceration in a county jail.

== See also ==
- Prisons in California
- California fire camps
- Capital punishment in California
- Pay jail
