= List of California county jails =

California's county jails function like county jails throughout the United States: they are used to incarcerate people pre-trial, through a trial and sentencing, and for some sentences of commitment. The majority of people incarcerated in California's county jails have not been sentenced (they are pre-trial and have not been convicted of a crime).

Historically, time would be served in a county jail for sentences of less than a year, including sentences for misdemeanors and some felonies. In 2011, the Public Safety Realignment Act was signed into law in response to the Supreme Court case Brown v. Plata and the resulting court order to address prison overcrowding in the state. Realignment "shifted responsibility for all sentenced non-violent, non-serious, non-sex offenders from state to local jurisdictions", which decreased California prison populations, increased California county jail populations, and changed the types and distribution of crimes for which people were serving sentences in county jails.

For comparison, in December 2019 there were approximately 71,200 people incarcerated in California county jails (based on average daily population), 124,027 people incarcerated in California state prisons, and 51,923 people on parole in California.

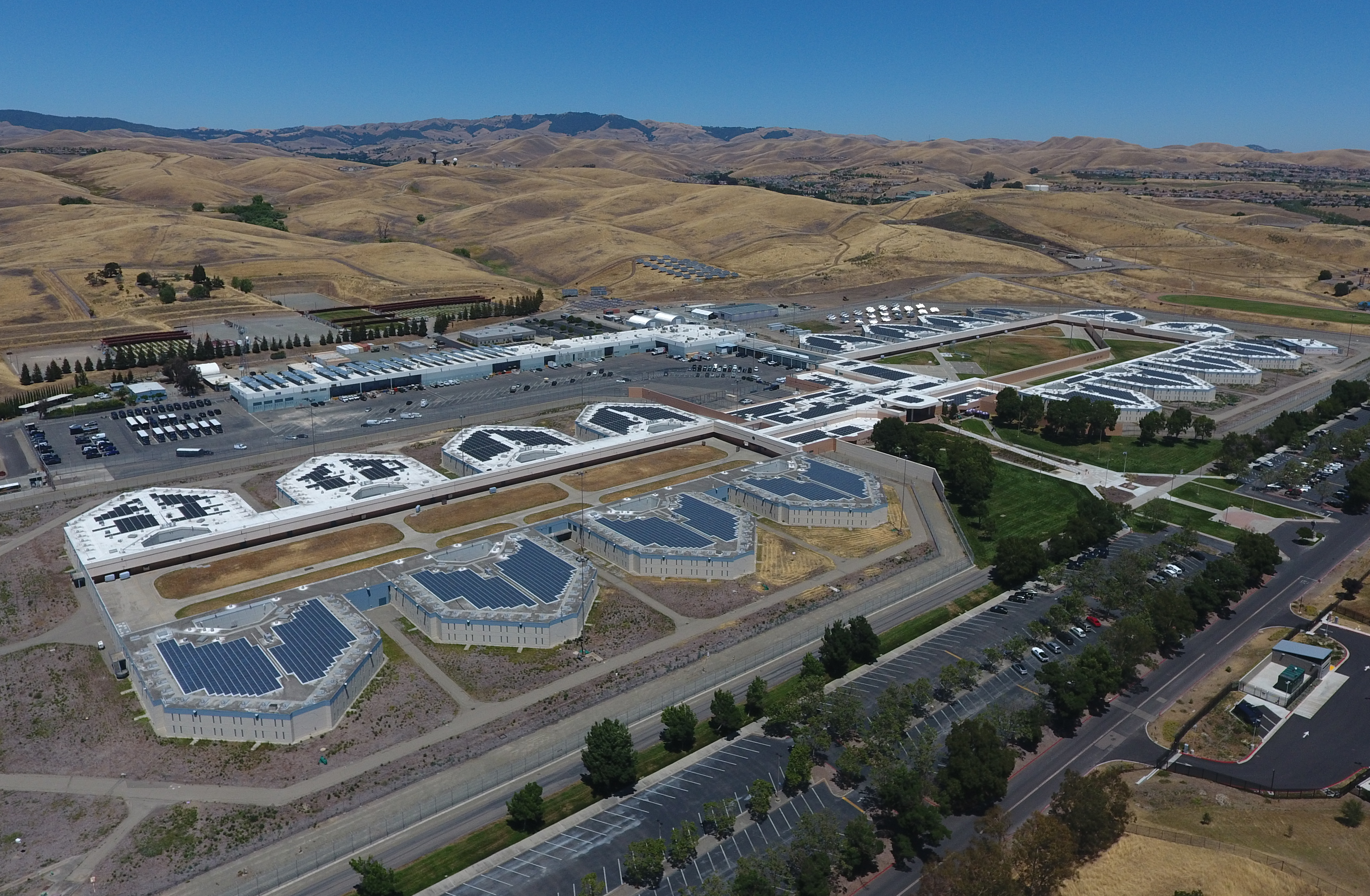
Santa Rita Jail

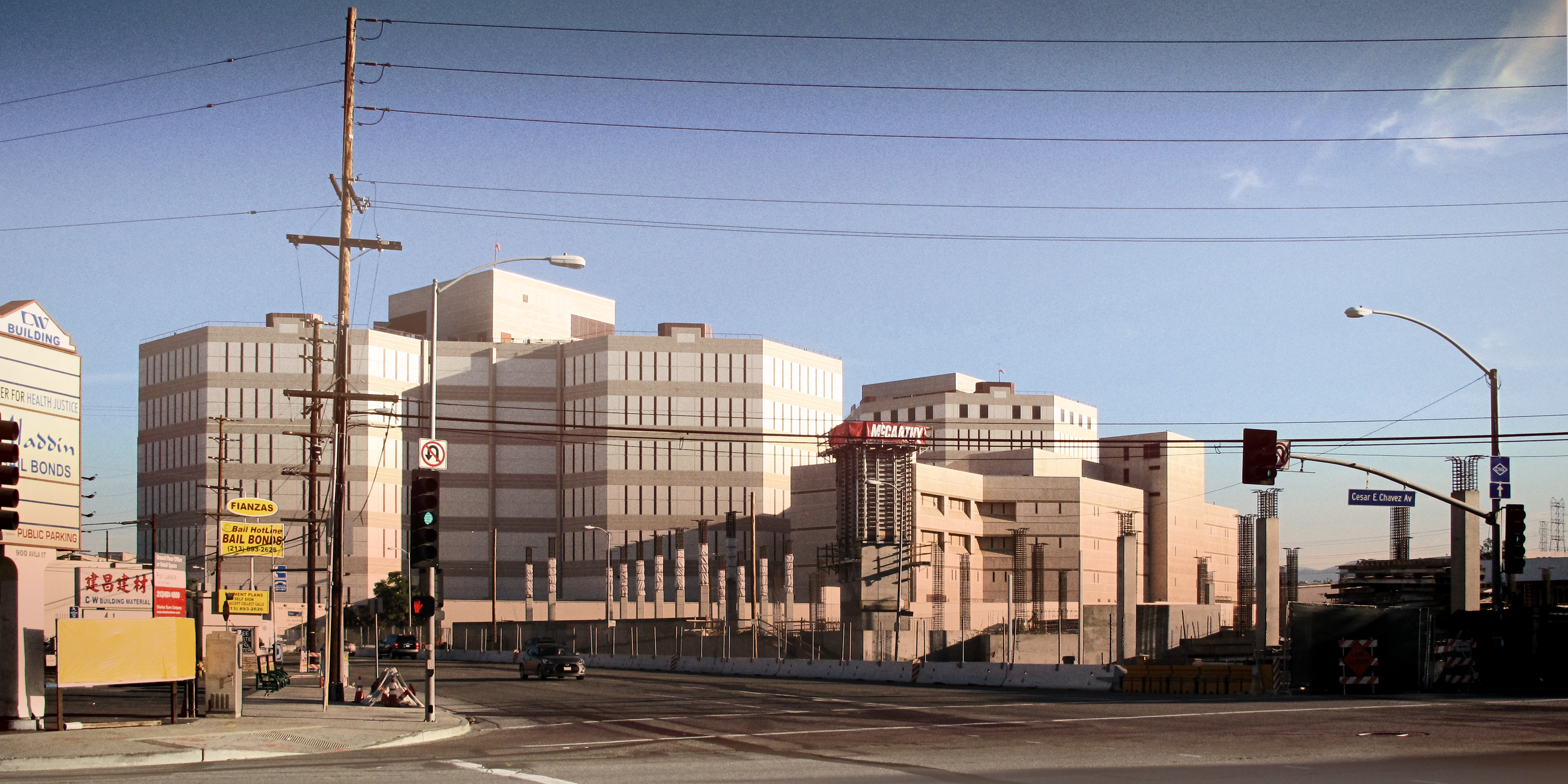
Los Angeles Men's Central Jail 2

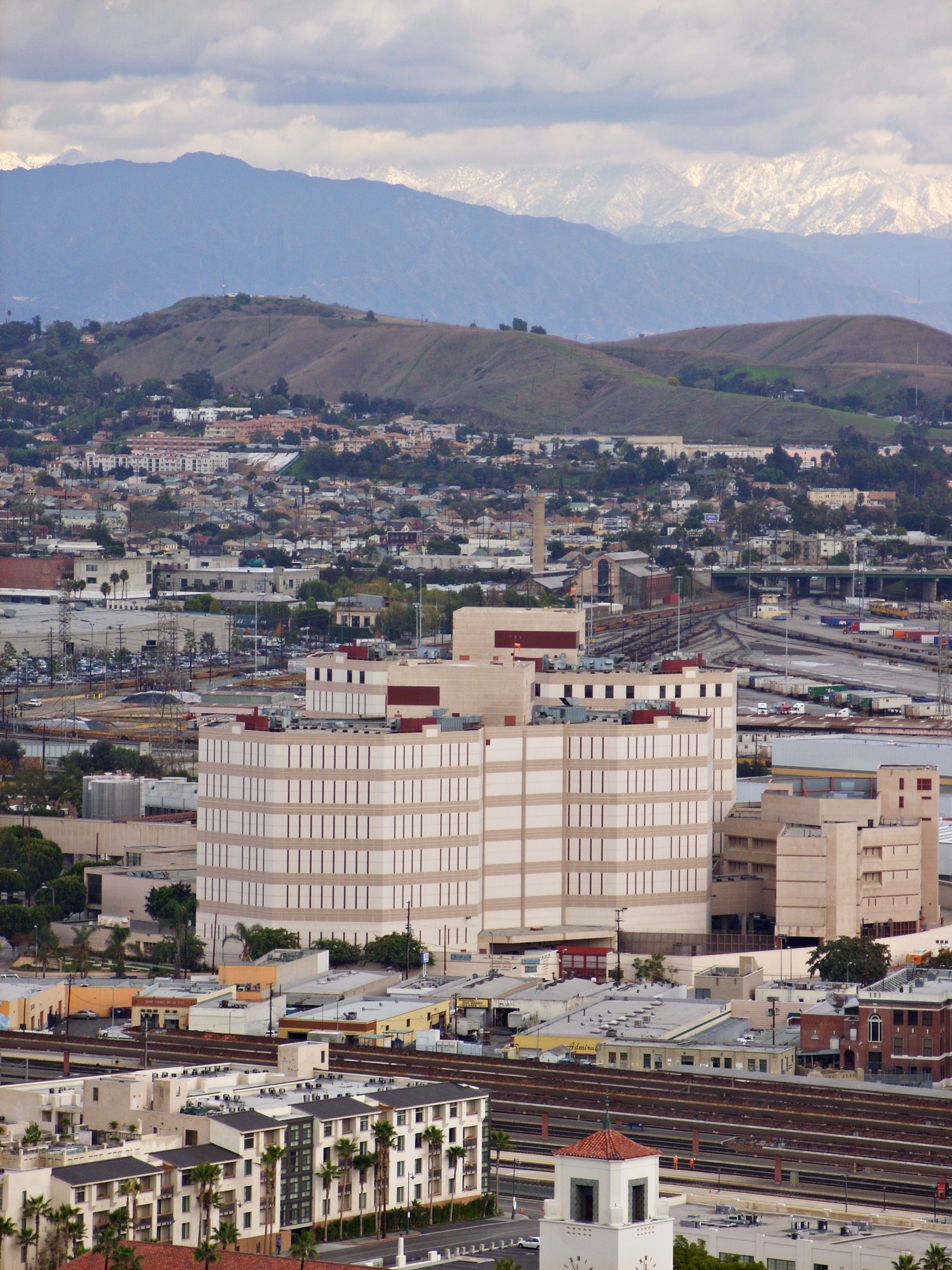
Los Angeles Twin Towers Facility

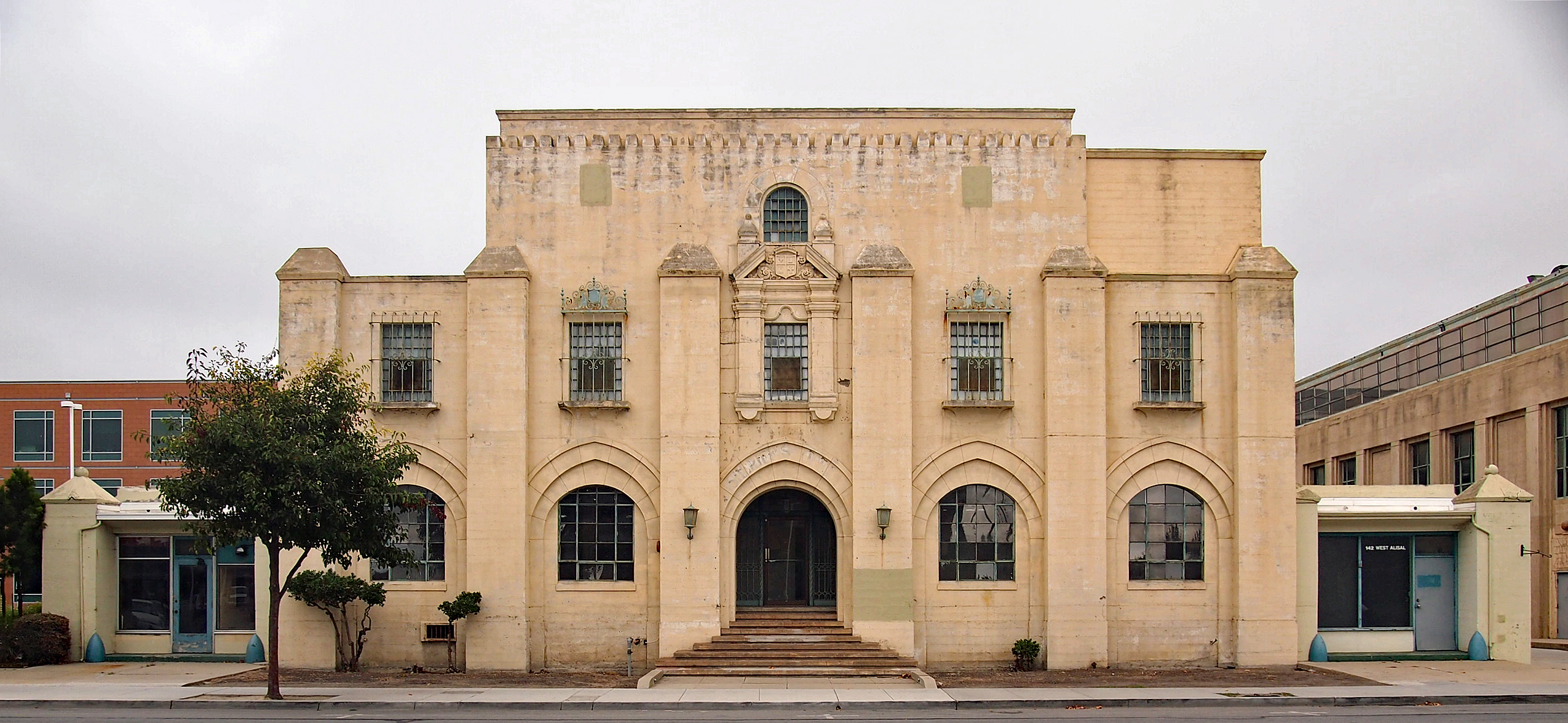
Monterey County Jail

The San Francisco Hall of Justice Complex, including County Jail #4

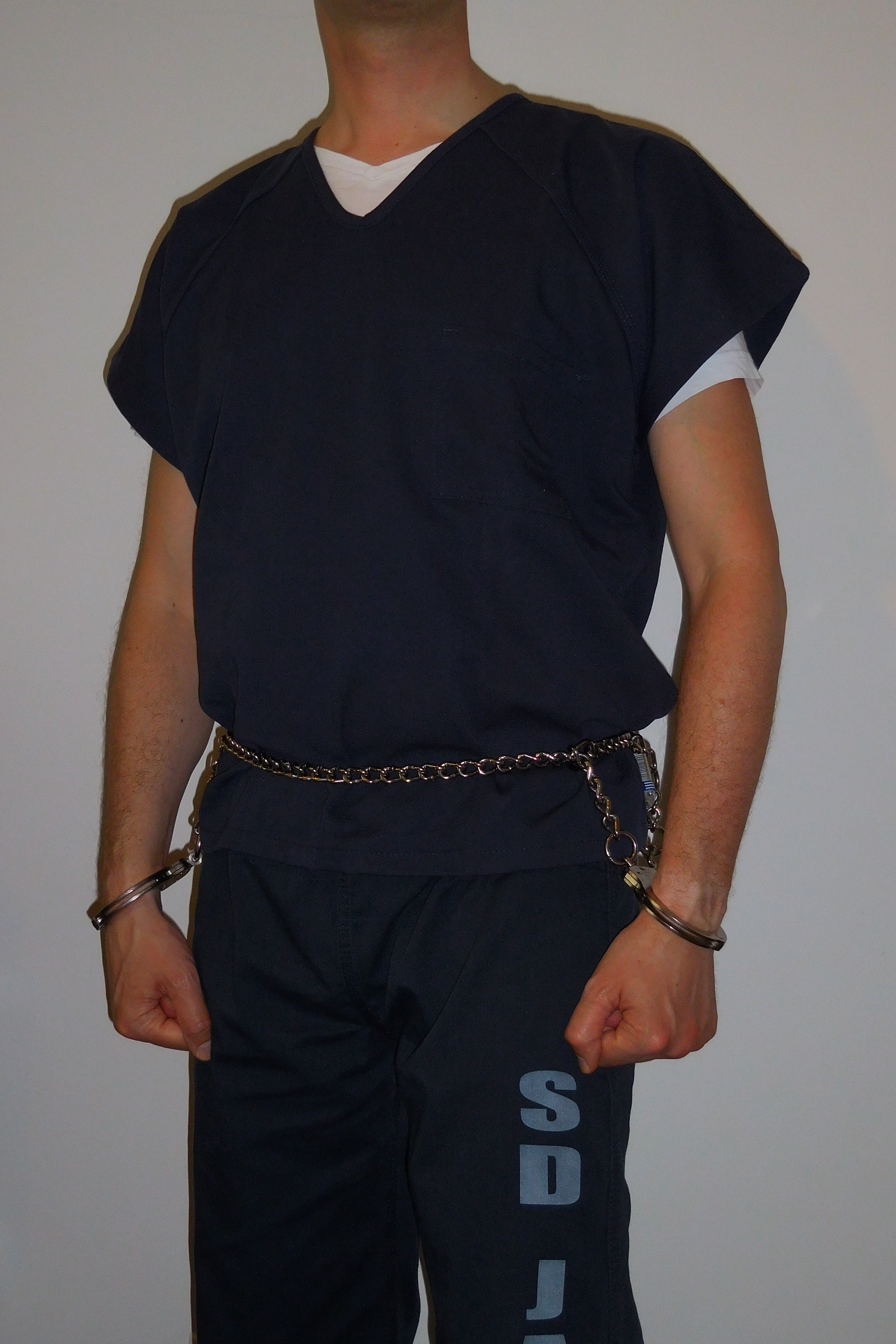
San Diego jail inmate, dressed in a dark blue two piece uniform, restrained with handcuffs on a belly chain

== California county jails ==
Rated capacity and average daily population reports from the California Board of State and Community Corrections were used to determine what constitutes a distinct jail facility for this list.

| Jail | County | Rated Capacity | Average Daily Population (ADP) | Notes |
|---|---|---|---|---|
| Santa Rita Jail | Alameda | 3489 | 2563 | |
| Amador County Jail | Amador | 76 | 94 | |
| Butte County Jail | Butte | 614 | 538 | |
| Calaveras County Adult Detention Facility | Calaveras | 128 | 100 | |
| Colusa County Jail | Colusa | 92 | 59 | |
| Marsh Creek Detention Facility | Contra Costa | 188 | 49 | |
| Martinez Detention Facility | Contra Costa | 695 | 418 | |
| West County Detention Facility | Contra Costa | 1104 | 628 | |
| Del Norte County Jail | Del Norte | 146 | 104 | |
| El Dorado County Jail, Placerville | El Dorado | 303 | 243 | |
| El Dorado County Jail, South Lake Tahoe | El Dorado | 158 | 140 | |
| Fresno County Main Jail | Fresno | 1064 | 952 | The Fresno County Sheriff has been under a Federal Consent Decree since 1993 in response to chronic overcrowding. |
| Fresno North Annex Jail | Fresno | 1152 | 1564 | The Fresno County Sheriff has been under a Federal Consent Decree since 1993 in response to chronic overcrowding. |
| Fresno South Annex Jail | Fresno | 528 | 416 | The Fresno County Sheriff has been under a Federal Consent Decree since 1993 in response to chronic overcrowding. |
| Glenn County Adult Detention Facility | Glenn | 144 | 96 | |
| Humboldt County Correctional Facility | Humboldt | 417 | 388 | |
| Herbert Hughes Correctional Center | Imperial | 314 | 150 | |
| Imperial Adult Regional Facility | Imperial | 288 | 204 | |
| Imperial County Oren Fox Detention Facility | Imperial | 276 | 32 | The facility opened in 2018 with funds allocated under AB 900, County Jail Funding & Reentry Facilities. |
| Inyo County Jail | Inyo | 96 | 39 | |
| Kern County Central Receiving Facility | Kern | 292 | 126 | |
| Lerdo Justice Facility | Kern | 796 | 701 | |
| Lerdo Maximum/Medium Security Facility | Kern | 374 | 152 | |
| Lerdo Pre-Trial Facility | Kern | 1344 | 870 | |
| Kings County Jail | Kings | 373 | 561 | |
| Lake County Hill Road Facility | Lake | 286 | 249 | |
| Lassen County Adult Detention Facility | Lassen | 231 | 94 | |
| Los Angeles Century Regional Detention Facility | Los Angeles | 1708 | 2148 | |
| Los Angeles Men's Central Jail | Los Angeles | 3512 | 4506 | |
| Los Angeles North County Correctional Facility | Los Angeles | 2214 | 3783 | |
| Los Angeles Pitchess Detention Center East Facility | Los Angeles | 926 | 72 | The facility is currently closed, but is being used as a fire camp. |
| Los Angeles Pitchess North Facility | Los Angeles | 832 | 1421 | |
| Los Angeles Pitchess South Facility | Los Angeles | 782 | 1455 | |
| Los Angeles Twin Towers Correctional Facility | Los Angeles | 2432 | 3318 | Stated by the Sheriff's Office to be the world's largest jail and the world's largest mental health facility. |
| Madera Adult Correctional Facility | Madera | 560 | 460 | The facility was run by the Madera County Department of Corrections, and not the Sheriff as is typical in California. As of 2021, the Department of Corrections was folded back into the Sheriff's Office. |
| Marin County Jail | Marin | 349 | 265 | |
| Mariposa County Adult Detention Facility | Mariposa | 58 | 43 | Voted best County Jail in California. |
| Mendocino Adult Detention Facility | Mendocino County | 295 | 284 | |
| John Latorraca Correctional Center | Merced | 564 | 416 | |
| Merced County Jail | Merced | 189 | 176 | |
| Modoc County Jail | Modoc | 43 | 39 | |
| Mono County Jail | Mono | 48 | 26 | |
| Monterey County Jail | Monterey | 575 | 669 | |
| Monterey County Rehabilitation Facility | Monterey | 250 | 181 | |
| Napa County Jail | Napa | 276 | 237 | The jail is run by the Napa County Department of Corrections, and not the Sheriff as is typical in California. |
| Wayne Brown Correctional Facility | Nevada | 284 | 195 | |
| Orange County Intake Release Center | Orange | 407 | 455 | |
| James A. Musick Facility | Orange | 449 | 0 | The facility is under temporary closure for renovations as of July, 2019, and is expected to re-open in 2022. It was also an ICE detention facility. |
| Orange County Men's Jail | Orange | 1219 | 1209 | |
| Orange County Women's Jail | Orange | 274 | 294 | |
| Orange County Theo Lacy Jail | Orange | 2080 | 2894 | |
| Placer County Main Jail | Placer | 492 | 323 | |
| South Placer Minimum Security Jail | Placer | 120 | 91 | |
| South Placer Jail | Placer | 300 | 242 | |
| Plumas County Jail | Plumas | 67 | 60 | |
| Blythe Jail | Riverside | 79 | 114 | |
| Indio Jail | Riverside | 238 | 348 | |
| Larry D. Smith Correctional Facility | Riverside | 1458 | 1450 | |
| Robert Presley Detention Center | Riverside | 760 | 741 | |
| Southwest Detention Center (also called Cois Byrd Detention Center) | Riverside | 1142 | 1141 | |
| Rio Cosumnes Correctional Center | Sacramento | 1625 | 1624 | |
| Sacramento County Main Jail | Sacramento | 2380 | 1877 | |
| San Benito Adult Detention Center | San Benito | 142 | 121 | |
| San Bernardino Central Detention Center | San Bernardino | 772 | 732 | Also used by the United States Marshals Service as a west coast hub for the transportation and housing of federal inmates. |
| Glen Helen Rehabilitation Center | San Bernardino | 1070 | 901 | |
| High Desert Detention Center | San Bernardino | 2098 | 1235 | |
| West Valley Detention Center | San Bernardino | 3072 | 2465 | |
| East Mesa Reentry Facility | San Diego | 760 | 700 | |
| San Diego County Facility#8 | San Diego | 200 | 181 | |
| George Bailey Detention Facility | San Diego | 1380 | 1522 | |
| Las Colinas Women's Detention Facility | San Diego | 1216 | 782 | |
| San Diego Central Jail | San Diego | 946 | 950 | |
| South Bay Detention Facility | San Diego | 386 | 395 | |
| Vista Detention Facility | San Diego | 807 | 714 | |
| San Diego Work Furlough And Residential Reentry Center | San Diego | 483 | 335 | This facility is operated by CoreCivic, and is under the jurisdiction of the San Diego County Probation Department, rather than the Sheriff. |
| San Francisco County Jail#2 | San Francisco | 392 | 286 | |
| San Francisco County Jail#4 | San Francisco | 402 | 288 | |
| San Francisco County Jail#5 | San Francisco | 768 | 608 | |
| John J. Zunino Facility | San Joaquin | 1195 | 1019 | |
| San Joaquin County Honor Farm | San Joaquin | 493 | 290 | |
| San Luis Obispo County Jail | San Luis Obispo | 714 | 439 | |
| San Luis Obispo Honor Farm | San Luis Obispo | 63 | 50 | |
| Maguire Correctional Facility | San Mateo | 688 | 489 | |
| Maple Street Correctional Facility | San Mateo | 586 | 430 | |
| Men's & Women's Transitional Facilities | San Mateo | 88 | 39 | |
| Santa Barbara Medium Security Facility | Santa Barbara | 160 | 151 | |
| Santa Barbara County Main Jail | Santa Barbara | 659 | 707 | |
| Santa Clara County Elmwood Complex - Men's Facility | Santa Clara | 2399 | 2227 | |
| Santa Clara County Elmwood Complex - Women's Facility | Santa Clara | 634 | 350 | |
| Santa Clara County Main Jail | Santa Clara | 1350 | 663 | |
| Santa Cruz Blaine Street Facility | Santa Cruz County, California | 32 | 18 | |
| Santa Cruz Main Jail | Santa Cruz County, California | 319 | 282 | |
| Santa Cruz Rountree Medium Facility | Santa Cruz County, California | 96 | 67 | |
| Shasta County Main Jail | Shasta | 381 | 431 | |
| Siskiyou County Jail | Siskiyou | 104 | 86 | |
| Claybank Facility | Solano | 358 | 222 | |
| Solano County Justice Center | Solano | 712 | 231 | |
| Stanton Correctional Facility | Solano | 365 | 255 | |
| Sonoma County Main Adult Detention Facility | Sonoma | 848 | 721 | |
| Sonoma County North County Detention Facility | Sonoma | 561 | 264 | |
| Stanislaus County Public Safety Center | Stanislaus | 1014 | 803 | |
| Stanislaus County Public Safety Center Units 1 & 2 | Stanislaus | 384 | 281 | |
| Stanislaus County REACT (Re-Entry and Enhanced Alternative to Custody Training) Center | Stanislaus | 288 | 143 | |
| Sutter County Jail | Sutter | 352 | 250 | |
| Tehama County Jail | Tehama | 191 | 169 | |
| Trinity County Detention Facility | Trinity | 53 | 54 | |
| Bob Wiley Detention Facility | Tulare | 696 | 604 | |
| Tulare County Men's Correctional Facility | Tulare | 366 | 237 | |
| Tulare County Pre-Trial Facility | Tulare | 384 | 347 | |
| Tulare County Jail | Tulare | 272 | 237 | |
| Tuolumne County Jail | Tuolumne | 147 | 144 | |
| Todd Road Jail | Ventura | 796 | 770 | |
| Ventura County Main Jail | Ventura | 828 | 747 | |
| Monroe Detention Center | Yolo | 272 | 239 | |
| Walter J. Leinberger Memorial Center | Yolo | 120 | 70 | |
| Yuba County Jail | Yuba | 426 | 372 | Also an Immigration and Customs Enforcement (ICE) detention facility. |

The following counties do not have jails:

- Alpine County: jail services are contracted to El Dorado County and Calaveras County.
- Sierra County: this county does not have an official jail tracked by the Board of State and Community Corrections, but the Sheriff's website says that "as of March 17, 2015 the Sierra County Jail began operating as a Temporary Housing Facility".

== See also ==
- Incarceration in California
