= NCCF =

NCCF may refer to:

- North Carolina Coastal Federation, a citizen's group for protecting the coasts of the US State of North Carolina
- North County Correctional Facility, a maximum security county jail in Los Angeles County, California
- National Center for Children and Families, an alternate name for the National Center for Children in Poverty.
- Nevada Childhood Cancer Foundation
