= Federal Bureau of Prisons facilities in California =

Seal of the Federal Bureau of Prisons

The Federal Bureau of Prisons (BOP) operates or contracts with a variety of facilities in California, including United States Penitentiaries (USPs), Federal Correctional Institutions (FCIs), and Private Correctional Institutions (PCIs). Informally, these would all often be described as federal prisons.

As of April 2020, 13,315 people were under custody in BOP facilities in California. An additional 422 people were under BOP custody in privately-run facilities in California, and an unspecified number of people were under BOP custody in community-based facilities in California. Roughly 8% of the people in BOP custody are in California.

For comparison, the March 2020 California Department of Corrections and Rehabilitation (CDCR) population report described 182,579 people under CDCR control.

BOP facilities are separate from immigration detention facilities operated by U.S. Immigration and Customs Enforcement (ICE).

== United States Penitentiaries (USPs) in California ==
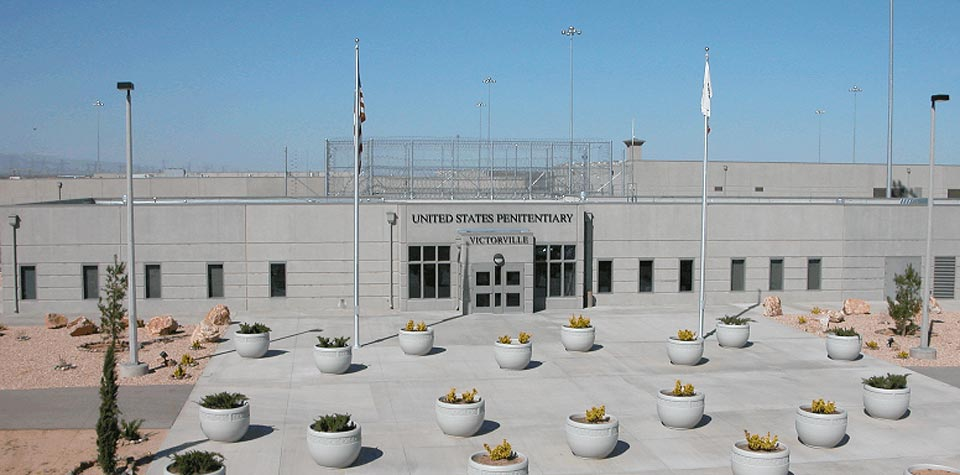
Entrance to USP Victorville

USPs are high-security institutions.

- United States Penitentiary, Atwater
- United States Penitentiary, Lompoc
- United States Penitentiary, Victorville

== Federal correctional institutions (FCIs) in California ==
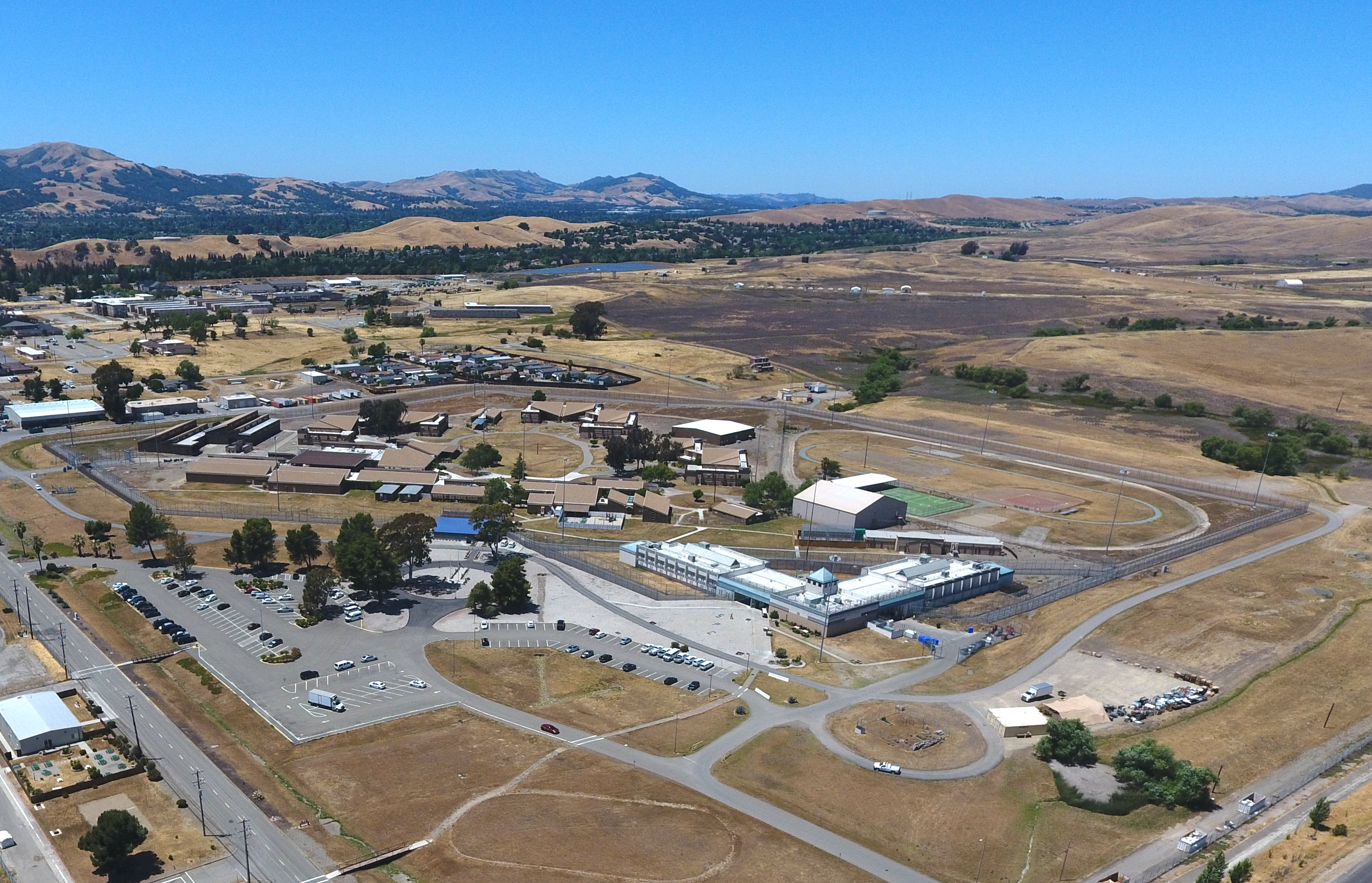
FCI Dublin, one of five federal prisons for women in the United States

FCIs are low- or medium-security institutions.

- Federal Correctional Institution, Dublin
- Federal Correctional Institution, Herlong
- Federal Correctional Institution, Lompoc
- Federal Correctional Institution, Mendota
- Federal Correctional Institution, Terminal Island
- Federal Correctional Institution, Victorville Medium I
- Federal Correctional Institution, Victorville Medium II

== Private Correctional Institutions (CIs) in California ==
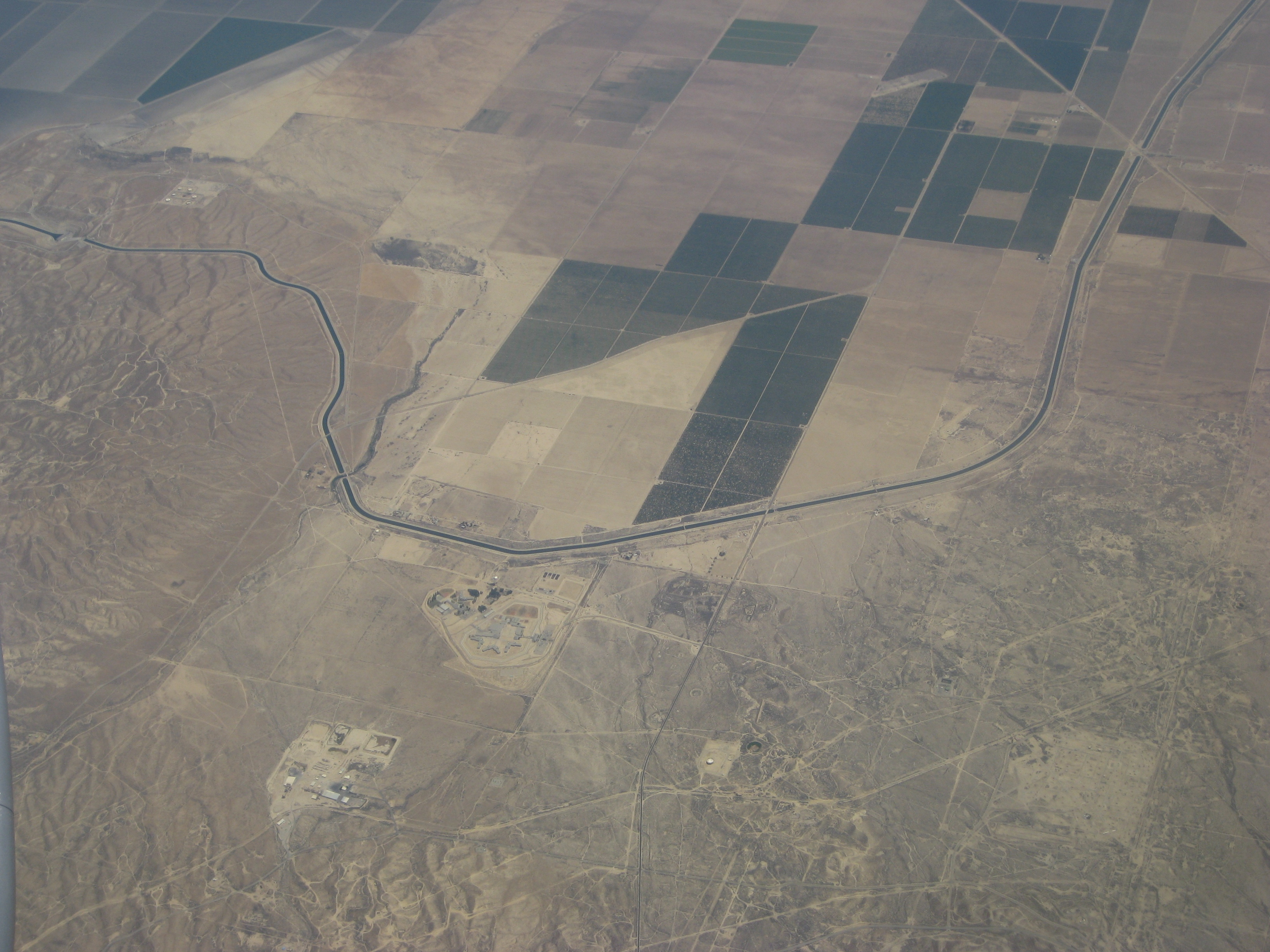
Aerial view of privately-operated Taft Correctional Institution

Private CIs are contracted by BOP to be operated by a private corporation.

- Taft Correctional Institution run by Management and Training Corporation (MCT)

== Federal Correctional Complexes (FCCs) in California ==
A correctional complex consists of multiple facilities that share some resources.

- Federal Correctional Complex, Lompoc (FCI Lompoc + USP Lompoc)
- Federal Correctional Complex, Victorville (FCI Victorville Medium I + FCI Victorville Medium II + USP Victorville)

== Residential Reentry Management (RRM) field offices in California ==
Per the BOP, RRMs "administer contracts for community-based programs and serve as the Federal Bureau of Prisons local liaison with the federal courts, the U.S. Marshals Service, state and local corrections, and a variety of community groups within their specific judicial districts. RRM Staff also monitor local Residential Reentry Centers which are responsible for providing federal offenders with community-based services that will assist with their reentry needs." Residential Reentry Centers, informally called halfway houses, are facilities run by private companies contracted by BOP.

- RRM Long Beach
- RRM Sacramento

== See also ==
- Incarceration in California
