= Autumn Jackson =

American interior designer (born 1974)

- Born: Autumn Jaquel Jackson; September 20, 1974 (age 52)
- Other names: Autumn Williams; Autumn Jackson-Cosby; Autumn Cosby
- Education: Tallahassee Community College
- Occupations: Kitchen and bathroom designer
- Known for: Extortion attempt against Bill Cosby
- Spouse: Antonay Williams (1997–present)
- Children: 2
- Status: Reconvicted (1999)
- Criminal charge: Extortion
- Penalty: Sentenced to 26 months imprisonment

Details
- Victims: Bill Cosby

Autumn Jaquel Jackson (born September 20, 1974), also known as Autumn Williams, is an American interior designer. She first came to media attention in 1997 for her extortion attempt against comedian Bill Cosby. Jackson had threatened to go to the tabloids with her claim she was Cosby's illegitimate child unless Cosby paid her $40 million USD. Jackson's disputed paternity claim against Cosby resurfaced in the media in 2014, as a result of sexual assault allegations against Cosby.

== Early life and paternity ==
Autumn Jaquel Jackson was born to Shawn Thompson Upshaw on September 20, 1974. The paternity has been disputed. Jackson and her mother have claimed that comedian Bill Cosby is Jackson's father while Cosby has denied the claim. In 1997, Cosby admitted to having an extra-marital affair with Upshaw in the 1970s. Upshaw also disclosed the affair with Cosby to the media in 1997, per interviews by the tabloid Daily Mail and the National Enquirer.

In 2005, following sexual assault allegations against Cosby from an athletics director at Temple University, Jackson's mother alleged that she became pregnant with Jackson after Cosby allegedly drugged and raped her. This allegation received renewed attention in 2014, when other women claiming to have been raped by Cosby came forward. Jackson's mother claims she had consensual sex with Cosby prior to the alleged rape, but she alleges the last time they were together, Cosby spiked her drink and raped her. Upshaw claimed that when she later found out she was pregnant, she knew Cosby was the father as he was the only man she was sexually active with during that time period. According to Jackson's mother, when Cosby was told she was pregnant, he persuaded her to put her former boyfriend Jerald Jackson's name on the birth certificate. She claims she agreed to do so to protect Cosby's reputation. Upshaw expressed concern that no one would believe her account as she first made her allegations to the supermarket tabloid the National Enquirer in 2005.

Jerald Jackson claims to be Jackson's father and is listed on her birth certificate as her father. Additionally, Jesus Vasquez, who is an ex-husband of Upshaw, has also claimed paternity. Jackson's mother claims she never had sex with Vasquez, who was a Mexican immigrant and former busboy.

Cosby says he paid over $100,000 over 20 years to keep the affair with Upshaw secret. The money went to a trust fund for Jackson, paid for Jackson's car, and her college tuition. While she was in college at Tallahassee Community College in Florida, Jackson says she and Cosby talked on the phone approximately 15 times. Cosby required that in order for Jackson's tuition to be paid, she was to maintain a B-average. When Cosby learned in April 1995 that Jackson had dropped out of college, he stopped having funds released from her education trust fund. Cosby reports he had told his wife about the affair but was concerned with what the media would do with the information.

Following new sexual assault allegations against Cosby in 2014, questions surrounding Jackson's paternity resurfaced in the media. In November 2014, former NBC employee Frank Scotti said he helped Cosby by providing women Cosby liked with up to $2000 per month, claiming one of those women was Jackson's mother, Shawn Upshaw.

== Extortion, conviction, prison ==
In 1997, Jackson, along with two others, attempted to extort $40 million from Cosby in exchange for not going to the press with her claims of being his daughter. At the time, Jackson was living in Burbank, California. Jackson believed the leverage she held over Cosby was that his public and professional image would be damaged if the affair and disputed paternity claims were revealed. Jackson was contacted by Cosby's lawyer who warned her that what she was doing constituted an extortion attempt. Jackson persisted, and sent Cosby a copy of the $25,000 contract she had negotiated with The Globe to sell her story.

Cosby's lawyers contacted the FBI, who covertly contacted Jackson using the guise of a settlement agreement. Jackson was persuaded to come to New York for the purposes of a sting operation devised to gain proof of extortion on her part. Jackson was subsequently arrested on January 20, 1997. During the ensuing trial, Cosby was represented by attorneys Jack Schmidtt; Paul A. Engelmayer; and Lewis J. Liman, son of Arthur L. Liman, while Jackson was represented by Robert Baum. On December 12, 1997, Judge Barbara S. Jones of the United States District Court for the Southern District of New York found Jackson guilty of threatening to injure another person's reputation with the intent to extort money, traveling across state lines to promote extortion, and conspiring to commit extortion. She was sentenced to 26 months in federal prison.

When Jackson began her sentence at the Dublin Federal Correctional Institution in April 1998, she was six months pregnant with twin boys. Their father was Jackson's then-boyfriend, now husband, Antonay Williams of Perry, Florida. In June 1999, after serving 14 months of her sentence, Jackson's conviction was overturned and she was released from jail, pending a retrial. She was also barred from contacting Cosby. In November 1999, Jackson's conviction was reinstated by the same court of appeals.

It has been suggested by legal experts that if Jackson had negotiated the original terms through a lawyer rather than acting on her own, she would have been able to avoid extortion charges and reach a settlement with Cosby. While citing Jackson's case as such an example, Eric Dezenhall described the nature of the legal strategy as "wrapping an extortion threat in a legal cloak." Criminal defense attorney Gerald B. Lefcourt stated that "Threatened lawsuits, and even filed lawsuits, are often no more than blackmail."

== Personal life ==
As a young woman, Jackson had aspirations of attending UCLA with the intention of studying film. Before the extortion case, Jackson worked for Spanish filmmaker José Medina and his production company. Jackson met Antonay Williams while both attended university at Tallahassee Community College in Tallahassee, Florida. On October 18, 1997, at Clearlake, California, Jackson married Williams in a private ceremony. On the marriage certificate, Jackson's father is listed as "unknown". As of 2014, Jackson works as a kitchen and bathroom designer and lives in Maryland.
