= Federal Correctional Institution, Dublin =

Former federal prison in California, US

Coordinates: 37°43′06″N 121°53′50″W

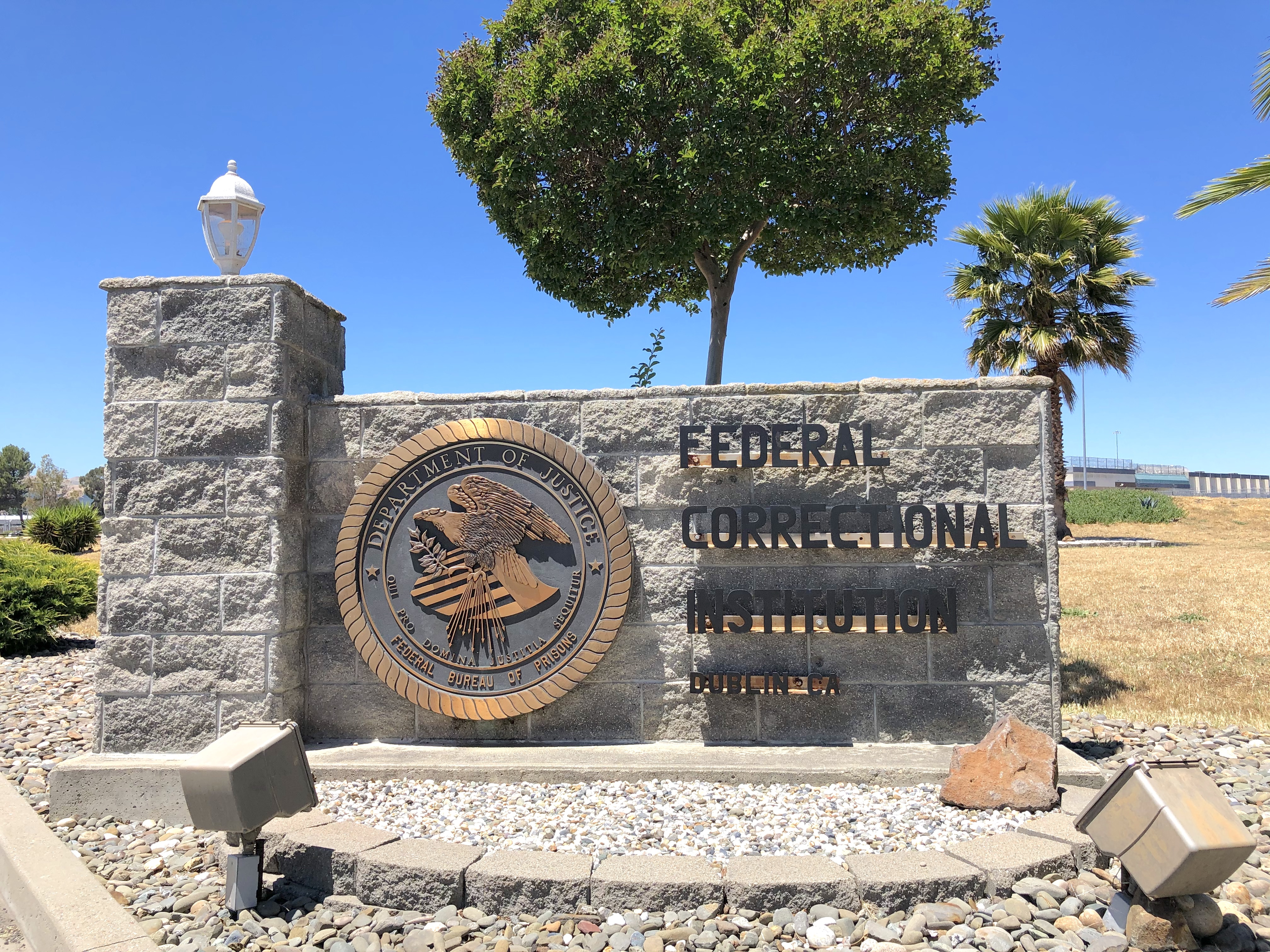
- Interactive map of Federal Correctional Institution, Dublin
- Location: Dublin, California
- Status: Closed
- Security class: Low-security (with minimum-security prison camp)
- Population: 726 (115 in prison camp)
- Opened: 1974
- Closed: April 15, 2024
- Managed by: Federal Bureau of Prisons

The Federal Correctional Institution, Dublin (FCI Dublin) was a low-security United States federal prison for female inmates in Dublin, California. The facility had an adjacent satellite prison camp housing minimum-security female offenders.

FCI Dublin was located 20 miles southeast of Oakland. It was located near Santa Rita Jail, which is operated by Alameda County.

FCI Dublin opened in 1974. It became an exclusively female prison in 2012 and was one of five federal prisons for women in the United States. In 2021 and 2022, the facility was embroiled in a scandal over a permissive and toxic culture of rampant sexual abuse by staff at the facility. After 60 Minutes aired a special in January 2024 titled "Agency In Crisis", the FBI raided FCI Dublin and shortly after, the Bureau of Prisons announced its closure on April 15, 2024.

== Facility and programs ==
Aerial views of Federal Correctional Institution, Dublin
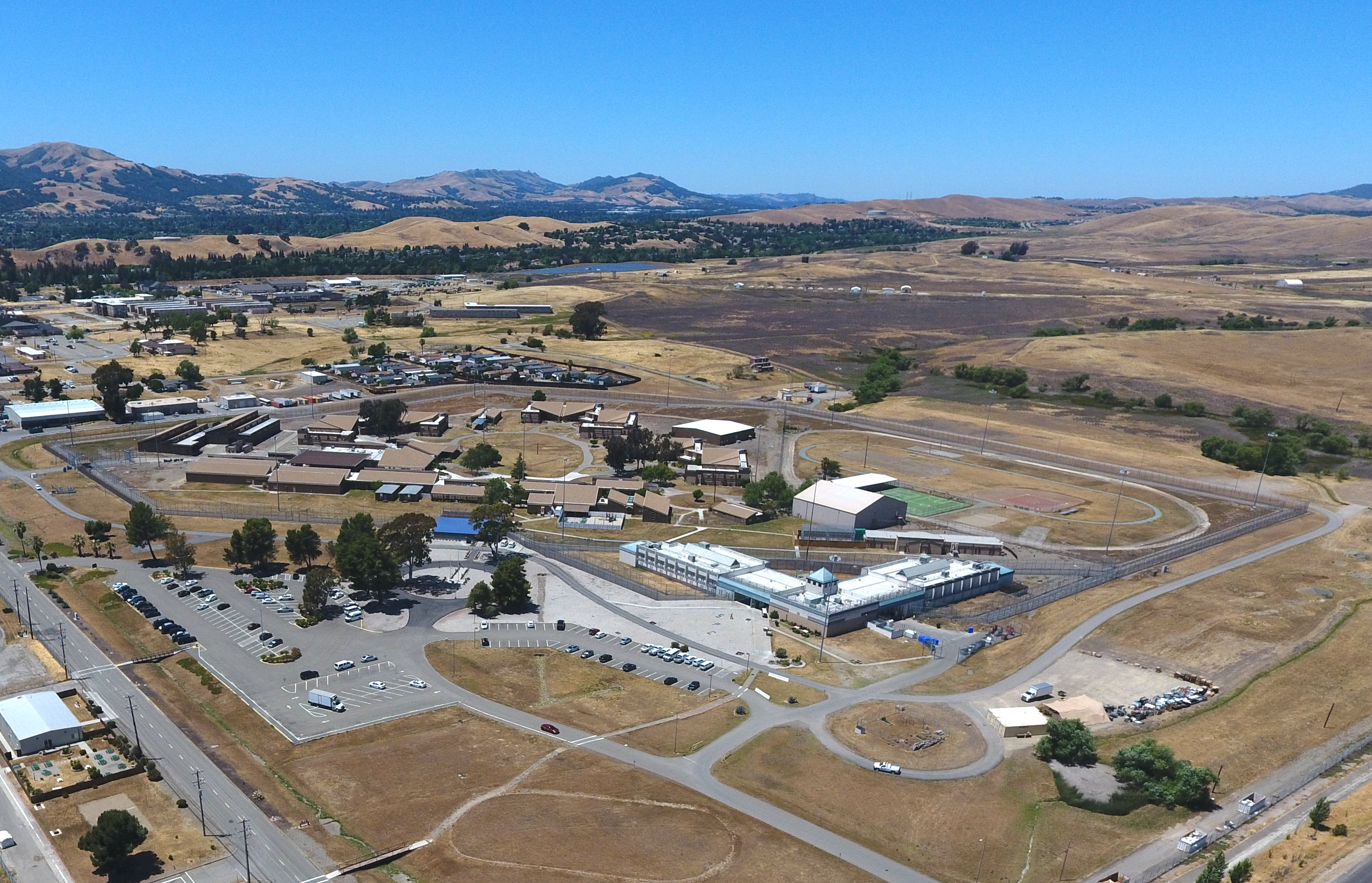
Front view of administrative entrance

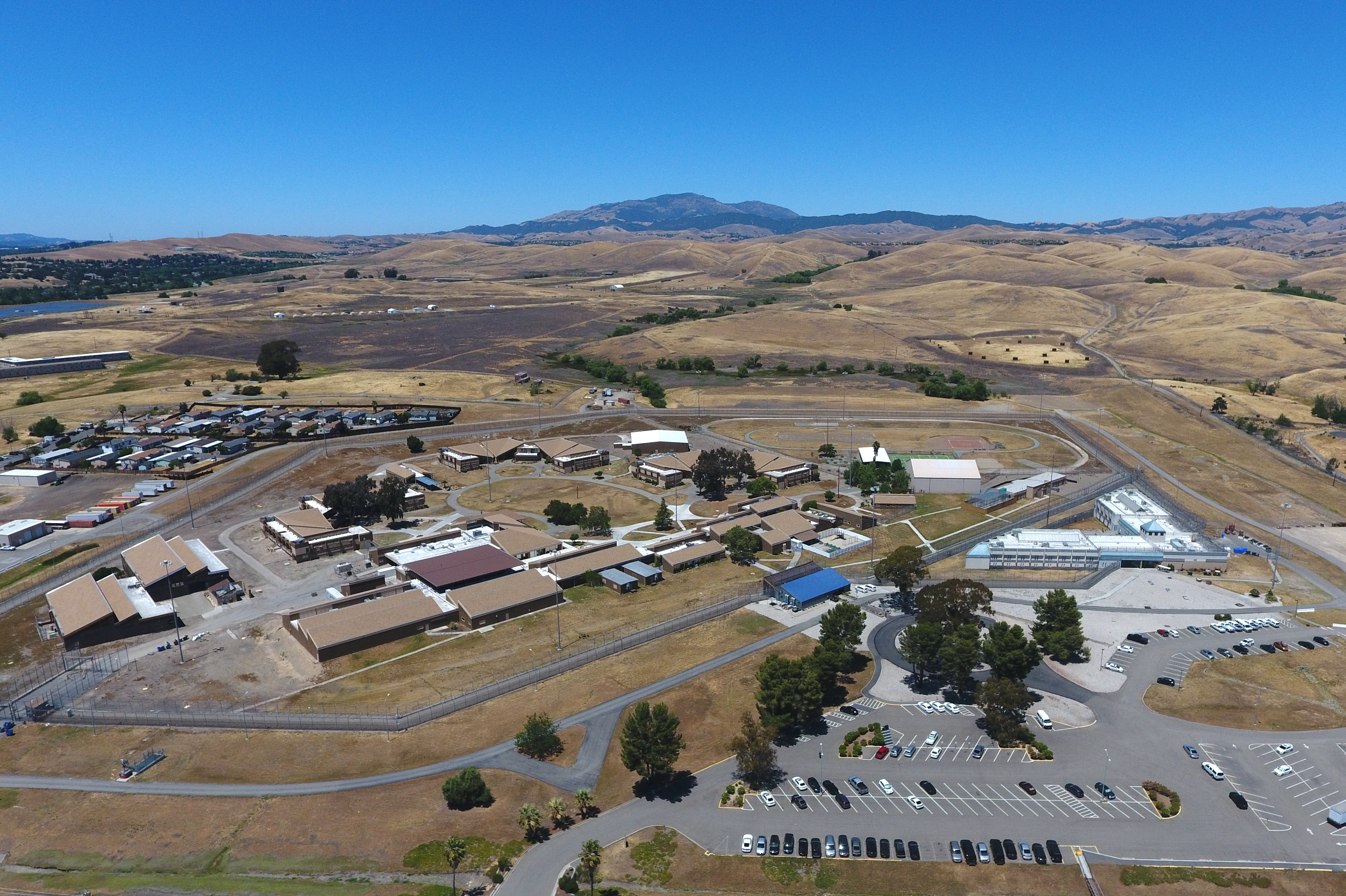
Housing units

The prison's education department offered GED and ESL programs, as well as courses in parenting skills. The prison also provided legal and leisure library services in addition to training in the use of various computer software.

There were two Federal Prison Industries UNICOR programs at FCI Dublin: the Textiles and the Call Center. Textiles employed approximately 150 inmates on the manufacture of custom draperies, parachutes, and disaster blankets. They also sorted and repaired USPS mailbags. The Call Center employed around 250 inmates on directory assistance inquiries.

It housed inmates who were serving an average sentence of 5 years. It had a design capacity of 250 inmates, but housed 1,077 as of April 11, 2013. Conditions were cramped, with three inmates sharing a cell on the top tier and four inmates sharing a cell on the bottom tier, designed to house a single prisoner. Meals were served in shifts due to the small size of the dining facilities.

Like most American prisons, FCI Dublin also contained a SHU (Secure Housing Unit), where any prisoners who were deemed to have broken prison rules were kept in segregation under a highly restrictive regime. Prisoners in the SHU spent more time locked in their cell than the general prison population, were only allowed out for limited amounts of time and had to be transported to and from their cell wearing handcuffs. Depending on the circumstances, an inmate might have spent weeks or even months in the SHU.

FCI Dublin was surrounded by two separate fences with a gap of approximately 10 feet (3.0 m) between them. Measuring 14 feet (4.3 m) high, each chain-link fence was reinforced with multiple coils of razor wire (at the top and bottom) plus electronic sensors to detect escape attempts.

The institution also had an adjacent administrative detention facility housing adult males on holdover or pre-trial status, and a minimum-security satellite camp housing adult female offenders, which opened in 1990. This minimum-security camp consisted of several old army barracks and these were torn down. The BOP removed a section of the FCI and placed approximately 200 female minimum security prisoners in this space. This facility was just short of an FCI. All the guards were rotated out of the FCI.

== Notable incidents ==
On November 5, 1986, Ronald McIntosh, who had escaped during a prison transfer one month earlier, landed a stolen helicopter in the exercise yard and escaped with Samantha Lopez, who was serving a 50-year sentence for bank robbery. Mr. McIntosh was serving a sentence for wire fraud when he met Ms. Lopez working in the business office of the prison and the two devised the escape plan. They were arrested by FBI Agents 10 days later and subsequently convicted of air piracy and escape. McIntosh received a 25-year sentence and Lopez had five years added to her sentence.

=== Sexual abuse of prisoners ===
A 2022 investigation by the Associated Press reported a "permissive and toxic culture... of sexual misconduct by predatory employees". The AP reported that inmates alleged "rampant sexual abuse by correctional officers", and that prisoners were allegedly "threatened or punished when they tried to speak up". The environment of sexual abuse was so notorious, the inmates and workers called the facility "the rape club."

In 2022, the prison chaplain was sentenced to 7 years in prison for repeatedly sexually abusing an inmate and lying to federal agents about the misconduct. Former warden Ray J. Garcia was found guilty of sexual offenses against prisoners and sentenced to 70 months in prison.

In 2023, 8 correctional officials from FCI Dublin have been charged and 4 have been sentenced for sexual abuse of prisoners. In February 2024, the California Coalition of Women Prisoners filed a class-action lawsuit against the Bureau of Prisons. Since the shutdown of FCI Dublin in April 2024, there are more than 65 former Dublin inmates who have filed lawsuits alleging sexual abuse by Bureau of Prisons staff.

== Notable inmates ==
†Inmates incarcerated prior to 1982 do not have an assigned register number.

Inmate Name	Register Number	Photo	Status	Details
Patricia Hearst	N/A†		Released from custody in 1979 after President Jimmy Carter commuted her 7-year sentence; served 21 months.	Granddaughter of publishing magnate William Randolph Hearst; convicted in 1976 of participating in a 1974 bank robbery with members of the Symbionese Liberation Army, who had kidnapped her several months before; pardoned in 2001 by President Bill Clinton.
Rita Lavelle	29753-112		Released from custody in 1985 after serving four and a half months of a six-month sentence.	Assistant Administrator of the Environmental Protection Agency for solid waste and emergency response under President Ronald Reagan; convicted in 1984 for perjury after an investigation of the Superfund program.
Michael Milken	16126-054		Released from custody in 1993 after serving 22 months of a 10-year sentence (later reduced to two years).	American billionaire financier who created high-yield bonds; convicted of securities fraud in 1990. His case was the largest criminal case in Wall Street history.
Lynette Fromme	06075-180		Paroled in 2009 after serving a life sentence.	Attempted to assassinate President Gerald Ford. Was transferred to FPC Alderson after a physical conflict with another inmate in 1979 and escaped from Alderson in 1987 only to be recaptured two days later and sent to FMC Carswell.
Sara Jane Moore	04851-180		Released from prison on parole on December 31, 2007 after serving 32 years of her life sentence.	Attempted to assassinate President Gerald Ford.
Stacey Koon	99752-012		Released from custody in 1995; served 24 months.	Former LAPD officers; convicted in 1993 of federal civil rights violations in connection with the 1992 beating of Rodney King; their acquittals in state court sparked the 1992 Los Angeles riots.
Laurence Powell	99749-012		Released from custody in 1995; served 24 months.	Former LAPD officers; convicted in 1993 of federal civil rights violations in connection with the 1992 beating of Rodney King; their acquittals in state court sparked the 1992 Los Angeles riots.
Greg Anderson	93389-011		First imprisoned in July 2006 and released from custody after serving more than a year. Imprisoned again on March 22, 2011 and released again on April 8, 2011.	Personal trainer for Barry Bonds implicated in the BALCO scandal. He was twice imprisoned for contempt for refusing to testify against Bonds.
Heidi Fleiss	03888-112		Released from custody in 1998; served 20 months.	Operated a prostitution ring in Hollywood, California which catered to high-profile clients in the entertainment industry; convicted in 1997 of tax evasion and money laundering; known as the "Hollywood Madam."
Pavlo Lazarenko	94430-011		Released from custody in 2012; served 8 years.	Prime Minister of Ukraine from 1996 to 1997; convicted in 2004 of money laundering and other charges for siphoning millions of dollars of public money into his personal accounts and attempting to hide some $21 million from American banks.
Josh Wolf	98005-111		Served 226 days in prison; released in April 2007	Convicted of contempt of court for refusing to hand over footage to the police regarding an anti-G8 protest in San Francisco.
Julienne Bušić	00308-183		Released on parole in 1989 after serving 13 years.	One of the hijackers on TWA Flight 355
Briana Waters	36432-086		Released from custody in 2013; served 5 years.	Members of the ecoterrorist group Earth Liberation Front (ELF) who pleaded guilty to arson, Waters in connection with the University of Washington firebombing incident and Zacher for setting fires at an SUV dealership, a poplar farm, and a police station in Oregon; several other ELF members were also sentenced to prison.
Joyanna Zacher	36360-086		Released from custody in 2012; served 5 years.	Members of the ecoterrorist group Earth Liberation Front (ELF) who pleaded guilty to arson, Waters in connection with the University of Washington firebombing incident and Zacher for setting fires at an SUV dealership, a poplar farm, and a police station in Oregon; several other ELF members were also sentenced to prison.
Autumn Jackson	43312-054		Served a 26 month sentence; released in 2000.	Convicted for extorting Bill Cosby, whom she alleged was her true father.
Stella Nickell	17371-086		Release date March 7, 2043; now at FCI Hazelton	Killed husband and innocent stranger by poisoned Excedrin capsules with cyanide. Caused manufacturer's US-wide recall of all non-prescription capsule products and 90-day ban on the sale of non-prescription medication in capsules in Washington State. First person convicted under federal product tampering laws.
Felicity Huffman	77806-112		Released on October 25, 2019; served 10 days.	Pleaded guilty in connection with the 2019 college admissions bribery scandal.
Elizabeth Henriquez	86706-054		Released on January 27, 2021.	Pleaded guilty in connection with the 2019 college admissions bribery scandal.
Lori Loughlin	77827-112		Released on December 28, 2020; served 59 days.	Pleaded guilty in connection with the 2019 college admissions bribery scandal.
Allison Mack	90838-053		Released on July 3, 2023; served 21 months.	Pleaded guilty to racketeering and racketeering conspiracy for her involvement in NXIVM, a sex cult that engaged in sex trafficking, forced labor, and racketeering.

== See also ==
- Federal Bureau of Prisons facilities in California
- List of U.S. federal prisons
- Federal Bureau of Prisons
- Incarceration in the United States
