= Santa Rita Jail =

County jail in Dublin, Alameda County, California

Coordinates: 37°43′2.17″N 121°53′16.53″W

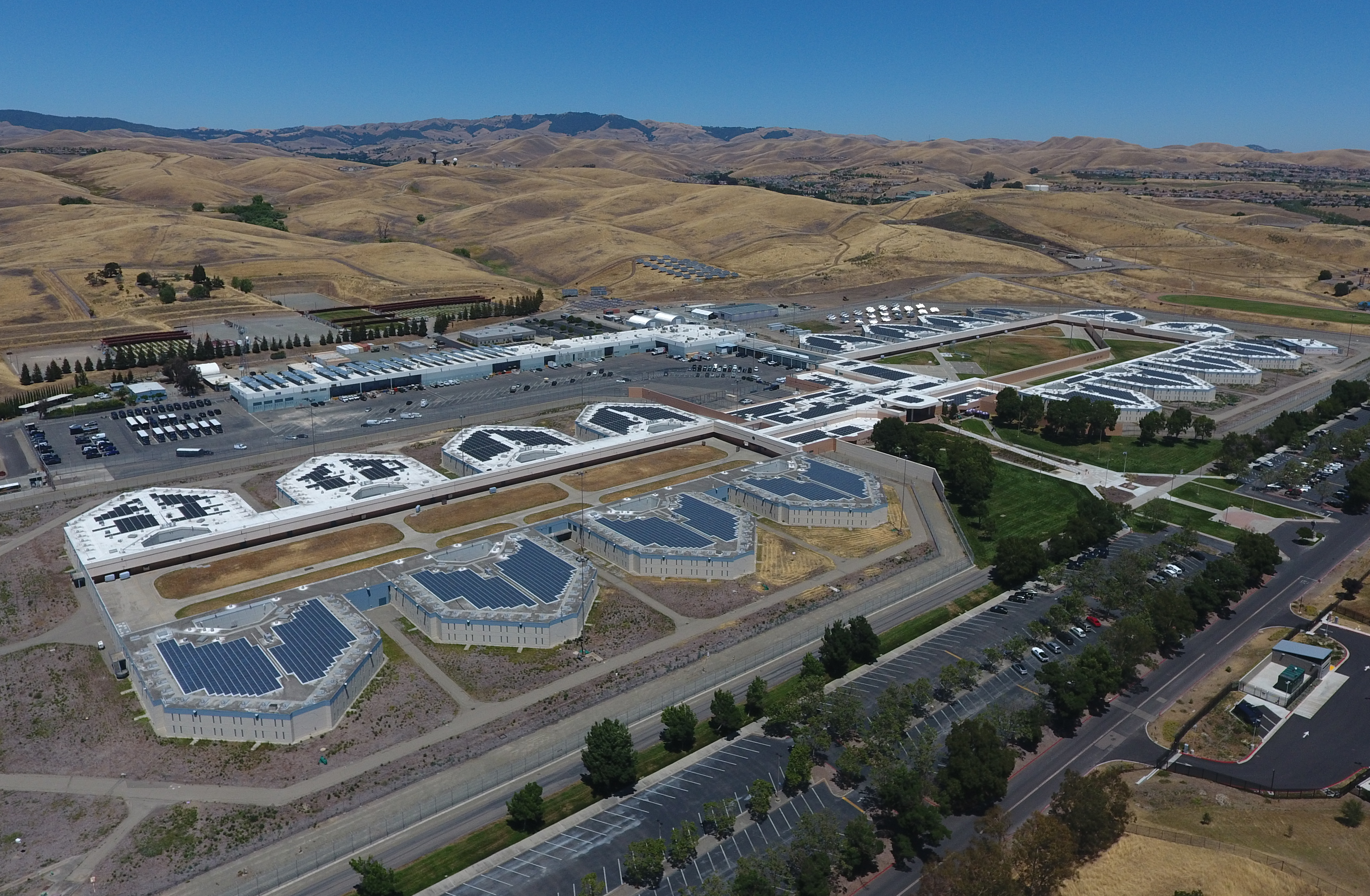
- Aerial view of the housing units at Santa Rita Jail.
- Interactive map of Santa Rita Jail
- Location: Dublin, California
- Status: Operational
- Security class: County Jail
- Capacity: 3489
- Population: 2563 (Dec 2019)
- Opened: September 1, 1989

Santa Rita Jail is a county jail located in Dublin, Alameda County, California, and operated by the Alameda County Sheriff's Office. With a design capacity of 3489, Santa Rita is one of the largest jails in the United States and larger than many California state prisons. The jail is adjacent to Federal Correctional Institution, Dublin, on the Camp Parks Reserve Forces Training Area.

Santa Rita has one of the highest rates of in-custody deaths for county jails in California, and has been the recipient of numerous lawsuits and class-action lawsuits regarding jail conditions and medical care. As with most jails, most of the people incarcerated in Santa Rita are in pretrial detention and have not been convicted of a crime.

== History and facilities ==
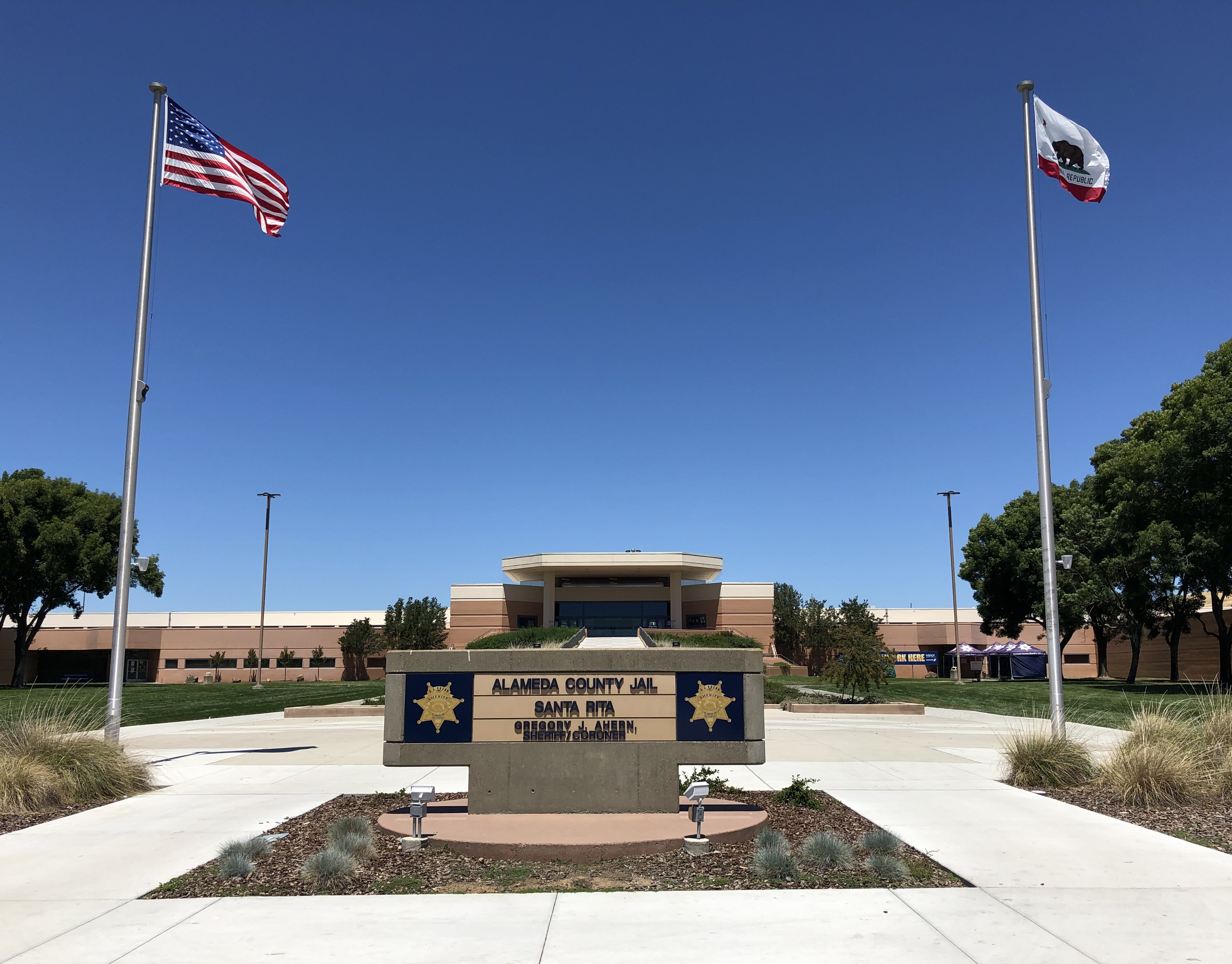
Administrative entrance to Santa Rita jail

The original Santa Rita Jail opened in 1947 as a replacement for Alameda's County Prison Farm. It was built on 1000 acres of Camp Shoemaker, a World War II naval base near the current site. By 1983, overcrowding had become an issue, and plans were established for the construction of the current $172 million facility, which opened in 1989. Funding for the jail's construction was obtained through state bonds and local county matching funds.

The current 113-acre (0.46 km^{2}) facility is laid out in a modern decentralized "campus" design, similar to many modern prisons, one-half mile long by one-quarter mile wide. The facility has 18 separate, self-contained housing units, a "core" building containing central booking, release, and administration, and a service building containing the laundry, commissary, kitchen, and warehouses.

Santa Rita is rated to house up to 3,489 people, making it as large or larger than many California state prisons. It is the third-largest jail in California and the fifth-largest in the United States, and is considered a "megajail".{{<cn}} An automatic robotic cart system moves all meals, laundry, commissary items, supplies, and garbage through the jail, allowing maximal restriction of prisoner movement throughout the facility. A 1.2-megawatt peak-power solar array was installed in spring 2002 on the roofs of the housing units, supplying nearly one-half of the jail's power demand during daylight hours. In May 2006, Chevron Energy Solutions deployed a 1-megawatt fuel cell system that generates 8,000,000 kWh of electricity and 1.4 million British thermal units (410 kWh) of waste heat (50% and 18% of jail's needs, respectively) from natural gas.

== Inmate conditions ==
Santa Rita Jail became known for dangerous conditions for inmates. At least 68 inmates died between 2011 and 2020, largely from suicides and overdoses. An investigation by KTVU found that for the years 2014-2019, Santa Rita Jail's death rate was 50% higher than Los Angeles County (13.6 to 8.9 deaths per 1,000 inmates) and was the highest in the Bay Area. The investigation noted that the use of isolated confinement exacerbated mental-health issues and may have driven more inmates to suicide.

In 2018, inmates filed a lawsuit alleging insufficient mental-health care. A US Department of Justice report released April 2021 found that the jail had become the county's largest provider of mental-health services, and that its inadequate provision of care of inmates constituted a violation of their civil rights. In February 2022, a federal judge approved a settlement calling for improved mental-health services and staffing, to the objections of some inmates and advocacy groups. The US Department of Justice would monitor the settlement for six years.

== Bomb range ==
The Alameda County Sheriff's Office bomb range is located behind the Santa Rita Jail.

It has become public by being featured in many episodes of MythBusters, and named as their favorite location in their "Top 12 Favorite Locations" special. The MythBusters often use this bomb range to safely and legally test myths regarding explosions, projectiles, and many other myths that cannot be tested otherwise without endangering civilians, made possible by the large, open landmass that gave them plenty of room to set their tests up, while giving a large distance to stand away from the blasts. In the special episode, Adam Savage praised the flexibility of the bomb range by rhetorically asking "What can't you do there?!"

On December 6, 2011, while conducting an experiment on the effectiveness of various projectiles when fired out of a cannon, a MythBusters television crew sent a cannonball through the side of a house and into a minivan in a nearby Dublin neighborhood. The projectile had missed its intended target and instead soared 700 yd (640 m), striking a house and leaving a 10 in (25 cm) hole, before striking the roof of another house and smashing through a window of a parked minivan.

== Cultural references ==
- Major portions of Tom Wolfe's novel A Man in Full (1998) take place at Santa Rita Jail, but the facility depicted in the novel was the pre-1989 jail, which used World War II-era barrack-style buildings.
- The Oakland-based hip-hop group the Coup has a track titled "Santa Rita Weekend" on their 1994 album, Genocide & Juice.
- In October 1967, singer Joan Baez, her mother, and nearly 70 other women were arrested and incarcerated in the Santa Rita Jail for actions during an antidraft rally. At the jail, where Baez spent 11 days (according to Baez's memoir, she had been sentenced to 45 days, but jail officials abruptly released her early, when they received word that a press conference was being planned for her scheduled release date), she met David Harris, an antidraft activist whom she would later marry.
- MC Hammer was arrested February 21, 2013, in Dublin for allegedly obstructing an officer in the performance of his duties and resisting an officer (according to "stop and identify" statutes). Hammer claims he was a victim of racial profiling by the police. He stated an officer pulled out his gun and randomly asked him: "Are you on parole or probation?" Hammer stated that as he handed over his ID, the officer reached inside the car and tried to pull him out. Police in Dublin, east of Oakland, said Hammer was in a vehicle with expired registration, and he was not the registered owner. "After asking Hammer who the registered owner was, he became very argumentative and refused to answer the officer's questions," police spokesman Herb Walters typed in an e-mail to CNN. Hammer was booked and released from Santa Rita Jail. A court date was scheduled, and police have until then to decide on any charges. Hammer tweeted that he was not bitter and considered what happened "a teachable moment".

== See also ==
- List of California county jails
- Solar power in Alameda County
