= Federal Correctional Complex, Lompoc =

Prison complex in California, United States

- Interactive map of Federal Correctional Complex, Lompoc
- Location: Lompoc, California; 34.678364°N 120.497158°W
- Status: Operational
- Security class: Low, medium and minimum-security
- Population: 1,500
- Managed by: Federal Bureau of Prisons

The Federal Correctional Complex, Lompoc (FCC Lompoc) is a United States federal prison complex for male inmates in California. It is run by the Federal Bureau of Prisons, a division of the United States Department of Justice, and consists of two facilities:

- Federal Correctional Institution, Lompoc (FCI Lompoc): a low-security facility.
- United States Penitentiary, Lompoc (USP Lompoc): a medium-security facility with an adjacent satellite prison camp for minimum-security inmates.

== See also ==
- List of U.S. federal prisons
- Federal Bureau of Prisons
- Incarceration in the United States
