= Golden State Medium Community Correctional Facility =

Medium-security prison in California, US

Coordinates: 35°40′11″N 119°13′40″W

- Interactive map of Golden State Medium Community Correctional Facility
- Location: 611 Frontage Road McFarland, California
- Status: open
- Security class: medium
- Capacity: 700
- Managed by: GEO Group

Golden State Medium Community Correctional Facility is a privately owned medium-security prison for men, operated by the GEO Group under contract with the California Department of Corrections and Rehabilitation to house a maximum of 700 state inmates at medium security. The facility stands in McFarland, Kern County, California.
