= Peter J. Pitchess Detention Center =

Detention center in Castaic, California, USA

Pitchess Detention Center
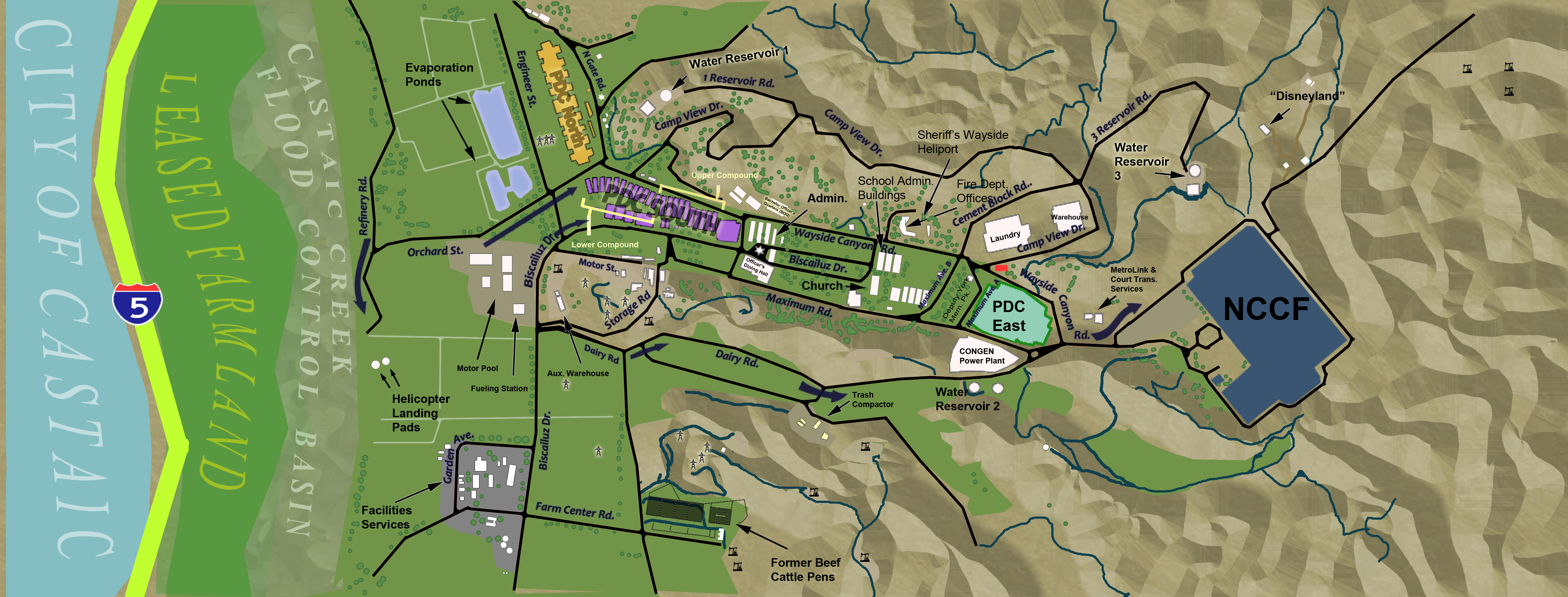
- Itemized map of Pitchess Detention Center

- Location within Santa Clarita Location within the Los Angeles metropolitan area Location within California
- Location: Castaic, California, U.S.; 34.4515°N 118.6098°W
- Status: Operational
- Population: 6,871 (2019)
- Managed by: Los Angeles County Sheriff's Department

Peter J. Pitchess Detention Center, also known as Pitchess Detention Center or simply Pitchess, is an all-male county detention center and correctional facility named in honor of Peter J. Pitchess located directly east of exit 173 off Interstate 5 in the unincorporated community of Castaic in Los Angeles County, California.

The 2,620-acre site was previously known as the Wayside Honor Rancho, Castaic Honor Farm, or the Wayside Jail (by which it is still sometimes known) and was nicknamed the Wayside Drunk Farm in the 1940s because of the large proportion of inmates serving time for alcohol-related offenses—when first built for prison use in 1938 it was a minimum-security facility where inmates worked on a farm setting. In 1983 it was renamed the Peter J. Pitchess Honor Rancho. All farming operations were terminated in 1992 and the "rancho" component of the center was closed altogether in 1995 because of budgetary constraints, at which point it acquired its current name. It is run by the Los Angeles County Sheriff's Department, and is divided into a North Facility, East Facility, South Facility, and North County Correctional Facility, each managed under different levels of prison security. In its current designation it was designed to house approximately 8,600 men either awaiting hearings or trial on a variety of crimes (i.e., "detention") or parole violators with sentences of up to one year ("corrections"), the two groups collectively termed "inmates". As of 1998 it was the county's largest jail complex. It is also the oldest operating jail in the county. The Municipal and Superior courthouses where Pitchess inmates are taken for hearings and trials include Van Nuys, San Fernando, Burbank, Pasadena, Newhall, Antelope Valley, Malibu, and downtown Los Angeles.

== North Facility ==
Built in 1987, the North Facility was originally built as a medium-security structure, although now it is classified as maximum security. It is made up of four modules each containing four dormitories (each with a sleeping area, dining area/ day room, and restroom), eight disciplinary cells, a multipurpose room, a medical center, a visiting center, and three security stations. It was designed to house 90 criminals per dormitory "block" for a total of 1,450 inmates. For the first four years of its existence it operated under the command of the South Facility before gaining its own unit commander and operations staff.

The North Facility unofficially closed in 2010 and currently houses less than a third of its capacity of inmates. Its only function at the moment is to handle overflow from the other three facilities.

== East Facility ==
Built in 1951, the East Facility, which once included a bakery and print shop where inmates received vocational training, started as a simple disciplinary housing unit for minimum-security inmates working on the farm. In 1957 it became the facility's first maximum-security jail. It was designed to house 110 criminals per dormitory block and had a maximum capacity of 1,830 inmates. It currently is designed to house approximately 850 inmates including 400 parole violators awaiting Morrissey hearings. It consists of two "hard lock" modules and an inmate processing area. As of January 2015, The Pitchess Detention Center East is closed.

== South Facility ==
Built in 1971, the South Facility is a medium-security jail that offers inmates vocational programs such as masonry, dog grooming, and carpentry. Some inmates work on crews at the county Fire Department's Fire Suppression Training Camp No. 12, which a sign on the jail grounds at one point affectionately called "Disneyland." It was designed to house 85 criminals per dormitory block and had a maximum capacity of 1,700 inmates.

The South Facility was curtailed between November 2001 and October 2007, during which it was called the North Annex.

=== Fire Camp ===
The South Facility's Fire Camp Training Facility currently allows those inmates convicted of non-serious, nonviolent, and nonsexual offenses (mostly victimless drug-related crimes as well as theft and fraud) to participate for several months in physically-demanding firefighter training and to do so under the supervision of local law enforcement. The program is the result of California Assembly Bill 109, the state's "realignment plan". Inmates participating in this program are distinguished by their orange jumpers. At the completion of the 80-hour program, the facility hosts a formal graduation ceremony.

== North County Correctional Facility ==
Overhead view of NCCF

Known as "SuperMax" and distinct from the North Facility mentioned previously, the North County Correctional Facility (NCCF), built in 1990, is considered a state-of-the-art maximum-security jail offering vocational training in printing, bakery production, and clothes manufacturing. It also includes a 16-bed hospital dormitory. The rest of the facility was designed to house 58 criminals per dormitory block and to have a capacity of 3,700 inmates.

== Women's Village Project ==
On October 26, 2012, the County of Los Angeles gave written notice of its intent to create a women's inmate facility within the Pitchess Detention Center. The 21-acre facility will require the demolition of most of the existing structures in the planned project area located adjacent to the South Facility. When completed, it will consist of a series of single-story "cottages" each containing a "pod" of beds and, when combined with beds in four existing structures which will not be demolished, will be able to house 1,156 criminals.

The Century Regional Detention Center in Lynwood is currently serving as an all female facility. It has a 2,100 inmate capacity.

== Other structures, facilities, and visitor services ==
- In 1951 Texaco discovered oil on the jail's property. Oil derricks still operate on prison land, as part of the Honor Rancho Oil Field.
- A cogeneration plant ("co-gen") was built in 1963 to provide electricity to the jail. It is located here: 34.4637°N 118.5939°W.

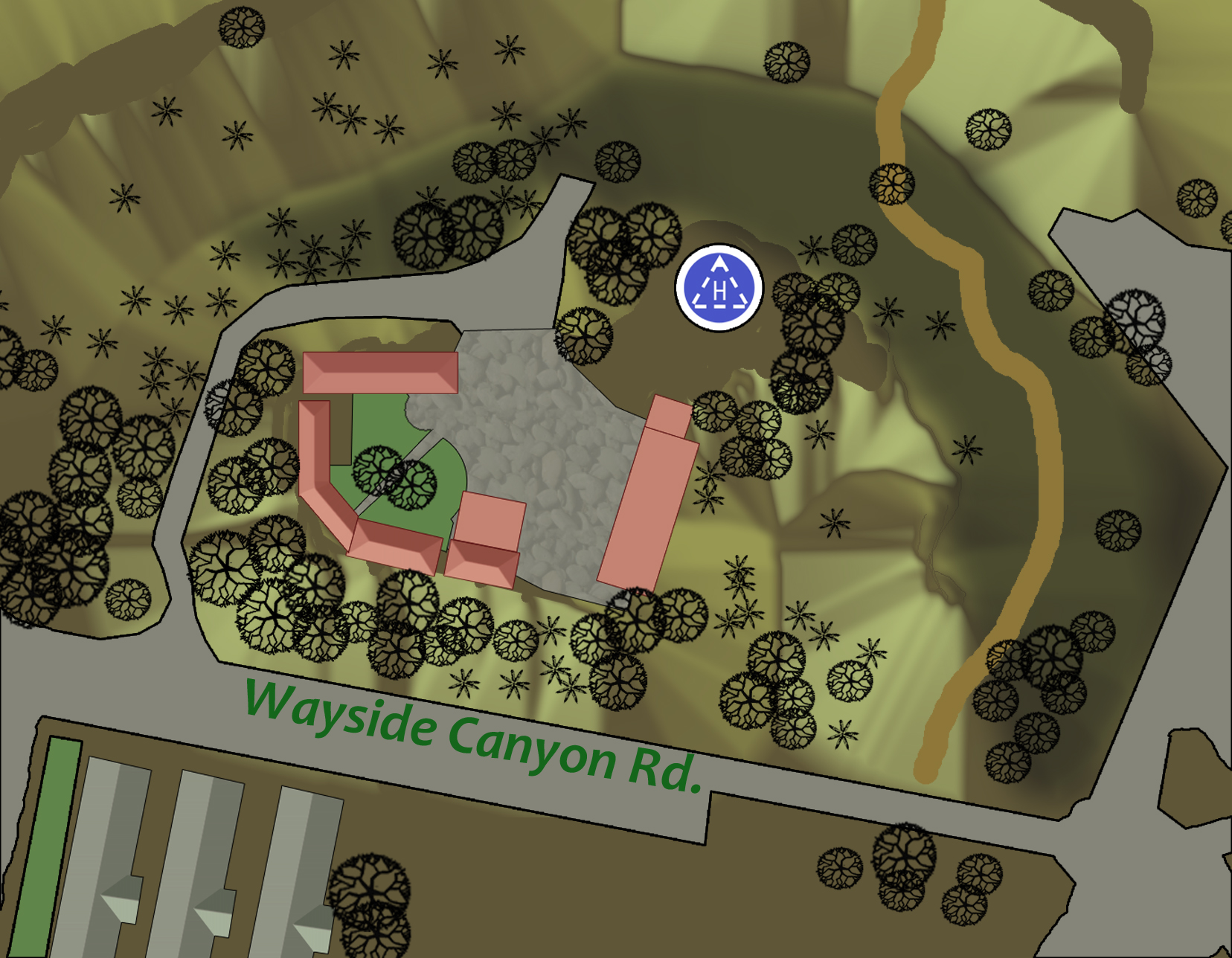
Overhead view of the Sheriff's Wayside Heliport. Heliport consists of cleared area of turf next to the Fire Department Offices.

- The center has a heliport called Sheriff's Wayside Heliport which became operational in July 1972 and is located here:34.4666°N 118.5953°W. Its Federal Aviation Administration Identifier is 81L. Two unofficial helipads are also maintained just southwest of the motor pool here: 34.4635°N 118.6095°W.

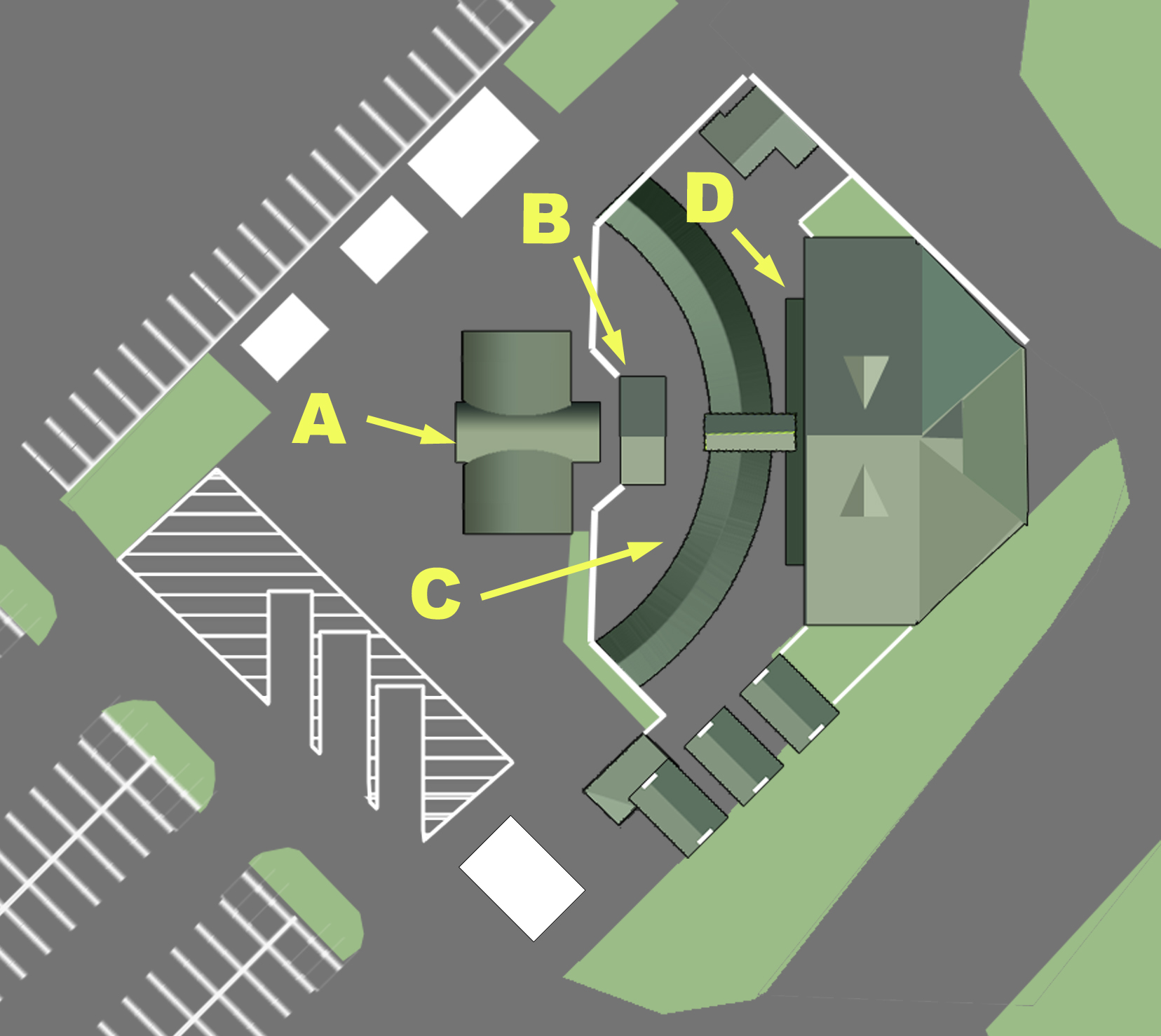
Elmer T. Jaffe Visitors' Center. A. Main entrance; B. Security checkpoint; C. Bus ticket windows; D. Bus waiting area.

- In 1993 the Elmer T. Jaffe Visitors' Center was built, located here: 34.4518°N 118.6103°W.

== Active Denial Systems ==
The Pitchess Detention Center in Castaic, California, is the most well-known facility where directed-energy weaponry—specifically the Active Denial System (ADS), colloquially referred to as the "pain ray"—has been tested for use on incarcerated individuals.

In 2010, the Los Angeles County Sheriff's Department (LASD) initiated a six-month pilot program deploying a scaled-down version of the ADS at Pitchess. This device emits millimeter-wave radiation that penetrates the skin's surface, inducing an intense but non-lethal burning sensation. The goal was to manage inmate violence without physical confrontation. The trial was funded by the U.S. Department of Justice's National Institute of Justice and monitored by Pennsylvania State University.

Despite the military's withdrawal of the ADS from Afghanistan due to concerns about its use on civilians, LASD proceeded with its deployment in the jail setting. Sheriff Lee Baca advocated for the technology, citing its potential to quickly de-escalate violent incidents without causing permanent harm. However, civil liberties organizations, including the ACLU, condemned the use of such technology in correctional facilities, equating it to a form of torture and a violation of human rights.

The public and legal backlash led to the cessation of the pilot program. As of now, there is no confirmed evidence that the ADS has been used operationally on inmates at Pitchess or any other U.S. prison. Nevertheless, the episode remains a significant example of the intersection between military technology and domestic law enforcement practices.

== Events ==
2018: 17 people were indicted on identity theft charges and charges relating to supplying methamphetamine, including to the Pitchess Detention Center, after an investigation into the Puente 13 street gang led by the DEA and the US Secret Service.

== See also ==
- Twin Towers Correctional Facility
- Men's Central Jail
