= Pay jail =

Prison cell improvement opportunity

Pay jail is a jail cell upgrade for non-violent offenders in jail costing from $75 to $171 a night.

== Amenities ==
Inmates are allowed to bring an iPod, cellphone, or laptop in their cell or watch TV in the common room. Some may even get to leave during the day to go to work. Inmates are allowed to roam the prison campus (which are not necessarily fenced). Prisoners are safe from prison gangs and other dangerous prisoners. They may have their food delivered to their cell rather than going the jail's cafeteria or they may choose to enjoy meals brought by their families during visiting hours.

Paris Hilton reportedly said that she chose not to go to a "pay jail."
