= North County Correctional Facility =

Correctional facility in Castaic, California, USA

Coordinates: 34°27′06″N 118°36′38″W

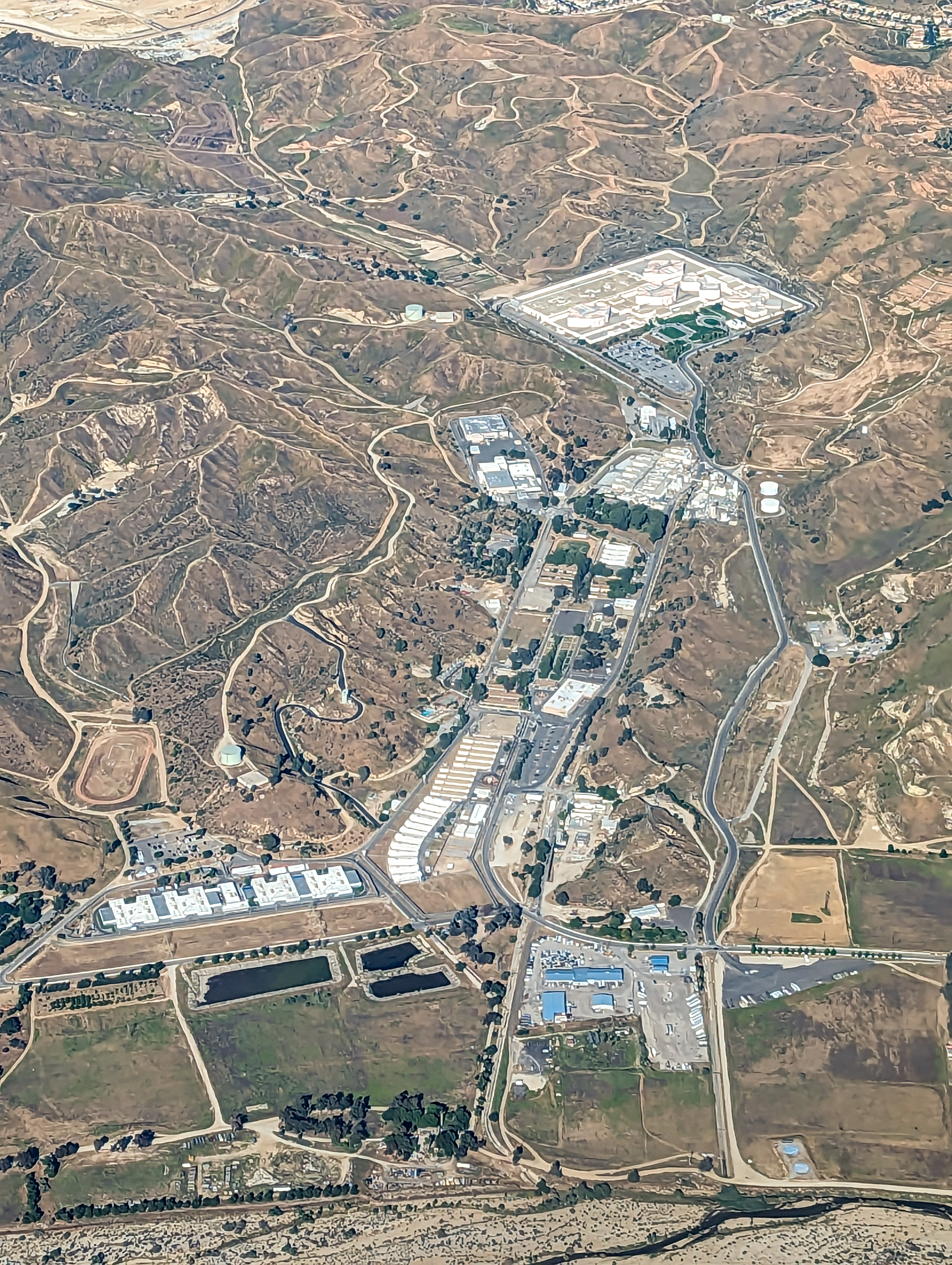
North County Correctional Facility, Los Angeles County aerial view

North County Correctional Facility (NCCF) is a Los Angeles County jail, run by the Los Angeles County Sheriff's Department. Located approximately 40 miles (64 km) northwest of downtown Los Angeles, it is one of four jails located within the Pitchess Detention Center (named after former Sheriff Peter J. Pitchess), in Castaic, California.

Construction began in 1985. The facility was formally dedicated on March 1, 1990 by Sheriff Sherman Block and President of the United States George H. W. Bush. NCCF consists of five jails within the same facility. As of December of 2024, it has an ADP (Average Daily Population) of 2633 inmates, 522 sentenced males and 2111 unsentenced males. It can provide for disciplinary segregation and clinic-level medical treatment.

The facility is commonly referred to as the "Flagship"; it was designed and constructed to be cost-efficient with regard to the ratio of staff members to inmates and vocational productivity. NCCF has a ratio of ten inmates to each staff member. The facility features educational, vocational and counseling programs. These programs have been designed to assist the facility's inmates in becoming self-sufficient within the law.

== Incidents ==
On Saturday, February 4, 2006, a prison riot at the facility injured over 100 inmates. Nine inmates were critically injured, and eight had minor injuries. One inmate was pronounced dead at the scene. Numerous ambulances were summoned to the remote facility after fighting began and custody personnel deployed tear gas to quell the disturbance. No law enforcement personnel were injured in the riot. According to deputies, the four-hour riot was sparked by racial tensions generated outside the prison between Mexican and African-American gang members. In retribution for a conflict between these gangs and in a show of the reach of their power, Mexican gang leaders had successfully ordered Mexican prisoners within the NCCF compound to drop furniture items from several stories above onto unsuspecting African-American prisoners below, with whom they had no personal differences.

On Wednesday, April 28, 2010, two inmates were discovered missing during a 3:15 a.m. headcount. The two were captured several hours later.
