= Prisons in California =

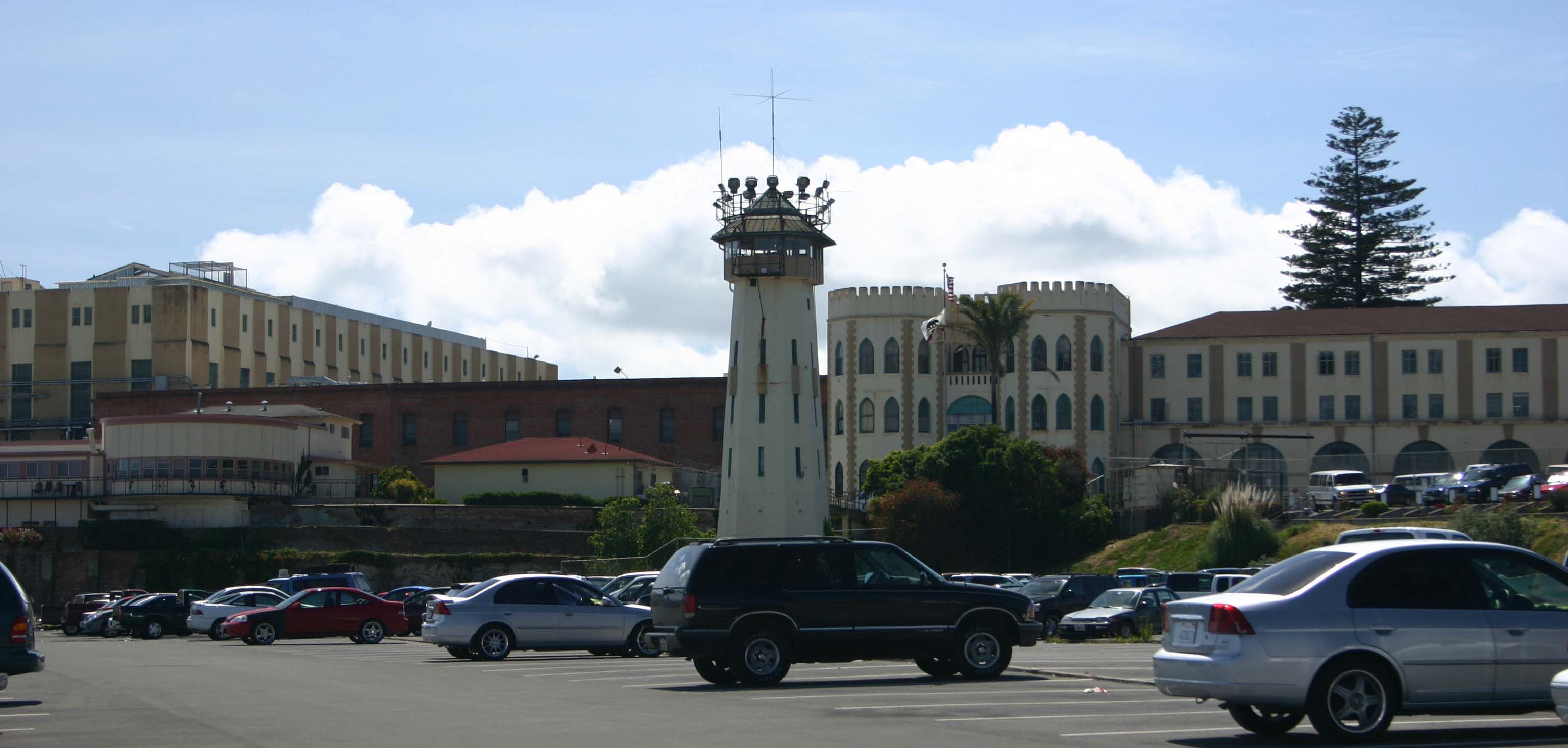
San Quentin State Prison

The California state prison system is a system of prisons, fire camps, contract beds, reentry programs, and other special programs administered by the California Department of Corrections and Rehabilitation (CDCR) Division of Adult Institutions to incarcerate approximately 117,000 people as of April 2020. CDCR owns and operates 31 prisons throughout the state.

The California Department of Corrections and Rehabilitation had a $15.8B budget for the 2019-2020 fiscal year, which was 7.4% of the state budget , and $13.6 billion ($13.3 billion General Fund and $347 million other funds) for CDCR in 2021-22. The state's prison medical care system has been in receivership since 2006, when a federal court ruled in Plata v. Brown that the state failed to provide a constitutional level of medical care to its prisoners. Since 2009, the state has been under court order to reduce prison overcrowding to no higher than 137.5% of total design capacity.

== Facilities ==
California's first state prison was the Waban, a 268-ton wooden ship anchored in San Francisco Bay. Men incarcerated on the Waban constructed California's oldest active state prison, San Quentin State Prison, which opened in 1852. California's newest state prison, California Health Care Facility, opened in 2013 as part of the state's response to the federal court ruling in Plata v. Brown that the state failed to provide a constitutional level of medical care to its prisoners.

CDCR owns and operates 31 state prisons. CDCR formerly staffed California City Correctional Facility, which was leased from CoreCivic from 2013 to 2024 as part of measures to reduce state prison overcrowding. Two facilities, California Institute for Women and Central California Women's Facility, are designated for women, and additionally Folsom State Prison houses men and women in separate facilities.

The Legislative Analyst's Office describes four special missions for specific California state prisons, which impact their design and staffing:

- Mental health
- Medical care
- High security
- Conservation camps (training incarcerated firefighters)

CDCR additionally makes the following designations:

- Reception centers: designed to house incarcerate people incoming to the state prison system while they complete an evaluation and receive a custody score. After that, they may be transferred to another prison for longer-term confinement.
- Reentry hubs: while all facilities have some level of education, treatment, and pre-release programs, reentry hubs provide specific reentry support to incarcerated people within 4 years of release, including cognitive behavioral therapy, job search skills, and financial literacy.

California has two death row locations for men at San Quentin State Prison and Corcoran State Prison. There is one death row location for women being Central California Women's Facility. While capital punishment is still legal in California, the last execution was in 2006 and Governor Gavin Newsom issued a moratorium on executions in 2019. See Capital punishment in California for further details.

== Major court cases and policy changes ==
Over the past 4 decades, the California prison system has been substantially shaped by a set of legislative initiatives that caused a large increase in the prison population, which resulted in severe prison overcrowding and unconstitutional living conditions. Those conditions led to a set of court cases that mandated a reduction in overcrowding and changes to prison services, which resulted in a number of legislative initiatives to reduce overcrowding and improve conditions.

Year	Event	Effect
1972	California Supreme Court decision in People v. Anderson	Struck down the death penalty. Proposition 17 reinstated it that same year. See Capital punishment in California for a full history.
1976	Senate Bill 42, Uniform Determinate Sentencing Act of 1976	The introduction of determinate sentencing and subsequent increases in prison sentence lengths was the largest driver in a nearly 900% increase in California's prison population over the next 3 decades.
1994	Proposition 184, Three Strikes Law	Part of a wave of "tough on crime" laws passed across the country, Three Strikes required a doubled sentence for any felony if the person convicted had a prior "serious or violent" felony conviction. It also required a mandatory 25-year-to-life sentence for any felony if the person convicted had two prior "serious or violent" felony convictions. Three Strikes was one of the largest drivers of California's increasing prison population over the next 2 decades.
1995	Federal class action civil rights lawsuit Plata v. Brown	The court ruled that CDCR failed to provide a constitutional level of medical care to its prisoners and ordered the state's prison medical care system be put into receivership. The receivership started in 2006 and is still active.
2007	Convening of three-judge panel in Plata and Coleman	Convened after California's state prison population peaked in 2006, this panel ordered the state to reduce its prison population to 137.5% of prison design capacity. The court order is still active.
2011	Assembly Bill 109, Public Safety Realignment	In response to the court mandate to reduce the state prison population, the state altered sentencing and supervision guidelines to shift responsibility for some prisoners to counties. Under Realignment, people with convictions for "non-serious, non-violent, non-sex" crimes serve their sentences in county jails and are under county community supervision upon release.
2014	Proposition 47, Reduced Penalties for Some Crimes Initiative	One of many responses to prison overcrowding, this approved ballot proposition change some felonies to misdemeanors, including some drug possession, petty theft, and forgery offenses. The proposition also permitted re-sentencing for people serving a prison sentence for one of the reduced offenses.
2016	Proposition 57, Parole for Non-Violent Criminals and Juvenile Court Trial Requirements	One of many responses to prison overcrowding, this approved ballot proposition allowed the parole board to release people convicted of "non-violent" crimes once they served the full sentence for their primary offense. It also required CDCR to develop uniform parole credits for good behavior and rehabilitative achievements, to incentivize rehabilitation.
2016	Proposition 64, Control, Regulate and Tax Adult Use of Marijuana Act	This approved ballot proposition legalized recreational use of marijuana. Following legalization, several district attorneys announced that they would apply Prop 64 retroactively, resentencing or dismissing thousands of marijuana convictions.

== Prison population and overcrowding ==
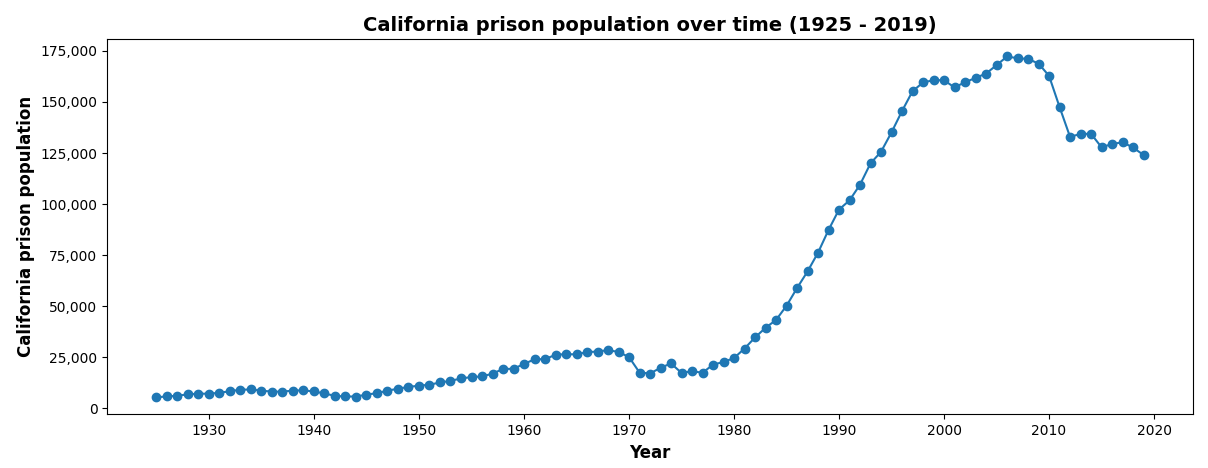
Graph showing the California prison population over time (1925 - 2019)

California's prison population grew dramatically after the passage of the Uniform Determinate Sentencing Act of 1976. The introduction of determinate sentencing and subsequent increases in prison sentence lengths was the largest driver in a nearly 900% increase in California's prison population over the next 3 decades. In 1994, as part of a wave of "tough on crime" laws passed across the country, California passed a Three Strikes Law that required a doubled sentence for any felony if the person convicted had a prior "serious or violent" felony conviction. It also required a mandatory 25-year-to-life sentence for any felony if the person convicted had two prior "serious or violent" felony convictions. 'Three Strikes' was one of the largest drivers of California's increasing prison population over the next 2 decades. The highest recorded CDCR daily prison population was on October 20, 2006, with 173,643 people under custody.

The California incarceration rate has ranged from about 0.1% of the population to about 0.5%.

In response to this population growth, between 1984 and 2005 California built 21 of the 35 prisons that CDCR currently operates in the state (see List of California state prisons for full details). Despite this construction, most of the prisons continued to be overcrowded. In 1995, the court ruled in federal class action civil rights lawsuit Plata v. Brown that CDCR failed to provide a constitutional level of medical care to its prisoners and ordered the state's prison medical care system be put into receivership. The receivership started in 2006 and is still active. After the state's prison population peaked in 2006, a three-judge panel was convened in Plata and Coleman. This panel ordered the state to reduce its prison population to 137.5% of prison design capacity. The court order is still active.

Since that court order, the state has taken several steps to reduce prison overcrowding. In 2011, California passed Public Safety Realignment, which altered sentencing and supervision guidelines to shift responsibility for some prisoners to counties. Under Realignment, people with convictions for "non-serious, non-violent, non-sex" crimes serve their sentences in county jails and are under county community supervision upon release. CDCR also contracted with private companies to incarcerate thousands of people in private facilities in other states.

Other legislative changes to reduce prison overcrowding include 2014 California Proposition 47, which changed some felonies to misdemeanors, and 2016 California Proposition 57, which allowed the parole board to release people convicted of "non-violent" crimes once they served the full sentence for their primary offense. Prop 57 also required CDCR to develop uniform parole credits for good behavior and rehabilitative achievements, to incentivize rehabilitation. While prison populations have been declining since their peak in 2006, as of April 2020, 32 of California's 35 state-run prisons have incarcerated populations above their design capacities, and 10 prisons have incarcerated populations greater than the 137.5% limit from the Plata and Coleman court order. Valley State Prison has the highest overcrowding rate, with an incarcerated population at 150.1% of design capacity.

== State corrections and rehabilitation costs ==
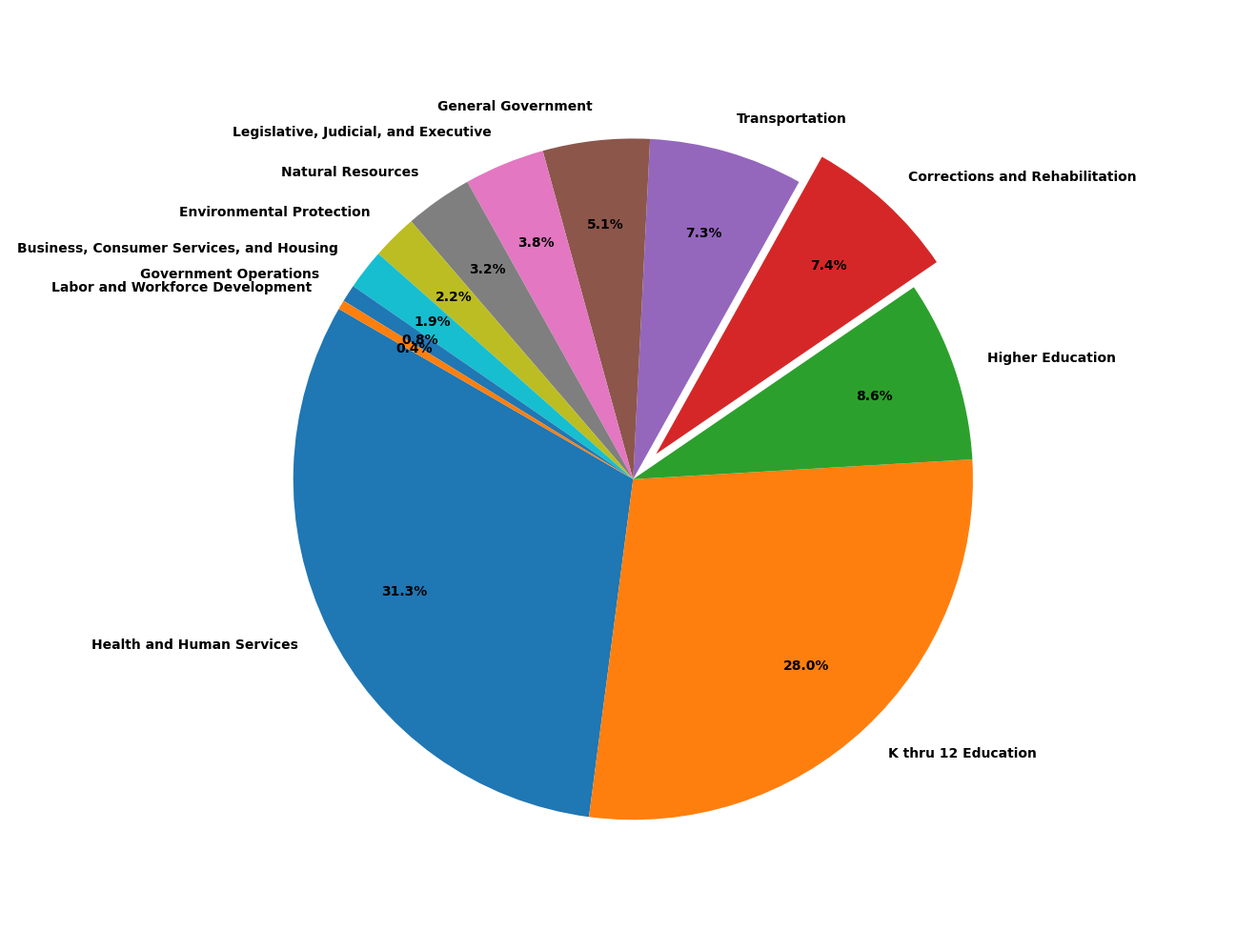
Corrections and rehabilitation as a percentage of the 2019-2020 enacted California state budget

Since the 2007–2008 fiscal year (the oldest year with enacted budget records maintained online by the state), Corrections and Rehabilitation has been between 6.3% and 7.8% of the California state budget. In the 2019-2020 fiscal year, Corrections and Rehabilitation had a state budget of $15,788,581,000, or 7.4% of the total state budget, and was the 4th largest agency area budget. The majority of that budget goes towards personnel costs, with an estimated 57,653 positions funded for the 2019-2020 fiscal year. CDCR funding is organized into the following programs:

- Adult Corrections and Rehabilitation Operations
- Adult Health Care Services
- Adult Rehabilitative Programs
- Board of Parole Hearings
- Corrections and Rehabilitation Administration
- Department of Justice Legal Services
- Juvenile Services
- Parole Operations
- Peace Office Selection and Employee Development

The costs to run prisons are substantially subsidized by the use of incarcerated labor. Incarcerated workers do meal preparation, laundry, janitorial services, building maintenance, and other activities necessary for the day-to-day operations of a prison. Incarcerated workers are paid between $.08 and $.37 per hour for their labor.

== Demographics and statistics ==
=== Gender ===
Prior to the passage of SB 132, CDCR divided the in-custody population into men and women. Men made up 95.5% of the in-custody population in 2018.

Prisons facilities are designed for and run based on a specific gender/gender identity. In 2019, the California state legislature passed SB 132, "The Transgender Respect, Agency, and Dignity Act", which will require that CDCR "house the person in a correctional facility designated for men or women based on the individual’s preference" starting in 2021.

Two prisons, California Institute for Women and Central California Women's Facility, are designated for women, and additionally Folsom State Prison houses men and women in separate facilities. All other prisons are designated for men. 3 of the 44 fire camps are designated for women.

=== Race ===
As of the most recent CDCR "Offender Data Points" report, the California state prison population breaks down by ethnicity as follows:

Ethnicity	Population	Percentage
Black	36,183	28.3%
Hispanic	56,275	44.1%
White	26,819	21.0%
Others	8,432	6.6%

=== Sentences ===
As of the most recent CDCR "Offender Data Points" report, the California state prison population breaks down by sentence type as follows:

Sentence Type	Population	Percentage
Determinate Sentencing Law	53,304	41.7%
Second Striker	33,415	26.2%
Third Striker	6,901	5.4%
Lifer	27,328	21.4%
Life without Parole	5,117	4.0%
Condemned	722	0.6%
Others	922	0.7%

Per the report, "Others" includes "those with commitment information not yet entered, those sentenced to prison for diagnostic evaluation, and boarders from other jurisdictions".

While California has a moratorium on the death penalty, it has the largest condemned population of any state in the United States.

=== Death in prison ===
While the last execution in California was in 2006, incarcerated people die in California prisons regularly. The most common cause of death in prison is "natural causes" (old age, chronic illness, or disease), followed by justifiable homicide at the hands of a law enforcement officer and then suicide.

There were 9,909 deaths in CDCR custody from 2005 - 2018:

Manner of death	Count
Natural	5697
Homicide Justified (Law Enforcement Staff)	1423
Suicide	984
Accidental	790
Pending Investigation	569
Homicide Willful (Other Inmate)	276
Cannot be Determined	129
Other	33
Homicide Willful (Law Enforcement Staff)	4
Homicide Justified (Other Inmate)	3
Execution	1

Most suicides are via hanging. Most accidental deaths are from drug overdoses.

== Prison conditions ==
The state's prison medical care system has been in receivership since 2006, when a federal court ruled in Plata v. Brown that the state failed to provide a constitutional level of medical care to its prisoners. Since 2009, the state has been under court order to reduce prison overcrowding to no higher than 137.5% of total design capacity. "The state spends millions of dollars each year in class-action litigation costs alone", often related to overcrowding or inadequate health care. In 2012, in response to multiple long-standing class-action lawsuits, as well as budget concerns and continuing overcrowding after Public Safety Realignment, CDCR published "The Future of California Corrections: A Blueprint to Save Billions of Dollars, End Federal Court Oversight, and Improve the Prison System", which articulated a strategy to improve rehabilitative programming, health care, housing, and parole operations.

In 2013, people in long-term solitary confinement in the Security Housing Unit at Pelican Bay State Prison initiated a hunger strike in protest of the state's solitary confinement practices. A subsequent lawsuit, Ashker v. Governor of California, alleged that long-term solitary confinement violated the Eighth Amendment's prohibition on cruel and unusual punishment, as well as due process under the Fourteenth Amendment. This court case ended the use of indeterminate solitary confinement in California.

== See also ==
- Incarceration in California
- List of California state prisons
- Three-strikes law: Effects in California
- Prisons in the United States
