= Uniform Determinate Sentencing Act of 1976 =

The Uniform Determinate Sentencing Act of 1976 was a bill signed into law by Governor Jerry Brown to changes sentencing requirements in the California Penal Code. The act converted most sentences from an "indeterminate" sentence length at the discretion of the parole board to a "determinate" sentence length specified by the state legislature. The act was one of the largest drivers in a ninefold increase in California's prison population in the two decades after the act passed.

== Origins ==
California created its first parole system in 1893 as a mechanism to relieve prison overcrowding by granting early release. In a 1914 California Supreme Court case, Roberts v. Duffy, the court declared: "the purpose of the legislature in creating a parole system [...] is to permit the liberation of a prisoner on parole at the earliest period when permitted by law and when on a consideration of the merits of each individual case, parole ought, in the judgment of the board, to be granted."

California adopted indeterminate sentencing in 1917, as part of a national trend towards indeterminate sentences meant to encourage rehabilitation. In an indeterminate sentencing framework, for most crimes the sentence is a range, for example "5 years to life". Under that sentence, after 5 years, or perhaps less time with good behavior, the incarcerated person is reviewed by a parole board periodically until they are found suitable for release. Per the California Supreme Court in 1918: "It is generally recognized by the courts and by modern penologists that the purpose of the indeterminate sentence law, like other modern laws in relation to the administration of the criminal law, is to mitigate the punishment which would otherwise be imposed upon the offender. These laws place emphasis upon the reformation of the offender. They seek to make the punishment fit the criminal rather than the crime. They endeavor to put before the prisoner great incentive to well-doing. [...] [T]he purpose is to strengthen his will to do right and lessen his temptation to do wrong."

The practical effects of indeterminate sentences evolved over the next several decades. The Prison Reorganization Act of 1944 established the California Adult Authority, which among other responsibilities functioned as the California parole board, with expanded power to review parole candidates using "psychiatric and other diagnostic aids" and to release prisoners. The Adult Authority became the in-practice sentencing agency for prisoners, because courts could only sentence "for the term prescribed by law", and the Adult Authority had broad discretion over when a prisoner was actually released. Because it had nearly all control over releases, the Adult Authority became a focal point for the press whenever someone released to parole committed a high-profile crime. This feedback loop resulted in the Adult Authority shifting to delaying parole until a prisoner was thought to be "ready to go home" — a different standard from the original goal that parole be granted as early as possible, to continue rehabilitation in the community.

A series of lawsuits and subsequent legislation in the 1970s laid the groundwork for a move away from indeterminate sentences. Morrissey v. Brewer required that parole only be revoked in accordance with due process, which invited scrutiny of all discretionary decisions in the prison system. California Supreme Court cases In re Lynch and In re Foss challenged the constitutionality of broad and variable indeterminate sentences under the cruel and unusual punishment clause of the Eighth Amendment to the United States Constitution.

The Uniform Determinate Sentencing Act of 1976 was part of a national trend towards determinate sentences during the 1970s, to provider greater sentencing equity. It had bi-partisan support, with liberal politicians and organizations like the American Civil Liberties Union of Northern California and the Prisoners' Union supporting the act because it theoretically provided greater sentencing accountability and procedural fairness, especially in regards to race, ethnic and educational background. Conservative politicians and law enforcement agencies supported the legislation because it reduced the Adult Authority's ability to release prisoners early and because they thought it would result in longer prison terms.

== Legislation ==
Senate Bill 42, aka the Uniform Determinate Sentencing Act of 1976, was written by state senator John Nejedly and signed into law by California Governor Jerry Brown. It went into effect on July 1, 1977.

=== Purpose ===
In a reversal from California's historical legislative belief that a primary purpose of prison is rehabilitation, the act amended the penal code to assert that "the purpose of imprisonment for crime is punishment":

The Legislature finds and declares that the purpose of imprisonment for crime is punishment. This purpose is best served by terms proportionate to the seriousness of the offense with provision for uniformity in the sentences of offenders committing the same offense under similar circumstances. The Legislature further finds and declares that the elimination of disparity and the provision of uniformity of sentences can best be achieved by determinate sentences fixed by statute in proportion to the seriousness of the offense as determined by the Legislature to be imposed by the court with specified discretion.

=== Sentencing Policy ===
Instead of leaving prison terms to the discretion of the Adult Authority, the act specified that the legislature must define lower, middle, and upper prison terms for most offenses. For example, robbery under indeterminate sentencing might have a term of "5 years to life". Under determinate sentencing, the lower, middle, and upper prison terms might be 5, 6, and 7 years respectively.

Some offenses, like first-degree murder, continued to have an indeterminate life sentence.

=== Sentencing ===
Under the determinate sentencing law, if a judge chose a prison sentence as punishment for a given offense (as opposed to probation), the defendant would be sentenced to the middle prison term unless aggravating or mitigating circumstances justified sentencing to the upper or lower term. The judge had to state the reasons for the sentencing decision.

The base term would then be extended by enhancements for specific details of the crime, for example the use of a firearm, great loss of property, or great bodily injury, as well as the defendant's prior criminal history.

=== Parole ===
Under the initial legislation, parole for most prisoners on a determinate sentence was limited to one year, with parole violations resulting in a return to prison limited to an additional six months in prison. Parole was reframed as an additive period of carceral supervision rather than a continuation of a prison sentence.

Parole release as a mechanism to reduce the prison population in times of overcrowding was essentially eliminated as part of the legislation.

=== "Good time credits" ===
As part of creating greater sentence predictability, the legislation formalized good time credits that would reduce a prison time by up to 1/3rd automatically unless taken away for misconduct or non-participation.

=== Other structural changes ===
The Adult Authority and the Women's Board of Terms and Paroles were replaced with a Community Release Board appointed by the governor. The Community Release Board was responsible for reviewing sentencing decisions for equity, hearing appeals to denial of "good time" credits, determining if parole should be revoked, and for applying the law retroactively.

The Judicial Council of California, the policymaking body of the California courts, was instructed to formulate sentencing guidance, for example when to grant probation, criteria for enhancements, and criteria for selecting upper or lower terms. The Judicial Council was also tasked with reviewing and publishing data on determinate sentences.

Prosecutorial discretion increased with the adoption of determinate sentences, as which charges and enhancements a prosecutor decided to pursue had a great effect on the sentence length. This in turn gave prosecutors greater leverage in plea bargains.

The general effect of these structural changes was to remove discretion from the parole board and increase the power of the legislature, the judiciary, and prosecutors.

=== Immediate amendments to determinate sentencing ===
Determinate sentencing was substantially amended within two years of being enacted. In 1977, Assembly Bill 476, the "Boatwright Bill", expanded the set of enhancements and created the stacking of enhancements in some cases.

In 1978, Senate Bill 709 increased the middle and upper terms for "violent" felonies.

Also in 1978, Senate Bill 1057, the "Public Protection Bill", increased the parole supervision period for people serving a determinate sentence to three years, and increased the parole supervision period for people serving a life sentence to five years. As these time periods were often comparable to or longer than the original prison sentence, the parole agency thus gained significant power over someone's state supervision experience, and the potential time that someone on parole could spend back in prison on parole violations was greatly increased.

== Impact ==
=== Anticipated effects ===
While the legislation had bi-partisan support, some criminologists predicted that the goal of more equitable sentencing would be undermined by the enhancement system and increased prosecutorial discretion. Researchers also predicted that sentence lengths would go up over time, because legislators could now respond to public pressure to look "tough on crime" with revisions to the sentencing terms available for particular crimes. Per one state senator interviewed regarding the legislation:

Public attitudes have gotten tougher over the last five years I have been in the Senate and the legislature that has responded to the get-tough view. The people are tired of violent crime and want the legislature to "do something" about it. The legislature doesn't know what to do to solve the crime problem and is frustrated with unsuccessful efforts at rehabilitation. The only thing we can do immediately is raise penalties. Some tough bills get votes now [that] they would not have gotten several years ago.

Per a New York Times article printed on the date the law took effect, "A new state sentencing law took effect today with no one quite sure whether it would, as intended, make the criminal justice system here more equitable and more of a deterrent, or whether it would merely confuse those issues." The article went on to summarize the zeitgeist captured by the law: "The Uniform Determinate Sentencing Act of 1976, as amended in recent weeks, represents an increasing belief among liberals as well as conservatives that rehabilitation in prison rarely works and is difficult, if not impossible, to judge. Similar legislation to eliminate or curb the power of parole boards is being debated in other states and in the United States Senate."

=== Prison population growth ===
Prison commitments per 100,000 people in California immediately rose from 32.4 in 1977 to 39.2 in 1978, which at the time was the highest rate in the history of the California Department of Corrections.

The combination of increasingly long prison sentences and the elimination of parole as an early release mechanism to manage prison populations resulted in an explosion in the prison population over the next two decades. At the end of 1977, 17,338 people were in California prisons. By the end of 1997, 155,276 were in California prisons, a nearly 9x increase.

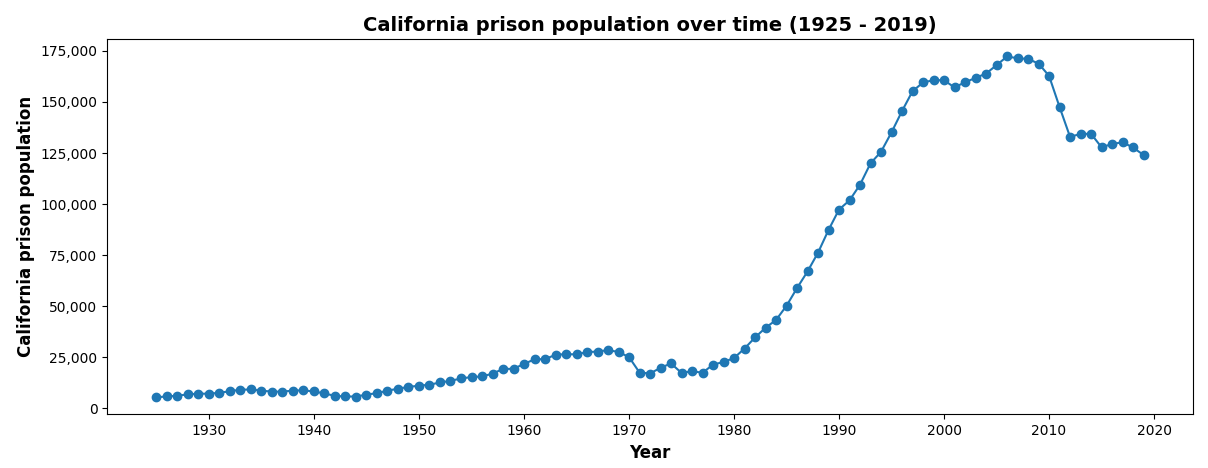
Graph showing the California prison population over time (1925 - 2019)

20 out of the 35 currently operating state prisons were built in response to overcrowding during this window. The California Department of Corrections budget ballooned accordingly, both in absolute terms and as a percentage of the state budget: the $346 million budget in 1977 grew to a $4.4 billion budget by 1997. Despite the capacity increase, the rapid population growth resulted in significant prison overcrowding that culminated in a series of lawsuits the put the state's prison medical care system into receivership and put the state under a court order to reduce prison overcrowding. See Prisons in California#Prison population and overcrowding for further details.

As Judge Steven Z. Perren, a Superior Court Judge for Ventura County, stated during a 1990 hearing on determinate sentencing: "The judges are receiving a mixed message. They're to be more discriminating on who should be sent to prison, yet more laws are passed requiring mandatory incarceration."

=== Recidivism ===
Under the guidance that prison was purely for punishment, the switch to determinate sentences came with decreased spending on rehabilitation. People serving time under a determinate sentence no longer had to demonstrate remorse and accountability to a parole board to be found suitable for parole and had fewer incentives to participate in or benefit from rehabilitative programming.

In 1978, 28% of people on parole returned to prison within 3 years. In 1988, 87% of people on parole returned to prison within 3 years.

In the 1990 hearing on determinate sentencing, T.L. Clannon, M.D., Superintendent at the California Medical Facility, discussed his opinion piece "Rehabilitation Was Working; Determinate Sentencing Results in a Greater Recidivism Rate and Leads to More Victims of Crimes."

In that same hearing, Judge Steven Z. Perren shared: "You got to deal with the drug problem in a realistic way and sending them to prison is not dealing with it in a realistic way. I mean that's the truth of it. You've got to do something else, than lock a drug abuser up."

== Response ==
The California prison system underwent a number of Major court cases and policy changes in the decades after the implementation of the Uniform Determinate Sentencing Act of 1976, in response to rapid prison population growth and significant prison overcrowding.

California Governor Jerry Brown, who signed the act into law during his 1975–1983 period as governor, was re-elected to the California governorship from 2011-2019. During this second tenure, he sought to reduce the prison population and end court oversight of the California prison system, saying "The incentive power of the indeterminate sentence is crucial and something I really didn’t pay attention to back in 1977" and "Sentencing should not be the play toy of ambitious politics [...] It ought to be the judgment of serious minded individuals who are not running for office but have in mind public safety and have in mind the changes men and women can make over time."

Governor Brown sponsored 2016 California Proposition 57, which was approved by 65% of California voters and allowed the parole board to release people convicted of "non-violent" crimes once they served the full sentence for their primary offense. It also required the California Department of Corrections and Rehabilitation to develop uniform parole credits for good behavior and rehabilitative achievements, to incentivize rehabilitation.

== See also ==
- Prisons in California
- List of California state prisons
