= Public Safety Realignment initiative =

California state penal system reform program

California's Public Safety Realignment initiative, officially known as "Realignment," was a combination of two bills passed by the state of California, with the ultimate goal of reducing its state prison population by shifting much of that population to county jails. It was the result of a court-order in response to shortfalls in medical and mental health care for the state's prison population.

On 23 May 2011, the US Supreme Court upheld an order by a three-judge federal court requiring the state of California to reduce its state prison population to no more than 137.5% of its design capacity within two years. Prior to the initiative the state's prison population had risen to roughly 180% of its design capacity, and prisoners had become unable to receive routine medical or mental health care. In response, the governor and the state legislature passed two bills, Assembly Bill 109 and Assembly Bill 117, which became law and went into effect on 1 October 2011. Under these laws, new non-violent, non-serious, and non-sexual offenders with sentences of longer than one year would be housed in county jail facilities rather than state prisons (existing prisoners falling in those categories would not be relocated). Also, inmates released from such facilities would be placed on county-directed supervision rather than state parole. The laws also provided new funding for county facilities for the management of this increased in population.

By 2014 the state had offloaded approximately 25,000 prisoners to county facilities, but was still 9,600 prisoners short of the requirements set by the federal court. The court then granted the state two more years to meet its target prison population. However, the overall inmate population in the state had grown by approximately 12% since the original court order was upheld.

== Before realignment ==
As of 2011, California's state prisons were designed to house approximately 85,000 inmates. At that time, the Prison system housed nearly twice that many, approximately 156,000 inmates. The prison population consisted mainly of men (93%), Latinos and African Americans (roughly 67%), the majority from large urban centers (60% from Los Angeles), and were either unemployed or members of the working poor. Before the 1970s, imprisonment in the United States was rare: only 0.1% of the population was classified as incarcerated on any given day. Forty years later, approximately 1 in every 31 Americans was either in jail/ prison, or on probation/ parole. The financial cost has been estimated at over $60 billion a year for prisons alone, and when factoring in the cost of police and courts the figure has been identified as closer to $215 billion.

== Brown v. Plata ==
In 2011, the US Supreme Court ruled on the case of Brown v. Plata, a case on prison overcrowding. The Supreme Court held in a 5:4 decision that the California Department of Corrections and Rehabilitation had violated inmates' Eighth Amendment rights protecting them from cruel and unusual punishment. The Court upheld a lower court's three-judge panel's order to decrease the population of California's prisons from approximately 156,000 inmates to 110,000 inmates. In addition, they determined that overcrowding was the cause of inmates' inadequate medical and mental health care. As a result, the California Department of Corrections and Rehabilitation had to redistribute inmates and parolees to decrease the overall population to the mandated levels.

== The Public Safety Realignment Act ==
To abide by the federal court's order, California legislature passed Assembly Bill 109 in April 2011. The resulting Public Safety Realignment Act changed how the California state government deals with low level felonies, with the goal of reduced recidivism. Effective October 1, 2011, certain felonies would carry a condition of imprisonment in county jails, as opposed to state prisons. In general, the crimes that qualified for jail sentences, labeled N-3, are non-violent, non-serious, and do not require the accused to register as a sex offender. Parole violations would also be served in local jails. The act also funded post-release community supervision, shifting responsibility for N-3 criminals to the local level. Each county created a Community Corrections Partnership to oversee the implementation of realignment. However, all inmates in state prison at the time the act was made effective would continue to serve their full sentences in prison. The act did not affect the conditions of incarceration. Inmates in county jail were eligible to receive four days of good credit for every two days served, as long as the crime was committed after the act came into effect.

== Changes in prison population ==
According to the Center for Juvenile and Criminal Justice, the first eight months of realignment saw a 41% reduction in new prison admissions and a drop of 28,300 inmates. The parole population was reduced by about half as well. After 15 months, approximately 24,000 inmates that would have served time in state prison were moved to county jails. 14,000 of them were parole violators, and 10,000 were newly sentenced inmates. To accommodate the influx of new inmates, $400 million was provided to the counties in 2011-2012, growing to more than $850 million in 2012-2013 and more than $1 billion in 2013-2014. In April 2013, California Governor Jerry Brown asked for the federal court to rescind its order, citing much improved prison healthcare and a noticeably reduced prison population. The court rejected Gov. Brown's challenge, prompting his declaration in May 2013 that the state would be unable to fully meet the court's order. He instead proposed a series of measures with the goal of being within 2,570 inmates of the required 137.5% maximum capacity, which include sending more inmates to firefighting camp, housing state inmates out of state, medical parole, and leasing private prisons. No changes to sentencing were mentioned.

== Evaluation of California Public safety realignment ==
Some praise realignment as a shift away from California's policy of mass incarceration, such as the three-strikes law. However, many opponents of the law argue that the underlying cause of mass incarceration is unaffected. Californians United for a Responsible Budget (CURB) has stated "The only sustainable way to end overcrowding is to reduce the number of people imprisoned in California." One study showed that more women were released from prison than men, and many of these women had young children.

Professor Peter Nardulli of the University of Illinois frames this in another way: "Rehabilitation no longer seems to be the panacea for crime." A visible effect is that certain county jails are now in danger of overcrowding. Along these lines, CURB has suggested decriminalizing drug possession, reducing sentences for youth, and preventing excessive sentences. As an alternative, Professor Schuck of Yale University has proposed deportation of inmates who are present illegally in the US, writing "Early deportation of immigrant criminals would confer immense benefits on federal and state taxpayers (and on the remaining prisoners) at little or no marginal costs."

== See also ==
Prisons in California

Incarceration in California

California Conservation Camp Program
