= The Prison in Twelve Landscapes =

- Directed by: Brett Story
- Written by: Brett Story
- Produced by: Brett Story
- Cinematography: Maya Bankovic
- Edited by: Avril Jacobson
- Music by: Olivier Alary
- Production company: Oh Ratface Films
- Release date: March 2016 (True/False)
- Running time: 90 minutes
- Country: Canada
- Language: English

The Prison in Twelve Landscapes is a Canadian documentary film, directed by Brett Story and released in 2016. The film explores the social impact of the prison–industrial complex in the United States through twelve vignettes, each consisting of different settings that portray how the system has affected them. Ranging from incarcerated women fighting wildfires, to strategically placed pocket parks, to the civil unrest in Detroit in 1967, the film demonstrates the vast impact the mass incarceration dilemma in the United States has had across the country.

The film premiered at the True/False Film Festival in March 2016, and had its Canadian premiere at the Hot Docs Canadian International Documentary Festival in May.

== Synopsis ==
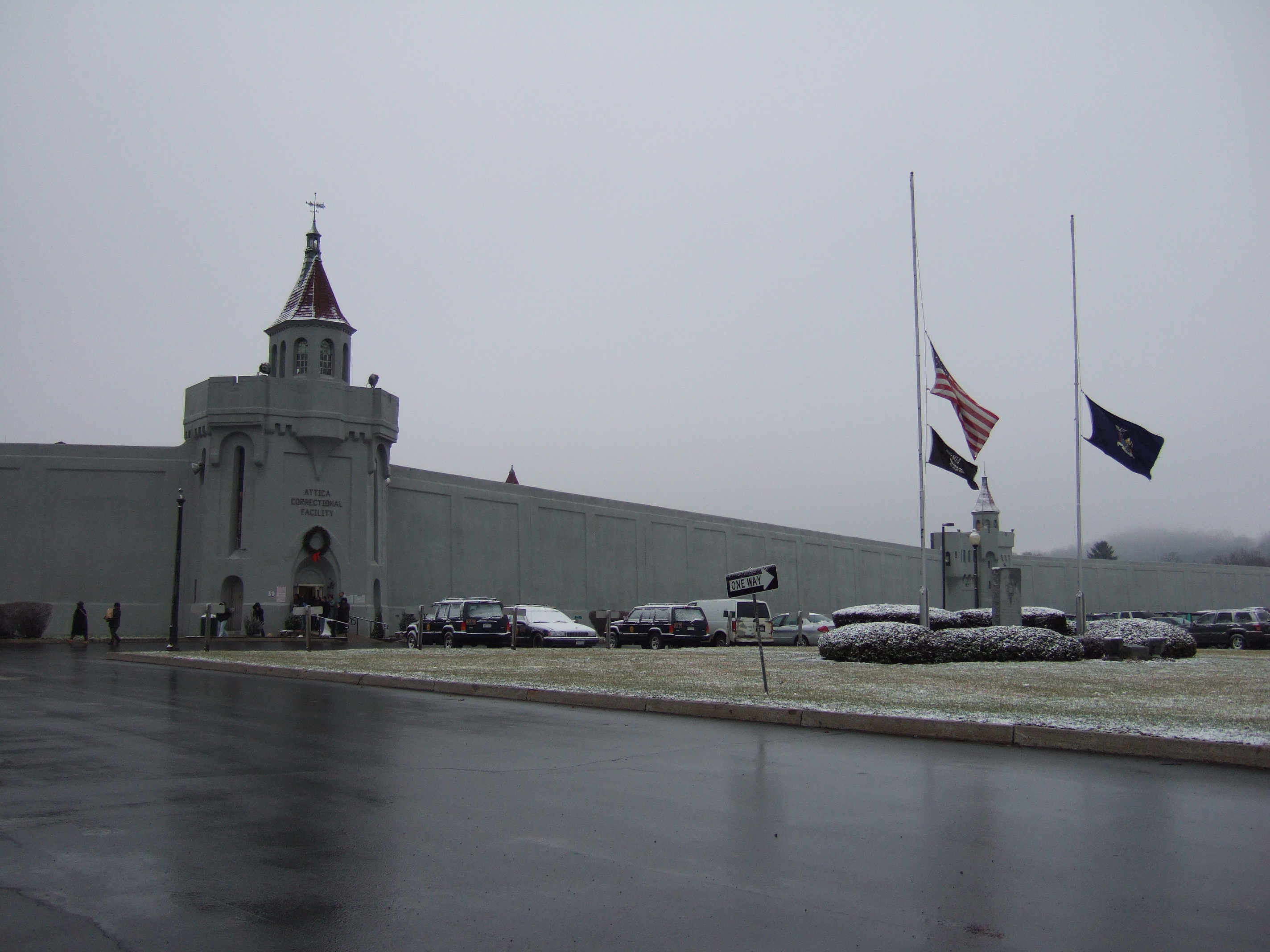
Attica Correctional Facility

=== New York City to Attica Prison – Opening Scene ===
The documentary opens with a bus ride going from New York City to Attica Correctional Facility, displaying restless children and adults who are on a long journey to see loved ones. In the background there are voice messages being played which are meant to be coming from families outside of the prison system who are sending them to their familiars who are incarcerated. The scene frames the rest of the documentary by demonstrating the way the prison system is tethered to other people and institutions other than the individual directly involved.

=== Washington Square Park – Chess Player ===
The film transitions to Washington Square Park where there is a formerly incarcerated black man playing chess. The chess player goes into his backstory and explains the things he went through to end up where he is. The scene focuses on the individual and examines the way incarceration reconfigured the man's life trajectory and role in society.

=== Eastern Kentucky – Economic Reliance ===
Eastern Kentucky is used in the documentary to reveal the economic reliance communities and small towns have on prisons and other institutions. Small towns such as Wheelwright, Kentucky, have a small economy that is strongly dependent on bigger corporations to provide jobs. The town was established around the Elkorn Coal Company who found coal reserves in the area. Once the area was depleted of resources, the company fled and disrupted the economic state through the amount of jobs lost. With the opening of the Southeast State Correctional Complex, residents are forced to rely on the prison for employment.

=== Detroit, Michigan ===
This section of the film is a unique vignette that appears twice in the documentary juxtaposed to each other. In its first appearance it shows the redevelopment Detroit has had through investments, disinvestments, and policing in response to the past urban unrest by showing Detroit's revitalized financial district.

Detroit, Michigan makes its second appearance as the 8th vignette as well presented in the film, taking place in 1967. Through the usage of clips and videography from 1967 Detroit, Michigan, Brett Story references the civil unrest during the War on Crime era during President Lyndon B. Johnson's and Richard Nixon's administration. This vignette promotes the historical context that links how political responses and societal reactions counteracted and influenced each other that fed into the mass incarceration dilemma in the United States.

=== Marin County, California – Firefighting ===
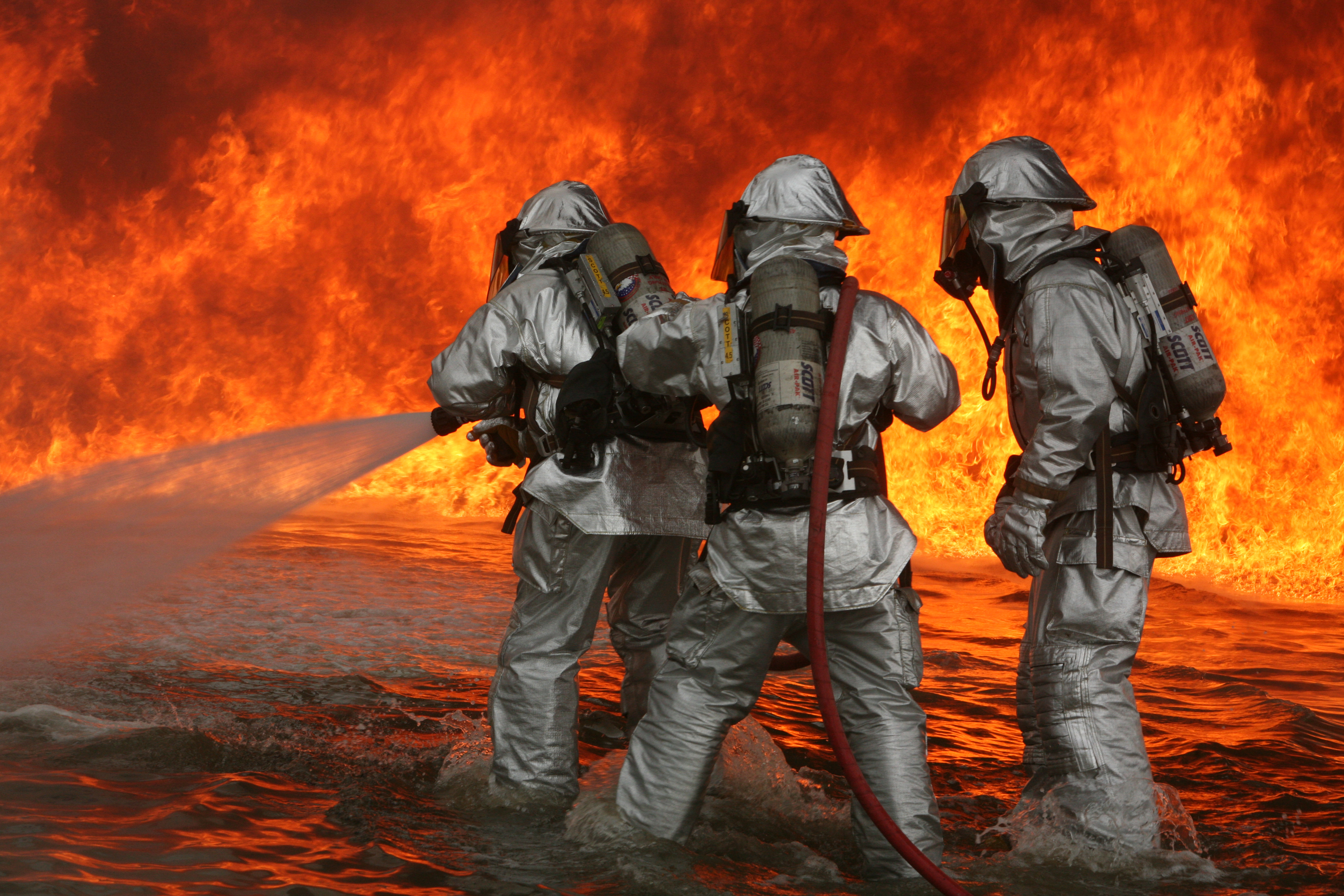
California Fires

The film pans over to the California fires with a narrator describing what women go through during the process of becoming an incarcerated firefighter. She describes the necessity of fire camps and firefighters in California, along with the risks and the little compensation they get in return. The documentary uses this vignette to expose the use of prison labor and to reveal the exploitation built into the carceral economy.

=== Bronx, New York – Care Packages ===
Transitioning over to a warehouse that is run by a formerly incarcerated man, the film reveals a small industry meant specifically for prisoners and their families. Care package facilities is a type of market for families to send approved items and goods for their incarcerated familiars, such as food, snacks, music, and more. This scene begins to reveal some of the extra costs families have to spend to be able to make sure their familiars are taken care of while incarcerated.

=== Los Angeles, California – Pocket Parks ===
This vignette focuses on the strategically placed parks that are being formed throughout the city of Los Angeles, specifically built to deter sex offenders and others who appear on the list of registration for sex offenders.

=== St. Louis County, Missouri – Micro-punishments ===
St. Louis County is used in the documentary to show the way minor municipal infractions affect residents in impoverished communities. By calling to attention the policing and small sanctioning within states, the film conveys how the bureaucratic mechanisms of cities and towns disproportionately target people of color to accumulate revenue. Stories from residents who have been affected highlight the injustices and extra expenses they have to deal with.

=== Baltimore, Illinois – Burdens of Incarceration ===
This section uniquely displays the burdens that incarceration has on family members and others outside in the community through the use of messages and songs left through radio stations, and with the demonstration of protests and societal beliefs people have.

=== Manhattan, New York – The Overlooked ===
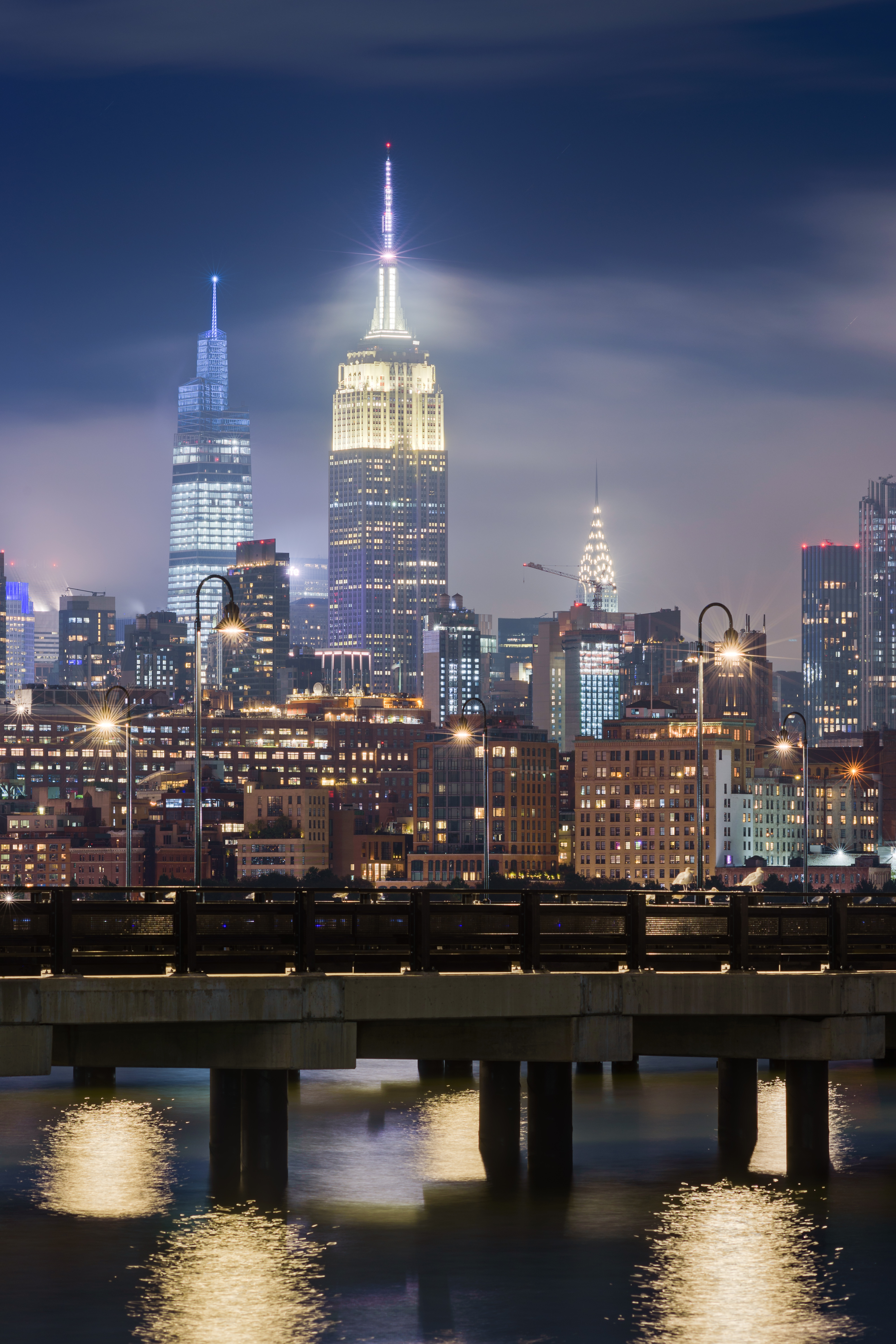
Midtown Manhattan

The transition from Baltimore to Manhattan exposes more of the permeable burdens that fall to those affected by the carceral system outside of the prison complex. The documentary shows a conversation between two women which shows their perspective of the prison industrial complex and highlights how the system revolves around capital.

=== Attica, New York – Closing Scene ===
The documentary closes off with a view of driving to Upstate New York and ending things off with the camera panning to the doors of Attica Correctional Facility.

== Production ==
The production team consists of Brett Story as the director and producer who is an independent writer and non-fiction filmmaker, along with Lori Chodos, who was the associate producer in the documentary. The editor was Avrïl Jacobson who is a Toronto-based editor that has screened many festivals such as Sundance Film Festival, the International Documentary Festival of Amsterdam and the Toronto International Film Festival. The sound design and recordist was done by Simon Gervais, who works at Bande a part Audio as a sound designer, and Ian Reynold, who is a Hamilton-based sound recordist. The composer is a French native named Olivier Alary who is a Montreal-based musician and composer.

=== Director insights ===
The filmmaker, Brett Story, started off with no general direction for the documentary but with intentions of making a film revolving around the prison system. Story began her filmmaking during her graduate studies in the University of Toronto, while obtaining her PhD in geography. The film itself was created with the sense to uniquely depict the genres and social sciences of mass incarceration through a unique paradigm of 12 vignettes, or 12 settings and viewpoints. Just how Toronto-based researcher and author Shiri Pasternak explained, the film shows how “it’s the kind of violence that shows up in uneven life choices, in the distribution of resources that leave some hungry and poor, some more vulnerable to discrimination and physical harm." Story has similarly said in many interviews how her goal is to reframe how people view prison and to suggest that “prison constitutes a broader system” that takes place in ordinary places all around the nation.

== Reception ==
=== Critical reception ===
The Prison in Twelve Landscapes holds an 88% approval rating on review aggregator website Rotten Tomatoes, based on 8 reviews, with a weighted average of 7.8/10. On Metacritic, the film holds a rating of 86 out of 100, based on 5 critics, indicating "universal acclaim".

=== Awards ===
At Hot Docs, the film was awarded a $5,000 Special Jury Citation in the Best Canadian Feature Documentary category. It was the winner of the Colin Low Award for best Canadian documentary at the 2016 DOXA Documentary Film Festival.

At the Vancouver Film Critics Circle Awards 2016, the film won the award for Best Canadian Documentary.

The film received a Canadian Screen Award nomination at the 5th Canadian Screen Awards in 2017, for Best Feature Length Documentary.
