= 2016 California Proposition 57 =

Prison reform proposition

Proposition 57
- Criminal Sentences & Juvenile Crime Proceedings

Results
Choice	Votes	%
Yes	8,790,723	64.46%
No	4,847,354	35.54%
Valid votes	13,638,077	93.34%
Invalid or blank votes	972,432	6.66%
Total votes	14,610,509	100.00%
Registered voters/turnout	19,411,771	75.27%
County results
Yes
80–90%
70–80%
60–70%
50–60%
No
60–70%
50–60%

Proposition 57 was an initiated California ballot proposition, approved on the November 8, 2016 ballot. The proposition allows parole consideration for nonviolent felons, changes policies on juvenile prosecution, and authorizes sentence credits for rehabilitation, good behavior, and education.

== The proposition ==
Due to the approval of the proposition, the California Department of Corrections and Rehabilitation will begin to implement these new parole and sentencing provisions. The passage and implementation of the proposition may allow the state to save tens of millions of dollars each year.

Proposition 57 allows the parole board to release nonviolent prisoners once they have served the full sentence for their primary criminal offense. Previously, prisoners were often required to serve extra time by a sentence enhancement, such as those for repeated offenders. In addition, Proposition 57 requires the Department of Corrections to develop uniform parole credits, which reward prisoners' good behavior with reduced sentences.

This proposition allows juvenile court judges to determine whether or not juveniles aged fourteen and older should be prosecuted and sentenced as an adult, repealing California Proposition 21, which was passed in March 2000. Proposition 21 gave prosecutors the sole authority to decide whether to try a young offender as a juvenile or adult.

Proposition 57's proponents sought to restore juvenile court judges’ authority over juvenile offenders. The California Department of Corrections and Rehabilitation has been under federal court supervision since the Supreme Court of the United States found that California's prison overcrowding constitutes cruel and unusual punishment (Brown v. Plata, 2011).

== Proponents ==
Proponents of the measure spent $11.75 million. The top contribution was $4.14 million raised by Governor Brown. Other proponents responsible for significant contributions included the California Democratic Party, Tom Steyer, Reed Hastings, and the Open Philanthropy Project. The measure was also supported by the editorial boards of the Los Angeles Times, the San Francisco Chronicle, and The Sacramento Bee.

== Opponents ==
Opponents of the proposition argued that it would release potentially dangerous criminals due to improper classification of crimes as non-violent including domestic violence and child molestation.

Opponents of the proposition spent $641,326 fighting against the measure. Opponents that made high contributions included Los Angeles County police unions and a prosecutor lobbying group.

== Result ==
Proposition 57 was approved by voters in the November General Election, with 64.46% voting in favor.

In 2024, CA SB 268 changed state law to include the rape of a drugged victim in the list of violent felonies, thereby excluding these felons from Proposition 57. The bill was enacted three weeks after the parole of Andrew Luster.
