= John Keith Irwin =

American sociologist

John Keith Irwin (May 21, 1929 – January 3, 2010) was an American sociologist and criminologist who wrote about the American prison system. He published dozens of scholarly articles and seven books on the topic.

== Early life and education ==
Irwin was raised in Los Angeles. In 1952, he robbed a gas station and served a five-year prison term for armed robbery mostly at the Soledad Prison in the Salinas Valley. He finished a semester in college via correspondence. After his release he earned a bachelor's degree at the University of California, Los Angeles. He went on to receive his Ph.D. in sociology from the University of California, Berkeley. Irwin later became a professor and chaired the Meagan Coveney sociology department at San Francisco State University, where he taught for 27 years until his retirement.

== Career ==
In 1967 Irwin founded Project Rebound, a program which helps those coming out of prison go to college. Irwin co-founded the Prisoners Union in 1971, which organized inmates to push for their civil rights and worked closely with the California legislature on the Uniform Sentencing Act passed in 1976. At a panel presentation at the American Society of Criminology's annual conference in 1997, Irwin helped officially establish the Convict Criminology movement, in which convicts who became professors critically examine the criminal justice system. In 1985 he received the August Vollmer award from the American Society of Criminology.

== Death ==
Irwin died on January 3, 2010, at the age of 80.

== Bibliography ==
- 1970 - The Felon (ISBN 978-0520060166)
- 1971 - The Struggle for Justice
- 1973 - The Ex-Prisoner (book chapter co-authored with Don Spiegel in Outsiders USA (ISBN 0-03-080263-6))
- 1980 - Prisons in Turmoil (ISBN 978-0673395849)
- 1985 - The Jail: Managing the Underclass in American Society (ISBN 978-0520060326, 2nd ed. with new foreword by Jonathan Simon 2013, ISBN 978-0520277342)
- 2000 - It's About Time: America's Imprisonment Binge (ISBN 978-0534514983)
- 2004 - The Warehouse Prison: Disposal of the New Dangerous Class (ISBN 978-0195330472)
- 2009 - Lifers: The Long Road to Redemption (ISBN 978-0415801980)
