= Brown v. Plata =

- Supreme Court of the United States

Argued November 30, 2010 Decided May 23, 2011
- Full case name: Edmund G. Brown, Jr., Governor of California, et al., Appellants v. Marciano Plata, et al.
- Docket no.: 09-1233
- Citations: 563 U.S. 493 (more) 131 S. Ct. 1910; 179 L. Ed. 2d 969; 2011 U.S. LEXIS 4012
- Opinion announcement: Opinion announcement

Case history
- Prior: Judgment for complainant sub nom. Coleman v. Wilson, 912 F. Supp. 1282 (E.D. Cal. 1995); judgment for complainant sub nom. Plata v. Brown, 3:01-cv-01351-TEH (N.D. Cal. 2009).
- Subsequent: Application for stay denied, 570 U.S. 938 (2013).

Holding
- A court-mandated population limit was necessary to remedy a violation of prisoners' Eighth Amendment constitutional rights.

Court membership
- Chief Justice John Roberts Associate Justices Antonin Scalia · Anthony Kennedy; Clarence Thomas · Ruth Bader Ginsburg; Stephen Breyer · Samuel Alito; Sonia Sotomayor · Elena Kagan

Case opinions
- Majority: Kennedy, joined by Ginsburg, Breyer, Sotomayor, Kagan
- Dissent: Scalia, joined by Thomas
- Dissent: Alito, joined by Roberts

Laws applied
- U.S. Const. amends. VIII, XIV; Rehabilitation Act of 1973, Prison Litigation Reform Act, Americans With Disabilities Act

Brown v. Plata, 563 U.S. 493 (2011), was a decision by the Supreme Court of the United States holding that a court-mandated population limit was necessary to remedy a violation of prisoners’ Eighth Amendment constitutional rights. Justice Kennedy filed the majority opinion of the 5 to 4 decision, affirming a decision by a three judge panel of the United States District Court for the Eastern and Northern Districts of California which had ordered California to reduce its prison population to 137.5% of design capacity within two years.

Justice Scalia filed a dissent that was joined by Justice Thomas. A separate dissent was filed by Justice Alito that was joined by Chief Justice Roberts.

== History ==
=== Coleman v. Brown ===
Coleman v. Brown (Previously Coleman v. Wilson) (E.D. Cal.), is a federal class action civil rights lawsuit under the Civil Rights Act of 1871, Eighth and Fourteenth Amendment to the United States Constitution, and the Rehabilitation Act of 1973 alleging unconstitutional mental health care by the California Department of Corrections and Rehabilitation (CDCR).

The case was filed on April 23, 1990, and tried before a United States magistrate judge. In June 1994 the magistrate judge found that defendants’ delivery of mental health care to class members violated the Eighth Amendment to the United States Constitution.

On September 13, 1995, the court upheld the magistrate judge's factual findings regarding mental health care screening, insufficient number of staff, incompetence of staff, delays in access to care, medication management and involuntary medication. The court also issued a permanent injunction and ordered that a special master be appointed to monitor compliance with the court-ordered injunctive relief. The special master submitted 16 interim reports, with later reports "reflect[ing] a troubling reversal in the progress of the remedial efforts of the preceding decade".

=== Plata v. Brown ===
Plata v. Brown (N.D. Cal.), is a federal class action civil rights lawsuit alleging that the California Department of Corrections and Rehabilitation's (CDCR) medical services are inadequate and violate the Eighth Amendment, the Americans with Disabilities Act, and section 504 of the Rehabilitation Act of 1973.

The case was filed on April 5, 2001, and re-filed with an amended complaint on August 20, 2001. The plaintiffs claimed a number of deficiencies related to inadequate medical care including, but not limited to: inadequate medical screening of incoming prisoners; delays in or failure to provide access to medical care; untimely responses to medical emergencies; the interference of custodial staff with the provision of medical care; insufficient numbers of competent medical staff; incomplete medical records; a "lack of quality control procedures,"; a lack of protocols to deal with chronic illnesses; and the failure of the administrative grievance system to provide timely or adequate responses to complaints concerning medical care. The claims alleged that patients being treated by the CDCR received inadequate medical care that resulted in the deaths of 34 inmates.

The plaintiffs and defendants negotiated a stipulation for injunctive relief, which the court approved by court order on June 13, 2002, requiring defendants to provide "only the minimum level of medical care required under the Eighth Amendment."

However, three years after approving the stipulation as an order of the court, the court conducted an evidentiary hearing that revealed the continued existence of appalling conditions arising from defendants’ failure to provide adequate medical care to California inmates. As a result, the court ruled in June 2005 and issued an order on October 3, 2005, putting the CDCR's medical health care delivery system in receivership. The receivership became effect in April 2006.

=== Plata v. Brown/Coleman v. Brown three-judge court ===
In 2006, the plaintiffs in the Coleman and Plata cases filed motions to convene a three-judge court to limit the prison population. 18 U.S.C. § 3626, a statute created by the Violent Crime Control and Law Enforcement Act and further amended by the Prison Litigation Reform Act, requires that any orders for the reduction of prisoner population be issued by a court consisting of three district judges. On October 4, 2006, Governor Schwarzenegger issued Proclamation 4278, declaring a state of emergency with regard to the prisons. During the pending motions, the Little Hoover Commission released its report titled "Solving California's Corrections Crisis: Time Is Running Out" and the CDCR Expert Panel on Adult Offender Recidivism Reduction Programming released its report, both advocating a reduction in prison overcrowding. On July 23, 2007, both the Plata and Coleman courts granted the plaintiff's motions and recommended that the cases be assigned to the same three-judge court. The Chief Judge of the United States Court of Appeals for the Ninth Circuit agreed and, on July 26, 2007, convened the instant three-judge district court pursuant to 28 U.S.C. § 2284.

The Three-Judge Court initially consisted of Judge Thelton Henderson, Judge Lawrence Karlton, and Judge Stephen Reinhardt. Judge Karlton passed away and then Judge Kimberly Mueller joined the Three-Judge Court on September 1, 2014. On August 14, 2017 Judge Jon Tigar took the place of Judge Henderson. After Judge Reinhardt's death, Judge Kim Wardlaw took his place on April 4, 2018.

=== Release order ===
On August 4, 2009, the three-judge court ordered that the defendants submit a plan within 45 days detailing "a population reduction plan that will in no more than two years reduce the population of the CDCR's adult institutions to 137.5% of their combined design capacity." The decarceration plan would require California to cut 40,000 inmates out of its prison population of 150,000 when the verdict was issued. In an order described by The New York Times as "scathing", the panel indicated that the state had failed to follow through on previous orders to improve conditions and that the cuts were needed to deal with overcrowding and poor health care that was causing an unnecessary death each week on average. The panel recommended achieving the cuts by reducing imprisonment of nonviolent offenders and technical parole violators.

The state submitted a plan on September 18, 2009, but the plan failed to meet requirements set by the release order. On October 21, 2009, the court rejected the plan, and gave the government until November 12 to submit a corrected plan or it would order the attorneys for the plaintiffs to submit a plan and order it implemented. The state submitted a revised plan on November 12, 2009, and the plan was accepted and entered as an order of the court on January 12, 2010.

== United States Supreme Court Decision ==
California appealed the order to the Supreme Court on January 19, 2010, and the Court postponed jurisdictional questions relating to the appeal on June 14, 2010. It was argued on November 30, 2010.

=== Opinion of the Court ===
A five justice majority of the Court affirmed the prisoner release order. Sacramento native Justice Anthony Kennedy wrote for the Court, first chronicling the troubled 11 years California prisons operated near 200% of design capacity. Kennedy then offers a parade of horribles, including that 54 prisoners may share a single toilet, suicidal prisoners have been locked for nearly 24 hours in telephone booth sized cages, and that a preventable death occurs once every five to six days. Because "prisoners retain the essence of human dignity inherent in all persons", the courts have a responsibility to remedy violations of the Eighth Amendment's prohibition against cruel and unusual punishment.

Kennedy notes that the Prison Litigation Reform Act of 1996 (PLRA) only allows a three-judge court to order a limit on prison population. A three-judge court can only be convened after less intrusive orders have failed and the State has been given a reasonable time to comply with prior orders. Because over 12 years have passed since the initial Coleman order, Kennedy rejects California's argument that it has not been given reasonable time to comply. Kennedy likewise finds less intrusive orders have failed because over 70 orders have already been issued and the Plata Receiver had stated that a solution other than reducing overcrowding would "all but bankrupt the State of California".

The PLRA's requirement that crowding is the primary cause of the violation is met because, according to Kennedy, deference should be given to the three-judge court's findings. Adequate staffing is unfeasible because prisons had a 54% vacancy rate for psychiatrists and they already "would hire any doctor who had ‘a license, a pulse and a pair of shoes’." This quote was taken directly from Dr. Ronald Shansky (the patriarch of correctional healthcare) in his testimony against the California Department of Corrections and Rehabilitation.Kennedy then catalogs the many ways overcrowding causes problems, noting that orderly trial management requires some deadline to discovery, and that the PLRA merely requires overcrowding to be the primary, not the only, cause of the constitutional violation.

Kennedy rejects California's argument that out of state prison transfers are an available alternative relief to prisoner reductions because out of state transfers are a prisoner reduction under the PLRA. Furthermore, Kennedy rejects the availability of alternative solutions because "California's Legislature has not been willing or able to allocate the resources necessary to meet this crisis".

The PLRA requires prospective relief to be narrowly drawn, extend no further than is necessary to correct the violation, and be the least intrusive means of correcting the violation. The "positive effect" of releasing healthy prisoners who are not members of the class actions is still narrowly tailored because, according to Kennedy, the scope of the remedy must be proportional to the scope of the violation. Placing a population limit on the entire state prison system instead of the plaintiffs’ prisons is less intrusive because it allows the State flexibility to shift prisoners between prisons. Additionally, Kennedy writes that the prisoner release order is not overbroad because the State will be allowed to ask the three-judge court to modify the order, someday.

Kennedy finds the three-judge court met the PLRA requirement that substantial weight must be given to public safety. The "difficult predictive judgments" prospective relief requires means that courts "can and should" rely on expert testimony. Noting that there were nearly 10 days of trial on the public safety issue, Kennedy agrees with the three-judge court that releasing criminals from prison "could even improve public safety" because the prisons are making people worse.

Finally, Kennedy finds the three-judge court did not err with establishing the two-year deadline. While the two-year deadline may not be feasible, Kennedy notes that California has already made progress in reducing overcrowding and that it asked the court to reverse, not extend, the order. As such, Kennedy feels that the three-judge court should give "serious consideration" to any future requests to extend the deadline.

=== Dissents ===
==== Justice Scalia's oral dissent ====
Justice Antonin Scalia disagreed with the Court majority so strongly that he spent over nine minutes after the Opinion Announcement reading his dissent from the bench. Scalia believes that "the only viable claims are those by prisoners who have themselves been denied needed medical treatment. Since the classes certified here are improper, it follows the remedy decreed is also illegal."

==== Justice Scalia's written dissent ====
In his written dissent Scalia, joined by Justice Clarence Thomas, elaborates that a constitutionally inadequate prison hospital system cannot authorize the District Court to release healthy prisoners. Because only prisoners who have already been denied medical care have a legal claim, and only those prisoners meet the "bedrock rule" that all class action members' claims are individually viable, the courts cannot "most generously reward" any healthy prisoners. Scalia thinks it is absurd that "fine physical specimens who have developed intimidating muscles pumping iron in the prison gym" will be ordered released to alleviate prison hospital crowding.

Scalia further rejects the "theory of systemic unconstitutionality". Since judges' factfinding is traditionally for past or present facts, Scalia thinks it is proper only for elected policy officials to make "broad empirical predictions". Because this "structural injunction" made such predictions about the future, Scalia writes "the policy preferences of three District Judges now govern the operation of California's penal system."

While Scalia acknowledges that the PLRA explicitly contemplates prospective prisoner release orders, he feels that this reading of the statute should be construed so as to not "veer significantly from the historical role" of the courts.

Scalia also feels "the Court's respect for state sovereignty has vanished in the case where it most matters." Accusing the majority of affirming "the functional equivalent of 46,000 writs of habeas corpus, based on its paean to courts", Scalia ridicules the 9th Circuit for having its habeas relief reversed four times that Term alone, three of which involved Judge Reinhardt.

Finally, Scalia castigates Kennedy for what he calls the "bizarre coda" emphasizing that the order can be modified latter. Lampooning Kennedy for stating the obvious, Scalia speculates that the majority is attempting to rein in some headstrong judges and that "a warning, if successful, would achieve the benefit of a marginal reduction in the inevitable murders, robberies, and rapes to be committed by the released inmates. But it would achieve that at the expense of intellectual bankruptcy".

==== Justice Alito dissents ====
Justice Samuel Alito, joined by Chief Justice John Roberts, dissented separately. Alito believes that the prison capacity ratio imposed by the three-judge court would order "the premature release of approximately 46,000 criminals-the equivalent of three Army divisions."

As such, Alito first objects that "with the safety of the people of California in the balance the record on this issue should not have been closed." Because "prospective relief must be tailored to present and future, not past, conditions" Alito feels the court needed to extend its factfinding beyond when it closed discovery.

Second, Alito rejects that the prisoner relief order extends no further than is necessary. He notes that California could have simply released some of the class action plaintiffs, that is, the medically and mentally ill prisoners. It "exemplifies what went wrong in this case", for Alito, that the judge rejecting this solution responded he would not "say yes, and the hell with everybody else."

Finally, Alito does not believe the three-judge court met the PLRA requirement to give substantial weight to any adverse impact on public safety. Reciting crime statistics from Philadelphia from the 1990s, Alito deduces that released criminals will commit crimes. Alito warns "I fear that today's decision, like prior prisoner release orders, will lead to a grim roster of victims."

== Implications of Brown v. Plata ==
=== Shifting prison populations ===
Instead of solely releasing state prison inmates, California simply began moving them to places where they would not be counted.

In the months leading up to the decision, California began mass-exporting incarcerated people instead of releasing them. More than 10,000 incarcerated people were sent to other states under the auspices of the Interstate Corrections Compact. This accounted for 25% of the court-mandated prison-population downsizing and 6% of the state's overall prison population.

After the case was argued but before the court issued its opinion, the California legislature passed the 2011 Public Safety Realignment initiative, or AB 109. State officials felt it was inefficient that the state was subject to a 46,000 prisoner reduction order while the county jails contained 10,000 empty beds. As such, the legislation restructured California's penal system mostly by shifting prison inmates, which are subject to the court order and an expense to the state, to county jails, which are not subject to the court order and are an expense of the counties. Almost 500 felonies were redefined by the legislature so that they could only be served in county jail and the state provided that "non-non-nons", that is non-serious, non-violent, and non-sexual offenders, will always serve their time in county jail.

From 2010 to 2012 California's prison population was reduced by 18% while its jail population increased by 12%. Additionally, the state run probation system dropped by 46% while the county run parole population increased by 34%. All told, prison realignment resulted in the largest drop in California's prisoner population since the 34% of inmates population between 1969 and 1976.

=== Population reduction ===
California met the initial court imposed benchmarks. The state released a white paper on "The Future of California Corrections" known as "The Blueprint" which planned on seeking the kind of order modification Justice Kennedy had anticipated. Governor Jerry Brown then announced that the prison crisis had been resolved, terminated his emergency powers, and asked to modify the court order. The three-judge court refused any modification, threatening to hold the governor in contempt of court. Judge Reinhardt even appended to his opinion a table of state laws, including appropriation limits, that were now "waived" so that the governor could obey his order.

California applied for a stay of the order from the Supreme Court. The Supreme Court denied the stay without comment. However, Justice Alito would have granted the stay and Justice Scalia even wrote a dissent, joined by Justice Thomas. Scalia largely quotes his dissent to the Court's earlier opinion, noting that he had correctly predicted that the three-judge court would be unwilling to modify its order.

Nevertheless, California failed to meet the three-judge court's deadline and needed to be granted another extension until February 2016. The California electorate further reduced defined felonies by passing California Proposition 47 (2014).

The state must still submit monthly updates to the Three Judge Court regarding population reduction and other efforts to implement the decision. As of the last update on May 9, 2018, the prison population was at 134.7% of its design capacity. 114,618 inmates are in in-state institutions, while 3,553 inmates are in out-of-state facilities as of May 9, 2018. The final update of 2017 reported 114,813 inmates in state institutions, with 4,315 in out of state facilities.

=== Cost reduction ===
In the first few years after the decision, California prison costs declined. Governor Brown framed efforts to implement Brown v. Plata as a way to decrease costs. While the prison budget initially declined after the decision, the prison budget then increased beginning in 2013.

Some state officials maintain that costs have increased because of medical care enhancements (including a new medical facility and additional funding for medication) ordered by Brown v. Plata. However, others maintain that cost increases are due to increased spending on personnel. The state changed how they calculate the appropriate number of personnel. Previously, the state would hire one new prison guard per six new inmates; now, the state staffs each prison based on their size and layout.

=== Mental health care improvements ===
Implementation of mental health care facilities improvements are still ongoing. The Program Guide, which is the remedial implementation plan for Coleman v. Brown, mandated the following: "1) Any inmate referred to a Mental Health Crisis Bed must be transferred within 24 hours of referral; 2) Any inmate referred to any acute inpatient mental health placement be transferred within ten days of referral, if accepted by Department of State Hospitals; 3) Any inmate referred to any intermediate health care placement be transferred within 30 days of referral, if accepted by the Department of State Hospitals." On April 19, 2017, Judge Kimberly Mueller held that the state was not in compliance with the Program Guide timelines for transfers to mental health care facilities. Judge Mueller ruled that if the state was not in compliance by May 15, 2017, she would enforce her order with civil contempt proceedings or monetary sanctions.

On February 21, 2018, the state appealed this order to the Ninth Circuit, claiming that the District Court "abused its discretion because perfect compliance with the Program Guide is not relief that is necessary to correct a systemic Eighth Amendment violation" and that if "the April 19 Order also mandated perfect compliance with the 24-Hour MHCB transfer timeline, then such a ruling also fails to comport with the Eighth Amendment and PLRA." The plaintiffs/appellees filed their reply brief on May 25, 2018.

=== Subsequent cases ===
Brown v. Plata has faced mixed treatment in the courts.

- Peyton v. Brown (C.D. Cal.), which held: "Plata's remedial decree did not create a substantive right in an individual to bring a civil rights action seeking release." The court cited Preiser v. Rodriguez, which held: "[W]hen a state prisoner is challenging the very fact or duration of his physical imprisonment, and the relief he seeks is a determination that he is entitled to immediate release or a speedier release from that imprisonment, his sole federal remedy is a writ of habeas corpus."
- Thomas v. Alameda County (N.D. Cal) further discussed whether Brown v. Plata created a substantive right. There, the plaintiff was in custody before trial and in his complaint relied on Brown v. Plata to make a prison overcrowding claim. The court stated that Brown v. Plata "by itself does not provide any substantive right on which plaintiff can rely, and his claim of general prison overcrowding based on Plata fails."
- Peralta v. Dillard (9th Cir.), also defined Brown v. Plata. There, an inmate sued California's state medical officer, dental officer and staff dentist under §1983. The court referenced Brown v. Plata because it showed the following: 1) prisoners cannot sue states for money damages, but can sue them for injunctions; 2) "even for prisoners not yet injured by constitutionally deficient conditions, history counsels skepticism about the utility of injunctive relief."

=== Public opinion ===
According to a national poll of registered voters taken by Fairleigh Dickinson University's PublicMind in the spring of 2011, just 25% of voters agreed that prisoners would need to be let go if prisons were badly overcrowded and prisoners’ health conditions were poor, while 63% said, "even though conditions are bad, the court cannot order criminals to be released." Dr. Peter J. Woolley, Director of PublicMind added, "It's no surprise that the public holds its own interests in much higher regard than health and safety of prisoners or even prison guards".

Nevertheless, important differences emerged among various segments of the population: men were more sympathetic than women to prisoner release. One in five women (19%) agreed that some prisoners should be released, compared to a third of men (32%). In addition, voters under the age of 30 split on the question of release (42%-43%), while older voters were against allowing courts to order prisoner release by a margin of 2-to-1 or more. In terms of ideology, 74% of conservatives were against the idea of court-ordered releases compared to the 48% of liberals. Finally, white voters by 3-to-1 said the courts should not order prisoner releases to remedy overcrowding and health problems, while black voters split on the question, 50%-41%.

Responding to the poll, Bruce Peabody, professor of political science at Fairleigh Dickinson University said the Court's ruling was "somewhat surprising." He added "While our current Supreme Court has a mixed record with respect to recognizing various rights of those accused of crimes, it has generally declined to give extensive constitutional protections to those already behind bars… the Court has gone against the wishes of eighteen states who asked for more deference on the issue, and [as a result] it has extended rights to a group – prisoners – who have historically not received much judicial protection."

=== Selected scholarship ===
A number of legal academic studies and articles have focused on this case, both in the years before the Supreme Court decision and in the years since the Supreme Court decision. Below is a list of selected scholarship.

- Anastasia Cooper, The Ongoing Correctional Chaos in Criminalizing Mental Illness: The Realignment's Effects on California Jails, 24 Hasting's Women's L.J. 339 (2013).
- Bethany L. Edmondson, Trans-Lating the Eighth Amendment Standard: The First Circuit's Denial of a Transgender Prisoner's Constitutional Right to Medical Treatment, 51 Ga. L. Rev. 585 (2017).
- Laura Rovner, On Litigating Constitutional Challenges to the Federal Supermax: Improving Conditions and Shining a Light, 95 Denv. L. Rev. 457 (2018).
- Margo Schlanger, Civil Rights Injunctions Over Time: A Case Study of Jail and Prison Court Orders, 81 N.YU. L. Rev. 550 (2006).
- Margo Schlanger, Plata v. Brown and Realignment: Jails, Prisons, Courts and Politics, 48 Harv. C.R.-C.L.L. Rev. 165 (2013).
- Fredrick E. Vars, Shelby B. Calambokidis, From Hospitals to Prisons: A New Explanation, 102 Cornell L.Rev. Online 101 (2017).

== See also ==
- Plata v. Schwarzenegger
- Coleman v. Schwarzenegger
- List of United States Supreme Court cases, volume 563
- Eighth Amendment
- Public Safety Realignment Initiative
