= Incarcerated firefighters =

Use of incarcerated people to fight fires

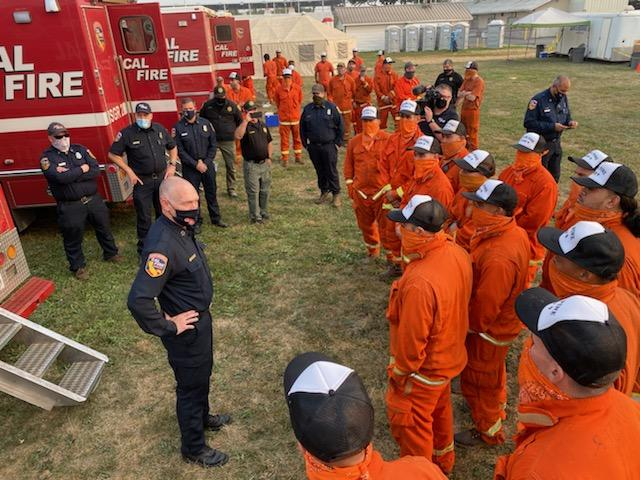
Thom Porter visits SugarPine Crew 6, an incarcerated firefighting crew, and fire captains at the North Complex

Incarcerated firefighters are individuals who fight natural disasters and fires predominantly in the Western United States. Incarcerated firefighters have been fighting fires since before World War II. In recent years, the program has faced criticism due to low pay and the nature of the job. Firefighting is one form of rehabilitation available to the incarcerated population. The need for firefighters has increased due to climate change, which has subsequently increased the need for and use of incarcerated firefighters.

== Use of incarcerated firefighters ==
California, Florida, Colorado, Montana, Wyoming, Oregon, and Washington are among the states that use incarcerated people to fight wildfires. In California, fire camps are run by California's Department of Corrections and Rehabilitation (CDCR), and the California Department of Forestry and Fire Protection (CAL FIRE). CDCR states that their goal is to support local, state, and federal agencies in responding to natural disasters. 30-40% of all of California's firefighters are incarcerated.

== Fire camps ==
Incarcerated firefighters stay at "fire camps" when they aren't actively fighting a big fire, and many describe fire camp as being much better than prison. One reason some volunteer is the ability to remove oneself from behind prison walls. Inmates are allowed access to certain privileges in fire camps like TV's, video games, and real weights. For example, items pre-approved by correctional officers such as hard copies of video games can be sent to fire camps. The food at fire camps are also described to be better than inside prisons. Camps lack the electrified fences and high levels of security found in prisons. Racial tensions within fire camps are reported to be better than they are in prisons, for they are out in nature.There are also many other reasons more than the ones above. There are even picnics on weekends.

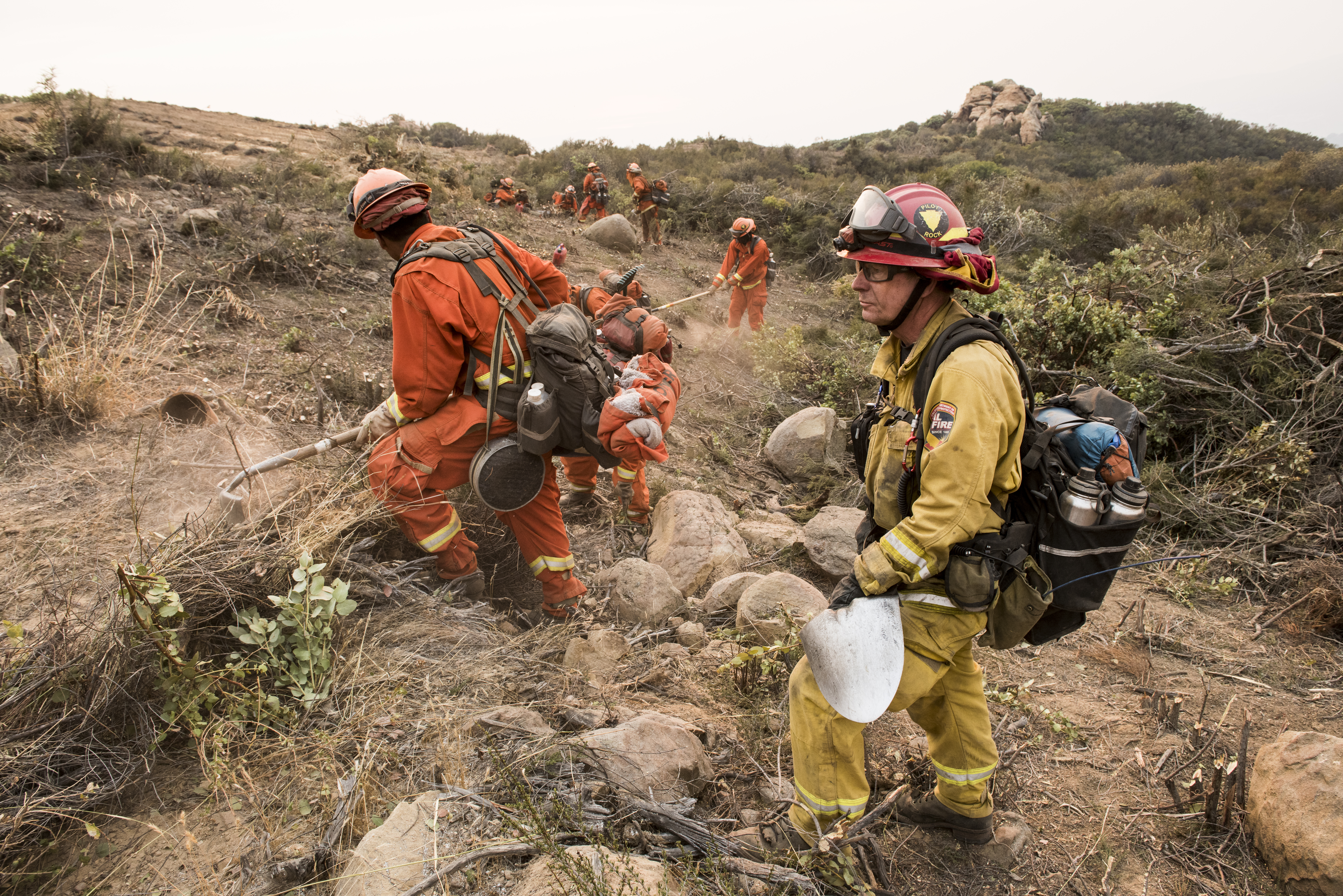
Incarcerated firefighters clear a fire line at the Thomas Fire near Santa Barbara, California on Dec 11, 2017.

== Life on the front lines ==
Incarcerated firefighters go where the bulldozers and helicopters can't go. This includes using techniques that prevent fires from spreading. They are typically assigned tasks that are more mundane and "dirty". During the 2025 California Fire, some worked 24 hours on the fire line and then had 24 hours off/rest. During their 24 hours on the job, they sleep on the mountains. During the 2025 California Fire, some didn't have access to a shower for 4 – 7 days. Work off the front lines of an active wildfire can consist of manual labor for local, county, and state agencies such as maintaining parks, highways, public golf courses, and preventing floods.

== Benefits of the program ==
California voters passed Proposition 57 in 2016 that allowed inmates to get time off their sentences for their participation in fire camps. Incarcerated firefighters earn two days off their sentence for every day they are actively fighting a fire, and those charged with a violent offense earn one day off their sentence for every two days of work. Many describe the experience as rewarding and say it helps them feel a sense of purpose. They enjoy being seen as heroes by the public instead of being seen as "criminals", and enjoy doing a public service. Additionally, fire camps are considered a rehabilitative space for incarcerated people.

In addition to the benefits that the inmates working on the front lines may experience, states also benefit from using inmates to help fight fires. For example, California saves $100 million a year by employing inmates to fight fires. The U.S. Forest Service has struggled with staffing, partially due to low wages, so incarcerated firefighters have filled in those gaps.

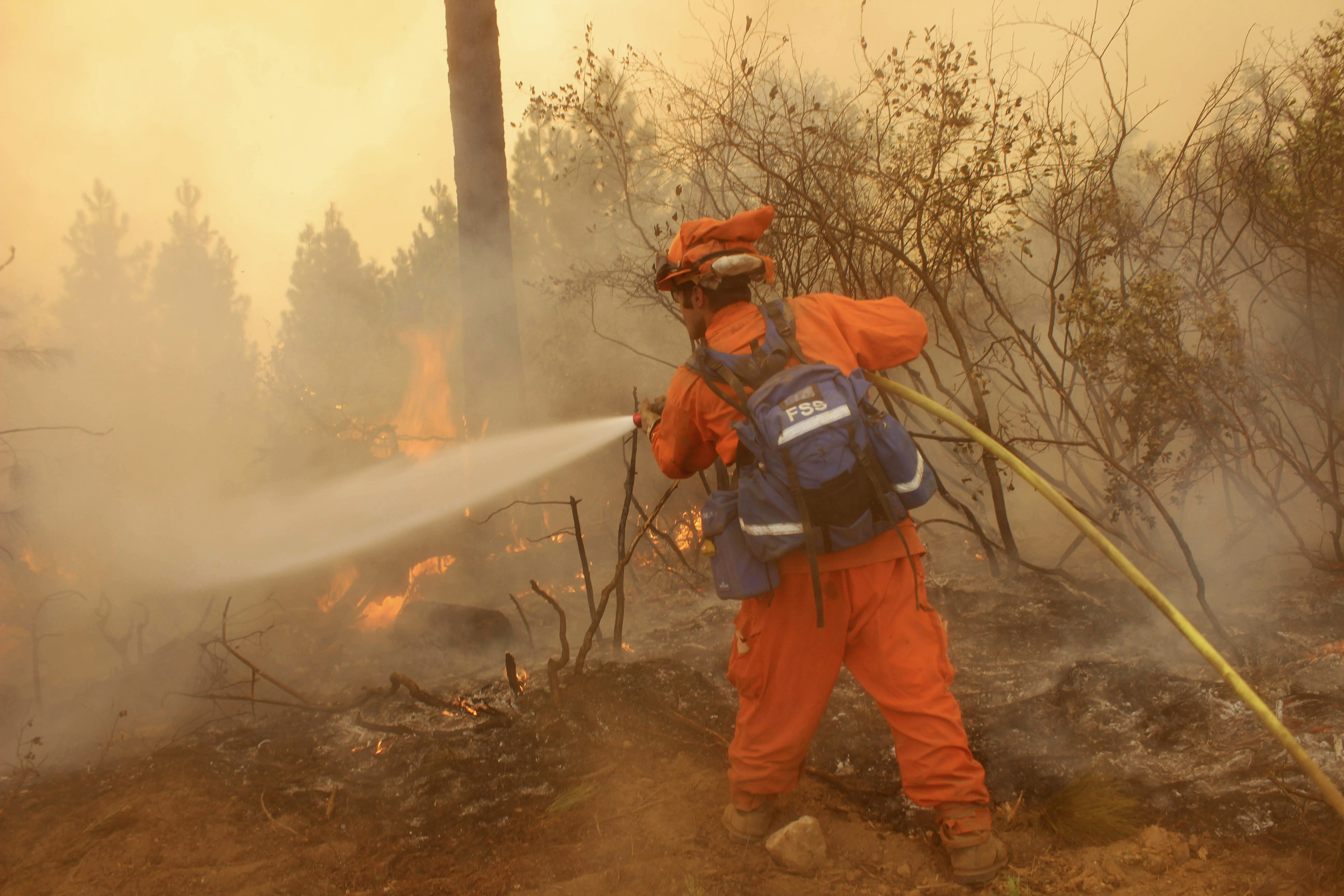
Incarcerated firefighters spray down a hotspot at the Rim Fire in the Stanislaus National Forest in California.

== Criticism ==
Some incarcerated firefighters have stated that their training, which is two weeks of physical training and two weeks of fire specific training, doesn't adequately prepare them to fight fires. Full-time California firefighters training is a three-year apprenticeship program. Additionally, 42% of incarcerated firefighters state the work they do is dangerous, and hard. Many discuss that after release, there are minimal opportunities when it comes to jobs, even when one has been trained in firefighting. To be eligible to work for many areas of CAL Fire one needs an EMT license which one can't obtain with a felony on their record. California has passed AB 2147 to expunge felony records for incarcerated firefighters. Additionally, inmates volunteer to participate in the program. However, the choice to be a firefighter while incarcerated can be seen as not truly voluntary because fire camp conditions are seen as much better in contrast with prison.

Incarcerated individuals are more likely to be injured and commonly get substandard medical care. Current occupational health and safety regulations protect non-incarcerated firefighters more than they protect incarcerated ones. Additionally, incarcerated firefighters don't have the same access to workers' compensation as non-incarcerated firefighters do. Incarcerated youth firefighters do not have restrictions on the amount of time they can work compared to non-incarcerated youth workers.

== See also ==
- Penal labor in the United States
