= California Conservation Camp Program =

California inmate disaster response program

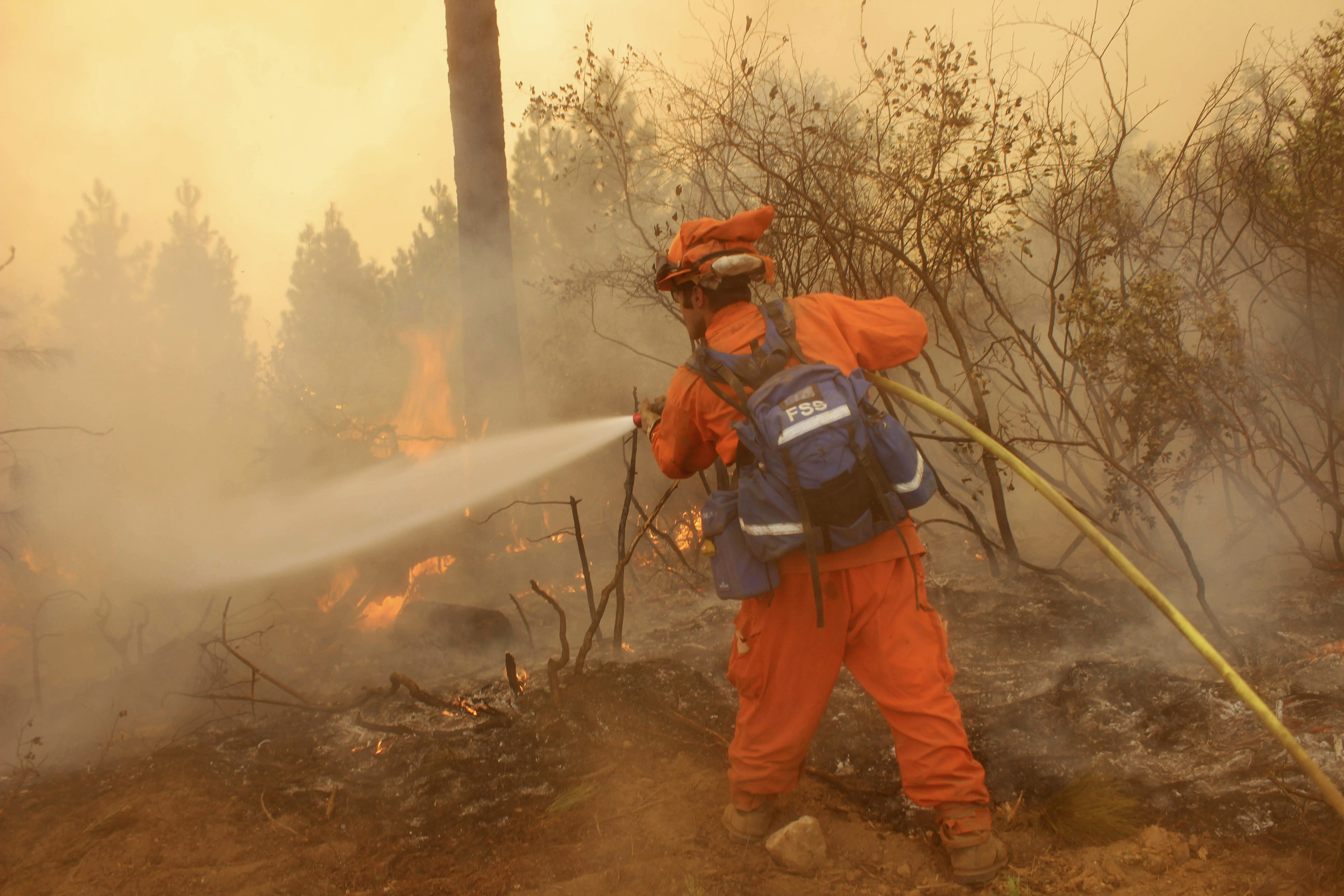
Incarcerated firefighters fight the Rim Fire in California in 2013

The California Department of Corrections and Rehabilitation (CDCR) runs 44 conservation camps (also called fire camps) jointly with the California Department of Forestry and Fire Protection (CAL FIRE) and the Los Angeles County Fire Department. The mission of the Conservation Camp program is to "support state, local and federal government agencies as they respond to emergencies such as fires, floods, and other natural or manmade disasters." Over 3,000 incarcerated people work at the conservation camps each year, including men, women, and juveniles, all of whom have volunteered for the program. All volunteers receive the same entry-level training as CAL FIRE's seasonal firefighters.

CAL FIRE reported 3,500 incarcerated firefighters in its 2018–19 staffing numbers, making incarcerated firefighters approximately 27% of the total firefighting capacity of the state.

== History ==
Conservation camps are an evolution of "road camps" staffed by incarcerated people, first formally authorized by the California state legislature in 1915 to build roads and railroads, respond to environmental issues, and participate in some types of agriculture. In response to firefighter labor shortages during World War II, the Rainbow Conservation Camp was established as the first permanent fire camp, in 1946. It was modeled after New Deal Civilian Conservation Corps camps.

The program grew to 16 camps throughout California in the 40s and 50s, including the first youth camps. In 1959, California Senate Bill 516 authorized expansion of the program, motivated by the comparatively cheap cost of housing and paying incarcerated laborer for firefighting and environmental programs, the belief that the program was effective at rehabilitation, and a desire to reduce overcrowding inside prisons. Between 1959 and 1966, the program grew to 42 camps staffed by 2,880 incarcerated people, or 8.7% of the prison population at that time.

Camp funding and therefore staffing declined under the Governorship of Ronald Reagan from 1967 to 1975, before a resurgence in the 1980s emphasizing cost savings rather than rehabilitation. The first conservation camp for women was opened in 1983 with the conversion of the Rainbow Conservation Camp from a men's camp to a women's camp. Per a 1990 pamphlet published by the CDCR, "As they repay their debt to society, camp inmates also provide a real economic benefit to local communities. In 1989 alone, camp inmates worked 5.5 million hours—a $43 million value".

Per a CDCR news report, as of 2007 "Approximately 200 crews log an average of more than three million person hours a year fighting wildfires and responding to floods, earthquakes, and search and rescue missions. [...] When not responding to emergencies, crews put in an additional seven million hours every year working on conservation projects on public lands and community service projects. Fire crews clean up campgrounds, beaches and parks on city, county and state land and provide the labor for weed abatement and other projects that help reduce the risk of fires and other disasters." The report also stated that use of incarcerated labor in Conservation Camps save the state more than $80 million annually.

== Camp operations ==
=== Selection criteria ===
There are several criteria that an incarcerated person must meet in order to be eligible for the program. All inmates must be declared both physically and mentally able to serve in the program by CDCR health staff. Volunteers can only have a maximum of 8 years remaining on their sentence at the time of selection. Additionally, all volunteers are required to have "minimum custody status", meaning that they have the lowest security classification. This classification is determined based on past behavior in prison, ability to follow rules, and their previous participation in rehabilitation programs.

There are certain criteria that automatically deems someone as ineligible for volunteering. These include convictions of rape or other sexual offenses, arson, and a record of prior escape. Additionally, any inmate with an active warrant or involvement with a high-profile case may also be disqualified from participation.

== Staffing ==
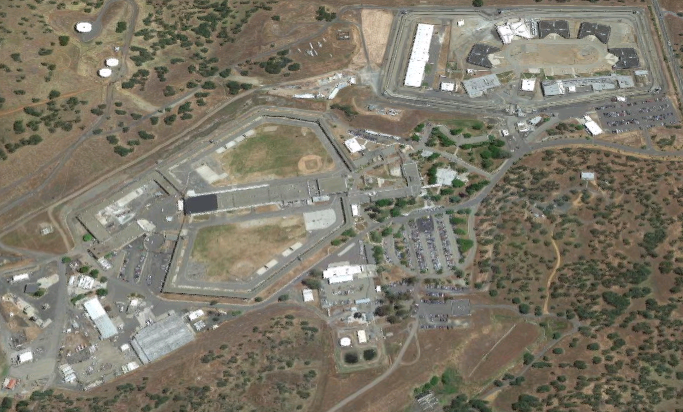
Aerial view of Sierra Conservation Center, a California prison and one of the major training facilities for incarcerated firefighters

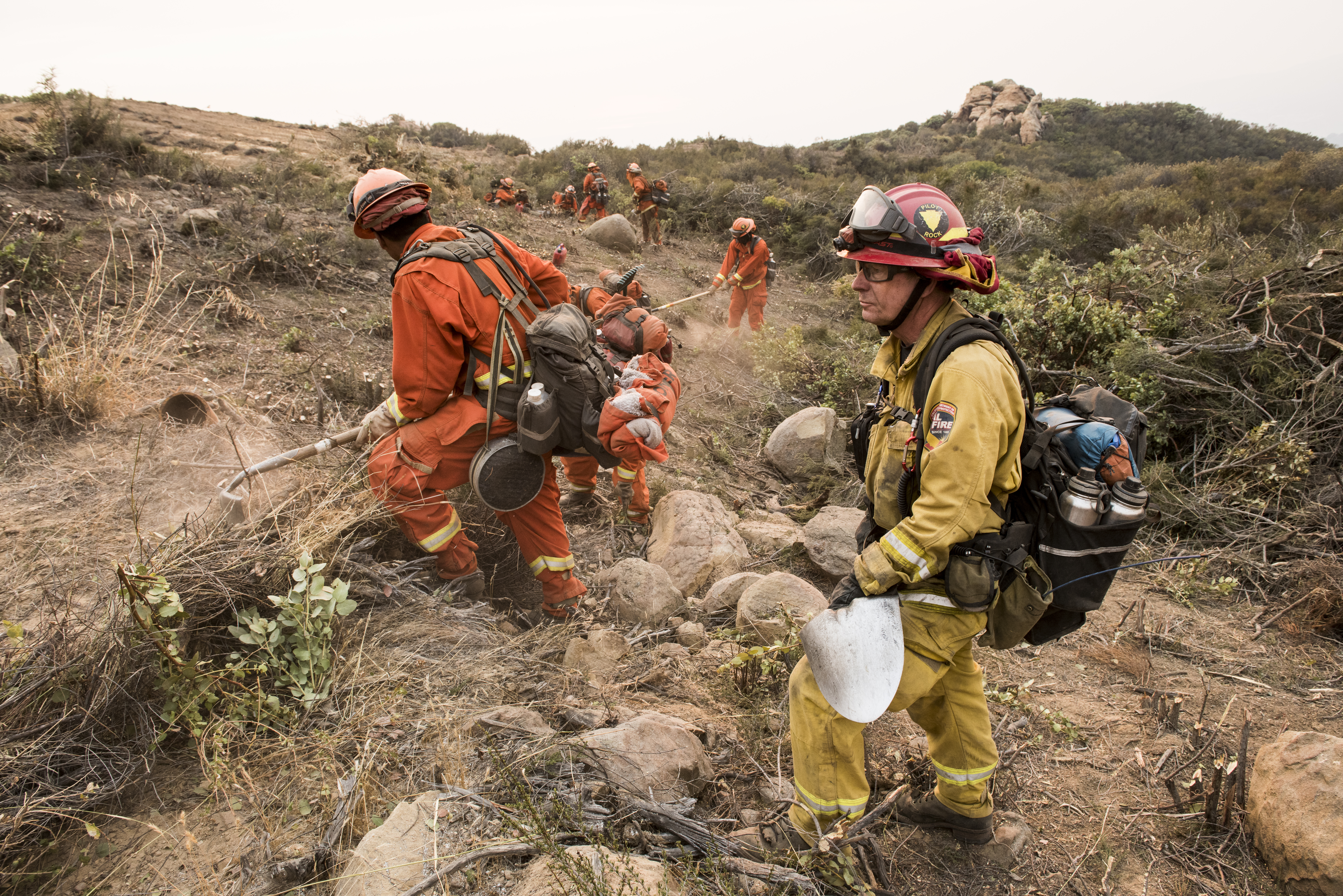
Incarcerated firefighters clear a fire line near Santa Barbara, California in December 2017

Today, approximately 3,100 incarcerated people live and work out of 44 camps run by the California Department of Corrections and Rehabilitation in conjunction with either CAL FIRE or the Los Angeles County Fire Department. Camps are structured as open dormitories, with dining and maintenance activities staffed by incarcerated people and supervised by correctional staff. The two active camps for women are Malibu Conservation Camp and Puerta la Cruz. Most youth camps have been converted to camps for adult men, with one remaining youth camp at Pine Grove.

Work varies by camp but often includes:

- Fire prevention (fuel reduction)
- Fire suppression
- Cemetery maintenance
- Conservation projects
- Fence building
- Flood control
- Manufacturing of signs and plaques
- Museum construction and maintenance
- Production and maintenance of firefighter gear
- School grounds maintenance
- Search and rescue
- Trail maintenance
- Vegetation removal
- Lumber processing and woodworking

Programs vary by camp but often include:

- Alcoholics Anonymous and Narcotics Anonymous
- GED and college correspondence courses
- Faith-based services
- Hobby crafts
- Visitation

Mobile Fire Kitchen Units, deployed to feed responders and displaced community members in emergencies like fires and earthquakes, are primarily staffed by incarcerated workers from conservation camps.

== Contributions to firefighting ==
=== 2018 fire season ===
During the 2018 fire season, The Camp Fire and Woolsey Fires ravaged the state, burning around 240,000 total acres. Approximately 1,500 of the 9,400 firefighters who worked to contain these blazes hailed from the conservation camp program. At this time, it was estimated that inmates from the program served more than 3 million hours of emergency response time for the state. Additionally, officials estimated that the system saves California upwards of $90 million per year in labor.

=== 2020 fire season ===
During the 2020 wildfire season, wildfires burned over 4.2 million acres across the state. Due to the COVID-19 pandemic, many inmates were sent home in order to slow the spread of the virus. This measure contributed to the extreme shortage of firefighters that the state dealt with in the face of rapidly spreading fire complexes.

=== 2025 Los Angeles fires ===
During the 2025 Los Angeles fires, over 1000 inmates assisted in battling multiple blazes.

== Conservation camps in the news ==
Conservation camps received increased public scrutiny in the late 2000s after a series of damaging fires in the state, with concerns about the safety of incarcerated firefighters, their compensation, and their inability to become firefighters upon release. Two incarcerated firefighters at Bautista Conservation Camp died in a 1990 fire, and many crew members were injured. Three incarcerated firefighters died on the job in 2017 and 2018. In response to one media inquiry about conditions and pay, a CDCR spokesperson stated that firefighters earn $2.90 - $5.12 per day, with an additional $1 per hour when assigned to an active emergency.

Citing a San Francisco Chronicle article about a bill to remove restrictions on formerly incarcerated firefighters becoming career firefighters upon release, 2020 presidential candidate Julian Castro tweeted "In California, incarcerated people are risking their lives battling wildfires for $1/hour. Yet these same people are barred from firefighting after release. It's wrong. If you can save lives serving a sentence, you can save lives when you're released." The bill did not pass.

In 2025, conservation camps came under new scrutiny due to their role in staffing inmates to fight the 2025 Los Angeles fires. Celebrity and influencer Kim Kardashian took to social media to express her disappointment at the fact that inmate firefighters only make an additional $1 per hour when responding to active emergencies. She thanked the first responders who were responding to the fires, and urged Governor Gavin Newsom to raise the pay that incarcerated firefighters receive.

== Legislation and reforms ==
In September 2020, Governor Gavin Newsom signed Assembly Bill 2147, which allows inmate firefighters to petition courts to dismiss their convictions after completing their sentences. This would provide a path for former prisoners to obtain EMT certification on release, a frequent requirement for hiring or advancement as a firefighter. To be considered for expungement, an inmate must have participated in a conservation camp as a firefighter. Those who were removed from the camp for negative behavior are ineligible, as are people who worked in camps but did not serve as firefighters.

In April 2024, the CDCR approved an amendment that doubled the amount that those staffed in conservation camps could earn per day. Rather than earning between $2.90 and $5.12 per day, incarcerated firefighters could now earn between $5.80 and $10.24 per day. The additional $1 per hour for active emergencies remained unchanged.

In 2025, Gavin Newsom signed a state budget that allocated $10 million for paying incarcerated firefighters the minimum wage of $7.25 per hour. This policy change reflects both an increase in pay and a shift towards paying those who serve in fire camps, who often work 24 hour days during emergencies, by the hour. The bill received bipartisan support from lawmakers, and will go into effect on January 1, 2026 as long as the state legislature approves its mandate.

== Similar programs ==
There are 14 other states - Arizona, Colorado, Georgia, Idaho, Montana, Nevada, New Mexico, North Carolina, Oregon, South Dakota, Tennessee, Virginia, Washington, and Wyoming - in the U.S that use incarcerated people to fight fires. These programs have similar entry criteria and systems as California's, although the California Conservation Camp System is the largest and most widely recognized.

In addition to state program, the US federal government also runs incarcerated firefighting programs. These programs primarily serve to fight fires in dry, wildfire prone Western states such as California and Oregon.

A study done by Texas A&M University showed that 30 states that utilized incarcerated labor in their emergency response plans. Many of those states, such as Texas and Arkansas, do not currently have programs for incarcerated firefighters.

== In popular culture ==
Fire Country is an American drama television series in which a young convict volunteers for the Conservation Camp Program.

== See also ==
- Prisons in California
- Incarceration in California
- Penal labor in the United States
