= Parole board =

Panel deciding on the conditional release of a prisoner

A parole board is a panel of people who decide whether an offender should be released from prison on parole after serving at least a minimum portion of their sentence as prescribed by the sentencing judge. Parole boards are used in many jurisdictions, including the United Kingdom, the United States, and New Zealand. A related concept is the board of pardons and paroles, which may deal with pardons and commutations as well as paroles.

A parole board consists of people qualified to make judgements about the suitability of a prisoner for return to free society. Members may be judges, psychiatrists, or criminologists, although some jurisdictions do not have written qualifications for parole board members and allow community members to serve as them. A universal requirement is that board candidates be of good moral fiber.

== United Kingdom ==
In the United Kingdom parole board members are also drawn from a wider circle of professions. The boards typically make a judgement about whether a prisoner will affect public safety if released, but do not form an opinion about whether the initial sentencing was appropriate. The boards are non-departmental public bodies respectively of the UK government (Parole Board for England and Wales), the Scottish Government (Parole Board for Scotland), and the Northern Ireland Executive (Parole Commissioners for Northern Ireland).

== United States ==
There are 52 parole boards in operation in the United States. Some states require all members to possess a four year degree, while others do not. Additionally, some states require at least one member to be an ex-convict, and some require corrections experience, but there are no nation-wide parole board qualifications. Each state has a different requirement for parole board appointment.

On the federal level, there is no longer parole except for certain military and foreign crimes. The United States Federal Sentencing Guidelines (enacted in 1987) discontinued parole for those convicted of federal crimes for offenses committed after November 1, 1987. Instead of parole the legislation provided that judges may specify as part of sentencing, a period of supervised release to be served after the prison sentence. Prisoners may also receive time off their sentences for "good behavior". However, this truth in sentencing legislation also requires federal prisoners to serve at least 85 percent of their sentences. The United States Parole Commission remains the parole board for those who committed a federal offense before November 1, 1987, as well as those who committed a District of Columbia Code offense before August 5, 2000, a Uniform Code of Military Justice offense and are parole-eligible, and persons who are serving prison terms imposed by foreign countries and have been transferred to the United States to serve their sentence.

Every U.S. state also has a parole board. The autonomy of the board from the state governor also varies; in some states the boards are more powerful than in others. In some states the board is an independent agency while in others it is a body of the department of corrections. In 44 states, the parole members are chosen by the governor. Parole boards throughout the states often act on the governor's influence and reportedly feel the need to do so to ensure job security. However, fourteen states have eliminated or severely restricted access to parole, turning instead to "determinate sentencing" which specifies the exact length of sentence, subject still, in most cases, to time off the sentence for good behaviour.

Nine states in the United States have boards of pardons and paroles that exclusively grants all state pardons. Alabama (Board of Pardons and Paroles), Arizona (Board of Executive Clemency) Connecticut (Board of Pardons and Paroles), Georgia (Board of Pardons and Paroles), Idaho (Commission of Pardons and Paroles), Minnesota (Board of Pardons), Nebraska (Board of Pardons), Nevada (Board of Pardon commissioners, South Carolina (Board of Probation, Parole and Pardon), and Utah (Board of Pardons and Paroles) are the states in the United States with such boards. (Arizona's Board of Executive Clemency conducts parole hearings only for inmates who have committed offenses prior to January 1994, parole having been abolished by statute in 1993).

Mississippi's state constitution includes a unique provision that any inmate seeking a pardon from that state's governor must, at least thirty days before making the request, publish a legal notice of their request for a pardon in a newspaper located in or near the county where the inmate seeking the pardon was convicted and sentenced. In addition Mississippi courts have held that a pardon when given does not erase the criminal record.

Determinate sentencing has also severely reduced the power of many parole boards. Often, consideration of the opinion of the victim or victims or their family is taken into account in the board's final determination (see victims' rights). Compared to the states still using indeterminate sentencing and relying more heavily on parole, those using determinate sentencing contributed less to the higher incarceration rates from 1980-2009.

Parole boards have often been looked at as a contributor towards mass incarceration and as an area needing great reform. Significant research has not yet been made into the interconnection of parole and other sectors such as media and politics, but many call for a separation between the sectors and a sweeping de-politicization of the appointment process. Additionally, many have looked towards increasing qualifications for parole board members to be comparable with those of judges. Alongside the heightening of standards, a general call of an increase in comprehensive training, transparency, and accountability of parole boards has been widely called for, as many current parole board members have never set foot in a prison, and an increase of training often results in a rise of fair and just hearings.
