= Prison overcrowding =

Prison overcrowding is a social phenomenon occurring when the demand for space in a prison exceeds the capacity for prisoners.

== By country ==
=== Egypt ===
Amnesty International reported on 25 January 2021 the abuse of prisoners in Egypt not only by physical/mental torture, cruelty, or inhumanity but also by overcrowding of the prison cells with the arrested activists and rights defenders, despite the COVID-19 pandemic. According to the concerned Amnesty spokesperson, Philip Luther, the Egyptian prison authorities showed no regard to the wellbeing or lives of the prisoners and crammed them all into the country's already overcrowded prisons, ignoring their health requirements. According to the report “What do I care if you die? Negligence and denial of health care in the Egyptian prisons”, despite overcrowding, the prisoners received no medication or toiletries from the prison authorities and had to rely on their visiting family members for the same.
