= Rehabilitation Act of 1973 =

United States law

- Long title: An Act to replace the Vocational Rehabilitation Act, to extend and revise the authorization of grants to States for vocational rehabilitation services, with special emphasis on services to those with the most severe disabilities, to expand special Federal responsibilities and research and training programs with respect to individuals with disabilities, to establish special responsibilities in the Secretary of Health, Education, and Welfare for coordination of all programs with respect to individuals with disabilities within the Department of Health, Education, and Welfare, and for other purposes.
- Nicknames: Rehab Act
- Enacted by: the 93rd United States Congress
- Effective: September 26, 1973

Citations
- Public law: Pub. L. 93-112
- Statutes at Large: 87 Stat. 355

Codification
- Acts amended: Vocational Rehabilitation Act
- Titles amended: 29
- U.S.C. sections created: 29 U.S.C. § 701 et seq.
- U.S.C. sections amended: 31-41c

Legislative history
- Introduced in the House as H.R. 8070 by John Brademas (D–IN) on May 23, 1973; Committee consideration by House Committee on Education and Labor; Passed the House on June 5, 1973 (384-13); Passed the Senate on July 18, 1973; Reported by the joint conference committee on July 24, 1973; agreed to by the House on September 13, 1973 (400-0) and by the Senate on September 18, 1973 (88-0); Signed into law by President Richard Nixon on September 26, 1973

Major amendments
- Civil Rights Restoration Act of 1987; No Child Left Behind Act

United States Supreme Court cases
- New York City Transit Authority v. Beazer, 440 U.S. 568 (1979); Southeastern Community College v. Davis, 442 U.S. 397 (1979); University of Texas v. Camenisch, 451 U.S. 390 (1981); Community Television of Southern Cal. v. Gottfried, 459 U.S. 498 (1983); Consolidated Rail Corporation v. Darrone, 465 U.S. 624 (1984); Irving Independent School Dist. v. Tatro, 468 U.S. 883 (1984); Smith v. Robinson, 468 U.S. 992 (1984); Alexander v. Choate, 469 U.S. 287 (1985); Honig v. Students of Cal. School for Blind, 471 U.S. 148 (1985); Atascadero State Hospital v. Scanlon, 473 U.S. 234 (1985); County of Los Angeles v. Kling, 474 U.S. 936 (1985); Bowen v. American Hospital Assn., 476 U.S. 610 (1986); Department of Transportation v. Paralyzed Veterans of America, 477 U.S. 597 (1986); School Bd. of Nassau Cty. v. Arline, 480 U.S. 273 (1987); Traynor v. Turnage, 485 U.S. 535 (1988); Lane v. Pena, 518 U.S. 187 (1996); Barnes v. Gorman, 536 U.S. 181 (2002); Fry v. Napoleon Community Schools, No. 15-497, 580 U.S. ___ (2017); Cummings v. Premier Rehab Keller, P.L.L.C., No. 20-219, 596 U.S. ___ (2022)

The Rehabilitation Act of 1973 (Pub. L. 93–112, 87 Stat. 355, enacted September 26, 1973) is a United States federal law, codified at 29 U.S.C. § 701 et seq. The principal sponsor of the bill was Rep. John Brademas (D-IN-3). The Rehabilitation Act of 1973 replaces preexisting laws (collectively referred to as the Vocational Rehabilitation Act) to extend and revise the authorization of grants to States for vocational rehabilitation services, with special emphasis on services to those with the most severe disabilities, to expand special Federal responsibilities and research and training programs with respect to individuals with disabilities, to establish special responsibilities in the Secretary of Health, Education, and Welfare for coordination of all programs with respect to individuals with disabilities within the Department of Health, Education, and Welfare, and for other purposes. It created the Rehabilitation Services Administration.

The Rehabilitation Act requires affirmative action in employment by the federal government and by government contractors and prohibits discrimination on the basis of disability in programs conducted by federal agencies, in programs receiving federal financial assistance, in federal employment, and in the employment practices of federal contractors. The standards for determining employment discrimination under the Rehabilitation Act are the same as those used in title I of the Americans with Disabilities Act.

President Richard Nixon signed H.R. 8070 into law on September 26, 1973 after he had vetoed two previous versions.

== Section 501 ==
Section 501 requires affirmative action and nondiscrimination in employment by Federal agencies of the executive branch. To obtain more information or to file a complaint, employees must contact their agency's Equal Employment Opportunity Office.

== Section 503 ==
Section 503 requires affirmative action and prohibits employment discrimination by Federal government contractors and subcontractors with contracts of more than $10,000.

== Section 504 ==
Section 504 created and extended civil rights to people with disabilities. Section 504 has also provided opportunities for children and adults with disabilities in education, employment, and various other settings. It even allows for reasonable accommodations such as special study area and assistance as necessary for each student.

Each Federal agency has its own set of section 504 regulations that apply to its own programs. Agencies that provide Federal financial assistance also have section 504 regulations covering entities that receive Federal aid. Requirements common to these regulations include reasonable accommodation for employees with disabilities; program accessibility; effective communication with people who have hearing or vision disabilities; and accessible new construction and alterations. Each agency is responsible for enforcing its own regulations. Section 504 may also be enforced through private lawsuits. It is not necessary to file a complaint with a Federal agency or to receive a "right-to-sue" letter before going to court.

== Section 505 ==
Section 505 contains provisions governing remedies and attorney's fees under Section 501.

== Section 508 ==
Section 508 establishes requirements for electronic and information technology developed, maintained, procured, or used by the Federal government. Section 508 requires Federal electronic and information technology to be accessible to people with disabilities, including employees and members of the public.

An accessible information technology system is one that can be operated in a variety of ways and does not rely on a single sense or ability of the user. For example, a system that provides output only in visual format may not be accessible to people with visual impairments, and a system that provides output only in audio format may not be accessible to people who are deaf or hard of hearing. Some individuals with disabilities may need accessibility-related software or peripheral devices in order to use systems that comply with Section 508.

== Operational administration of the disability civil rights laws ==
Court cases occur because operational administration of the laws may be faulty in individual or related to classes (e.g., restaurant industry, sensory impairments), or there is disagreement about the law itself (e.g., definition of reasonable accommodation), in addition to other reasons (e.g., disagreement that citizens are entitled to civil rights). Experts in civil rights laws are involved in education of governments, Americans with disabilities, citizens, special interest groups (e.g., disability classes), non-profit and for-profit agencies, and community groups on the "application of these federal laws" in daily lives, including workplaces.

In the area of employment law, Syracuse University's Peter Blanck, Executive of the Burton Blatt Institute since it was founded in 2005, has offered detailed advice on the implementation of central concepts of the employment-rehabilitation laws. While the Americans with Disabilities Act (ADA) of 1990 is the current base law, the Rehabilitation Act of 1973, amended in 1978 is also cited in these legal cases, including accommodations for individuals with intellectual and developmental disabilities. Hearings at the local levels often do not recognize experts in practice, and thus legal cases repeatedly must be appealed through the federal systems.

Personal assistance in the workplace has also been supported as a reasonable accommodation, a central concept in employment and disability law (Sections IV &4.8, 4.11; XI & 11.6, 11.8, 11.10; XVI & 16.7, 16.8). The American Association on Intellectual and Developmental Disabilities has indicated that supported employment is considered to be a workplace accommodation under the Americans with Disabilities Act of 1990 (Sections IV & 4.7, 4.11; XI & 11.6, 11.8, 11.10: XVI & 16.7,16.8).

== Significant amendments ==
Significant amendments were made to the Rehabilitation Act in 1974. The most important was the expansion of the definition of "handicapped individual." The original 1973 Act defined a "handicapped individual" as

any individual who (A) has a physical or mental disability which for such individual constitutes or results in a substantial handicap to employment and (B) can reasonably be expected to benefit in terms of employability from vocational rehabilitation services provided pursuant to titles I and III of this Act.

The 1974 amendments substituted a much broader definition of "handicapped individual" applicable to employment by the federal government (Section 501), modification or elimination of architectural and transportation barriers (Section 502), employment by federal contractors (section 503) and to programs receiving federal financial assistance (Section 504) that was not related to employability through vocational rehabilitation services. The 1974 amendments provided a handicapped individual meant

any person who (A) has a physical or mental impairment which substantially limits one or more of such person's major life activities, (B) has a record of such an impairment, or (C) is regarded as having such an impairment.

Congress adopted that definition in the Americans with Disabilities Act of 1990, substituting the term "disability" for "handicapped."

In 1986, Public Law 99-506 helped the Rehabilitation Act to refine and focus services offered to those with the most severe disabilities. Supported employment was also defined as a "legitimate rehabilitation outcome".

Title four of the Workforce Investment Act of 1998 amended the Rehabilitation Act in order to work with the WIA to accomplish the goal of helping people return to the workforce. Title four created a national council on disability, appointed by the president, to link rehabilitation programs to state and local workforce development systems. However, the Workforce Investment Act was repealed and replaced by the 2014 Workforce Innovation and Opportunity Act.

== See also ==
=== List of court cases ===
- Coleman v. Schwarzenegger
- Plata v. Schwarzenegger
- School Bd. of Nassau County v. Arline, 480 U.S. 273 (1987)

=== Related laws ===
- Adoption Assistance and Child Welfare Act, 1980
- Americans with Disabilities Act of 1990
- ADA Amendments Act of 2008
- Civil Rights Act of 1964
- The Developmental Disabilities Assistance and Bill of Rights Act of 2000
- Education for All Handicapped Children Act
- Individuals with Disabilities Education Act
- Individuals with Disabilities Education Improvement Act
- Family Educational Rights and Privacy Act
- Family Support Law of New York, as of 2015
- Health and Human Services Policies for the Protection of Research Subjects, 2005
- Maternal and Child Health Act of 1935, Amended 2013
- Social Security Act of 1935
- Title XIX of the Social Security Act
- Technology-Related Assistance Act for Persons with Disabilities
- Ticket to Work
- Ticket-to-Work Incentives Improvement Act of 1999
- Vocational Rehabilitation Act of 1974

=== Related organizations ===
- American Association on Intellectual and Developmental Disabilities
- Beach Center on Families, University of Kansas
- Consortium of Citizens with Disabilities-US
- World Institute on Disability

== Sources ==
- Switzer, Jacqueline Vaughn (2003). Disabled Rights: American Disability Policy and the Fight for Equality. Georgetown University Press. ISBN 978-0-87840-897-9. OCLC 50503215.
- OCR Senior Staff Memoranda, "Guidance on the Application of Section 504 to Noneducational Programs of Recipients of Federal Financial Assistance," January 3, 1990.
- Lynch, William, "The Application of Title III of the Americans with Disabilities Act to the Internet: Proper E-Planning Prevents Poor E-Performance," 12 CommLaw Conspectus: Journal of Communications Law and Policy 245 (2004).
