= California Health Care Facility =

State prison in Stockton, California

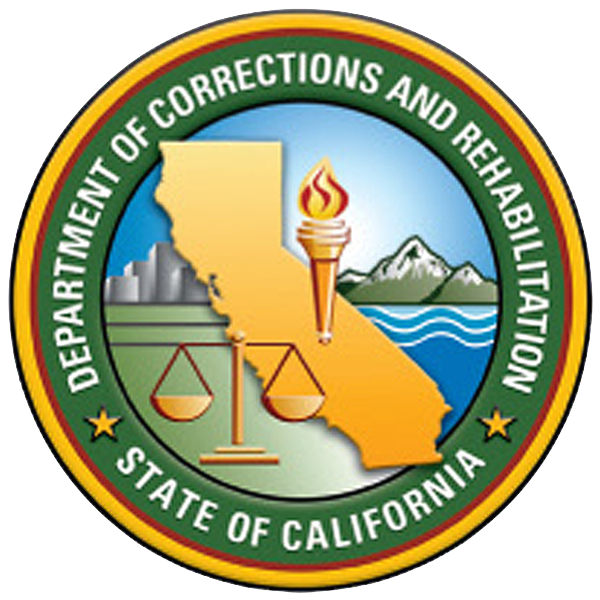
- Aerial View
- Interactive map of California Health Care Facility
- Location: San Joaquin County, near Stockton, California; 37.895°N 121.194°W
- Status: Operational
- Capacity: 2,953
- Population: 2,401 (81.3%) (January 31, 2023)
- Opened: July 2013
- Managed by: California Department of Corrections and Rehabilitation
- Warden: Gena Jones

California Health Care Facility (CHCF) is a state prison for incarcerated patients with long-term medical needs or acute mental health needs. The prison is located in unincorporated San Joaquin County, California, with a Stockton post office address, on the site of the former Karl Holton Youth Correctional Facility. Incarcerated people of all security levels are treated at the facility.

== Facilities and programs ==
The 61-building medical complex was built in response to two federal class action civil rights lawsuits (Plata v. Schwarzenegger and Coleman v. Schwarzenegger), after which a federal court in Sacramento ruled that the California Department of Corrections and Rehabilitation's medical and mental health services violated the Eighth Amendment to the United States Constitution's prohibition on cruel and unusual punishment. The facility cost $839 million to construct and employs approximately 4,000 custody, medical and support staff.

Facilities include a diagnostic center, dental clinic, dialysis clinic, memory care center, and palliative care unit. CHCF provides both inpatient and outpatient medical and mental health treatment.

As of April 30, 2020, CHCF was incarcerating people at 93.2% of its design capacity, with 2,751 occupants.

== Notable events ==
In March of 2019, CDCR confirmed a patient who had been incarcerated at CHCF and died tested positive after death for Legionnaires' disease. After additional testing of patients with pneumonia, one additional patient tested positive for Legionnaires' disease and was treated at the facility. In response to the outbreak, CHCF temporarily shut off some water access, including showers, and instead provided bottled water for drinking and hygiene.

== Notable inmates ==
- David Carpenter, Serial Killer known as the Trailside Killer, sentenced to death for the murders of at least seven people. Transferred from San Quentin State Prison to CHCF due to the abolishment of death row.
- Joseph Naso, Serial killer sentenced to death in 2013 for the murders of at least four women. Transferred from San Quentin State Prison to CHCF due to the abolishment of death row.
- Kevin Cooper, mass murderer: Transferred in May 2024.
- Robert Durst, real-estate heir; convicted of murder (died in 2022 during the pendency of appeals)
- Billy Mansfield, serial killer
- Herbert Mullin, serial killer; died in 2022 in custody
- Hans Reiser, founder of Namesys and convicted murderer
- John Floyd Thomas Jr., serial killer.
- Joe Son, former actor (best known for his appearance as Random Task in Austin Powers: International Man of Mystery), and former mixed martial artist. Convicted of felony torture and Voluntary manslaughter for murdering his cellmate

== See also ==
- List of California state prisons
