= Joseph Nissensohn =

American serial killer

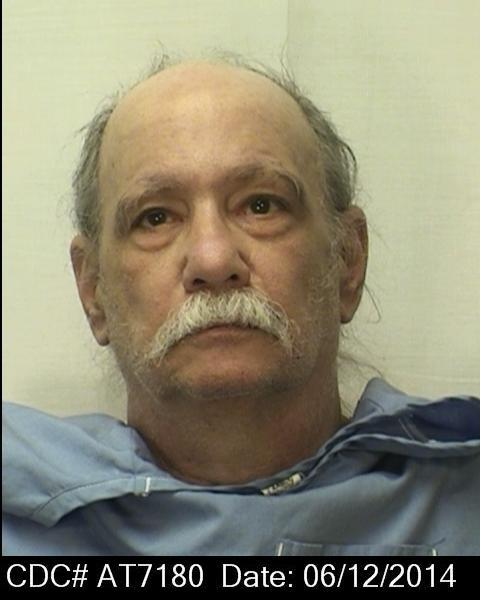
- Born: Joseph Michael Nissensohn; December 31, 1950 (age 75); North Carolina, U.S.
- Convictions: California: First-degree murder with special circumstances x3 Washington: Second-degree murder Attempted murder
- Penalty: California: Death; Washington: 25 years

Details
- Victims: 4+
- Span of crimes: 1981–1989
- Country: United States
- States: California, Washington (possibly Oklahoma and Nevada)
- Date apprehended: September 5, 1990
- Imprisoned at: California Health Care Facility, Stockton, California

Joseph Michael Nissensohn (born December 31, 1950) is an American serial killer. Originally convicted for the 1989 murder of a teenage girl in Washington State, he was later linked to at least three further murders committed in California from 1981 to 1989. For these crimes, he was convicted again and sentenced to death, and currently remains on the state's death row.

== Early life ==
Very little is known about Nissensohn's early life. Born on December 31, 1950. His family started out in Brooklyn and made his way to Queens then ended up in Nassau County. His father was a New York City detective who was involved with the French Connection with Eddie Egan and Jimmy "Popeye" Doyle. Eddie Egan used to give Joseph rides into the city when he was younger. He entered the Marine Corp and once he got out he headed west by hitchhiking across the country. He started working as a truck driver in the late 1960s, shortly after graduating from high school. For the following two decades, Nissensohn visited many parts of the country, frequenting red-light districts where he had sex with prostitutes and used drugs. In the mid-1980s, he met a woman named Cheryl Rose, and the pair married on August 22, 1989.

== Murder of Sally Tsaggaris ==
On September 5, 1990, Nissensohn was arrested at a motel in Atlanta, Georgia, and charged with the murder of 46-year-old prostitute Sally Jo Tsaggaris, who had been murdered on May 3, 1989, in Tillicum, Washington. According to the testimony of his wife, she, along with Nissensohn and her son from a previous marriage, were living in the area and spent much of the time doing drugs. As he partook in BDSM, Nissensohn kept various equipment in the back of his truck for bondage practises. On the aforementioned date, he paid Tsaggaris for sex and invited her over.

According to Cheryl, Nissensohn and Tsaggaris took large amounts of methamphetamines and then had sex, with the former torturing and humiliating the latter. When Tsaggaris started resisting, a fight ensued, during which Nissensohn stabbed her two times. Cheryl then claimed that she helped her husband dispose of the body and both left for California, settling in South Lake Tahoe. During their stay there, Nissensohn met 15-year-old Kathy Graves, a homeless runaway. Cheryl claimed that Nissensohn and Graves had a sexual relationship, spending most of the time drinking and doing drugs.

On August 10, Nissensohn drove Cheryl and Graves to a wooded area where, according to Cheryl, he assaulted and killed the teenager. She claimed that they then fled California and moved to Florida, where Nissensohn threatened to kill her because she was a witness to the murder. In the summer of 1990, in the aftermath of a severe beating by a new boyfriend, Cheryl fled and went to a homeless shelter. The residents there called an ambulance, and after being given prompt medical attention, she was interrogated by local police. She then revealed that her husband had killed Graves and Tsaggaris, in addition to claiming that he had committed three other murders: two in Oklahoma and one in Nevada.

Sometime afterwards, Nissensohn was arrested and charged with Tsaggaris' murder. On October 17, 1991, he was found guilty by jury verdict and sentenced to 25 years imprisonment by a court in Washington State.

== Later charges, trial, and sentence ==
In late 2007, Nissensohn was granted parole, with a due release date on February 8, 2008. However, on January 29, the District Attorney's Office in El Dorado County, California, filed criminal charges against him for the murder of Kathy Graves. As a result, Nissensohn was moved to the Pierce County Jail to await extradition to California. Before this, a judge ordered that he must undergo a sexual predator commitment hearing.

In October of that year, he was charged with two additional murders by the Monterey County Prosecutor's Office. These were the murders of 13-year-old Tammy Lynn Jarschke and 14-year-old Tanja Jones, who ran away on June 24, 1981, from a Seaside foster home. On September 9, 1981, a group of loggers discovered Jones' decomposing body in a forested area, having been tied to a tree with electrical wire. A search of the area led to the skeletal remains of Jarschke.

In mid-2009, Nissensohn was extradited from Washington to California, and in February 2010, a preliminary hearing was held to determine whether there was sufficient evidence for him to stand trial. The prosecution's main evidence consisted of witness testimony provided by Nissensohn's best friend, Jesse Prieto, who claimed that both of them had picked the girls up in late 1981. According to Prieto, on June 25, after sharing alcoholic beverages and drugs, Nissensohn drove the girls to a wooded area where they were beaten, raped, and strangled. Nissensohn's lawyers asked for the case to be thrown out of court for lack of concrete evidence implicating their client, but after weeks of court hearings, Justice Suzanne Kingsbury ordered that a trial would be held in July. The Monterey and El Dorado County prosecutors filed a motion to consolidate the cases into one trial which, despite the objections of Nissensohn's attorneys, was granted.

== Trial and sentence ==
Nissensohn's trial began in November 2013. The main evidence against him consisted of the witness testimonies of Prieto and his ex-wife Cheryl, and since both died prior to the trial's beginning, the prosecution provided the court with transcripts of their testimony. Nissensohn maintained his innocence in the Jarschke-Jones murders and claimed that his ex-wife had killed Graves while he was out to buy drugs. His attorneys demanded that Cheryl's testimony be invalidated, as they pointed out that she had given conflicting accounts on when and how Graves had been murdered.

Despite the conflicting evidence and inconsistencies, Nissensohn was found guilty by jury verdict in late October 2013, and was subsequently sentenced to death on December 11, 2013.

== Status ==
As of June 2026, Nissensohn remains on California's death row and is currently incarcerated at the California Health Care Facility.

== See also ==
- List of death row inmates in the United States § California
- Capital punishment in California
- List of serial killers in the United States
