= Arie Rimmerman =

Israeli academic (born 1950)

- אריק רימרמן
- Born: March 24, 1950 (age 76)
- Occupation: Professor
- Spouse: Shula
- Children: 2

Academic work
- Discipline: Social welfare
- Sub-discipline: Disability policy
- Institutions: University of Haifa

Arie Rimmerman (Hebrew: אריק רימרמן; born March 24, 1950) is an Israeli academic in disability policy research. As of 2018, he is the Richard Crossman Professor of Social Welfare and Social Planning at the University of Haifa, Israel and was the founder Dean of the Social Welfare and Health Sciences faculty. He has been a distinguished Professor at the Newhouse School of Public Communication, Syracuse University, and has also lectured at Harvard University, University of Pennsylvania, and Charles University, Prague.

In Israel, Rimmerman has initiated and established the first rehabilitation graduate program in social work at Bar-Ilan University (1981), the Israeli Association for the Scientific Study of Intellectual Disability (1983). He was a consultant to the committee that drafted the 'Equal Rights for Persons with Disabilities Law' 5758–1998. He led the Committee of Experts on Transition from Institutional to Community Care for Persons with Intellectual Disabilities (2011) and chaired the committee that proposed new policy to veterans with disabilities (2017). His scholarly contribution to disability has been significant in social inclusion, family policy and community living.

Rimmerman's scholarly work focuses on social inclusion. He has published 11 books and more than 200 peer-reviewed articles and research reports in Israel, Australia, Europe and the United States. He is the author of three recent books by Cambridge University Press: Social Inclusion and People with Disabilities: National and International Perspectives (2013); Family Policy and Disability (2015); and Disability and Community Living Policies (2017). Social Inclusion and People with Disabilities was translated recently to Arabic by King Saud University, Saudi Arabia. A new forthcoming book is Aging Veterans with Disabilities: A Cross-National Study of Policies and Challenges published by Routledge.

He is the author of Aging Veterans with Disabilities: A Cross-National Study of Policies and Challenges (2021) by Routledge. His recent book Social Inclusion of People with Disabilities Revisited: Perspectives Reflected by the COVID-19 Pandemic was published in 2024 by Oxford University Press. and Challenges (2021) by Routledge. He is the author of two recent books related to people with disabilities related to COVID 19 and post-pandemic era in UK and in the US: Rimmerman, A. (2026). Prospects for Employment of Persons with Disabilities in the Post-COVID-19 Era. Oxford University Press, and Rimmerman, A. (2024). Social inclusion of people with disabilities revisited: perspectives reflected by the COVID-19 pandemic. Oxford University Press.

Rimmerman is the recipient of the Lehman Award (1987), Fulbright Doctoral Student Fellowship (1979), the William Trump Award (1998), the International Award of the American Association on Intellectual and Developmental Disabilities (1999) and the Burton Blatt Institute Distinguished Leadership Award (2006). He recently received the 2020 Landau Scientific Award (Social Work).

He is married to Shula Rimmerman, an artist specializing in fused glass. They have two children.

== Selected publications ==
Books

- Rimmerman, A. (2012). Social Inclusion of People with Disabilities. Cambridge University Press. ISBN 9781139035668.
- —— (2015). Family policy and disability. Cambridge University Press. ISBN 9781107278806.
- —— (2017). Disability and community living policies. Cambridge University Press. ISBN 9781316493045.
- —— (2020). Aging Veterans with Disabilities: A Cross-National Study of Policies and Challenges. Oxfordshire: Routledge. ISBN 9780367335908.
- ------ (2021). Aging veterans with disabilities: A cross-national study of policies and challenges. Routledge.
- ------ (2024). Social Inclusion of People with Disabilities Revisited: Perspectives Reflected by the COVID-19 Pandemic. Oxford University Press.
- ---- (2026). Prospects for Employment of Persons with Disabilities in the Post-COVID-19 Era. Oxford University Press.

Research articles

- Gur, A., Amsalem, G., & Rimmerman, A. (2020). Parents' psychological, social and financial outcomes as related to the transition of their offspring with ID from adolescence to adulthood. Research in Developmental Disabilities, 105, 103740.
- Beenstock, M., Pinto, O., & Rimmerman, A. (2020). Transition Into Adulthood With Autism Spectrum Disorders: A Longitudinal Population Cohort Study of Socioeconomic Outcomes. Journal of Disability Policy Studies, 1044207320943590.
- Gur, A. & Rimmerman, A. (2017). Online Activity, Offline Sociability, and Life Satisfaction Among Israelis with and Without Disabilities. Cyberpsychology, Behavior, and Social Networking, 20(11), 695-701.
- Rimmerman, A. & Soffer, M. (2016). The making of disability policy in Israel: Ad-hoc advisory experts' panels. In G. Menahem & A. Zehavi (Eds.). Policy Analysis in Israel. University of Bristol: Policy Press.
- Rimmerman, A., Soffer, M., David, D., Dagan, T., Rothler, R. & Mishaly, L. (2015). Mapping the terrain of disability legislation: The case of Israel. Society & Disability, 30, 46-58.
- Rimmerman, A. & Araten-Bergman, T. (2009). Employment and Social Participation among Israelis with Disabilities, Journal of Social Work Disability and Rehabilitation. 8, 132-145.
- Rimmerman, A & Herr, S.S. (2004). The power of the powerless: A study of the 2000s disability strike in Israel, Journal of Disability Policy Studies, 15(1), 12-18.
- Rimmerman, A.; Raif, R. (2001). "Involvement with and role perception toward adult siblings with and without mental retardation". Journal of Rehabilitation. 67 (2): 11–16 – via Questia.
- Rimmerman, A. (1998). Factors relating to attitudes of Israeli corporate executives toward the employability of persons with intellectual disability. Journal of Intellectual & Developmental Disability, 23, 245-254..
- Rimmerman, A.; Levy, J. M.; Levy, P. H.; Botuck, S. (January–March 1995). "Predicting the likelihood of job-placement: A short time perspective". The Journal of Rehabilitation. 61 (1): 50–54. Archived from the original on 2020-08-23 – via Questia.
