= William Mansfield =

William Mansfield may refer to:

- William Mansfield, 1st Baron Sandhurst (1819–1876), British military commander, Commander-in-Chief of India, 1865–1870
- William Mansfield, 1st Viscount Sandhurst (1855–1921), his son, British statesman
- William Mansfield (Labour MP), British Labour politician, MP for Cleveland, 1929–1931
- Billy Mansfield (William Mansfield Jr., born 1956), American serial killer, child molester and sex offender
- William Mansfield, suspect of the Villisca axe murders
