= John Floyd Thomas Jr. =

American serial killer (born 1936)

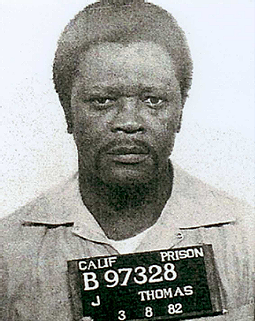
- 1982 California State Prison mugshot
- Born: July 26, 1936 (age 90); Los Angeles, California, U.S.
- Other names: The Westside Rapist; The Southland Strangler; Willie Eugene Wilson
- Conviction: First-degree murder with special circumstances (7 counts)
- Penalty: 7 consecutive life sentences without the possibility of parole

Details
- Victims: 7–30+
- Span of crimes: November 1972 – June 1986
- Country: United States
- State: California
- Date apprehended: March 31, 2009
- Imprisoned at: California Health Care Facility

John Floyd Thomas Jr. (born July 26, 1936) is an American serial killer, serving a life sentence without the possibility of parole for the murders of seven women in the Los Angeles area during the 1970s and 1980s. Police suspect Thomas committed up to 30 total murders, possibly making him one of the most prolific serial killers in the city's history.

On April 1, 2011, Thomas pleaded guilty to the seven counts of murder as part of a deal to avoid the death sentence.

== Early life ==
Thomas was born in Los Angeles and his mother died when he was 12 years old. He was later alternately raised by his aunt and a godmother. Throughout his childhood, Thomas attended public schools, including Manual Arts High School in Los Angeles. Thomas served in the U.S. Air Force in 1956 for a brief period of time. While stationed at Nellis Air Force Base in Nevada, a superior noted that Thomas was regularly "late" and "slovenly" in appearance.

He received a dishonorable discharge, according to his military records, and was arrested for burglary and attempted rape in Los Angeles. Thomas was convicted of these crimes and sentenced in 1957 to six years in the California state prison system. As a result of a pair of parole violations, Thomas remained incarcerated until 1966.

== Case history ==
The first wave of murders came in the mid-1970s, when police were on the hunt for a serial killer targeting older women in the western districts of Los Angeles, which led to the police dubbing the killer the "Westside Rapist." The killer's calling card was letting himself into the homes of elderly women who lived alone, raping them, either choking or suffocating them and leaving pillows or blankets over their faces after the attacks.

The killings appeared to stop in 1978, leaving at least 17 elderly women dead. However, in the mid-1980s, the police in the Pomona Valley area became aware of a serial killer with the same modus operandi as the "Westside Rapist." The killer, who was dubbed the "Southland Strangler," also used blankets or pillows over his victims' faces. Those murders left at least five women in Claremont dead.

The killings again appeared to stop in 1989, but the two serial murderer cases were not thought to be connected. Both cases left more than 20 people dead.

=== CODIS launch and re-examination ===
In 2001, the LAPD launched the "Open-Unsolved Homicide Unit," which reopened cold cases that included biological evidence that belonged to the perpetrators. The unit started after the launch of CODIS, which used DNA evidence left in cold cases and compared it to the DNA in federal databases. One of the many cases looked at was the murder of 68-year-old Ethel Sokoloff, who was found sexually assaulted and choked to death in her home in November 1972.

The re-investigation proved that there was biological evidence that was left behind but previously not examined. Based on this, a male DNA profile of the suspected killer was made. In 2005, it was found that the biological evidence left at the murder scene also matched the evidence left at the murder scene of 67-year-old Elizabeth McKeown, who was found sexually assaulted and murdered in March 1976.

== 2009 arrest ==
On March 27, 2009, the California Department of Justice notified the LAPD that a CODIS DNA match had been made and the killer had been identified in the murders of Ethel Sokoloff and Elizabeth McKeown, as well as the victims in the cases being investigated by the Inglewood Police Department and the LASD.

The offender had been identified as John Floyd Thomas, a resident of Los Angeles. A review of Thomas's criminal history revealed that he was arrested a number of times between 1955 and 1978. His criminal convictions consist of multiple burglaries, many of which involved sexual assaults of his victims. Other than an arrest for prostitution in 1993, Thomas has not had any other known law enforcement contact during recent years.

When the "Westside Rapist" killings appeared to stop in 1978, it was around the time Thomas was convicted and sentenced to state prison for the rape of a Pasadena woman. Thomas was released in 1983 and moved to Chino, which coincided with the "Southland Strangler" murders in the Pomona Valley area. Those murders appeared to stop when Thomas took a job with the state workers compensation insurance agency in Glendale.

Thomas was arrested on March 31, 2009, and on April 2, 2009, he was charged with the murders of Ethel Sokoloff and Elizabeth McKeown. On September 23, 2009, he was charged with the murders of Cora Perry in September 1975; Maybelle Hudson in April 1976; Miriam McKinley in June 1976; Evalyn Bunner in October 1976; and Adrienne Askew in June 1986.

A break in solving the related murders came in October 2008 when Thomas, then an insurance claims adjuster at the State Compensation Insurance Fund, provided a DNA sample to authorities in connection with an effort to create a database of such samples from convicted sex offenders in the state of California. He was held without bail at the LA County Jail.

Although he was charged with seven murders, investigators said they strongly believe he killed 15 or more women in the "Westside Rapist" and "Southland Strangler" period, and raped many more. On April 1, 2011, Thomas pleaded guilty to the seven counts of murder as part of a deal to avoid the death sentence for the Adrienne Askew murder. He was sentenced to life imprisonment without the possibility of parole.

== Murders ==
Thomas was charged with the following murders:

- Ethel Sokoloff (#1), 68, was found murdered in her Mid-Wilshire home on November 25, 1972
- Cora Perry (#10), 79, was found murdered on September 20, 1975; her kitchen window was found open, the screen missing
- Elizabeth McKeown (#13), 67, was reported missing on February 16, 1976; she was found raped and strangled two days later in the trunk of her car
- Maybelle Hudson (#14), 80, was found beaten, sexually assaulted, and strangled in her garage in April 1976
- Miriam McKinley (#15), 65, was found beaten and strangled in her garage in June 1976
- Evalyn Bunner (#16), 56, was found slumped in the front seat of her car on October 29, 1976; the back of her dress was unzipped and pulled up to her waist, revealing bruises on her upper legs
- Adrienne Askew (#18), 56, was found sexually assaulted and strangled in June 1986, just three years after her mother had suffered the same fate, in the same apartment

Thomas was suspected of being involved in the following murders:

- Ethyl Grimes (#2), 81, was found robbed and strangled in her apartment on May 13, 1974
- Maye Scialesi (#3), 72, was found murdered on November 7, 1974; the killer entered her apartment through her bathroom window
- Lucy Grant (#4), 92, was found raped and murdered in her home on November 8, 1974; there were signs of forced entry, and the home appeared to be burglarized
- Ramona Gartner (#5), 74, was found murdered in her apartment on December 4, 1974
- Sylvia Vogel (#6), 71, was found under a blanket in the backseat of her car, beaten, raped, and murdered, on March 22, 1975
- Una Cartwright (#7), 78, was found raped and murdered in her apartment on April 8, 1975; her door was found open, and a TV was stolen
- Olga Harper (#8), 75, was last seen entering her apartment on April 20, 1975; three days later, she was found beaten, raped, and murdered in her home on April 23, 1975
- Effie Martin (#9), 86, was found beaten, raped, and strangled in her apartment on May 22, 1975; the murderer was suspected to be the "Westside Rapist," but some sources also referred to the killer as the "Wilshire Area Rapist"
- Leah Leshefsky (#11), 63, was found raped and strangled in her home on October 29, 1975; her window was forced open, and her apartment was ransacked
- Lilian Kramer (#12), 67, was found murdered in her apartment on November 14, 1975; police suspected the Westside rapist because of "certain points of similarity"
- Isabel Askew (#17), 85, was found, partially decomposed, 11 days after she was reported missing from her apartment on October 22, 1983

== See also ==
- List of serial killers in the United States
- List of serial killers by number of victims
