= Plata v. Schwarzenegger =

Plata v. Newsom, Docket No. 4:01-cv-01351-JST (N.D. Cal.), is a federal class action civil rights lawsuit alleging that the California Department of Corrections and Rehabilitation's (CDCR) medical services are inadequate and violate the Eighth Amendment, the Americans with Disabilities Act, and section 504 of the Rehabilitation Act of 1973. As a result of the case, the CDCR's prison medical conditions were found to be in violation of the Eighth Amendment to the United States Constitution. After repeated violations of a stipulated agreement and order for injunctive relief, the CDCR was held in civil contempt and the medical health care system was placed in receivership.

The case was consolidated with Coleman v. Schwarzenegger and assigned to a three-judge court on July 26, 2007, to hear motions for relief pursuant to the Prison Litigation Reform Act. An order to reduce the prison population was entered on January 12, 2010, which California claims is unconstitutional in its appeal before the Supreme Court.

== History ==
=== Complaint ===
The case was filed on April 5, 2001, and re-filed with an amended complaint on August 20, 2001. The alleged deficiencies included inadequate medical screening of incoming prisoners; delays in or failure to provide access to medical care, including specialist care; untimely responses to medical emergencies; the interference of custodial staff with the provision of medical care; the failure to recruit and retain sufficient numbers of competent medical staff; disorganized and incomplete medical records; a "lack of quality control procedures, including lack of physician peer review, quality assurance and death reviews"; a lack of protocols to deal with chronic illnesses, including diabetes, heart disease, hepatitis, and HIV; and the failure of the administrative grievance system to provide timely or adequate responses to complaints concerning medical care. The claims alleged that patients being treated by the CDCR received inadequate medical care that resulted in the deaths of 34 incarcerated patients.

=== Stipulation ===
The plaintiffs and defendants negotiated a stipulation for injunctive relief, which the court approved by court order on June 13, 2002, requiring defendants to provide "only the minimum level of medical care required under the Eighth Amendment."

=== Receivership ===
However, three years after approving the stipulation as an order of the court, the court conducted an evidentiary hearing that revealed the continued existence of appalling conditions arising from defendants' failure to provide adequate medical care to incarcerated Californians. As a result, the court ruled in June 2005 and issued an order on October 3, 2005, putting the CDCR's medical health care delivery system in receivership. The receivership went into effect in April 2006.

=== Three-Judge Court ===
18 U.S.C. § 3626, a statute created by the Violent Crime Control and Law Enforcement Act and further amended by the Prison Litigation Reform Act, sets forth remedies with respect to prison conditions. On October 4, 2006, the Governor Schwarzenegger issued Proclamation 4278, declaring a state of emergency. Following the Governor's issuance of the State of Emergency Proclamation, the plaintiffs in Plata and Coleman filed motions to convene a three-judge court to limit the prison population. During the pending motions, the Little Hoover Commission released its report titled "Solving California's Corrections Crisis: Time Is Running Out" and the CDCR Expert Panel on Adult Offender Recidivism Reduction Programming released its report, both advocating a reduction in prison overcrowding. On July 23, 2007, both the Plata and Coleman courts granted the plaintiff's motions and recommended that the cases be assigned to the same three-judge court. The Chief Judge of the United States Court of Appeals for the Ninth Circuit agreed and, on July 26, 2007, convened the instant three-judge district court pursuant to 28 U.S.C. § 2284.

==== Release Order ====
On August 4, 2009, the three-judge court ordered that the defendants submit a plan within 45 days detailing "a population reduction plan that will in no more than two years reduce the population of the CDCR's adult institutions to 137.5% of their combined design capacity." The panel argued that substantial numbers of those in prison could be released without affecting public safety, through such measures as parole reform, community treatment of non-violent prisoners and release of inmates who have demonstrated good behavior.

The state submitted a plan on September 18, 2009, but the plan failed to meet requirements set by the release order. On October 21, 2009, the court rejected the plan, and gave the government until November 12 to submit a corrected plan or it would order the attorneys for the plaintiffs to submit a plan and order it implemented. The state submitted a revised plan on November 12, 2009, and the plan was accepted and entered as an order of the court on January 12, 2010.

=== Supreme Court ===
California appealed the order to the Supreme Court on January 19, 2010, and the Court postponed jurisdictional questions relating to the appeal on June 14, 2010. It was argued on November 30, 2010.

On May 23, 2011, the Court issued an opinion, Brown v. Plata, No. 09-1233, written by Justice Kennedy. The Court held (1) The three-judge court limits on the prison population were necessary to remedy the violation of prisoners' constitutional rights and were authorized by the Prison Litigation Reform Act (PLRA); (2) The three-judge court's order, subject to the State's right to seek its modification in appropriate circumstances, must be affirmed.

Justice Scalia wrote a dissenting opinion, to which Justice Thomas joined.

Justice Alito wrote a dissenting opinion, to which Justice Roberts joined.

== Reactions ==
Governor of California Arnold Schwarzenegger and California Attorney General Jerry Brown opposed the takeover by a receiver, citing the billions in costs that would have to be incurred to build new medical facilities for prisoners. In March 2009, the court-appointed receiver filed a contempt order against Schwarzenegger and California State Controller John Chiang for the refusal to turn over $250 million needed to rehabilitate existing medical facilities.

== See also ==
- Coleman v. Schwarzenegger
