= Southeastern Community College v. Davis =

- Supreme Court of the United States

Argued April 23, 1979 Decided June 11, 1979
- Full case name: Southeastern Community College v. Frances B. Davis
- Citations: 442 U.S. 397 (more) 99 S. Ct. 2361; 60 L. Ed. 2d 980

Case history
- Prior: 424 F. Supp. 1341 (E.D.N.C. 1976); reversed, 574 F.2d 1158 (4th Cir. 1978)

Holding
- Nothing in the language or history of Section 504 of the Rehabilitation Act of 1973 limits the freedom of an educational institution to require reasonable physical qualifications for admission to a clinical training program.

Court membership
- Chief Justice Warren E. Burger Associate Justices William J. Brennan Jr. · Potter Stewart; Byron White · Thurgood Marshall; Harry Blackmun · Lewis F. Powell Jr. William Rehnquist · John P. Stevens

Case opinion
- Majority: Powell, joined by unanimous

Laws applied
- Section 504 of the Rehabilitation Act, 29 U.S.C. § 701 et seq.

Southeastern Community College v. Davis, 442 U.S. 397 (1979), was a United States Supreme Court Case from 1979. Its plaintiff was a hearing-impaired student who, after being denied access to the school's nursing department, filed a lawsuit against claiming violation of her rights under the Fourteenth amendment and Section 504 of the Rehabilitation Act of 1973.

== Background ==
Frances Davis was a student at Southeastern Community College and applied for the nursing program. Davis also had a hearing impairment, thus, she relied mostly on lip-reading, even with a hearing aid. When she was interviewed, the problem was quickly noticed and she was told to consult an audiologist. Davis was diagnosed with a “bilateral, sensori-neural hearing loss,” and even with a hearing aid she was only able to perceive speech when the speaker was facing towards her.

The Executive Director of the State Board of Nursing reviewed her application and decided that it would not be safe for her to be a student in the program or to be a nurse. It was also decided that the accommodations that would have to be made for Davis would stop her from fully benefiting from the program. Davis asked the board to review the application once again, but was denied.

After the second attempt, Davis filed a lawsuit claiming the school was denying her of the Fourteenth amendment and Section 504 of the Rehabilitation Act of 1973.

== Decision ==
The District Court decided that Davis was not an "otherwise qualified" applicant, that is, they believed her unable to work adequately as a nurse. Therefore she was not protected under Section 504, which states that a person must be able to perform all duties of a job, despite their disability.

According to The Law and Higher Education, the court stated that “In many situations such as an operation room intensive care unit, or post-natal care unit, all doctors and nurses wear surgical masks which would make lip-reading impossible. Additionally, in many situations, a Registered Nurse would be required to instantly follow a physician’s instructions concerning procurement of various types of instruments and drugs where the physician would be unable to get the nurse’s attention by other than vocal means.”

The Fourth Circuit reversed the district court's decision by pointing to recent administrative regulations regarding § 504 promulgated while Davis's appeal was pending. The Supreme Court then reversed the Fourth Circuit in a unanimous ruling, holding that the ability to hear was crucial in a nurse's daily work, and the necessary accommodations that the program would need to provide for Davis were beyond what § 504 requires.

== After the case ==
Southeastern Community College vs Davis was a landmark case because it helped define the interpretation of Section 504 regarding reasonable accommodations and what accommodations would drastically impact a program. It was considered a narrow ruling in that it only applies to clinical and professional programs. It was the first case that brought attention to Section 504 and allowed professional training programs to refuse accommodations that they claimed would affect the core of the program or that would have an unnecessary financial burden. Legal scholars have argued that the Court's ruling incorrectly conflates accommodations (measures that allow a disabled individual to perform capably) with modifications affecting the structure and content of the training program itself.
