= Peter Blanck =

American Academic & Lawyer

- Born: 1957 (age 68–69)
- Occupation: Professor
- Known for: work on the Americans with Disabilities Act of 1990, and on disability law and policy

Academic background
- Education: University of Rochester; Harvard University; Stanford Law School
- Thesis: Children's ability to decode discrepant and consistent social communications : learning how, when, and who to decode (1982)
- Doctoral advisor: Robert Rosenthal

Academic work
- Institutions: Syracuse University; University of Iowa

Peter David Blanck (born 1957) is an American academic, psychologist, and lawyer who is the university professor and chairman of the Burton Blatt Institute at Syracuse University.

== Early life and education ==
Blanck was born in Elmont, New York in 1957. He earned a bachelor's degree in psychology from University of Rochester in 1979, and a Ph.D. degree in social psychology from Harvard University in 1982 under the supervision of Robert Rosenthal. In 1981, Blanck was awarded the American Psychological Association’s Psi Chi/APA Edwin B. Newman Graduate Research Award.

After a one-year postdoctoral fellowship at Harvard University, Blanck earned a J.D. from the Stanford Law School in 1986. Blanck was elected President of the Stanford Law Review. He then served as a law clerk for Carl E. McGowan, judge on the United States Court of Appeals for the District of Columbia Circuit. Thereafter, Blanck was a legal associate at the Washington D.C. law firm Covington & Burling.

== Academic career ==
Blanck returned to academia in 1990 as an associate professor of law at the University of Iowa College of Law, adding a second professorship in psychology there in 1994. In 2002, he was named the Charles M. and Marion Kierscht Professor of Law.

In 2005, Blanck joined Syracuse University as the University Professor. At Syracuse, he is the chairman of the Burton Blatt Institute (BBI), which reaches around the globe in its efforts to advance the civic, economic, and social participation of people with disabilities with offices in Syracuse New York, Washington, D.C., Atlanta, Georgia, and Lexington, Kentucky.

In 2010, Blanck was appointed as an honorary professor at the Centre for Disability Law & Policy at National University Ireland, Galway. Blanck's work has been recognized in the United States and internationally.

In 2015, he won the Distinguished Service Award of NARRTC (formerly known as the National Association of Rehabilitation Research and Training Centers), which is presented to "individuals who have made impressive contributions to the field of disability through research, teaching, service, or advocacy. The Distinguished Service Award is generally given for sustained contributions or an accumulation of life-time achievements. It is the highest recognition conferred by NARRTC."

Over the course of his career, Blanck has received over $100 Million in grants and donations towards his work.

== Works ==
Blanck has written over 275 articles and books about the American with Disabilities Act (ADA) and related laws. He has received scores of millions of dollars in grants to study disability law and policy from federal and state entities, and from non-profits and foundations. His recent books include:

- Disability and the Future of Work (with Fitore Hyseni, Lisa Schur, and Doug Kruse, 2025)
- Disability Law and Policy (2024).(2nd ed)
- Advanced Introduction to Disability Law (2023).
- Disability Law and Policy (2020).
- Supported Decision-Making: From Justice for Jenny to Justice for All (with Jonathan Martinis, 2019).
- Supported Decision-Making: Theory, Research, and Practice to Enhance Self-Determination and Quality of Life (with Shogren, Wehmeyer, Martinis, 2019).
- Heavy Laden: Union Veterans, Psychological Illness, and Suicide (with Logue, 2018).
- e-Quality: The Struggle for Web Accessibility by People with Cognitive Disabilities (2014).
- Routledge Handbook of Disability Law and Human Rights (with Flynn, 2017).
- Genetic Discrimination–Transatlantic Perspectives on the Case for a European Level Legal Response (with Quinn & de Paor, 2015).
- People with Disabilities: Sidelined or Mainstreamed? (with Schur & Kruse, 2013).
- Legal Rights of Persons with Disabilities: An Analysis of Federal Law (with Goldstein & Myhill, 2013).
- Disability Civil Rights Law and Policy (with Myhill, Siegal, & Waterstone, 3d ed., 2013).
- Race, Ethnicity, and Disability: Veterans and Benefits in Post-Civil War America (with Logue, 2010).

Blanck served as an editor for the Cambridge University Press series Disability Law and Policy.

Blanck was chairman of the American Psychological Association, Committee on Disability Issues in Psychology (CDIP) (2022-2023 ). He serves on the board of visitors for the Stanford Law School, at Stanford University. He has served on the National Science Foundation (NSF) Committee of Visitors (COV), for the Division of Social and Economic Sciences (SES).

Blanck is chairman of the Global Universal Design Commission (GUDC), and former president of Raising the Floor (RtF) USA. He is a former member of the President's Committee on Employment of People with Disabilities, a former senior fellow of the Annenberg Washington Program, a former fellow at Princeton University's Woodrow Wilson School, and has been a Mary Switzer Scholar.

== Personal life ==
Blanck married Wendy Jo Kislik in 1983. They have four children.

While at Rochester, Blanck lettered in squash over the four-year period, and was elected team co-captain as a junior and senior. In 2008, he was inducted to the University of Rochester Athletic Hall of Fame.
