= California Reentry Program =

US non-profit organization

- Abbreviation: CRP
- Formation: 2003
- Type: non profit

The California Reentry Program (CRP) is a non-profit organization with the mission of helping California prisoners successfully reenter society. It has operated in San Quentin State Prison since 2003 when Allyson West, an algebra teacher at San Quentin at the time, helped one inmate with the reentry process and realized the importance of reentry work and the lack of ability or interest of the state to reduce recidivism. Working with San Quentin and recruiting volunteers, West founded the California Reentry Program which has helped several thousand prisoners so far. CRP's mission is to help all California prisoners, but due to lack of resources, it only operates in San Quentin. CRP incorporated in 2007 and received non-profit status in 2008. CRP has roughly 25 volunteers and helps about 150-200 clients per month.

The primary service offered by CRP is reentry advising ranging from helping clients with one question to helping clients make a long-term plan for reentry. This is a critical service because California prisoners have no Internet access and very limited contact with the outside world. CRP also runs a parole clothing program which gets donated clothing for prisoners upon release to provide an alternative to the $38 gray sweatsuits prisoners must purchase upon release otherwise.
