= California Department of Corrections and Rehabilitation =

Law enforcement agency in California, US

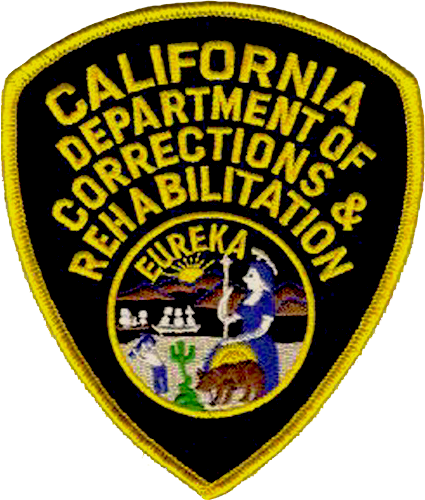

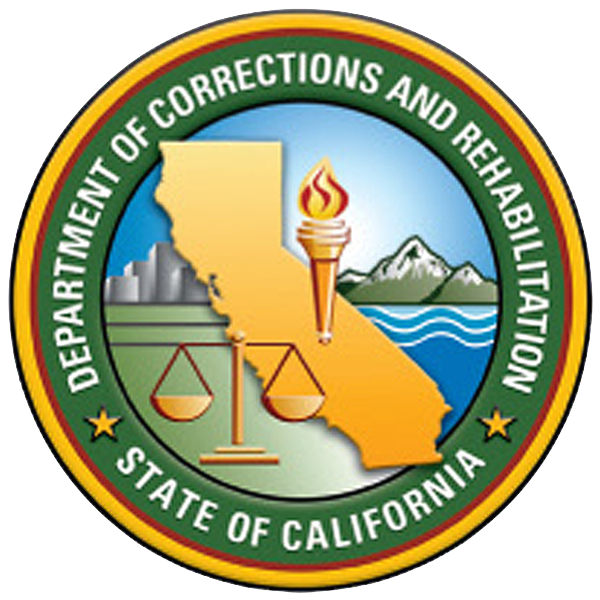

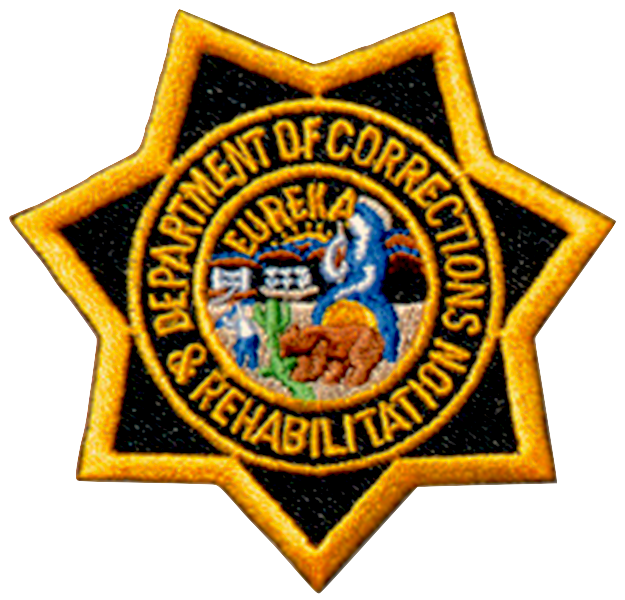
- Badge Patch of the California Department of Corrections and Rehabilitation
- Common name: Department of Corrections
- Abbreviation: CDCR

Agency overview
- Formed: 1885; 141 years ago
- Preceding agency: California Department of Corrections, California Youth Authority
- Employees: 24,000
- Annual budget: US$11.3 billion (2017/2018)

Jurisdictional structure
- Operations jurisdiction: California, U.S.
- Jurisdiction of the Department, excluding when transporting detainees in Nevada.
- Area: 163,696 square miles (423,970 km^{2})
- Population: 39,536,653 (2017 est.)
- Legal jurisdiction: As per operations jurisdiction
- General nature: Local civilian police

Operational structure
- Headquarters: Sacramento, California
- Parent agency: Youth and Adult Correctional Agency (1980–2004)

Facilities
- Patrol Cars: Ford Explorer Police Interceptor; Ford Crown Victoria Police Interceptor; Dodge Charger Police Interceptor; Ford Taurus Police Interceptor

Website
- www.cdcr.ca.gov

The California Department of Corrections and Rehabilitation (CDCR) is the penal law enforcement agency of the government of California in the United States responsible for the operation of the California state prison and parole systems. Its headquarters are in Sacramento.

== Staff size ==
CDCR is the 3rd largest law enforcement agency in the United States behind the U.S. Customs and Border Protection and the New York City Police Department, which employ approximately 67,000 federal officers and 42,000 police officers respectively. CDCR correctional officers are sworn law enforcement officers with peace officer powers.

As of 2013, CDCR employed approximately 24,000 peace officers (state correctional officers), 1,800 state parole agents, and 150 criminal investigators.

Jeff Macomber was appointed by Governor Gavin Newsom as Secretary for the California Department of Corrections and Rehabilitation (CDCR) on December 12, 2022.

== History ==
In 1851, California activated its first state-run institution. This institution was a 267-ton wooden ship named The Waban, and was anchored in San Francisco Bay. The prison ship housed 30 inmates who subsequently constructed San Quentin State Prison, which opened in 1852 with approximately 68 inmates.

Since 1852, the department has activated sixty-seven prisons across the state. CDCR's history dates back to 1912, when the agency was called California State Detentions Bureau. In 1951 it was renamed California Department of Corrections. In 2004 it was renamed California Department of Corrections and Rehabilitation.

In 2018-2019 it cost an average of $81,203 to house an inmate for one year.

== About CDCR ==
A map of CDCR locations across California.

=== Divisions ===
- Division of Adult Institutions (DAI)
- Division of Adult Parole Operations (DAPO)
- Division of Health Care Services (DHCS)
- Facility Planning, Construction and Management (FPCM)
- Division of Juvenile Justice (DJJ) - closed effective July 1, 2023
- Division of Rehabilitative Programs (DRP)
- Division of Investigation (ISU)

=== Offices ===
- Office of Appeals (OOA)
- Office of Audits and Court Compliance (OACC)
- Office of Business Services (OBS)
- Office of Civil Rights (OCR)
- Office of Correctional Safety (OCS)
- Office of Internal Affairs (OIA)
- Office of Legal Affairs (OLA)
- Office of Legislation
- Office of the Ombudsman
- Office of Peace Officer Selection (OPOS)
- Office of Personnel Services
- Office of Public and Employee Communications (OPEC)
- Office of Research
- Office of Training and Professional Development (OTPD)
- Office of Victim and Survivor Rights and Services (OVSRS)

=== Other programs ===
- COMPSTAT
- Board of Parole Hearings (BPH)
- Budget Management Branch (BMB)
- CCHCS Direct Care Contracts
- Commission on Correctional Peace Officer Standards and Training (CPOST)
- Council on Criminal Justice and Behavioral Health (CCJBH) - closed effective July 1, 2025
- California Correctional Training and Rehabilitation Authority (CALCTRA)

=== Facilities ===
CDCR operates all state institutions, oversees a variety of community correctional facilities and camps, and monitors all parolees during their entry back into society.

=== Institutions ===
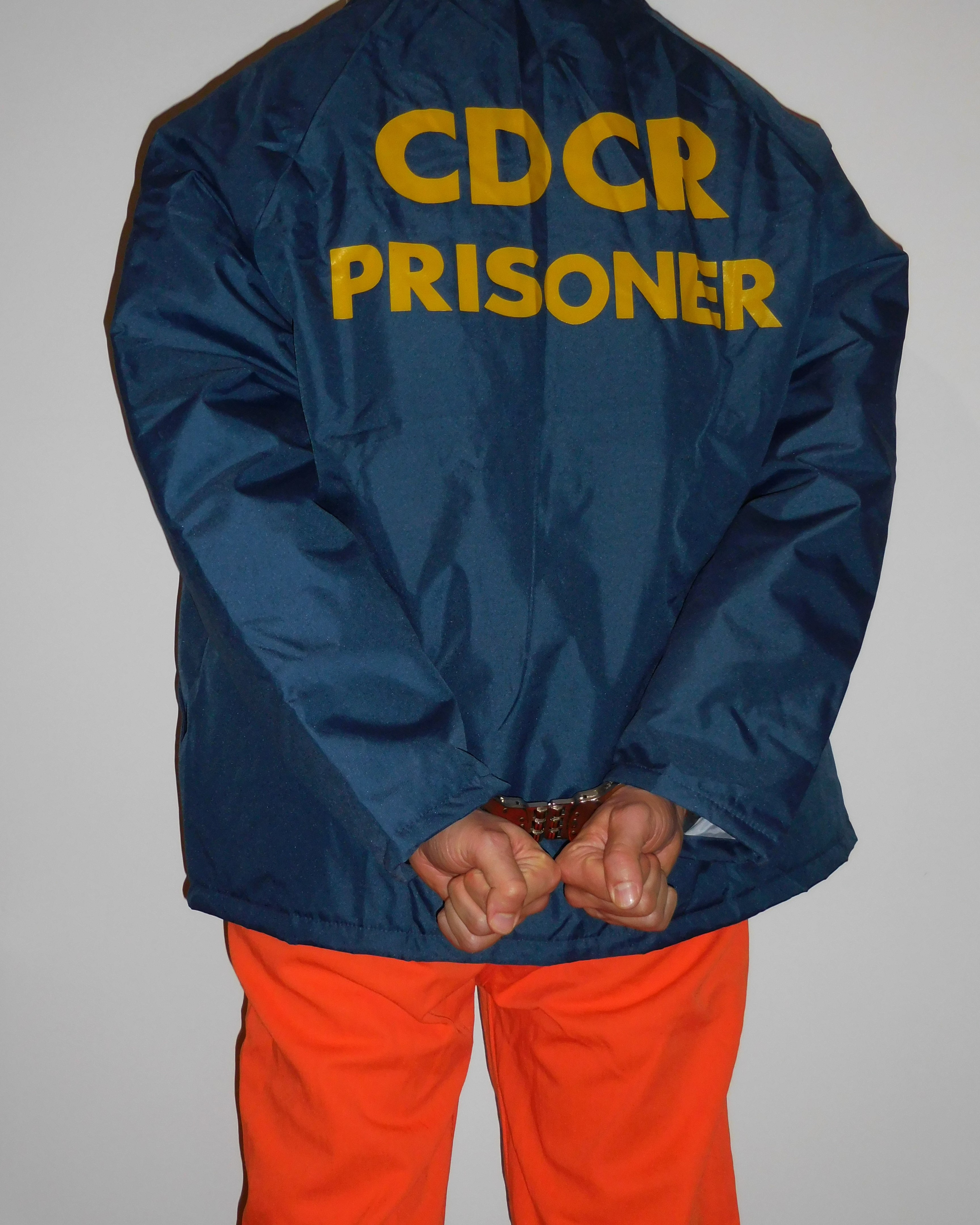
CDCR Prisoner in handcuffs

According to the Department's official Web site, "Currently there are 33 adult correctional institutions, 13 adult community correctional facilities, and eight juvenile facilities in California which house 92,298 adult offenders (as of 6/15/2025) and nearly 3,200 juvenile offenders." This inmate population makes the CDCR the largest state-run prison system in the United States.

Regarding adult prisons, CDCR has the task of receiving and housing inmates that were convicted of felony crimes within the State of California. Adult inmates arriving at a state prison are assigned a classification based on the offense committed via a point system. Each prison is designed to house different varieties of inmate offenders, from Level I inmates to Level IV inmates; the higher the level, the higher risk the inmate poses. Selected prisons within the state are equipped with security housing units, reception centers, and/or "condemned" units. Security levels are able to fluctuate depending on good or bad behavior while in prison once per year.

CDCR security levels are defined as follows:

- Level I: "Facilities and Camps consist primarily of open dormitories with a low security perimeter."
- Level II: "Facilities consist primarily of open dormitories with a secure perimeter, which may include armed coverage."
- Level III: "Facilities primarily have a secure perimeter with armed coverage and housing units with cells adjacent to exterior walls."
- Level IV: "Facilities have a secure perimeter with internal and external armed coverage and housing units or cell block housing with cells non-adjacent to exterior walls."
- Restricted Housing Unit (RHU): "The most secure area within a Level IV prison designed to provide maximum coverage." These are designed to handle inmates where prison staff believe the prison general population poses an immediate threat to the inmate's own safety or the safety of others; endangers institution security; or jeopardizes an investigation into serious misconduct, criminal activity, or safety concerns.
- Reception Center (RC): "Provides short term housing to process, classify and evaluate incoming inmates."
- Condemned (Cond): "Holds inmates with death sentences."

Inmates on Condemned Status

Historically, state law mandated male prisoners on condemned status be housed at San Quentin State Prison and women on condemned status be housed at Central California Women’s Facility. Proposition 66, a ballot measure passed by California voters in 2016, allows prison officials to transfer condemned inmate to any state prison which provides the necessary level of security.

The State of California took full control of capital punishment in 1891. Originally, executions took place at San Quentin and at Folsom State Prison. Folsom's last execution occurred on December 3, 1937. In previous eras the California Institution for Women housed the death row for women.

On March 13, 2019, California Governor Gavin Newsom signed an executive order instituting a moratorium on the death penalty in California in the form of a reprieve for all people sentenced to death. The executive order also calls for repealing California's lethal injection protocol and the immediate closing of the execution chamber at San Quentin State Prison. The order does not provide for the release of any individual from prison or otherwise alter any current conviction or sentence.

=== Parole ===
According to the Department's official Web site, "there are more than 148,000 adult parolees and 3,800 juvenile parolees supervised by the CDCR." A 2002 article found that "California's growth in the numbers of people on parole supervision—and in the numbers whose parole has been revoked—has far exceeded the growth in the rest of the nation." California accounted for 12 percent of the U.S. population but 18% of the U.S. parole population, and almost 90,000 California parolees returned to prison in 2000.

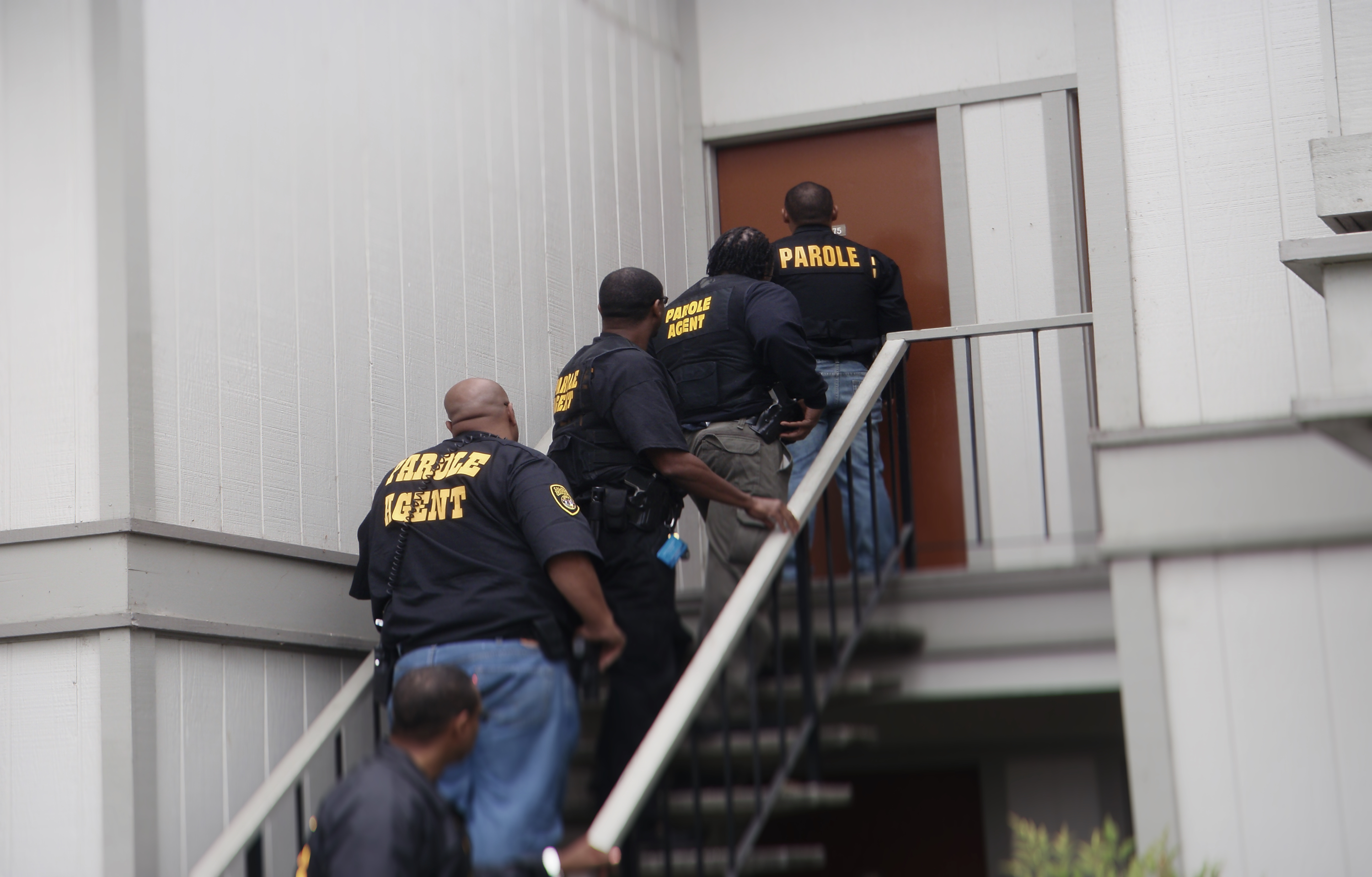
Parole Agents making a home visit in Oakland, California

At San Quentin, the non-profit organization California Reentry Program "helps inmates re-enter society after they serve their sentences."

== CDCR Peace Officers ==
Correctional Officers and Parole Agents are sworn Peace Officers per California Penal code sections 830.5, as their primary duties are to provide public safety and correctional services in and outside of state prison grounds, state-operated medical facilities, and camps while engaged in the performance of their duties.

The primary duties of these officers include, but are not limited to, providing public safety and law enforcement services in and around California's adult and youth institutions, fire camps, and state-operated medical facilities and hospitals, and community correctional facilities. These officers also monitor and supervise parolees who are released back into the general public. Other primary duties include investigation and apprehension of institutional escapees and parolees at large (PAL), prison gangs, statewide narcotics enforcement and investigations (involving institutions), etc.

Agents of the Office of Correctional Safety (OCS) are peace officers per California Penal Code 830.2 whether assigned to the Special Service Unit (Special Agents), the Fugitive Apprehension Team (Special Agents, PAI, II & IIIs), or other entity of OCS, which serves are the special operations division of the department. OCS Agents are classified as full time peace officers.

=== Correctional Peace Officer Academy ===
CDCR Peace Officers are trained to become Sworn Peace Officers of the State of California at the Basic Correctional Peace Officer Academy located in Galt, California. Cadets must complete a 13-week formal and comprehensive training program. The curriculum consists of 640 hours (four months) of training. Instruction includes but is not limited to firearms, chemical agents, non-lethal impact weapons, arrest and control techniques, state law, penal codes and department policies and procedures.

Cadets must also successfully complete the Peace Officer Standards and Training (POST) minimum requirement course. Upon completion of the academy, cadets are sworn in as CDCR peace officers. Upon assignment to their work institution or location, these officers also undergo further training for two years as vocational apprentices (one year of which is spent on probation). Upon completion of their two-year training they are then considered regular state correctional peace officers (CDCR officers)

== Rank structure ==
Title	Insignia
Department Director	
Warden	
Chief Deputy Warden	
Associate Warden	
Captain	
Lieutenant	
Sergeant	
Correctional Officer	

== Specialized Units ==
=== Fugitive Apprehension Team ===
The Fugitive Apprehension Team (FAT), is an elite and low-profile unit within CDCR. Comprising just over eighty agents, these criminal investigators are assigned to offices throughout the state. They are teamed with the Warrants Unit of the United States Marshals Service (USMS) and are tasked with locating and apprehending individuals wanted for high-violence offenses, whether under the jurisdiction of CDCR or local agencies. FAT agents have full-time peace officer powers throughout the state under Penal Code Section 830.2(d) and provide services to local agencies whose resources do not allow them to pursue violent offenders who have fled their jurisdictions, to parole violators wanted for violent offenses, and individuals wanted under federal warrants. Some of the agents have powers that extend beyond the State of California as they are also sworn Special Deputies of the USMS. FAT agents are highly trained in high-risk warrant service execution and must complete a special tactical academy to become a member of the "Teams." The "Teams" take their nick name from the Navy SEAL program. Members of these teams are kept confidential for safety and security reasons, as their nature is to conduct investigations in locating violent fugitives and executing their apprehension on a timely basis, ensuring the safety and security of all involved.

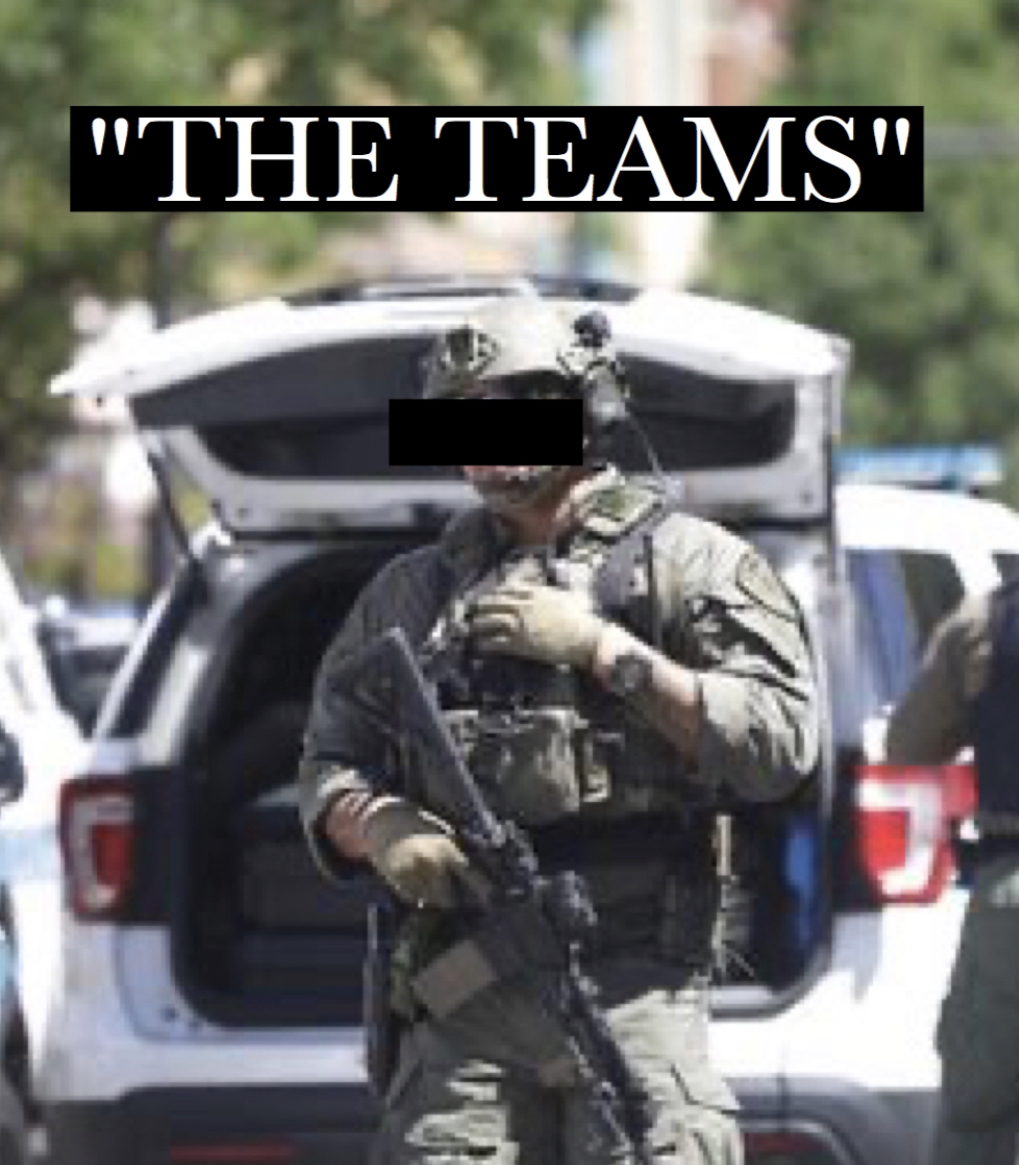
A member of the TEAMS

FAT shares a sentimental affiliation with the historic California Rangers, who were created in May 1853 by a California Legislative Act and organized by Captain Harry Love, to apprehend dangerous offenders of the time. In August 1853, after having fulfilled their purpose, the Rangers were mustered out of service California Ranger. The affiliation that FAT shares, although remotely, is that in July 1996 the California State Legislature enacted specific funds earmarked via the Department of Corrections to create fugitive teams to locate and bring to justice parole violators, the most violent offenders of modern times. In 2005, the department created a new division, the Office of Correctional Safety, incorporating the Law Enforcement and Investigations Unit to oversee fugitive and gang investigations. FAT's mission expanded at that time and an affiliation was created with the USMS in the investigation and apprehension of the most violent offenders throughout the state.

=== Special Service Unit ===
In addition to correctional officers, CDCR employs a small group of criminal investigators who are assigned to offices throughout the state. These investigators are part of an elite unit known as the Special Service Unit or simply SSU.

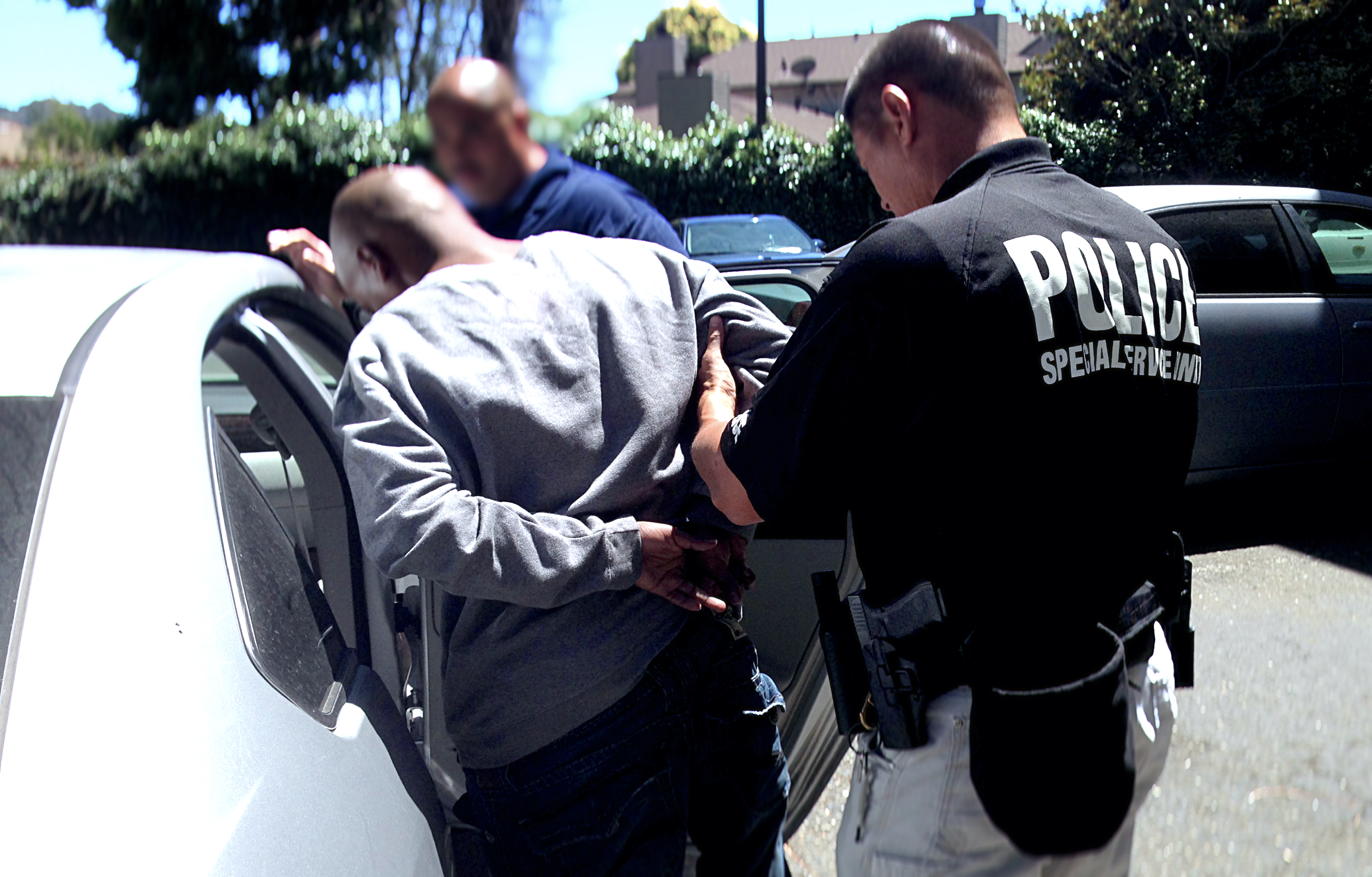
CDCR Special Service Unit agents making an arrest

== Issues ==
=== California Correctional Health Care Services (CCHCS) ===
There are at multiple ongoing lawsuits over medical care in the California prison system. Plata v. Brown is a federal class action civil rights lawsuit alleging unconstitutionally inadequate medical services, and as a result of a stipulation between the plaintiffs and the state, the court issued an injunction requiring defendants to provide "only the minimum level of medical care required under the Eighth Amendment." However, three years after approving the stipulation as an order of the court, the court conducted an evidentiary hearing that revealed the continued existence of appalling conditions arising from defendants’ failure to provide adequate medical care to California inmates. As a result, the court ruled in June 2005 and issued an order on October 3, 2005, putting the CDCR's medical health care delivery system in receivership, citing the "depravity" of the system. In February 2006, the judge appointed Robert Sillen to the position and Sillen was replaced by J. Clark Kelso in January 2008.

Coleman v. Brown is a federal class action civil rights lawsuit alleging unconstitutionally inadequate mental health care, filed on April 23, 1990. On September 13, 1995, the court found the delivery of mental health care violated the Eighth Amendment to the United States Constitution, and issued an order for injunctive relief requiring defendants to develop plans to remedy the constitutional violations under the supervision of a special master.

Following the Governor's issuance of the State of Emergency Proclamation, the plaintiffs in Plata and Coleman filed motions to convene a three-judge court to limit the prison population. On July 23, 2007, both the Plata and Coleman courts granted the plaintiff's motions and recommended that the cases be assigned to the same three-judge court. The Chief Judge of the United States Court of Appeals for the Ninth Circuit agreed and, on July 26, 2007, convened the instant three-judge district court pursuant to 28 U.S.C. § 2284.

As of 2008–09 fiscal year, the state of California spent approximately $16,000 per inmate per year on prison health care. This amount was by far the largest in the country and more than triple the $4,400 spent per inmate in 2001. The state with the second largest prison population in the country, Texas, spent less than $4,000 per inmate per year.

Another trend that has emerged involves California prisoners initiating lawsuits against individual doctors, alleging substandard medical care received while incarcerated.

== Program Shutdowns ==
=== Division of Juvenile Justice (DJJ) ===
The California Department of Corrections and Rehabilitation (CDCR) first considered incarceration of youth in 1850. In serious cases, approximately 300 boys under the age of 20 were sent to the state prisons in San Quentin and Folsom between 1850 and 1860. It wasn't until 1941 that California State Legislature adopted the Youth Corrections Authority Act (CYA).

The CYA wasn't given departmental status until 1953. In 2005, a reorganization of California correctional agencies was made and the CYA became the Division of Juvenile Justice (DJJ) within the Department of Corrections and Rehabilitation. A decade later, DJJ revised operations to enhance the delivery of services to youth:

- Trauma-focused Cognitive Behavior Therapy for mental health youth
- Cognitive Behavioral Interventions for Substance Abuse for youth in need of substance abuse treatment
- A revised reinforcement system

By 2019, Governor Gavin Newsom reforms the 2020-2021 California State Budget, allowing DJJ to transition out of CDCR and into the California Heath and Human Services Agency. However, in 2020 Governor Newsom signs an Executive Order to delay the transfer to CA-HHSA for one year, citing COVID-19. Later that year, Senate Bill 823 passes outlining the closure of DJJ through normal discharge processes of existing youth and the transfer of remaining youth to their counties of origin, known as Realignment. SB 823 sets July 1, 2021 as the date for which youth will no longer be accepted to DJJ, with some exceptions.

But in 2021, Senate Bill 92 passes in the California Legislature setting DJJ facilities to close by June 30, 2023.

On June 30, 2023, all juvenile operations ceased at N.A. Chaderjian Youth Correctional Facility in Stockton and Ventura Youth Correctional Facility in Camarillo as all DJJ youth were realigned to the care of counties per SB 823.

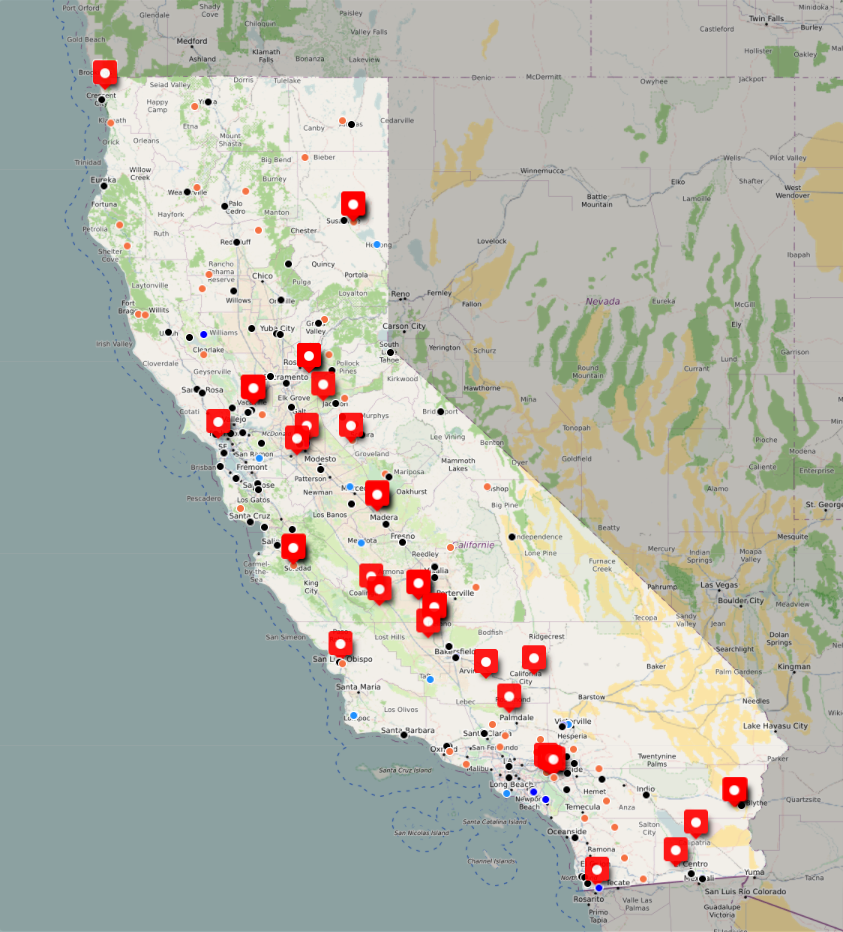
Prison Locations

== Union: California Correctional Peace Officers Association ==
Officers of the department are represented by the California Correctional Peace Officers Association (the CCPOA). It was founded in 1957 and its stated goals include the protection and safety of officers, and the advocation of laws, funding and policies to improve work operations and protect public safety. The union has had its controversies over the years, including criticism of its large contributions to former California Governor Gray Davis. Since the California recall election, 2003, the CCPOA has been a vocal critic of Governor Arnold Schwarzenegger.

In June 2008, the union came under investigation from both the California Office of the Inspector General and the CDCR for its role in the hiring of a 21-year-old parolee by Minorities In Law Enforcement, an affiliate of CCPOA. Upon conclusion of investigations by both agencies, no wrongdoing was found.

== See also ==
- List of law enforcement agencies in California

National:

- List of United States state correction agencies
- Prison–industrial complex
- Incarceration in the United States
- Critical Resistance
