= Billy Mansfield =

American serial killer and sex offender

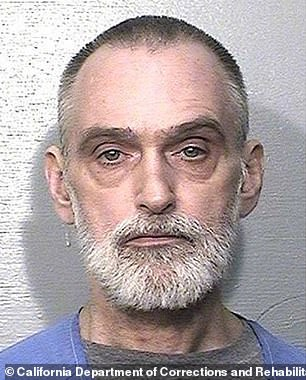
- Mugshot
- Born: William Mansfield, Jr. November 23, 1955 (age 70); Grand Rapids, Michigan, U.S.
- Convictions: First degree murder (x5); Sexual battery
- Penalty: Life imprisonment (x4) (Florida); 25 years to life (California)

Details
- Victims: 6+
- Span of crimes: 1975–1980
- Country: United States
- States: Florida, California
- Date apprehended: For the final time on October 26, 1981
- Imprisoned at: California Health Care Facility, Stockton, California

William "Billy" Mansfield Jr. (born November 23, 1955) is an American serial killer, child molester and sex offender, responsible for the murders of six women and girls between 1975 and 1980. He buried the bodies of four victims at the family home in Spring Hill, Florida, and later traveled with his brother to California, where he raped and strangled a Watsonville woman. He was convicted of the last homicide, and later pleaded guilty to the previous murders to avoid a death sentence in Florida, receiving four life sentences. In January 2024 he confessed to another teenage girl's murder in Florida.

== Early life ==
William Mansfield Jr. was born on November 23, 1955, in Grand Rapids, Michigan, the eldest in a family of five children. His father, William Sr., was a convicted child molester who had served sentences in both Michigan and Nevada, who often encouraged fights between his sons. Despite this, the younger Mansfield claimed that he had a good upbringing and got along with his family, but that changed when he was 14, when he dropped out of school and altered his birth certificate so he could serve in the Army. While serving, he became an alcoholic; not long after this, he also began experimenting with various drugs. As a result of his addiction he was sent for treatment at a Veterans Administration Hospital in Tampa in 1978 and 1980. In 1975, he married Phyllis Spielmaker and had two children with her, but they divorced in 1979, his ex-wife deciding to stay in Grand Rapids with the kids. According to Spielmaker, Billy, a closeted bisexual, often brought men from gay bars home and had sex with them in front of her, and one time discussed a murder with her. She described him as easygoing, but very violent when drunk.

== Murders ==
=== Elaine Zeigler ===
On New Year's Eve in 1975, a 15-year-old girl from Parkman, Ohio, named Elaine Louise Zeigler went missing from a KOA campground near Brooksville. She was on vacation with her mother Betty and step-father Blaine Chalker, and was last seen going to the camp showers. By the next day Elaine still had not returned, and her parents reported her missing. Search parties organized by the local police department and volunteers were spread out to search the area in order to find Zeigler, who, at that time, was thought to be a runaway. Several people claimed that they had seen a girl matching her description riding a motorbike, and when asked where she was going, the girl claimed to be returning to her home state of Ohio. On the other hand, there were also reported sightings of Elaine talking to a man in his twenties near the shower area, and later entering his car, a light blue 1966 Ford Fairlane with Florida license plates.

After staying an additional week to aid in the search for their daughter, realizing that nothing could be done, the Chalkers returned to their home in Parkman without Elaine.

=== Sex crimes ===
On January 31, 1977, Billy pleaded guilty to a sexual misconduct charge against a babysitter in Grand Rapids, receiving six months' imprisonment and 36 months' probation. Not long after leaving jail he assaulted two teenagers in a rural area of the city, and was sent back to prison for violating the conditions of his parole. There he shared a cell with 27-year-old Albert Lee III, who confided to Mansfield that he had murdered an 11-year-old girl named Linda VanderVeen. Using this information, Billy testified against Lee in exchange for a lesser sentence, and was released from jail after a year.

On June 19, 1980, he forced 18-year-old Pamela Sherrell into his van and drove to a rented trailer, where he proceeded to hit her, cutting her lip and bruising her neck. Sherrell reported the incident to the police, but when they went to arrest him, he was not there. On November 23, he was arrested in Santa Cruz, but posted bail and was set free again.

=== René Saling ===
On December 7, 1980, the half-naked body of 29-year-old René Saling was found at a drainage ditch at the side of the Buena Vista Road in Watsonville, California by passing motorists. A mother of three, René had been last seen by her husband Raymond the previous day. Her clothes had been torn apart, with her blouse and pants lowered to her ankles. The coroner ruled the cause of death as strangulation. Four days later, Billy and his 23-year-old brother, Gary, were arrested by a rookie police officer at Winnemucca, Nevada, for questioning in Saling's murder. The two men lied about their identities and ages, but the officer noticed that their physical description matched the Mansfield brothers, and took them into custody at the Humboldt County jail. On December 16, the two brothers were arraigned at a Watsonville court on murder charges concerning Saling's death. They were dubbed "The Bag Brothers" by the media, due to the fact that they wore paper bags over their heads to protect the testimonies of any potential witnesses. The Mansfields pleaded not guilty to the murder charges, and were ordered to stand trial for Saling's murder by Justice John Marlo on February 4, 1981.

=== Carol Ann Barrett ===
On March 23, 1980, at 2am, 18 year old Carol Ann Barrett was kidnapped at gunpoint from the Treasure Island Motel in Daytona Beach Shores. Carol Ann Barrett of Zanesville, Ohio was with seven friends visiting Daytona Beach Shores for Spring Break when a lone gunman burst in and ordered them at gunpoint to disrobe, robbed them and threatened to kill them if they resisted. The gunman then grabbed one of Barrett's friends, saying that would ensure no one called the police on him, but Barrett volunteered to go instead of her friend to appease the gunman.

The next day her body was found ditch line along I-95 near Pecan Park Road in Jacksonville, Florida about 90 miles away. Barrett had been fatally shot, “execution” style, and there was no indication she had put up a struggle.

January 25, 2024, the Jacksonville Sheriff's Office announced that: "In 2020, a person of interest that had been formulated, Billy Mansfield Jr. (White Male, 65), was ultimately identified as the suspect in Carol Barrett's murder. Mansfield would have been 24 at the time of Carol's Murder. In September 2022, after multiple interviews spanning two years, Billy Mansfield advised that he was in fact the suspect in the police sketch completed following the abduction. He went on to confess to the abduction from the Daytona Beach Shores hotel, as well as to her murder shortly thereafter."

They stated that they would not seek prosecution in this case due to the multiple life sentences that Mansfield was already serving.

== Discovery of bodies ==
In mid-March 1981, the Hernando County Sheriff's Office obtained a search warrant to excavate the Mansfield family property in Spring Hill, based on information provided by an informant who claimed that there was a body underneath the property. The authorities searched and dug through the area until they located a skull and bones in a shallow grave covered with a blanket. Unsure if the bones were Zeigler's, they were sent for examination, where pathologist Dr. William Whitman concluded that they belonged to a female under 20 years of age. Despite the search warrant naming only Zeigler, authorities, suspecting that there could possibly be more bodies, continued with the excavations. Additional officers from Tampa and metal-detecting experts also aided in the excavations.

The located body was tentatively identified as that of the missing Zeigler, based on the skeleton's characteristics, skull and missing tooth. Jewelry was also located, but the Chalkers didn't recognize it as belonging to Elaine. Over the following weeks, there were continuous excavations with varying success, with the investigators initially uncovering bones from chickens and cows. On March 24, a small sack of human bones was found underneath the fireplace. Encouraged by this discovery, investigators continued digging and plowing the water pipes and electrical wiring installed over the bodies. Eventually, three more skeletons were unearthed, all belonging to young women. They were determined to be the following:

- Jane Doe – she was initially thought to be less than 13 years old.
- Theresa Fillingim – Described as a white female, aged 22–30, found on March 17. It was speculated that she might have been 21-year-old Melinda Harder, who had gone missing from St. Petersburg on July 27, 1980, but this was ruled out when Harder's remains were identified in 2008. She was finally identified using genetic genealogy in July 2022. The 16-year-old had been reported missing on May 16, 1980.
- Sandra Jean Graham (21) – A Tampa native and employee of the Hillsborough Community College, Graham was last seen at the parking lot of Pam's Liquor Lounge on April 27, 1980, accompanied by a man described as a "biker". She had left her cigarettes, car keys and eyeglasses at the bar. Her decomposed body was identified through a forensic dentist.

The skulls of the two Jane Does were later sent for reconstruction at the Colorado State University, with the task headed by retired anthropology professor Dr. Michael Charney. No positive matches were made, Theresa Fillingim was not identified until July, 2022, and the remaining Jane Doe remains unidentified. Mansfield admitted to killing 18-year-old Carol Ann Barrett, though due to a serving a life sentence in California followed by four life sentences in Florida, the state declined to pursue charges. Mansfield was also briefly considered a suspect in the murders of 19-year-old Cynthia Clements and 19-year-old Elizabeth Margaret Graham, both of whom were killed in a similar manner and sexually assaulted. James Winkles would later be convicted of the Graham homicide, and remains a suspect in the Clements murder.

Following the arrest of his brother, Gary Mansfield, for drug charges on October 27, 2020, more remains have been located at the family home in Spring Hill, FL.

== Trials and imprisonment ==
Following the discoveries of the skeletons, it was decided that the trial be moved to San Rafael in order to avoid a publicity bias against Mansfield. At trial, his previous encounters with the law and alleged sightings on the night of Saling's death were recalled. Despite this, the jury were deadlocked, and a new trial was ordered. At the request of Assistant State Attorney Chip Harp, the trial was granted a six-month stay.

=== Prison escape and recapture ===
On October 27, 1981, aided by 22-year-old fellow inmate Ben Barrigan, (Note: Sources differ as to whether the name is "Barrigan" or "Parriga".) Billy unchained himself while at the recreation yard and climbed up a roof, where, together with Barrigan, he jumped to the ground and fled. However, they were spotted by a woman, who initially ignored them, thinking they were joggers in orange tracksuits, before eventually notifying police. Patrols and sniffer dogs were quickly dispatched, and the surrounding areas searched. At about 11:45 PM, a man reported two suspicious men running by his house, and the policemen investigated the area, finding two sets of footprints leading up the river. After 11 hours of searching, a tired and disheveled Mansfield was arrested without incident at Paradise Park, hiding in some bushes and still wearing his prison uniform. About half an hour after, Barrigan was arrested at Lighthouse Point after being spotted by a citizen. Both prisoners were successfully returned to jail.

=== Second trial ===
While in the Santa Cruz County jail, a Hernando County judge indicted Mansfield for the murder of one of the four victims found buried underneath his property. In addition, he was charged with attempted sexual battery in the Sherrell case. The new trial was scheduled for February 8, 1982, with Billy's brother Gary and a woman known as "Cindy" agreeing to testify against him. After a two-week long trial, Billy Mansfield was convicted of René Saling's murder, and sent back to prison to await his sentencing. He was later handed a 25-year-to-life sentence. Concerning the Florida homicides, after initially claiming to be innocent, Mansfield pleaded guilty to all four, and was given four life terms as part of a plea bargain. In a prepared statement, he said, "I am pleading guilty because I am guilty of the charges and I have no other reason."

Not long after his sentencing, several inmates at the Hernando County Prison, among them spree killer Robert Dale Henderson, attempted to break out, but were thwarted by the authorities. During the escape attempt, Mansfield was offered freedom, but declined.

== See also ==
- List of serial killers in the United States

== Bibliography ==
- Michael Newton (1992). Serial Slaughter: What's Behind America's Murder Epidemic?. Loompanics. ISBN 1559500786.
- W.R. Langston (May 19, 2007). When Angels Weep: The Weeki Wachee Homicides. Xlibris Corporation. ISBN 978-1462819270.
- Harold Schechter (November 27, 2012). The A to Z Encyclopedia of Serial Killers. Simon and Schuster. ISBN 978-1439138854.
- Darren Burch (October 31, 2017). Twisted But True. Page Publishing, Inc. ISBN 978-1635680829.
