= Minorities In Law Enforcement =

Minorities In Law Enforcement (MILE), founded in 1993, is a culturally and ethnically diverse group of law enforcement professionals committed to public safety, crime prevention and building bridges in communities between law enforcement and youth.

== M.I.L.E 4 Kids ==
Sponsored by MILE, MILE4KIDS is a non-profit foundation promoting educational, intervention and enrichment activities for youth – to lessen the allure of gangs, drugs and crime by providing positive role models and lifestyle alternatives.
