= Southeastern Community College (North Carolina) =

Public college in Whiteville, North Carolina, US

Coordinates: 34.3315488°N 78.7837466°W

Southeastern Community College is a public community college with its main campus between Chadbourn and Whiteville, North Carolina. It was founded in 1964 and is accredited by the Commission on Colleges of the Southern Association of Colleges and Schools to award certificates, diplomas, and associate degrees. The college is part of the North Carolina Community College System.

== History ==
Chartered on February 6, 1964, Southeastern Community College (SCC) is a public, comprehensive community college for area adults.

Over 100 occupational and liberal arts curriculum certificates, diplomas and degrees are offered by the college. More than 2,600 students enroll in SCC's college-credit courses annually.

SCC provides continuing education courses throughout Columbus County, serving more than 8,000 students annually.

The 246-acre campus is on the Chadbourn Highway between Whiteville and Chadbourn in southeastern North Carolina. SCC is a one-hour drive from historic cities of Wilmington and Fayetteville, North Carolina, as well as the beaches of both North and South Carolina.

The college's nickname is the Rams.

== Academics ==
SCC offers college-credit curriculum programs with some courses available at night or online. Some programs may be completed through evening and distance learning classes. The college offers the following academic programs:

- Associate in Arts
- Associate in Fine Arts
- Associate in Science
- Associate in Applied Science
- Associate in General Education
- Vocational Diplomas
- Certificates

=== Columbus Career and College Academy ===
Southeastern allows students to begin high school at its Fair Bluff campus. At the end of their 9th grade year, student can choose to focus on either a technical or college-based pathway.

== Small business center ==
The college operates a small business center in Brunswick, NC designed to work with businesses, civic leaders and other civic groups to assist small businesses in the four county area of Bladen County, Brunswick County, Columbus County, and Robeson County. A 36-hour continuing education program titled REAL—Rural Entrepreneurship through Action Learning is available to assist entrepreneurs.

A resource library and a Microenterprise Loan Program are also available. Seminars and workshops are also available.
