= Burton Blatt Institute =

Research institute at Syracuse University in New York, U.S.

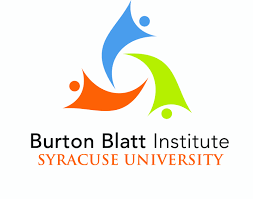
- Named after: Burton Blatt
- Established: 2005; 21 years ago
- Type: Disability Rights, Public policy
- Location(s): 950 Irving Avenue Dineen Hall, Suite 446 Syracuse University Syracuse, New York 13244-2130
- Coordinates: 43.036277°N 76.138720°W
- Chairman: Peter Blanck
- Parent organization: Syracuse University
- Expenses: $8.9 million (2011)
- Staff: 30 (2020)
- Website: bbi.syr.edu

The Burton Blatt Institute (BBI), established at Syracuse University in 2005, is an organization that aims to advance civic, economic, and social participation of persons with disabilities in a global society. Peter Blanck, a university professor at Syracuse University, is the chairman of BBI.

BBI is headquartered in Syracuse University's College of Law building to synergize research interests in civil rights laws. Outside of Syracuse, BBI also has offices in Washington, D.C., Atlanta, New York City, Lexington, and Los Angeles.

== History ==
Wordmark for the Burton Blatt Institute.

BBI takes its name from Burton Blatt (1927–85), a pioneer in humanizing services for people with mental retardation, a staunch advocate of deinstitutionalization, and a national leader in special education.

In 2004, incoming Syracuse university chancellor Nancy Cantor, during her inauguration speech, announced her intentions to create an institute serving people with disabilities. Peter Blanck and others were recruited from Law, Health Policy and Disability Center (LHPDC) to establish a cross-disciplinary research, education, and outreach institute for advancing the quality of life of persons across the spectrum of disabilities, resulting in formation of BBI in 2005. In addition to BBI, SU houses the Center for Disability and Inclusion, the Taishoff Center for Inclusive Higher Education, Center on Human Policy, Disability Studies program and Inclusive U in the School of Education.

=== Burton Blatt ===
Burton Blatt was born in New York City on May 23, 1927. He graduated from New York University in 1949, and received a master's degree in education from Columbia University. He also received a doctorate from Penn State. He began his teaching career teaching children with disabilities and eventually became an associate professor and Coordinator of Special Education at New Haven State Teachers College. In 1961, Blatt became the chair of the Special Education Department at Boston University. Then in 1969 he went to Syracuse University as a professor of education and Director of the Division of Special Education and Rehabilitation.

Blatt helped found the Center of Human Policy, which was an organization involved in insuring rights of individuals with disabilities. In 1976, Blatt became the dean of the Syracuse University School of Education. Outside of teaching, Blatt also consulted with federal agencies and various state departments that deal in different ways with individuals with disabilities. He also was a prominent speaker who gave lectures at universities and other institutions. He has written over 100 books and articles, notably Christmas in Purgatory, a portrait of life in a mental institution, as well as the follow-up The Family Papers: A Return to Purgatory. Blatt died in 1985 at the age of 57.

== Publications ==
Burton Blatt Institute faculty and staff also engage in significant scholarship. BBI's publications are largely available to the public, including those printed in peer-reviewed scholarly journals and in other venues. The BBI Publications page links the most recent articles as well as historical archives. BBI also produces several listservs which are available at no cost to the public, and which update subscribers on disability-related topics.

== Research and projects ==
In 2020, The Burton Blatt Institute employed of about 30 staff (and 20 students) who worked on more than 25 projects nationally and internationally. These projects include the Southeast ADA Center in Atlanta, disability law, and research on "supported decision-making", and rehabilitation research. The Burton Blatt Institute also hosts and sponsors the Disability Rights Bar Association (DRBA). The DRBA is a network of legal practitioners specializing in disability civil rights law. The DRBA operates a listserv for members as well as a document bank where members can access a number of resources. The DRBA also files amicus briefs cases to promote the rights of people with disabilities. In 2020, the BBI helped establish the Disability Inclusive Employment Policy Rehabilitation Research and Training Center along with Harvard and Rutgers.

- Southeast ADA center: Established in 1991, The Southeast ADA center has been operated by BBI since 2006. One of ten ADA centers, The southeast ADA center serves an eight-state region (Alabama, Florida, Georgia, Kentucky, Mississippi, North Carolina, South Carolina, and Tennessee) and is designed to provide information related to the Americans with Disabilities Act to individuals in business, government, and education.
- Jenny Hatch Justice Project: BBI currently sponsors the Jenny Hatch Justice Project and has helped organize the National Resource Center for Supported Decision Making. Both of these projects provide information and other resources to support individuals with disabilities in making their own decisions.
- TACE: The Southeast Technical Assistance & Continuing Education Center (TACE) is an organization aimed at helping individuals with disabilities transition from education to employment and achieve positive employment outcomes for individuals with significant disabilities.
